= Lopikerwaard =

Coat of arms of the Lopikerwaard water board

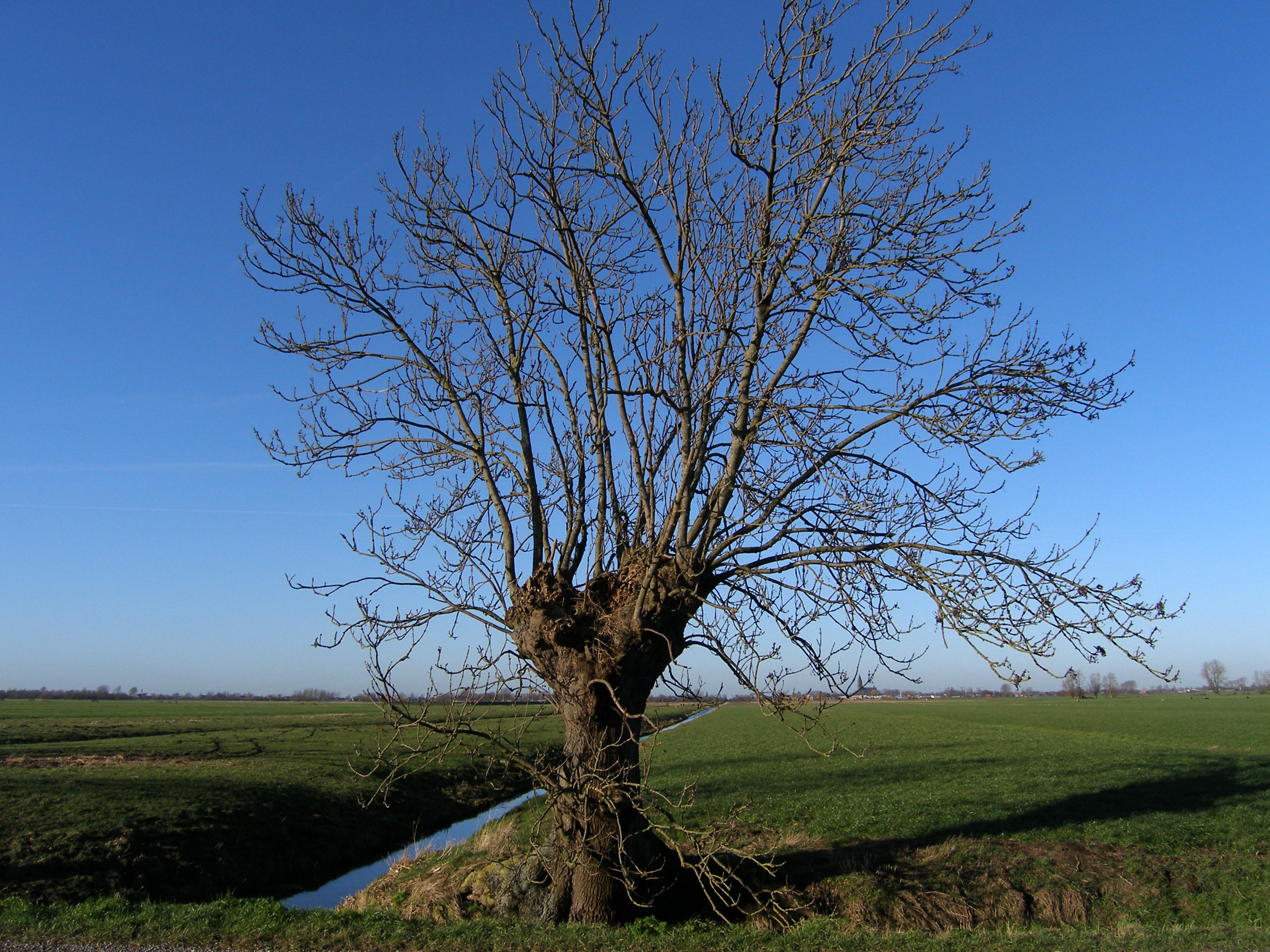
The Willige Langerak polder, part of the Lopikerwaard.

The Lopikerwaard is a polder landscape, located in the Dutch province of Utrecht.

== History ==
Originally an area of swampland, the polder was developed from the eleventh century CE. Many canals were dug in order to drain the land, dividing the land into equally sized plots which still define the landscape.

== Geography ==
The polder area is bounded by the Hollandse IJssel river to the north and north east, the Lek river to the south and the Krimpenerwaard polder to the west. Several larger drainage canals cross the polder from east to west. The area largely coincides with the municipality of Lopik, whence it gets its name. The landscape is defined by large areas of pasture lands and linear settlements.

=== Towns of the Lopikerwaard ===
- Lopik
- Benschop
- Polsbroek
- Polsbroekerdam
- Zevender
- Willige Langerak
- Cabauw
- Jaarsveld
- Lopikerkapel
- Graaf (Lopik)
- Uitweg
- Hoenkoop
- Willeskop

The cities of Oudewater, Montfoort and IJsselstein are located at the edges of the area.

== Geology ==
The Lopikerwaard soil consists mainly of a thick layer of peat the thins out towards the east. At the edges, near the rivers, clay deposits can be found.
