= Lopik =

- Municipality
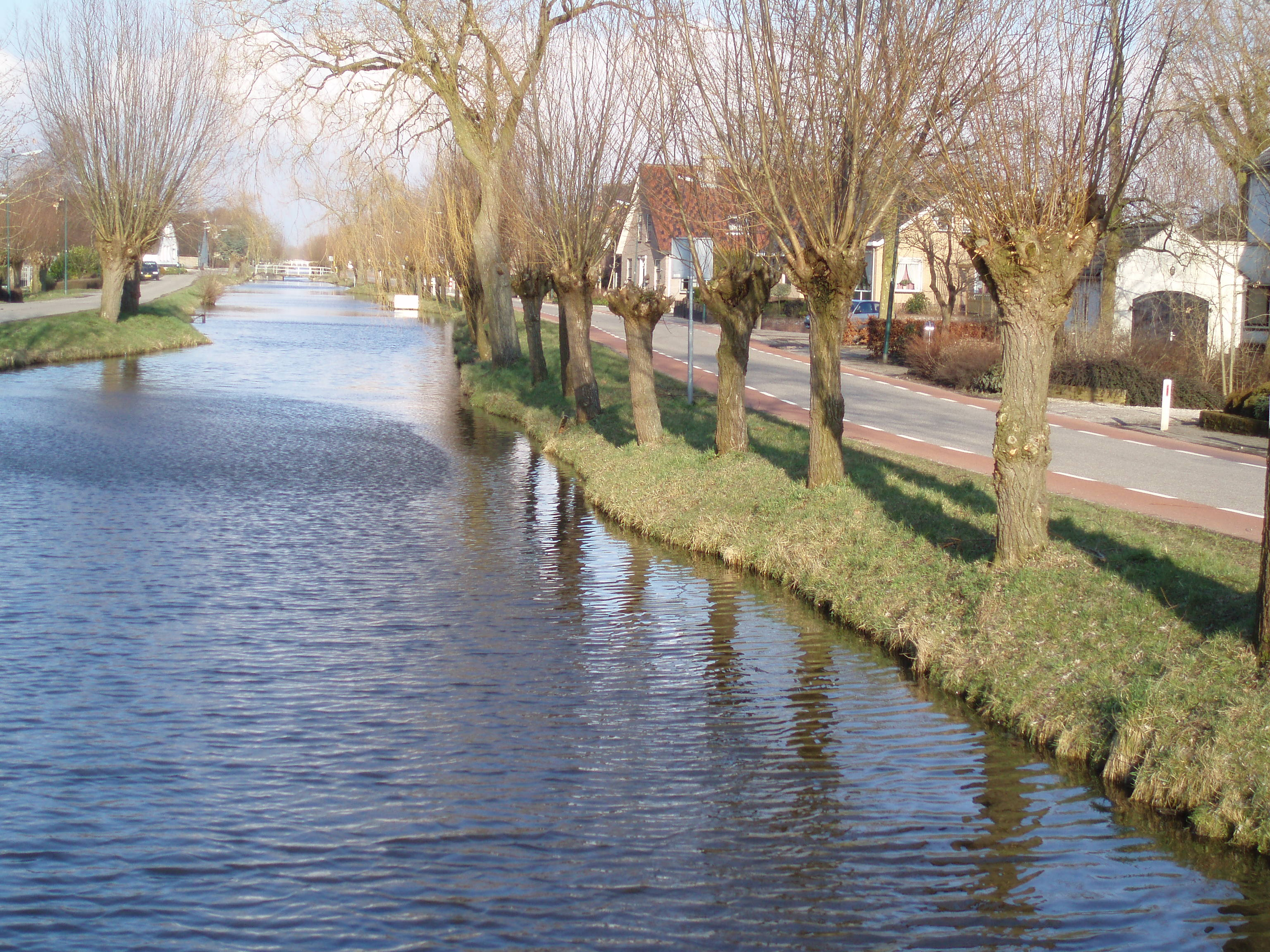
- Canal through Polsbroek

- Flag Coat of arms

- Location in Utrecht
- Coordinates: 51°58′N 4°57′E
- Country: Netherlands
- Province: Utrecht

Government
  - Body: Municipal council
  - Mayor: Laurens de Graaf (CDA)

Area
  - Total: 78.98 km^{2} (30.49 sq mi)
  - Land: 75.57 km^{2} (29.18 sq mi)
  - Water: 3.41 km^{2} (1.32 sq mi)
- Elevation: 0 m (0 ft)

Population (January 2021)
  - Total: 14,456
  - Density: 191/km^{2} (490/sq mi)
- Time zone: UTC+1 (CET)
  - Summer (DST): UTC+2 (CEST)
- Postcode: 3405–3415
- Area code: 0182, 030, 0348
- Website: www.lopik.nl

Lopik (Dutch pronunciation: [ˈloːpɪk]) is a municipality and a town in the Netherlands, in the province of Utrecht, close to the Lek river.

== History ==
Lopik lies within the Lopikerwaard region, which used to be occupied by swamps and forests until the area was cultivated in the eleventh century. Lopik was first mentioned as "Lobeke" in 1155 CE. Most of the population settled along the canals that were used for transport and drainage (and which are still used for the latter purpose). It was not until after World War II that villages in the area were expanded beyond the original ribbons of buildings, and Lopik remains a well-known example of a linear settlement within the Netherlands.

In the Netherlands, "Lopik" is often used as a reference to the broadcasting facilities located in the eastern part of the municipality and in neighbouring IJsselstein. These include the Gerbrandy Tower, a structure that is the tallest structure in the Netherlands, and the world's largest Christmas tree during the period around Christmas.

== Geography ==
The entire municipality lies within the Dutch Green Heart and has a rural character. The two main access roads are the N210 and N204 provincial roads, which connect the area with major cities that include Rotterdam and Utrecht. The river Lek lies behind a high dike, which is visible from most of the south of the Lopik municipality. In the end of the eighties and early nineties the dike was strengthened and extra height was added in preparation for increasingly high water levels. Ambitious planning for continued improvement to the dikes continues.

=== Population centres ===
The municipality of Lopik consists of the following towns, villages and/or districts:

- Benschop
- Cabauw
- Jaarsveld
- Lopik
- Lopikerkapel
- Polsbroek
- Polsbroekerdam
- Uitweg
- Willige Langerak
- Zevender

=== Topography ===
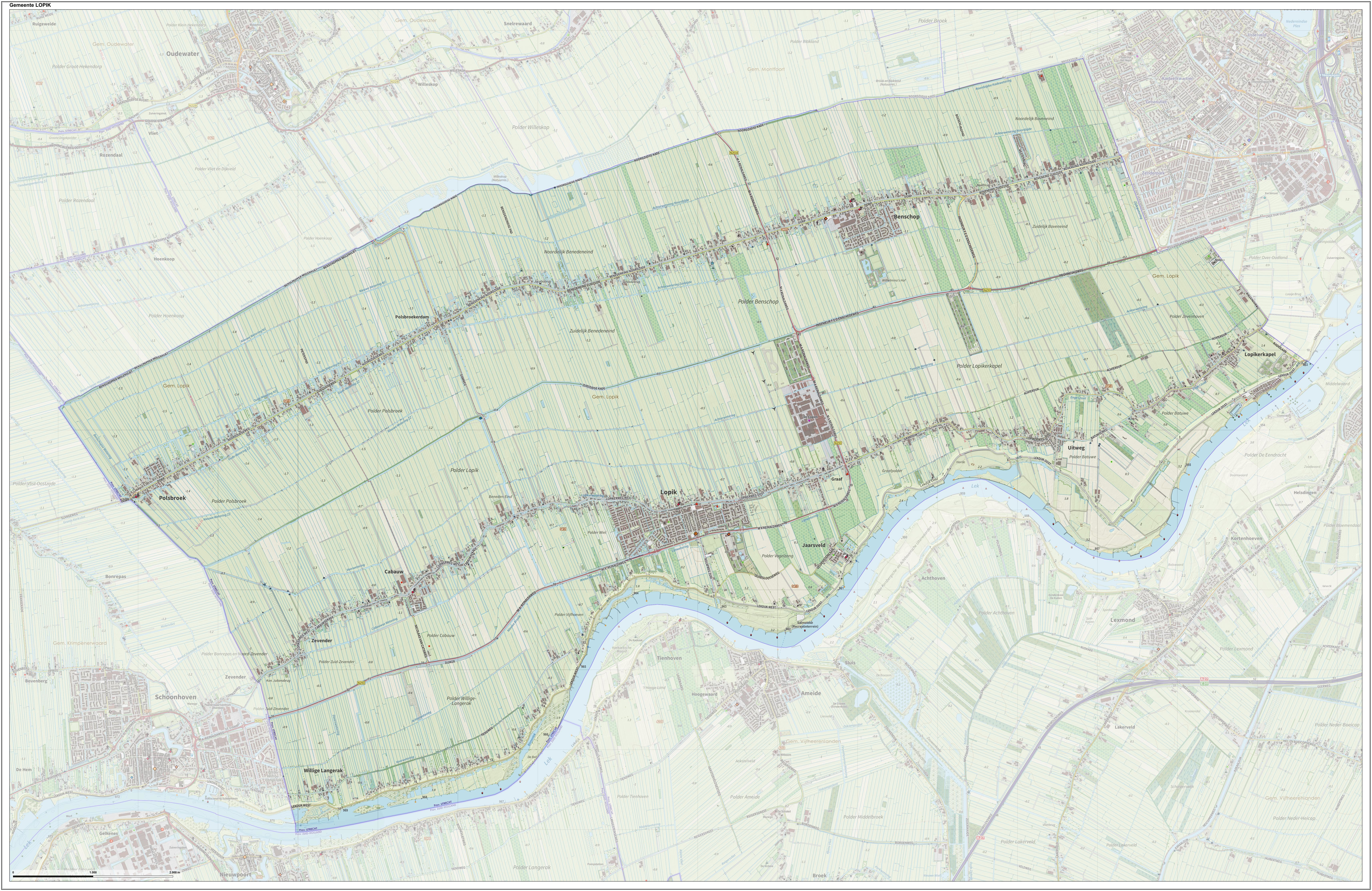

Dutch topographic map of the municipality of Lopik, June 2015

== Transport ==
Public transport in the region primarily consists of bus connections, which are mainly carried out by Syntus. The nearest railway stations are in Gouda and Woerden.

== Notable residents ==
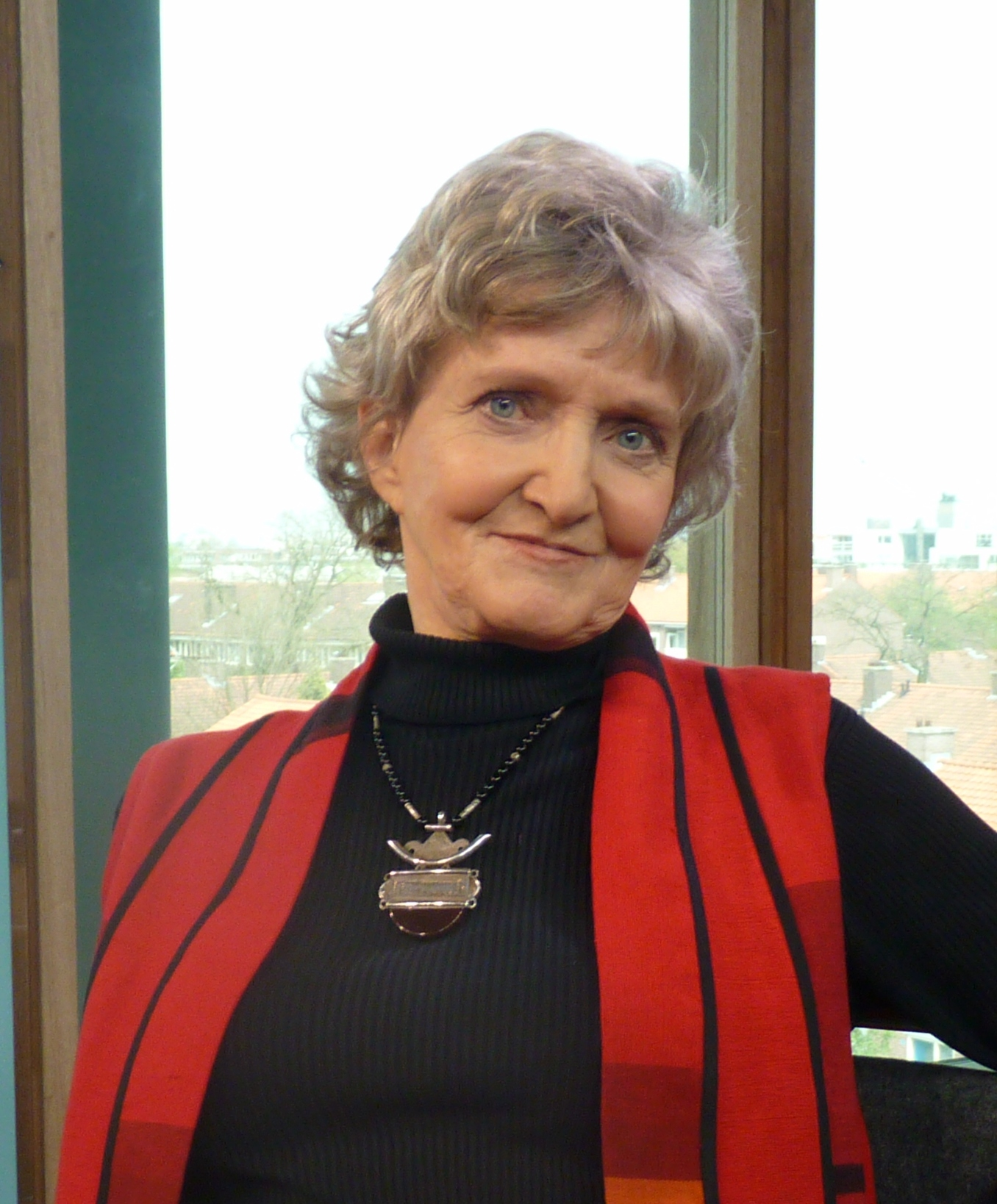
Mineke Schipper, 2012

- Paul Theodor van Brussel (1754 in Zuid-Polsbroek – 1795) a Dutch flower painter
- Herman de Man (1898–1946) a Dutch novelist, grew up in Lopikerwaard
- Mineke Schipper (born 1938 in Polsbroek) a Dutch author of non-fiction and fiction and scholar
- Kees van Ieperen (born 1956 in Lopikerkapel) a retired skeet shooter, competed at the 1980 Summer Olympics
- Ton Strien (born 1958 in Lopik) a Dutch politician
- Tjaarke Maas (1974 in Lopik – 2004) a Dutch painter, partic. of Russian sacred art
- Peter Schep (born 1977 in Lopik) a Dutch racing track endurance cyclist
- Kees van Buuren (born 1986 in Lopik) a retired Dutch footballer with 230 club caps

== Gallery ==
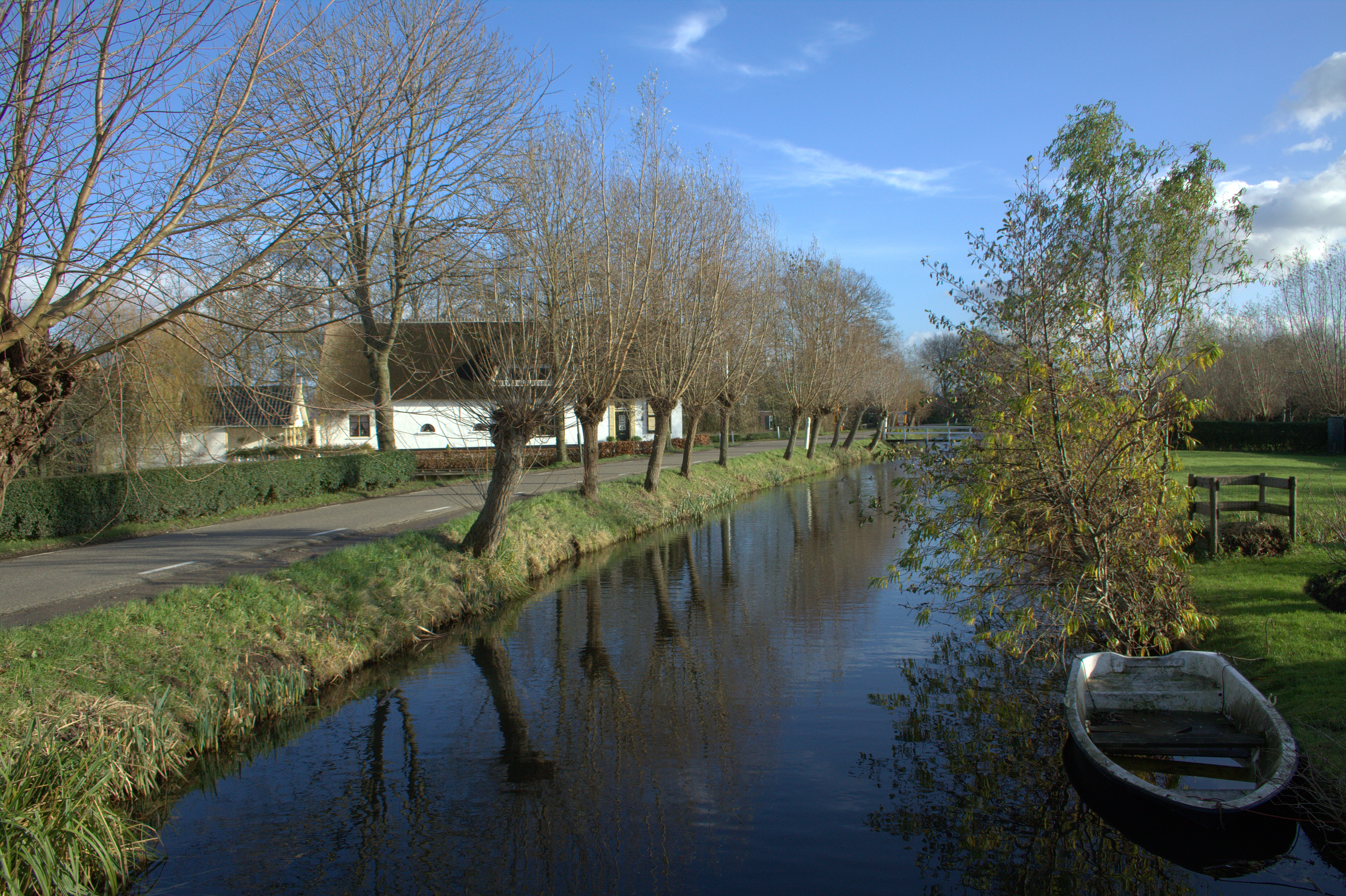
Lopik in November

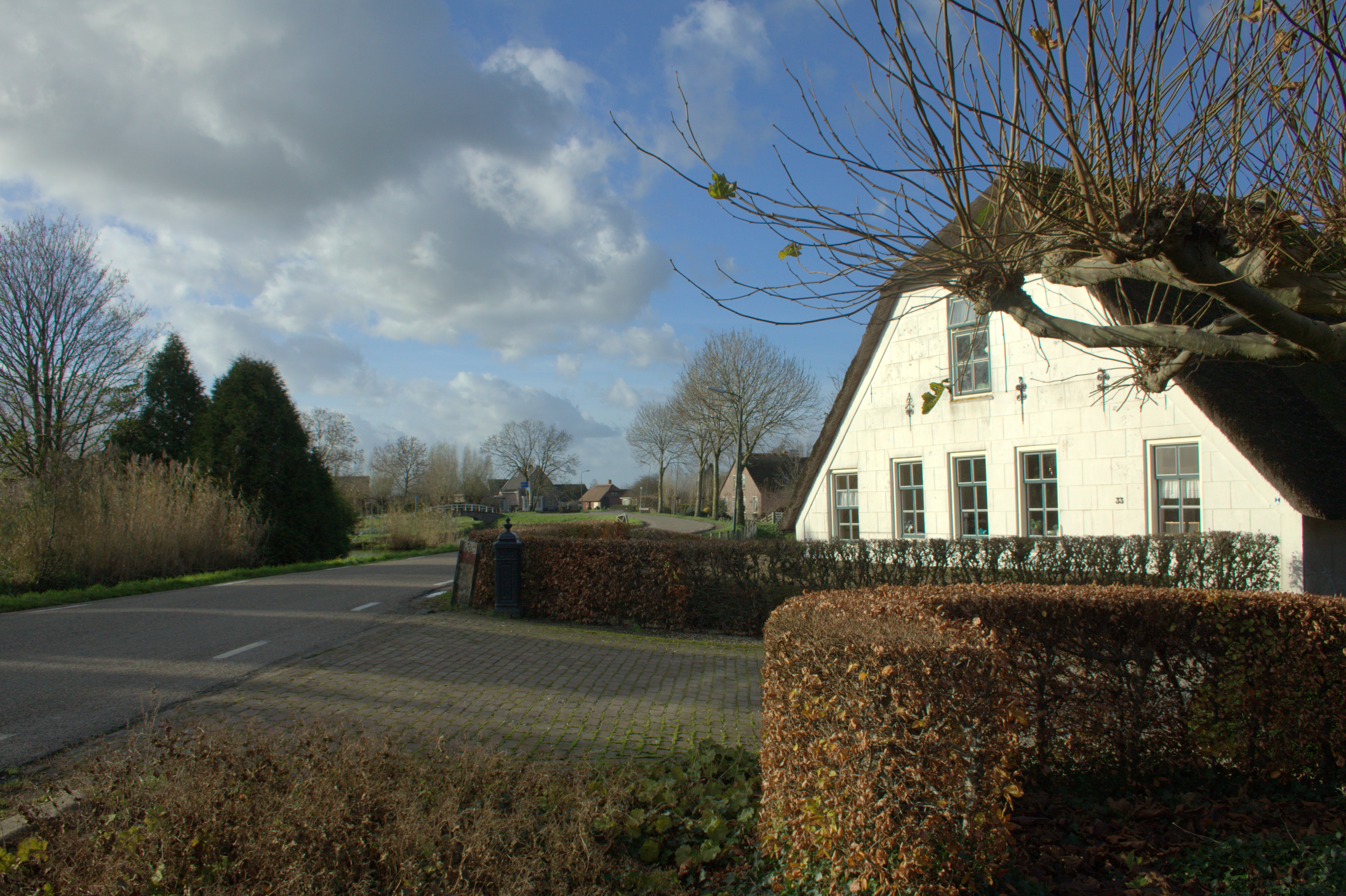
Lopikerwaard

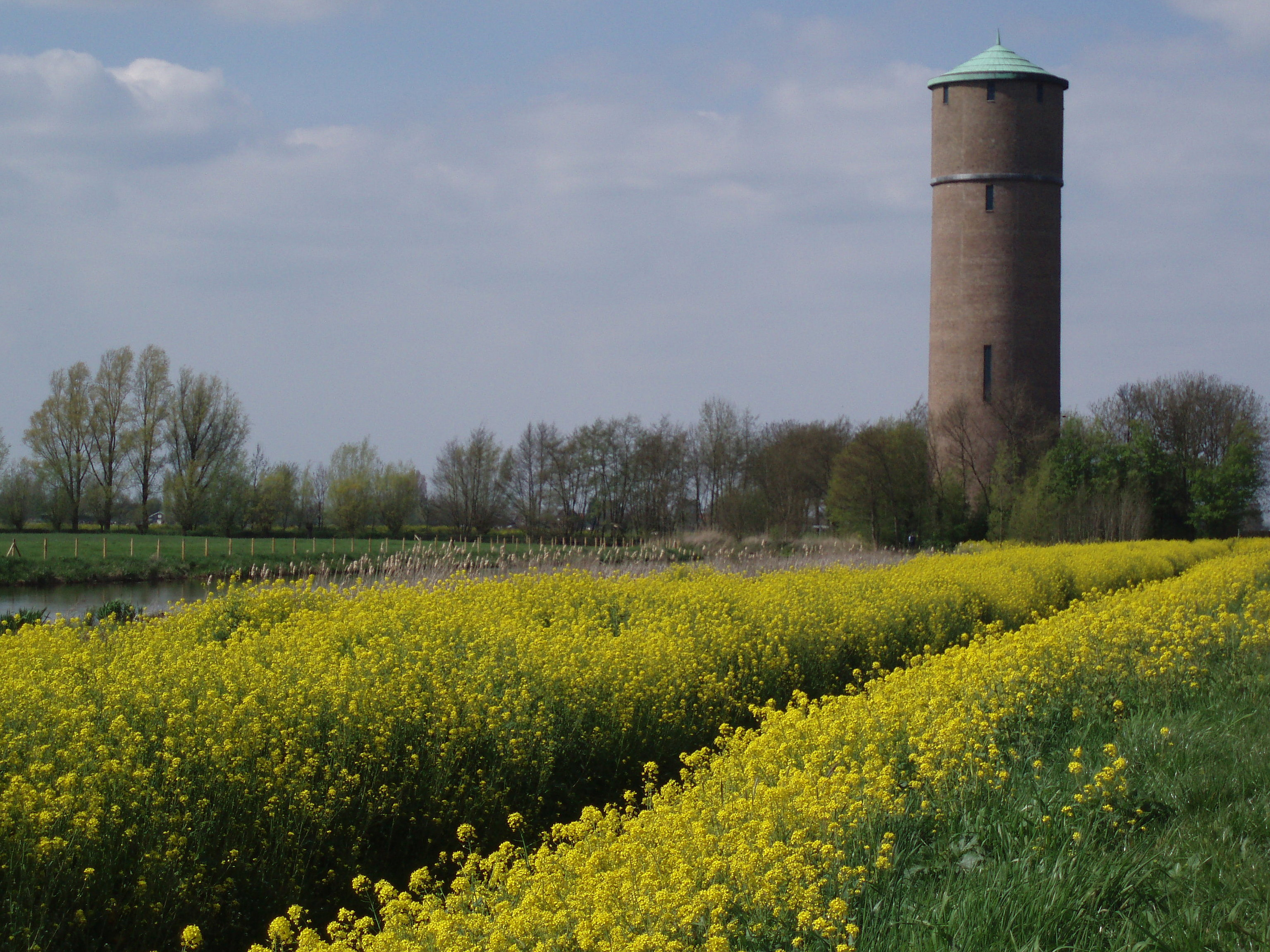
Lopik water tower

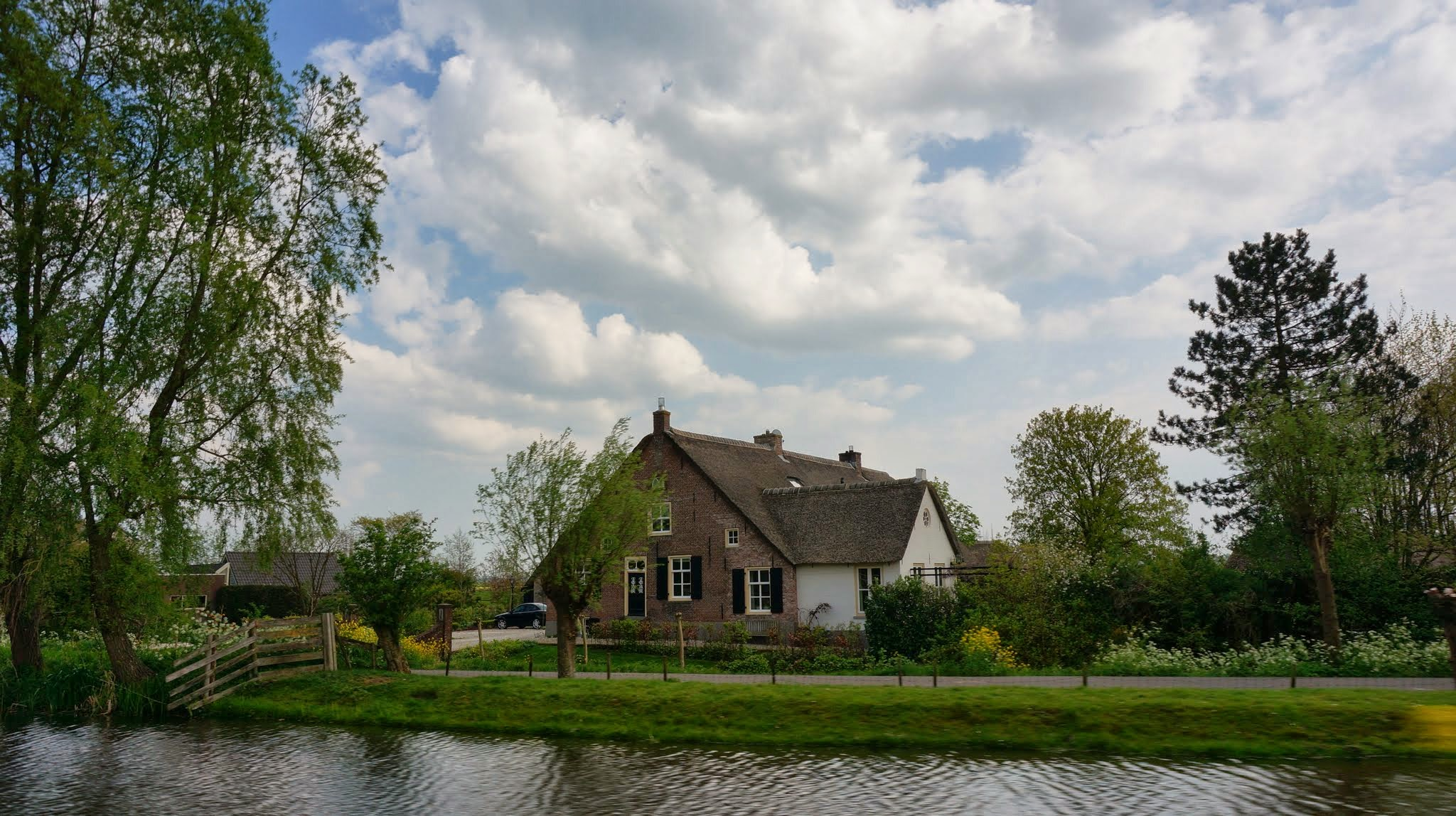
Lopik - panorama
