= Strien =

Strien (or van Strien) is a German Dutch surname. Notable people with the surname include:

- Gom van Strien (born 1951), Dutch politician
- Nicolaas Jan van Strien (1946–2008), Dutch zoologist and conservationist
- Pim van Strien (born 1977), Dutch politician
- Ton Strien (born 1958), Dutch politician
- Douglas Strien (born 1978), German businessman
