= Uitweg =

- Hamlet
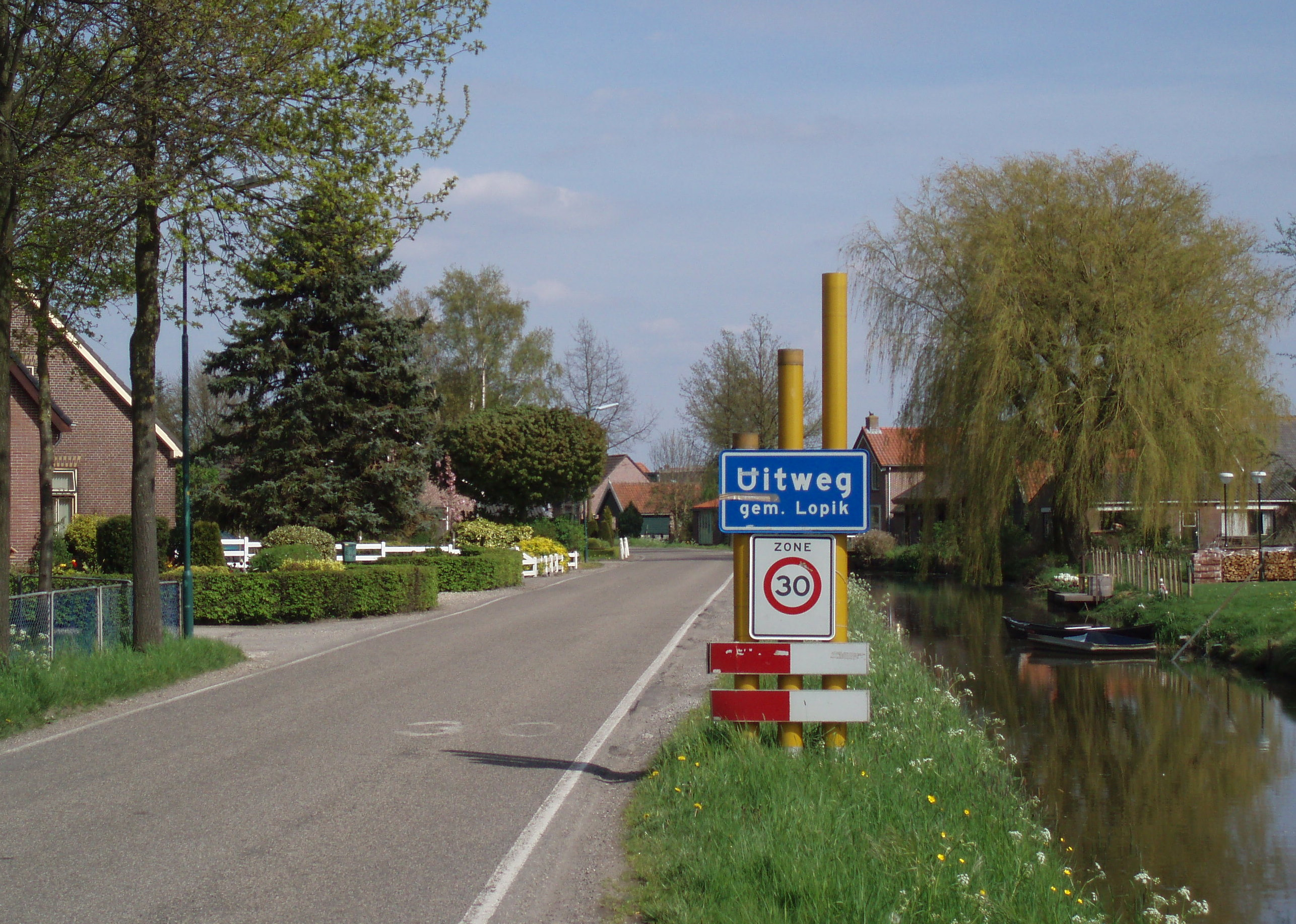
- Uitweg

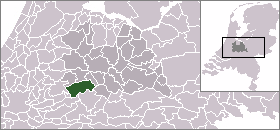

- Uitweg in the municipality of Lopik.
- Coordinates: 51°58′57″N 5°0′52″E
- Country: Netherlands
- Province: Utrecht (province)
- Municipality: Lopik

Area
  - Total: 1.00 km^{2} (0.39 sq mi)
- Elevation: 1 m (3.3 ft)

Population (2021)
  - Total: 610
  - Density: 610/km^{2} (1,600/sq mi)
- Time zone: UTC+1 (CET)
  - Summer (DST): UTC+2 (CEST)
- Postal code: 3412
- Dialing code: 030

Uitweg is a hamlet in the Dutch province of Utrecht. It is a part of the municipality of Lopik, and lies about 5 km southwest of IJsselstein. The town consists almost completely of a ribbon of farms along the Enge IJssel and Lopiker Wetering rivers, between Graaf and Lopikerkapel.

It was first mentioned between 1165 and 1169 as "inter viam que dicitur Vtweg" and means side road. The road is nowadays called Opweg. The postal authorities have placed it under Lopikerkapel. Uitweg has its own place name signs. The nature area De Horde was originally a river island. In 1860, it was turned into a peninsula by the creation of a dike.

== Gallery ==
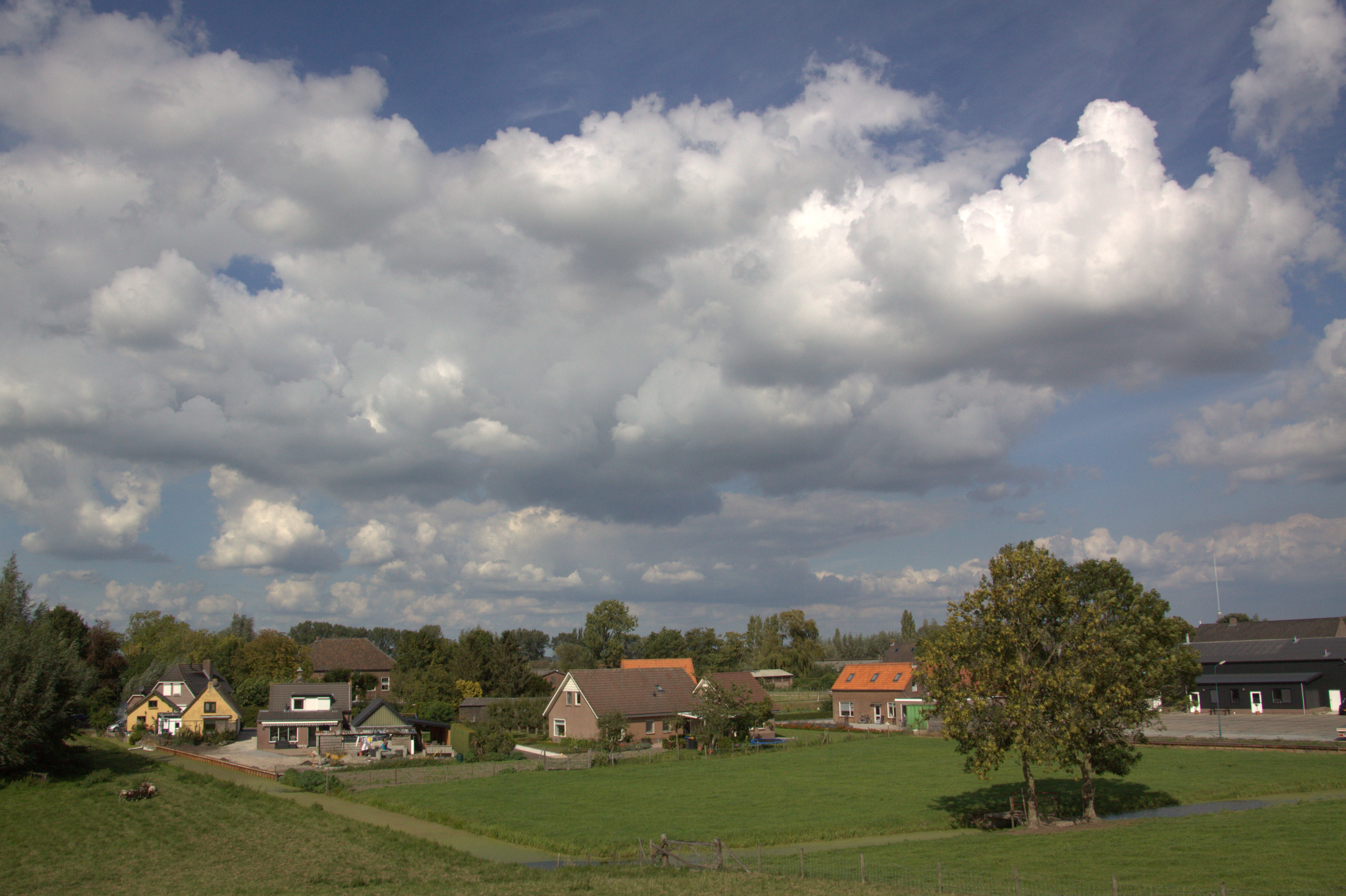
View on Uitweg

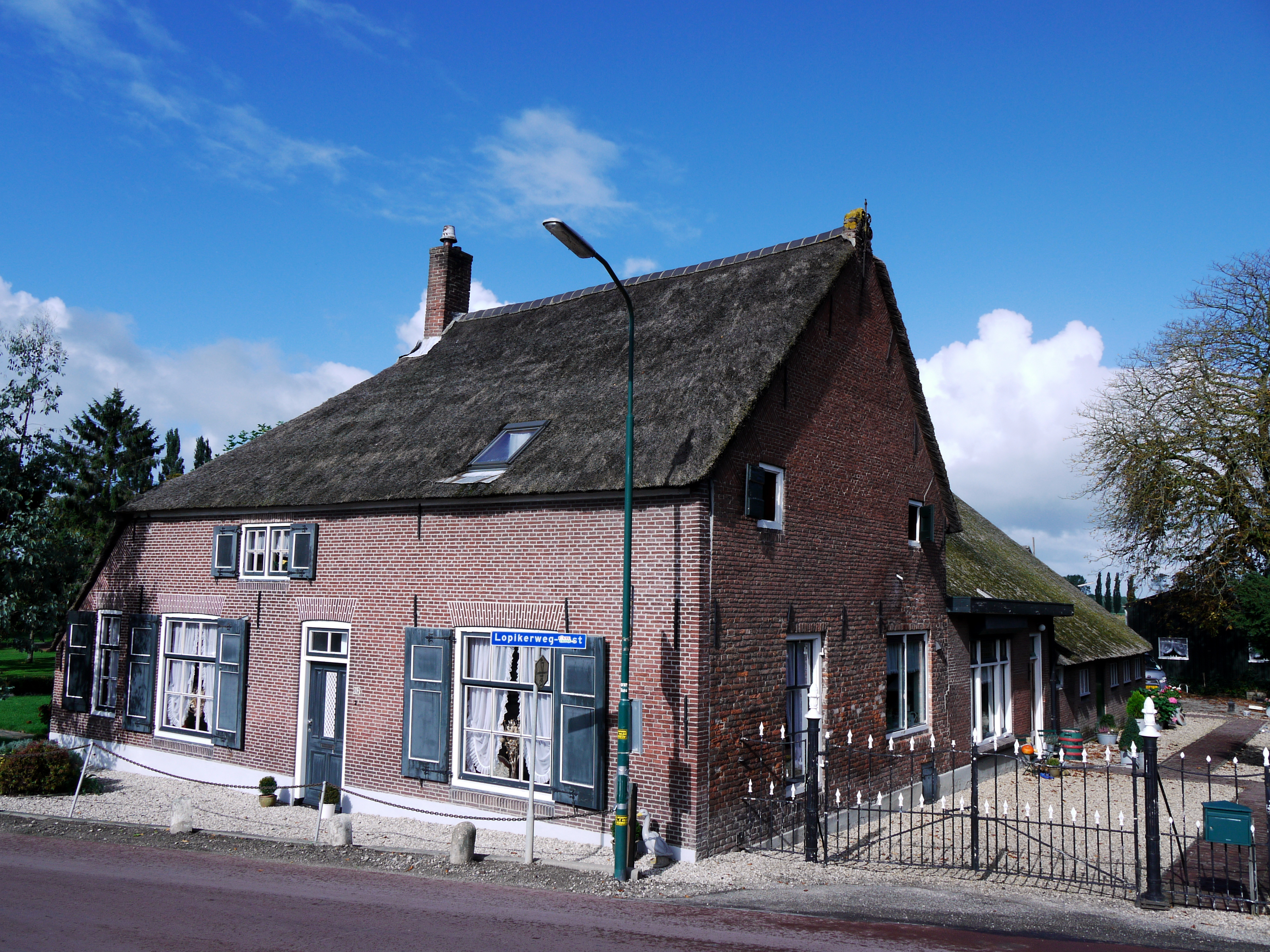
Farm in Uitweg

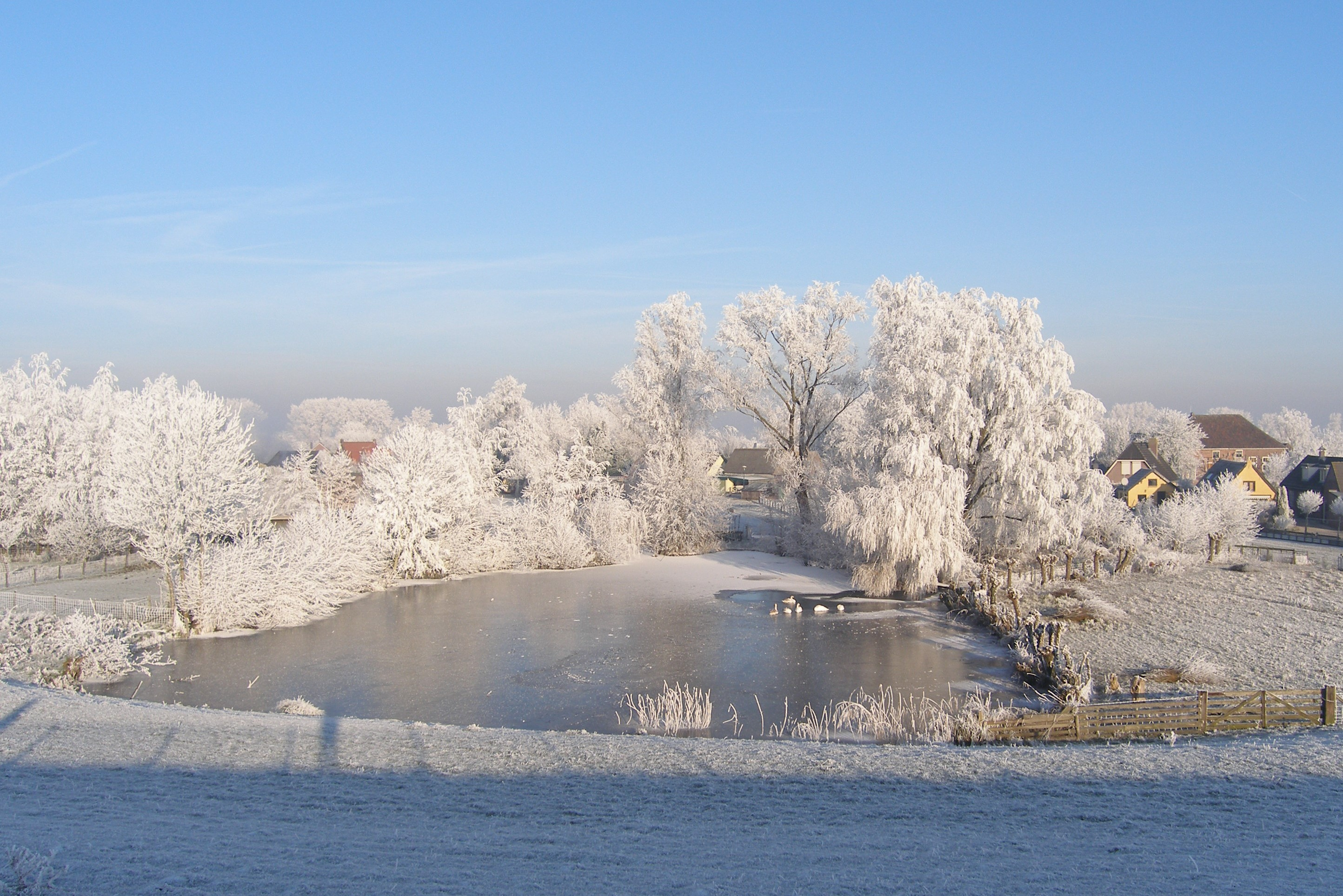
De Wiel in winter

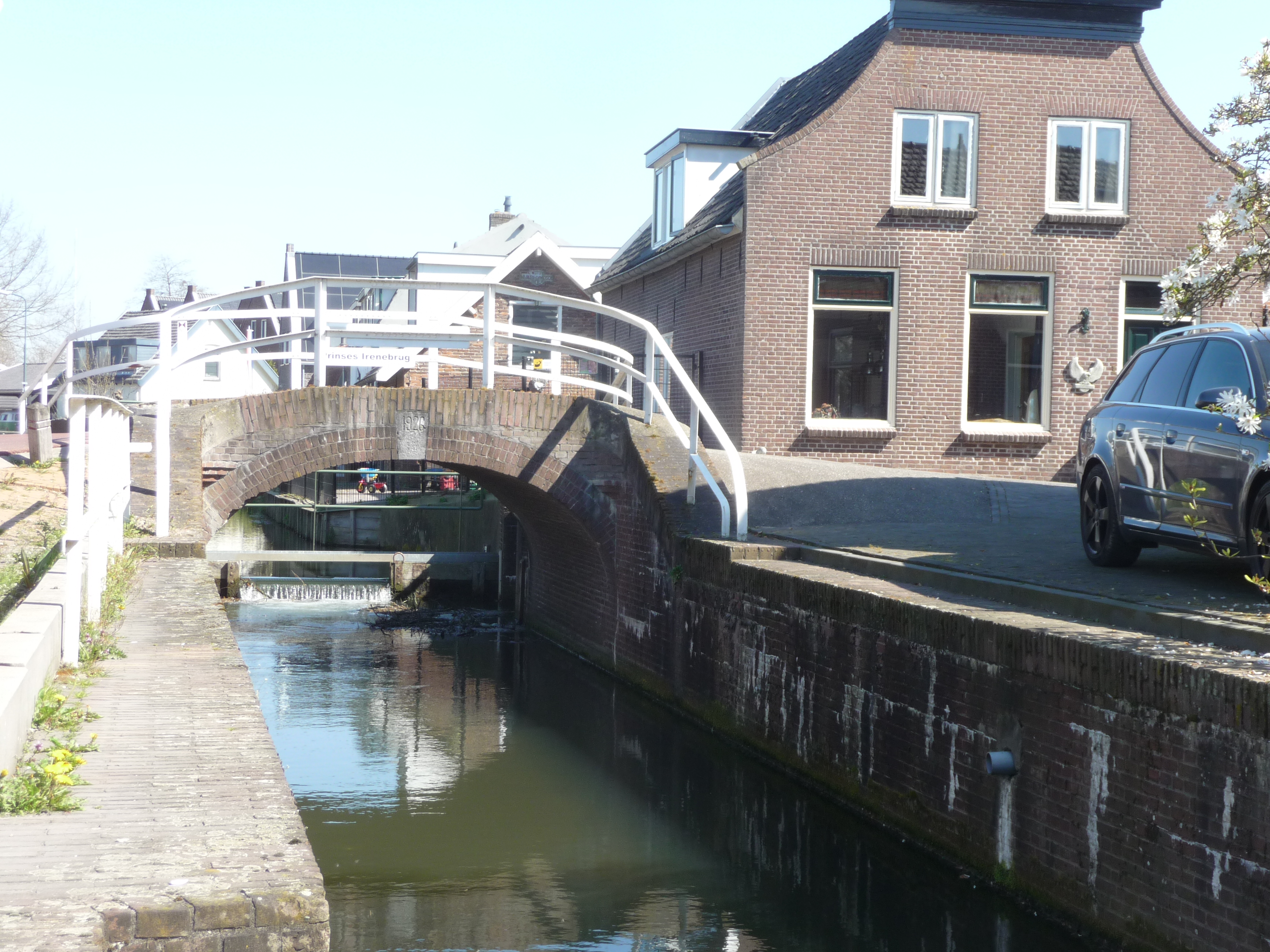
Street view
