= Kees van Buuren =

Dutch footballer

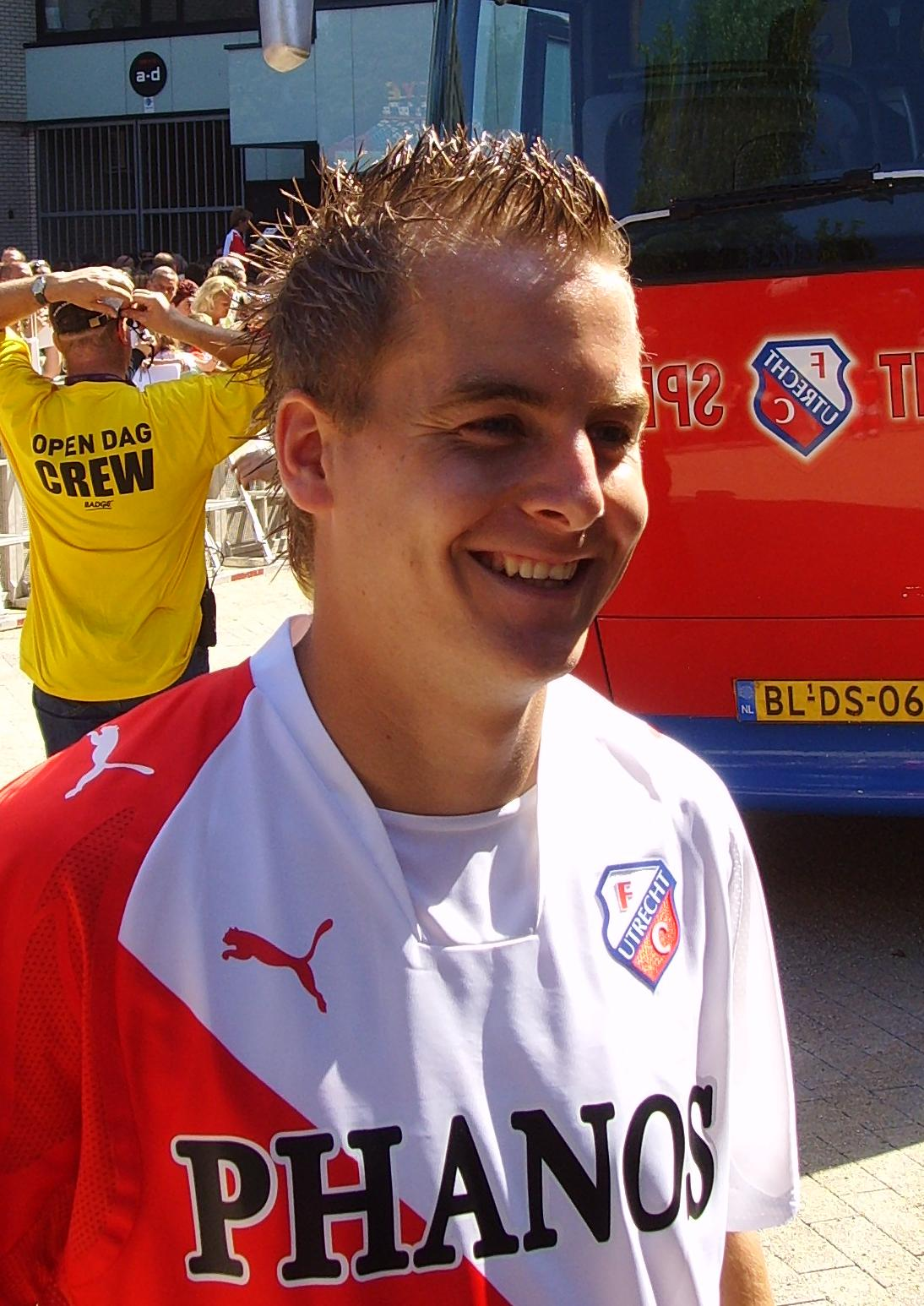

Personal information
- Full name: Kees van Buuren
- Date of birth: 27 July 1986 (age 40)
- Place of birth: Lopik, Netherlands
- Height: 1.76 m (5 ft 9 in)
- Position: Right back

Youth career
- SV Lopik
- VV Cabauw
- Elinkwijk

Senior career*
Years	Team	Apps	(Gls)
2005–2009	FC Utrecht	19	(0)
2009–2012	FC Den Bosch	94	(1)
2012–2014	Willem II	32	(0)
2014–2015	Sparta	33	(1)
2016–2018	Almere City	73	(1)
2018–2019	USV Hercules		
- * Club domestic league appearances and goals

Kees van Buuren (born 27 July 1986) is a retired Dutch footballer who played as a right back.

== Club career ==
Van Buuren is a defender who was born in Lopik and made his debut in professional football, being part of the FC Utrecht squad in the 2005–06 season. He was transferred to FC Den Bosch in 2009 and three years later, he joined Willem II. In the summer of 2014, he left on a free transfer to Sparta.

In January 2016, van Buuren left Sparta for Almere City. At the end of the 2018–19 season, van Buuren retired.

== Honours ==
=== Club ===
Willem II

- Eerste Divisie (1): 2013–14
