= Tjaarke Maas =

Dutch painter

Tjaarke Hendrika Maria Maas
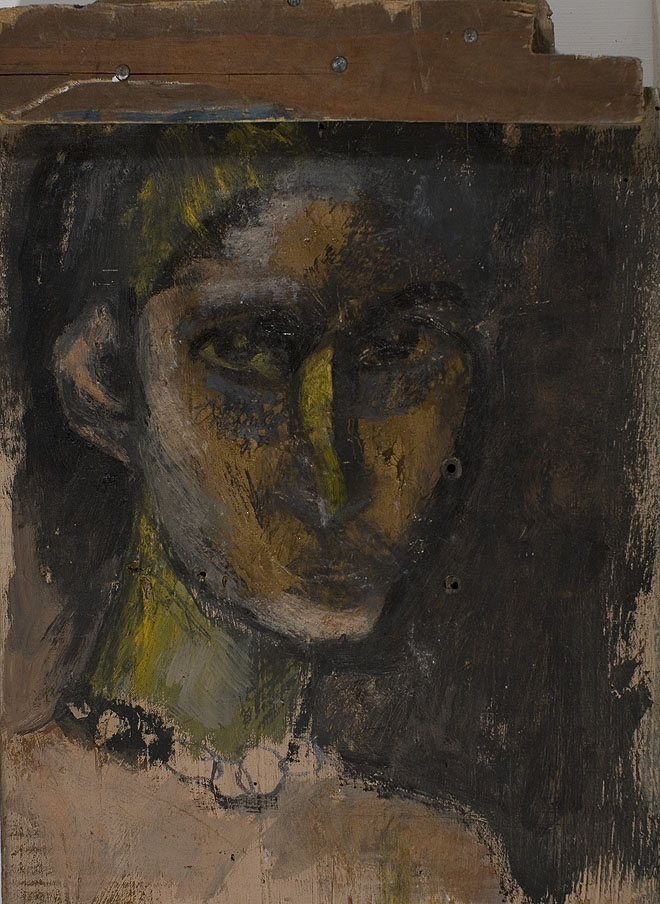
- "Self portrait with beads" mixed media, gold leaf on wood sm 34X24,5 Fiesole, Italy, 2000
- Born: Tjaarke Hendrika Maas; 26 October 1974; Lopik,(Prov.of Utrecht) Nederlands
- Died: June 2004 (aged 29); Assisi, Italy
- Known for: Painting, Drawing, Etching

Tjaarke Hendrika Maria Maas (26 October 1974 – June 2004) was a Dutch painter, whose work came to public attention in the late 1990s.

== Biography ==
Tjaarke Maas started to paint in her early childhood, in Tasmania, Australia, where her family had immigrated from the Netherlands. At the age of 17 she returned to Europe and studied at the Willem de Kooning Academy in Rotterdam. She continued her studies in New York, where she was introduced to the art of icon painting. At the age of 18, Maas was married, and to support her family began to work as a model, travelling extensively throughout Europe, visiting Japan and Australia.

From 1996 Maas lived in Florence, Italy, where she studied at the Accademia di Belle Arti di Firenze and graduated in 2003 with diploma cum laude. She combined painting and writing about icons with studying the theology of the image. At the same time, she also wrote poetry, prose and fairy-tales for children. She produced more than 500 artwork, consisting of paintings, etchings, drawings and sketches.

At age 26, Maas was diagnosed with bipolar disorder. A few years later, Maas found refuge in the forests surrounding the Hermit Monastery of St. Francis of Assisi (Eremo delle Carceri) to continue her work on icons as commissioned by the priest Don Gino. She died of a fall from one of the slopes of Monte Subasio, where she was found on 8 July 2004 at age 29. According to her sister, Marise Maas, her death was due to suicide and Tjaarke had vanished some time earlier. In a small cave, where Maas dwelt, her work on an unfinished icon, an image of the Transfiguration was found.

Her artwork had been exhibited in

- New York City,
- Jersey City, New Jersey,
- Florence, Italy
- Moscow, Russia
- St. Petersburg, Russia

In 2022 Tjaarke’s work was selected to participate in the 14th edition of International Biennale of Art of Rome taking place form 19th to 28 of November at the Museo Domiziano (Piazza Navona)

== Works ==
=== Portraits ===
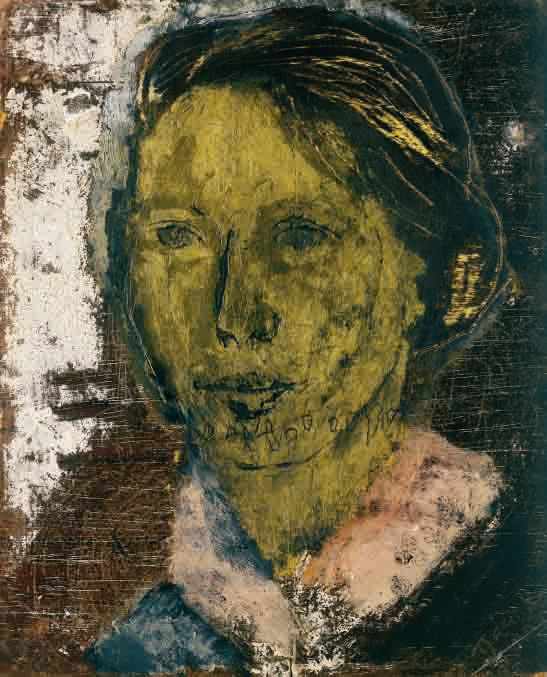
"Henny's teeth" Goldfaced series, egg tempera, gold leaf on wood),sm24.7x20, 2003

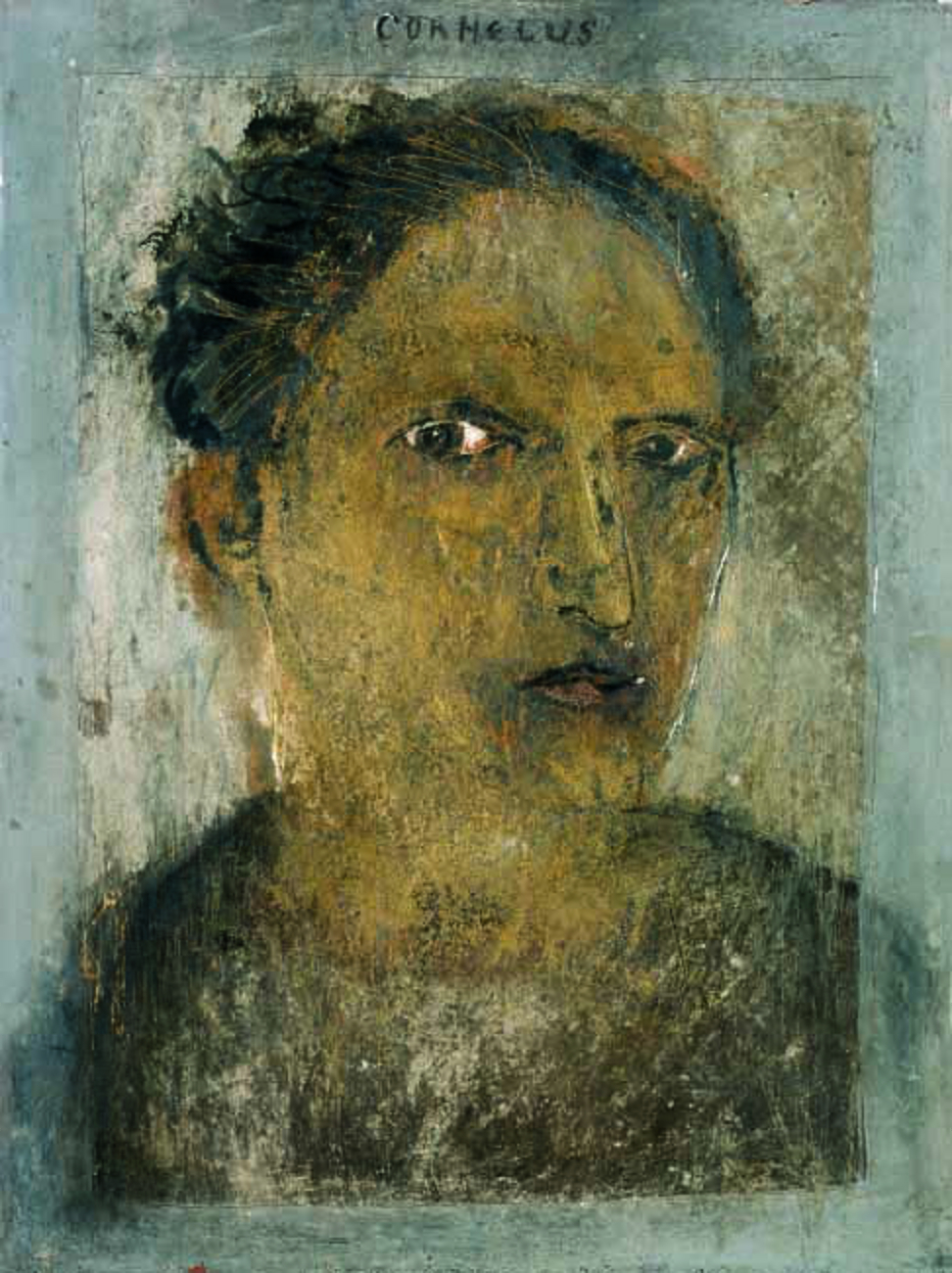
"Cornelius" Goldfaced series, mixed tech. on wood board, sm 32x24

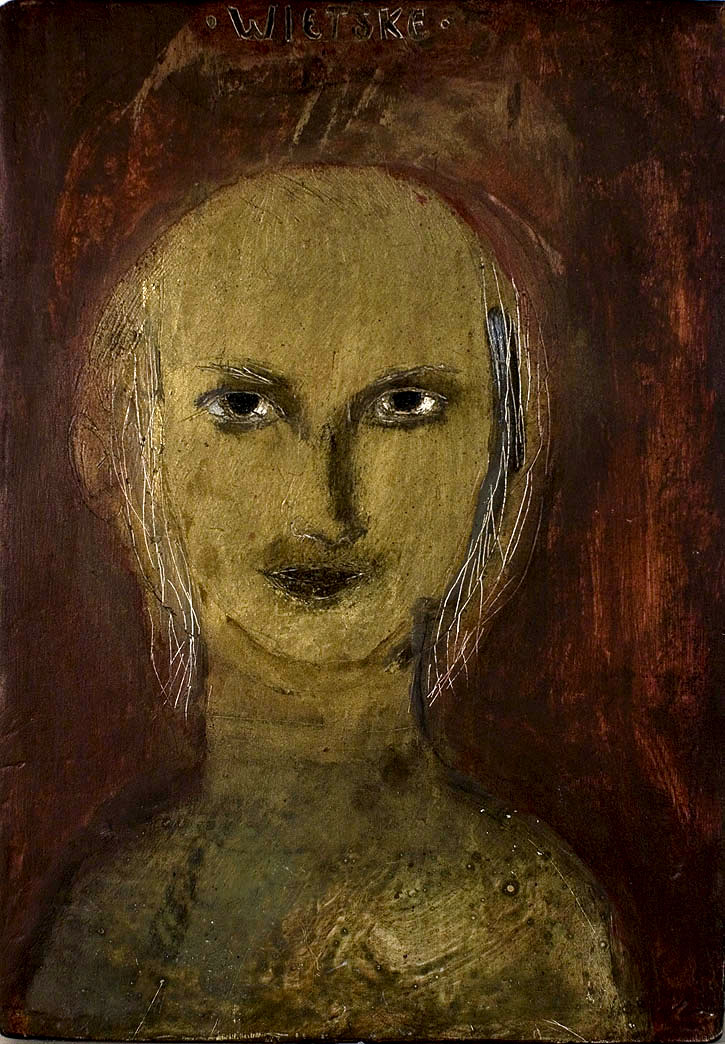
"Wietske" Goldfaced series oil, pigment on wood sm 32X22.5

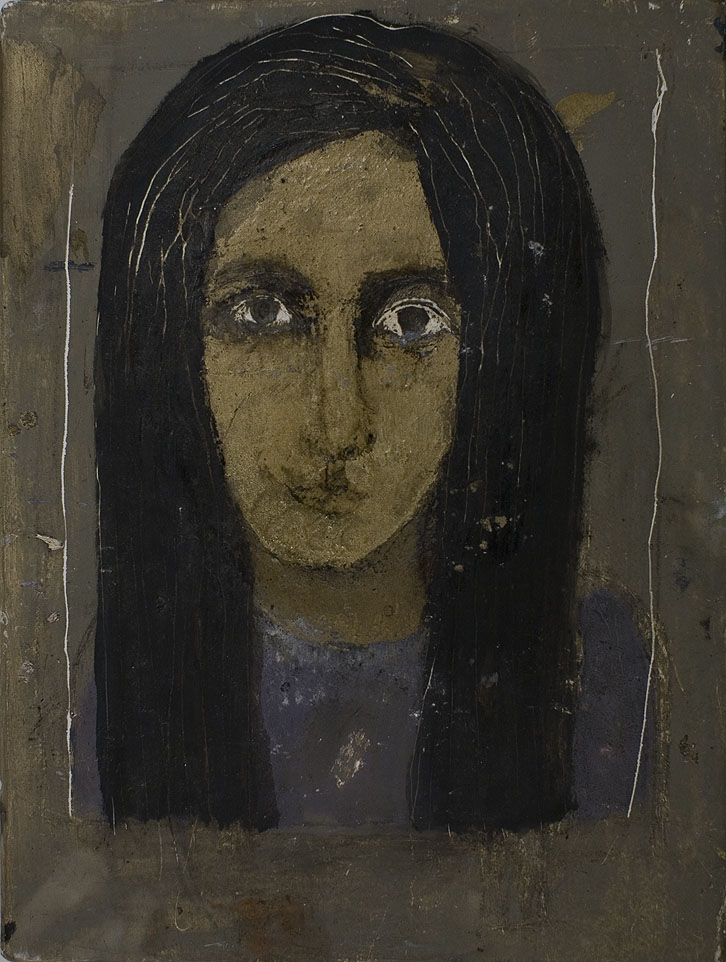
"Friend" Goldfaced series, egg tempera, gold leaf on wood 32X24,5

=== Birds ===
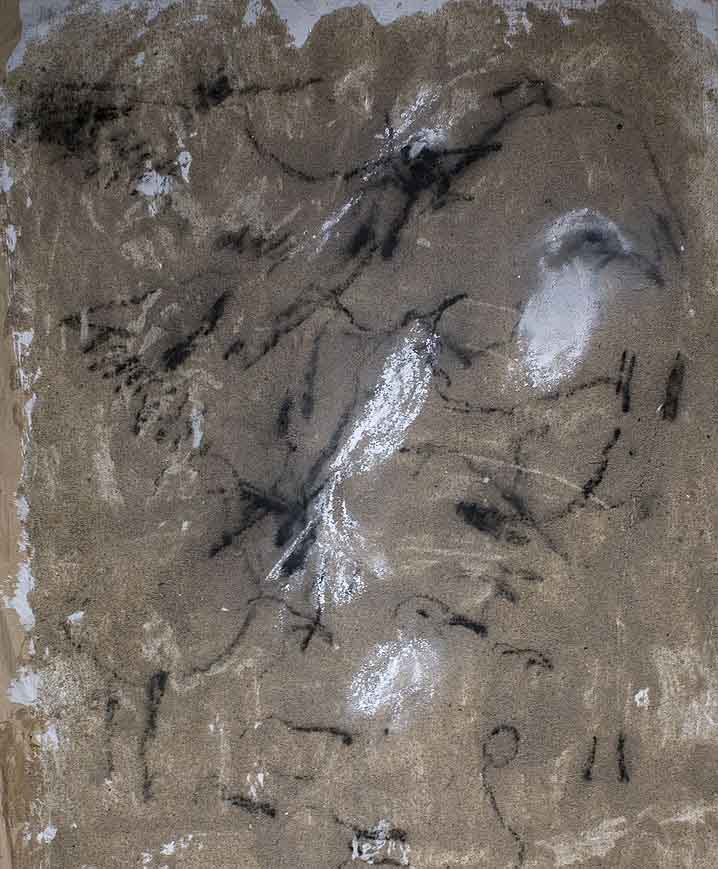
"Seagulls" series, mixed media on gesso-ed paper, sm.73X50

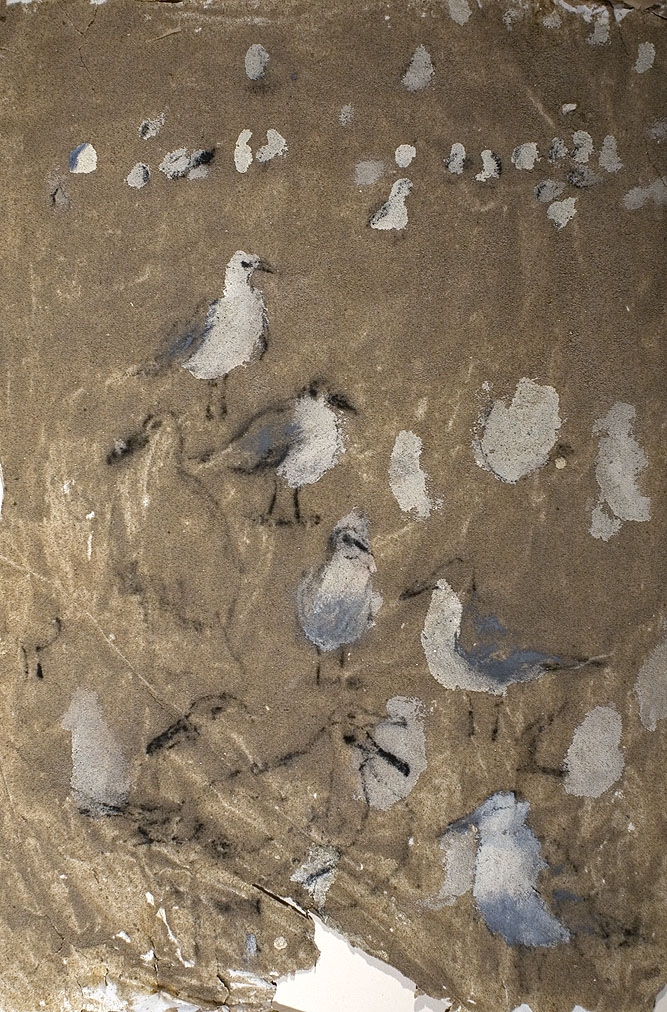
"Seagulls" series, mixed media on gesso-ed paper, sm 72X51.5

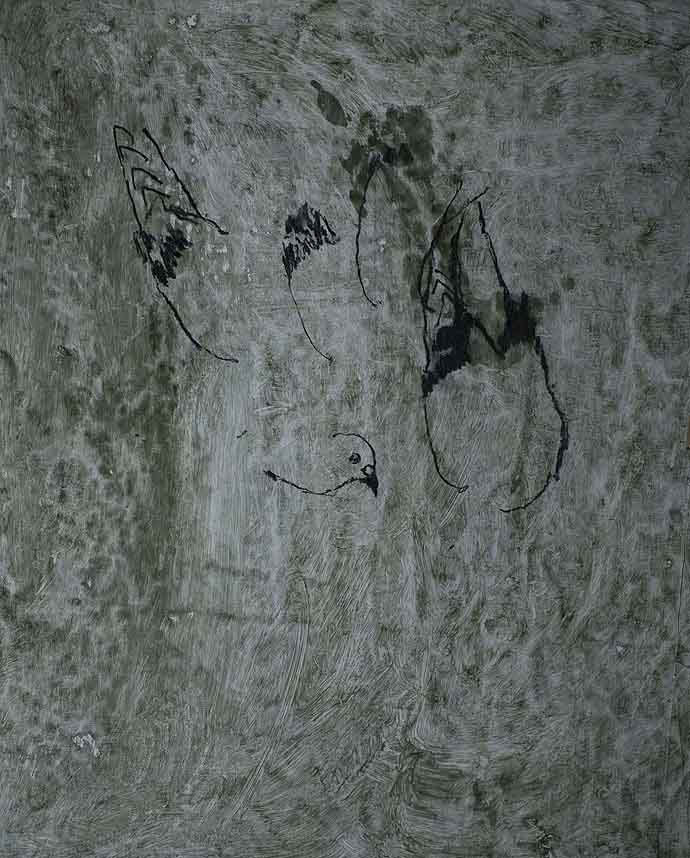
"Findings on pietra serena" Guatemala series, mixed media,on gesso-ed paper, sm.63X51

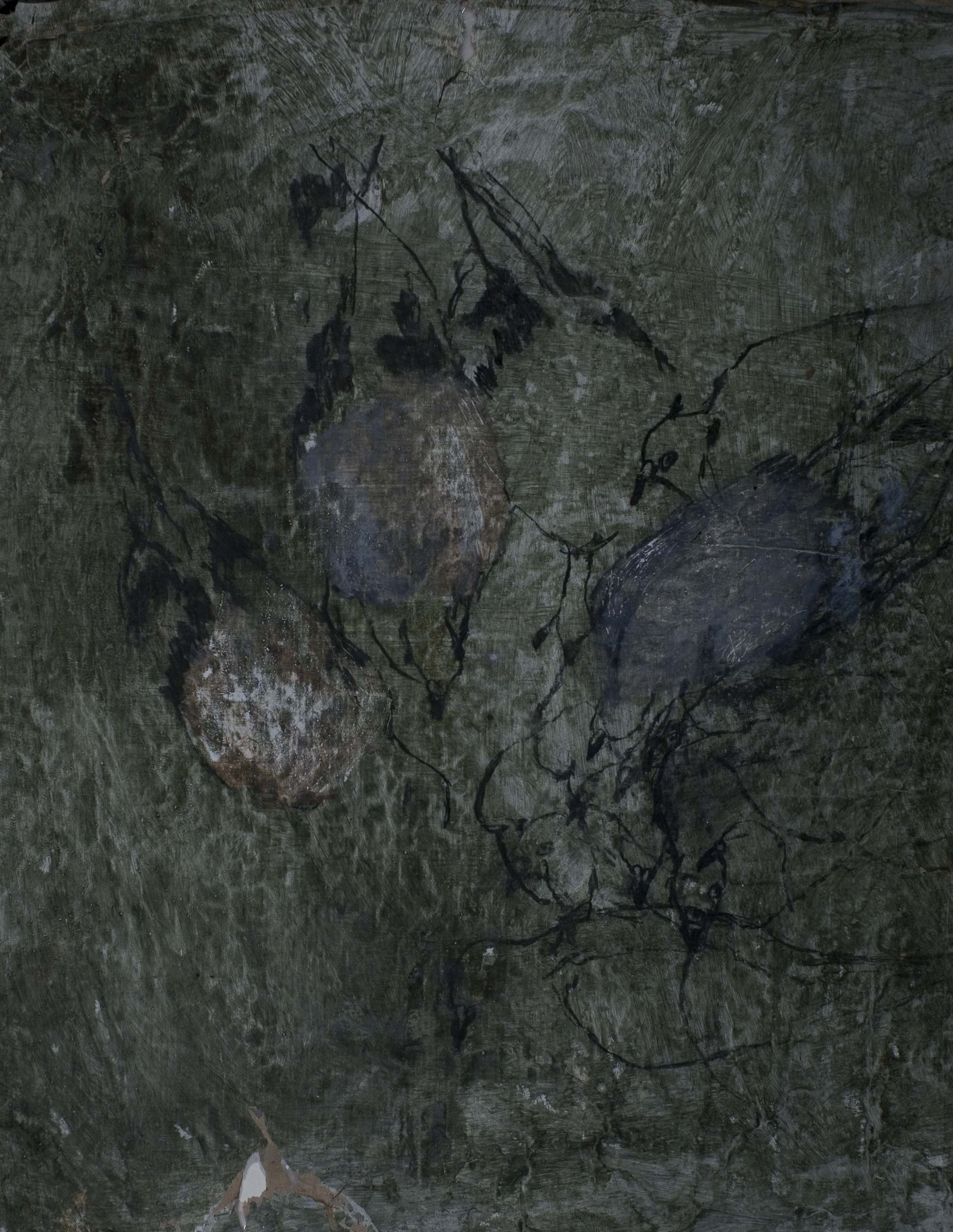
"Pegions" Guatemala series, mixed media on gesso-ed paper sm. 60X50

=== Still life ===
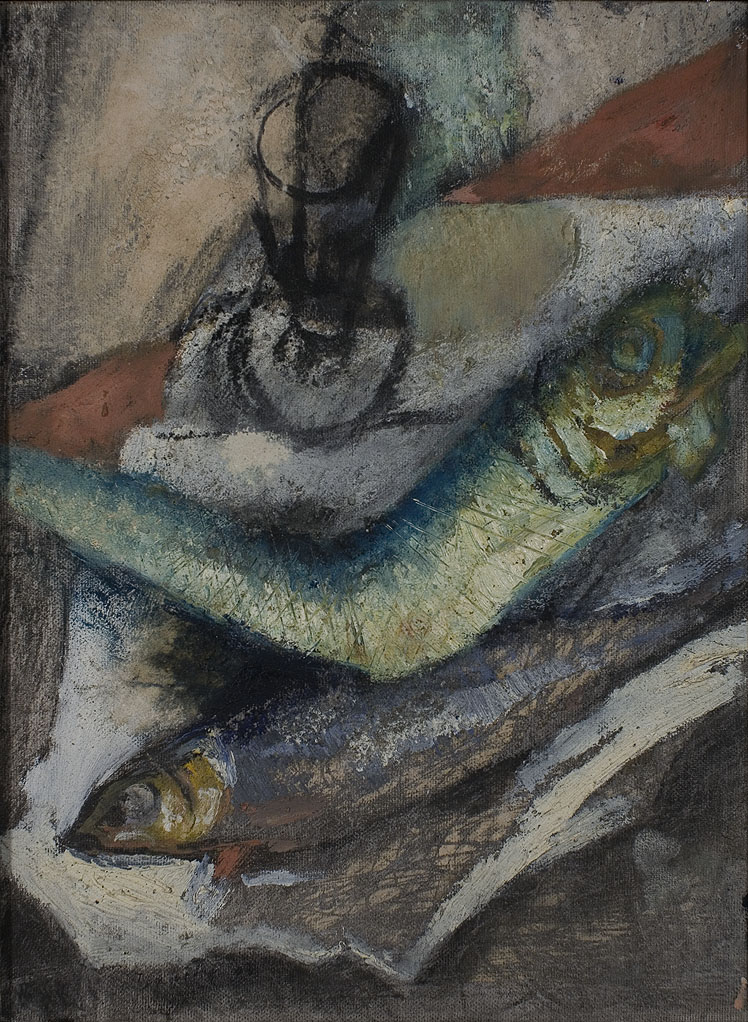
"Ode to 1930th" (fish composition with glass) oil on canvas sm.40X30

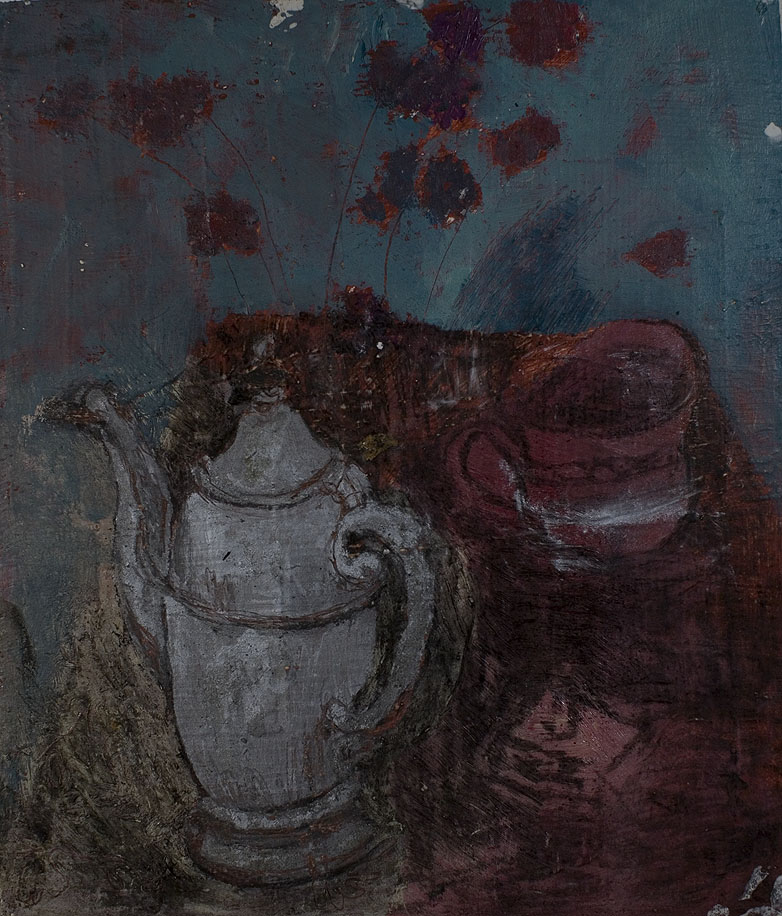
"Silver tea-pot" 2003, mixed media on wood, sm. 40,5X35

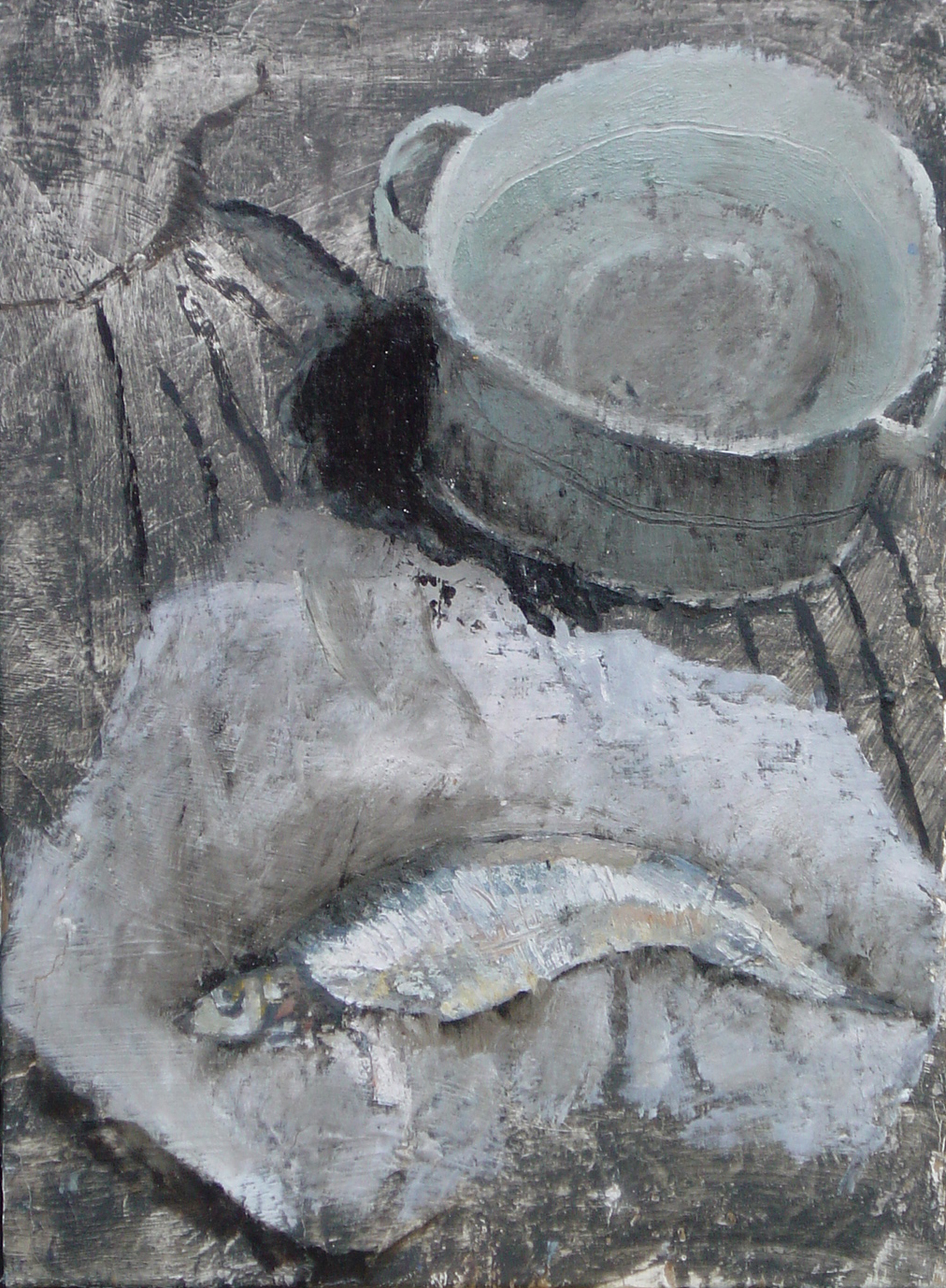
"Dutch Herring with pot" (mixed media on canvas) sm 50x70

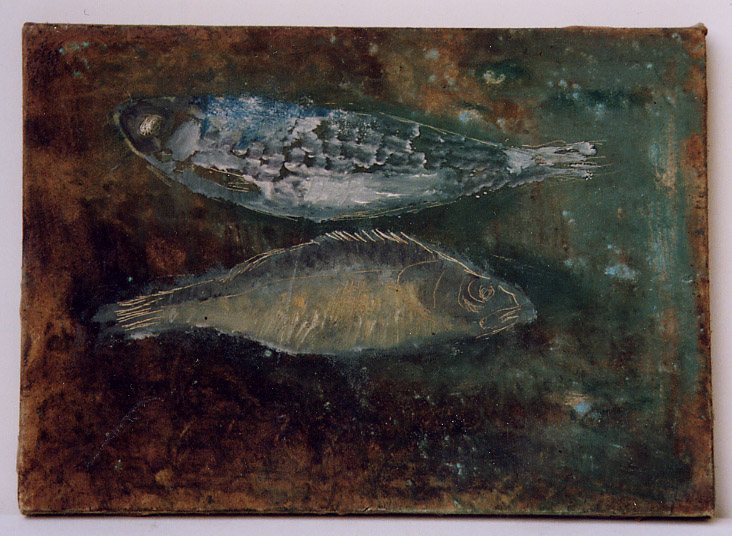
"Catacomb fish" mixed media on canvas sm.19.5X27

=== Icons ===
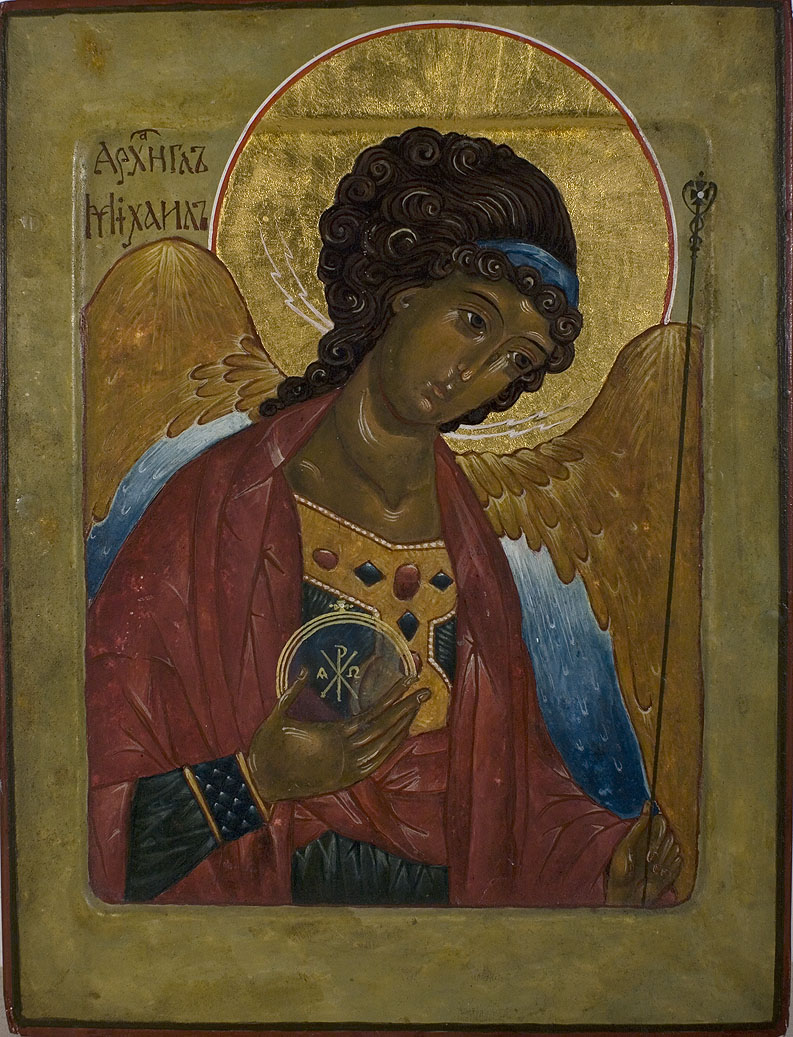
"St.Archangel Michael" egg tempera, gold leaf on wood, sm 32x24

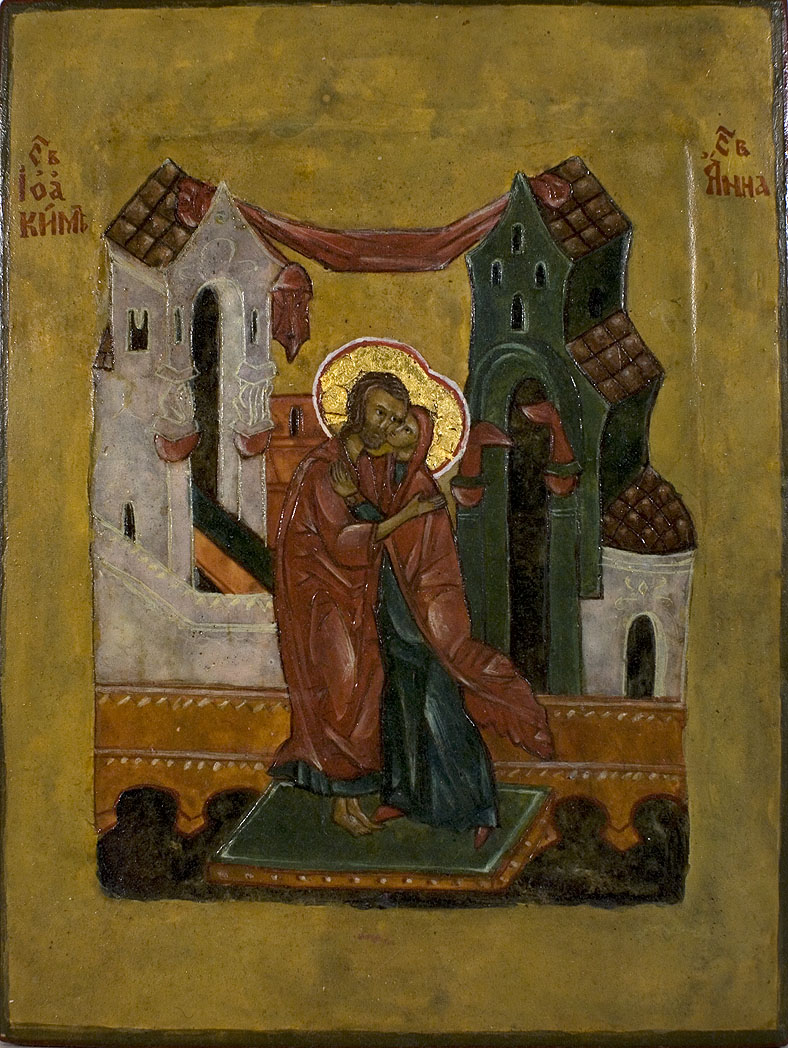
"St.Jiokim and St.Anna" egg tempera, gold leaf on wood, sm 32x24

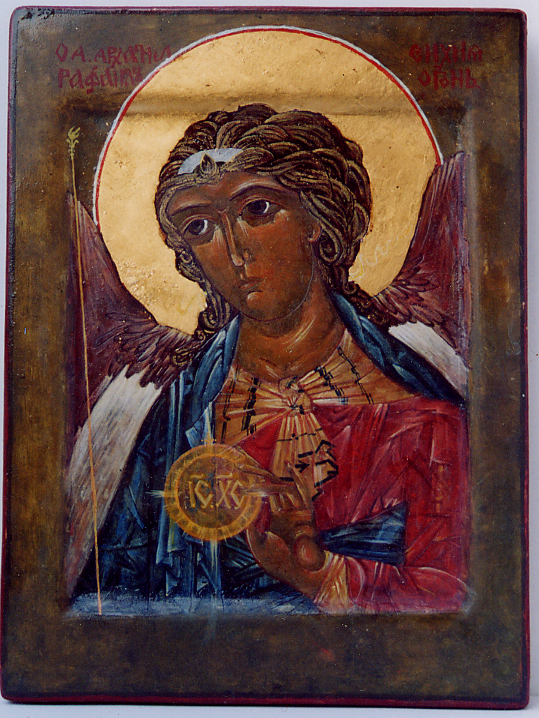
"St.Archangel Raphael", egg tempera, goldleaf on wood, sm 32x24

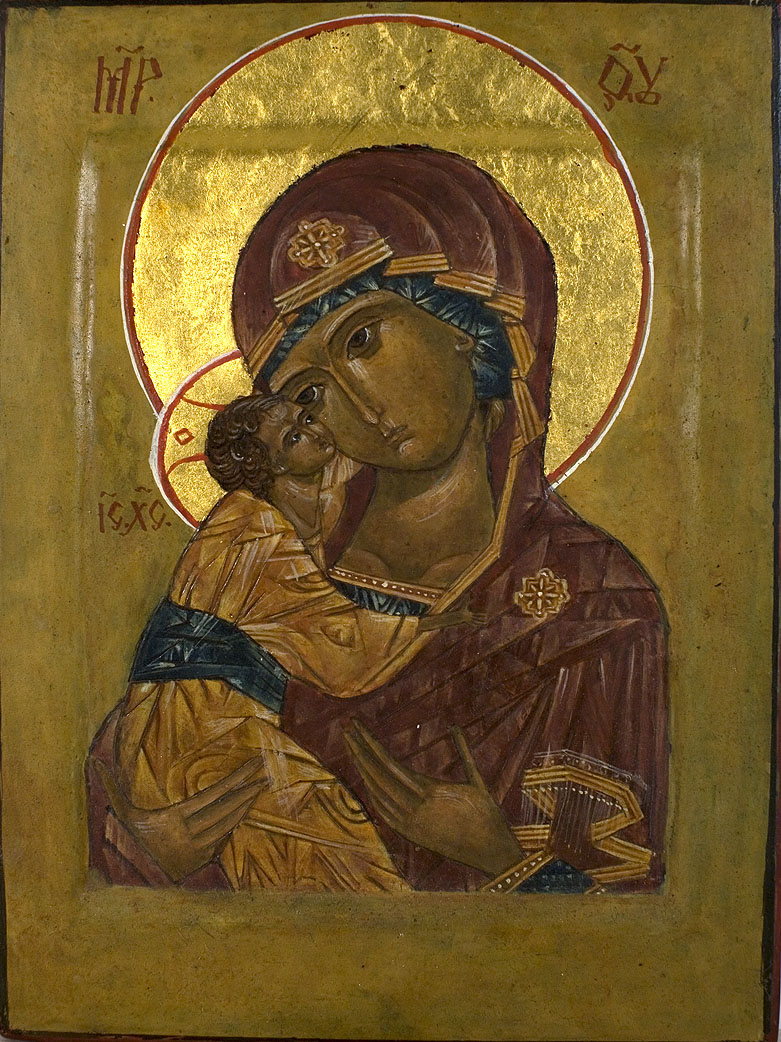
"Theotokos" "Eleusa" (Merciful) egg tempera, gold leaf on wood, sm 32x24
