= Kees van Ieperen =

Dutch sports shooter

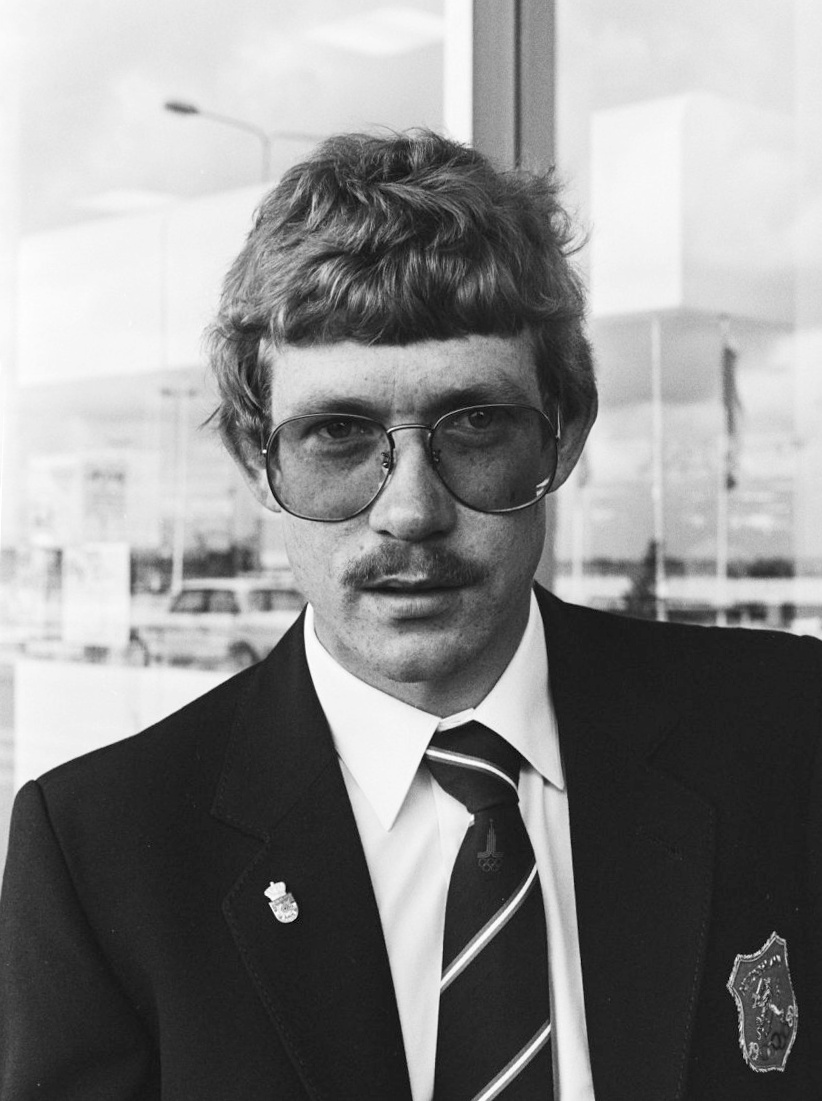
- Kees van Ieperen in 1980

Personal information
- Born: 15 January 1956 (age 70) Lopikerkapel, the Netherlands
- Height: 1.80 m (5 ft 11 in)
- Weight: 72 kg (159 lb)

Sport
- Sport: Shooting

Cornelis Adrianus "Kees" van Ieperen (born 15 January 1956) is a retired shooter from the Netherlands. He competed in Olympic skeet at the 1980 Summer Olympics and finished in 11th place.
