= Ton Strien =

Dutch politician

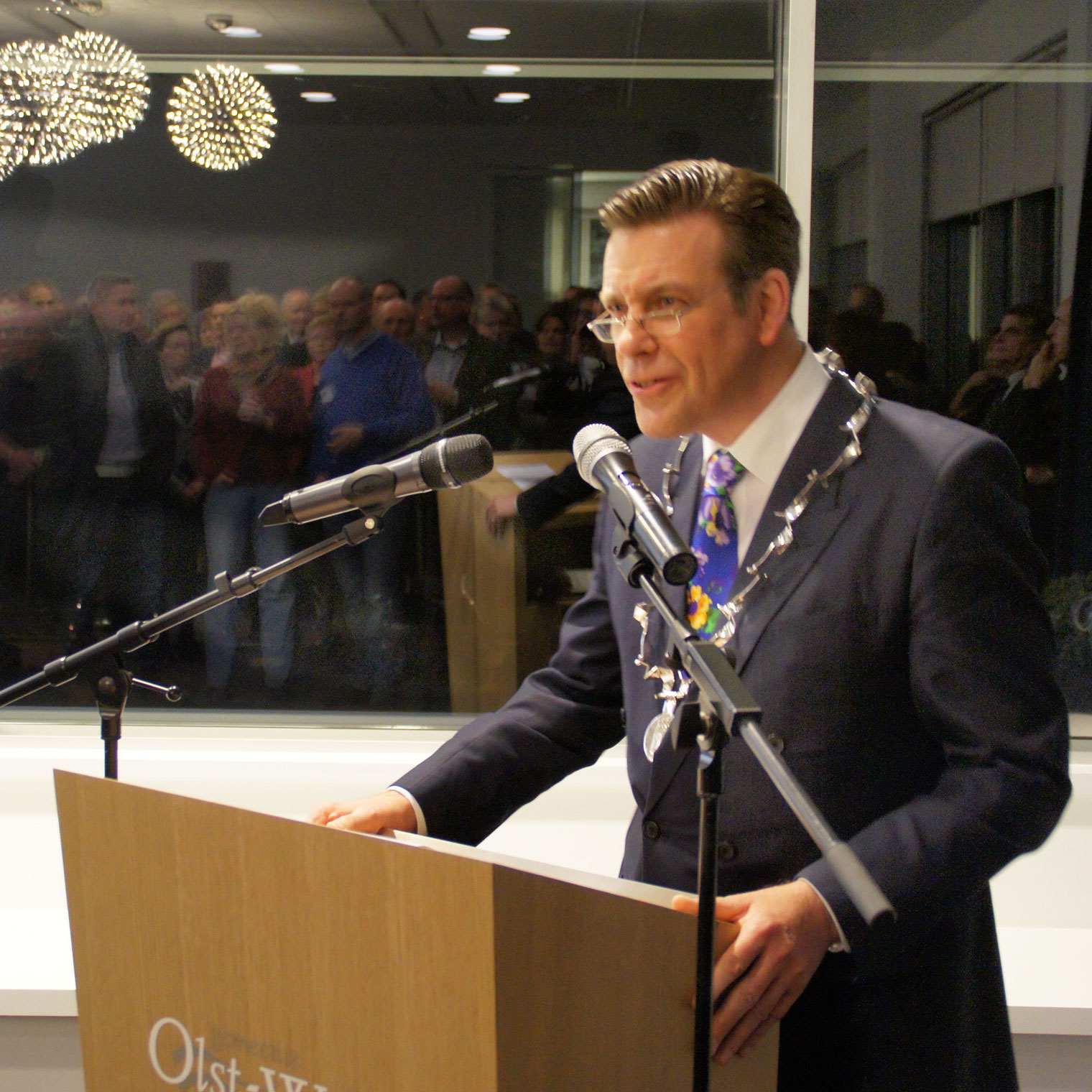
A.G.J. Strien

A.G.J. (Ton) Strien (born 23 March 1958 in Lopik) is a Dutch politician of the Christian Democratic Appeal (CDA). Strien has served as Mayor of Olst-Wijhe from 1 September 2007 until 1 september 2022. He has also been vice president and treasurer of the National Association CDA.

Previously he was a member of the provincial parliament of Utrecht, an alderman of Houten and also a member of the municipal council of this municipality.

Strien started his career as a civil servant.
