= Jaarsveld =

- Village
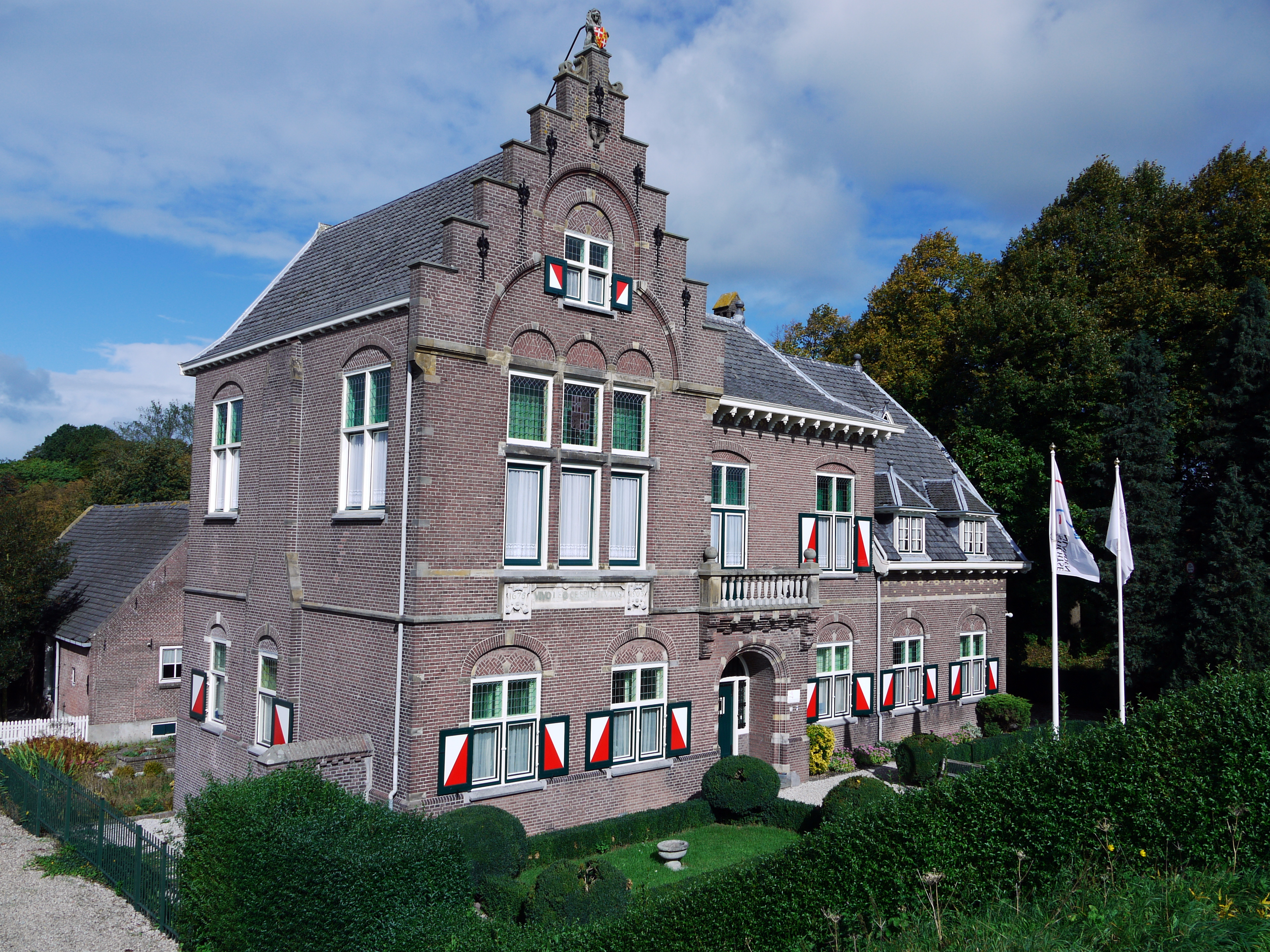
- Polderhuis

- Location in the Netherlands Jaarsveld (Netherlands)
- Coordinates: 51°58′0″N 4°59′0″E
- Country: Netherlands
- Province: Utrecht
- Municipality: Lopik

Area
  - Total: 0.31 km^{2} (0.12 sq mi)
- Elevation: 0.8 m (2.6 ft)

Population (2021)
  - Total: 275
  - Density: 890/km^{2} (2,300/sq mi)
- Time zone: UTC+1 (CET)
  - Summer (DST): UTC+2 (CEST)
- Postal code: 3413

Jaarsveld is a village in the Dutch province of Utrecht. It is a part of the municipality of Lopik, and lies about 7 km southwest of IJsselstein.

Jaarsveld used to be a separate municipality, covering a large part of the current municipality of Lopik south of the Lopiker Wetering and Enge IJssel rivers. It merged with the municipality of Lopik in 1943. A large part of the town of Lopik is actually built in the former municipality of Jaarsveld.

== History ==
The village was first mentioned in 1331 as Jaarsfelt, and means (peat concession) field of Jaar (person).

During the middle ages until 1795, Jaarsveld was a vrije en hoge heerlijkheid. As a free a high fief, Jaarsveld was an independent of the provinces Holland or Utrecht, like the larger Barony of IJsselstein to the east. In 1795, at the founding of the Batavian Republic, all heerlijkheden and noble rights were abolished.

The Dutch Reformed Church dates from the 15th century and has 14th century elements. Castle Jaarsveld was built in the 14th century, but destroyed in 1672 by the French. Around 1760, the manor house Huis Jaarsveld was built to the north-west of the castle and was expanded in 1867. In 1840, Jaarsveld was home to 1,079 people, however that included the hamlets of Jaarsvelderkapel and Graaf.

== Gallery ==
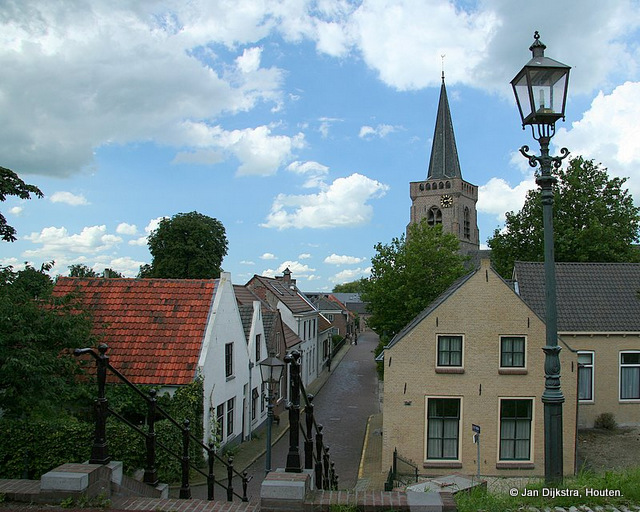
Village view

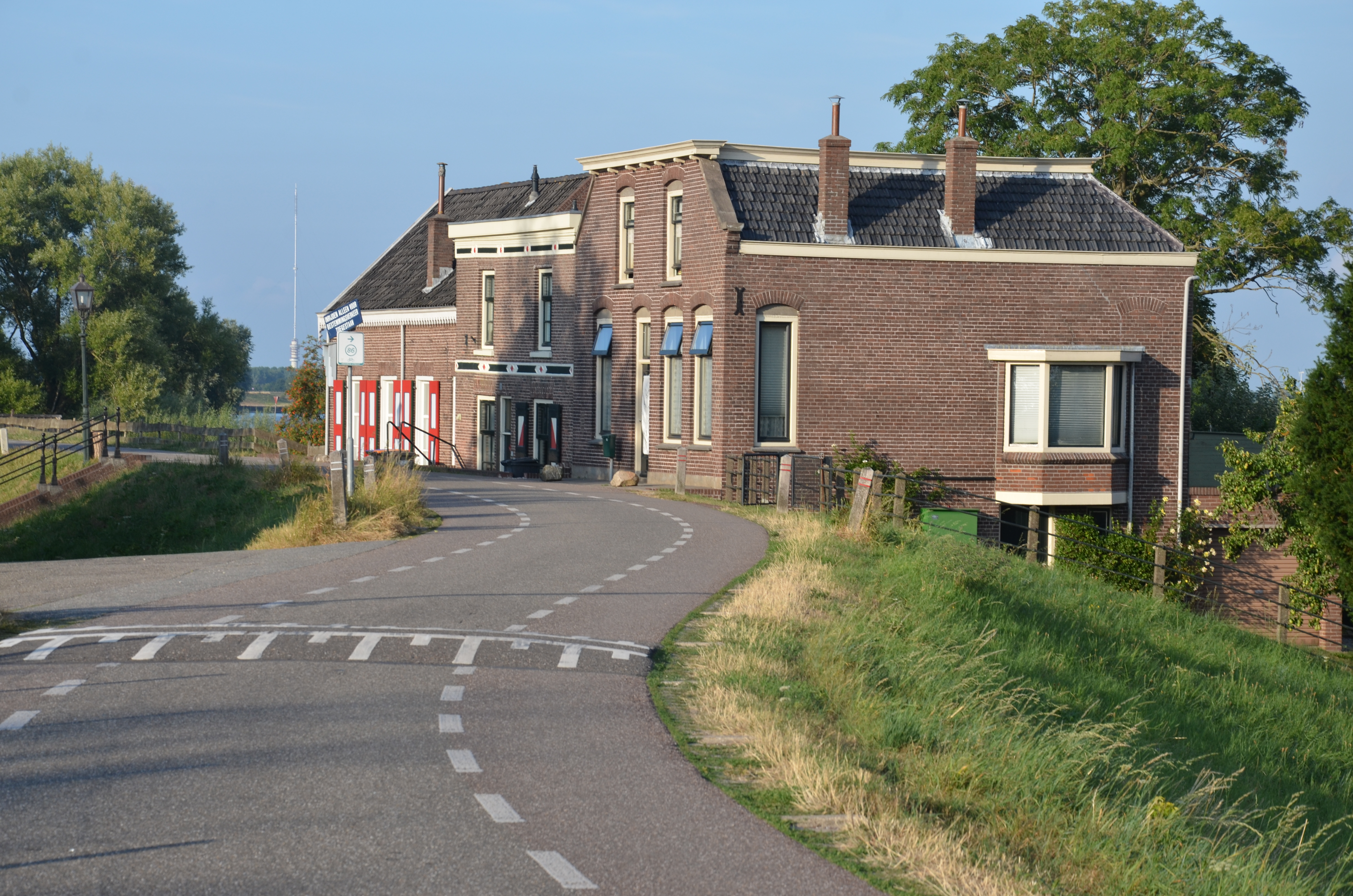
Houses along the dike

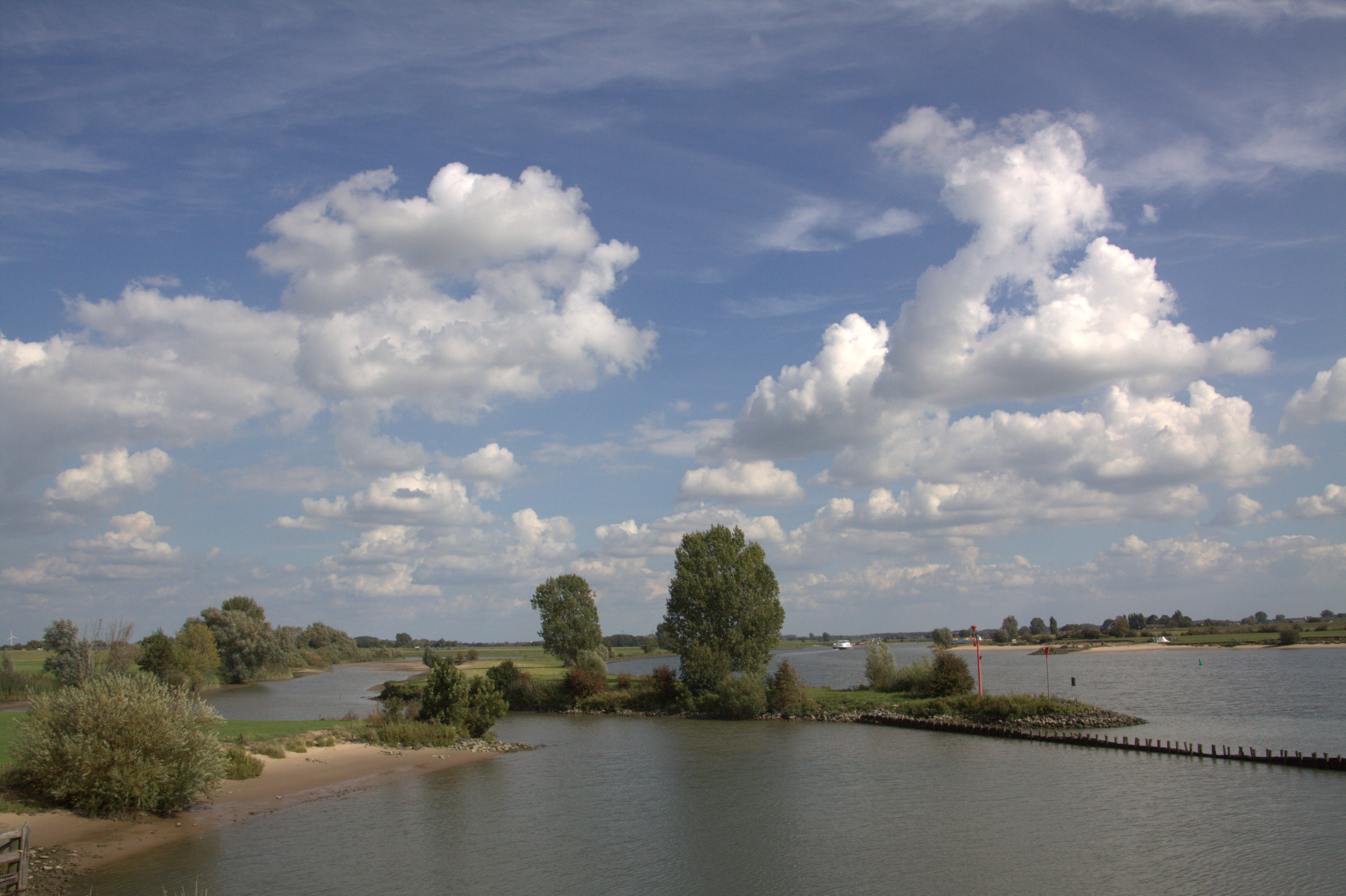
Nature area De Horde

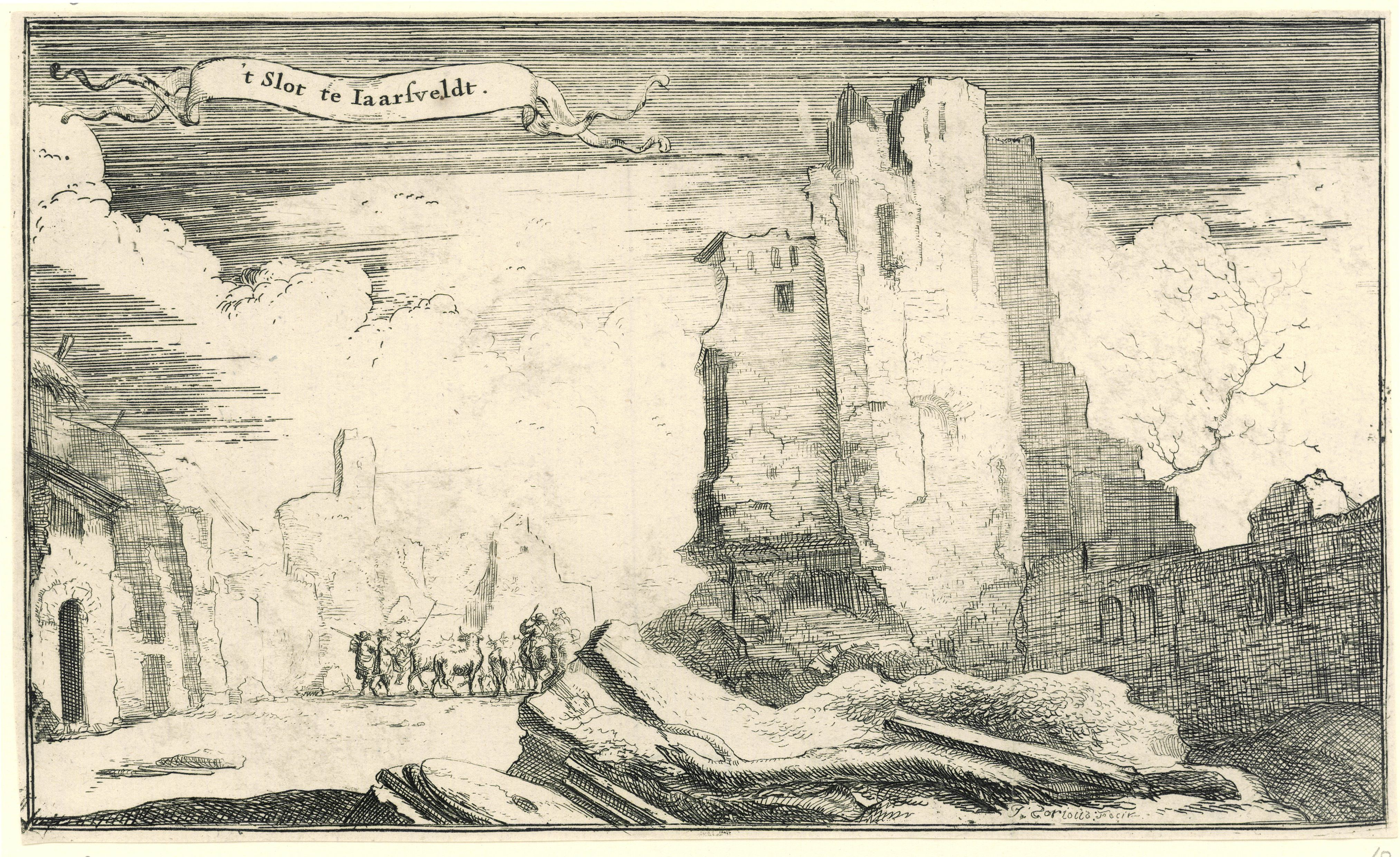
Ruins of Castle Jaarsveld (1672-1676)
