= Lopikerkapel =

- Village
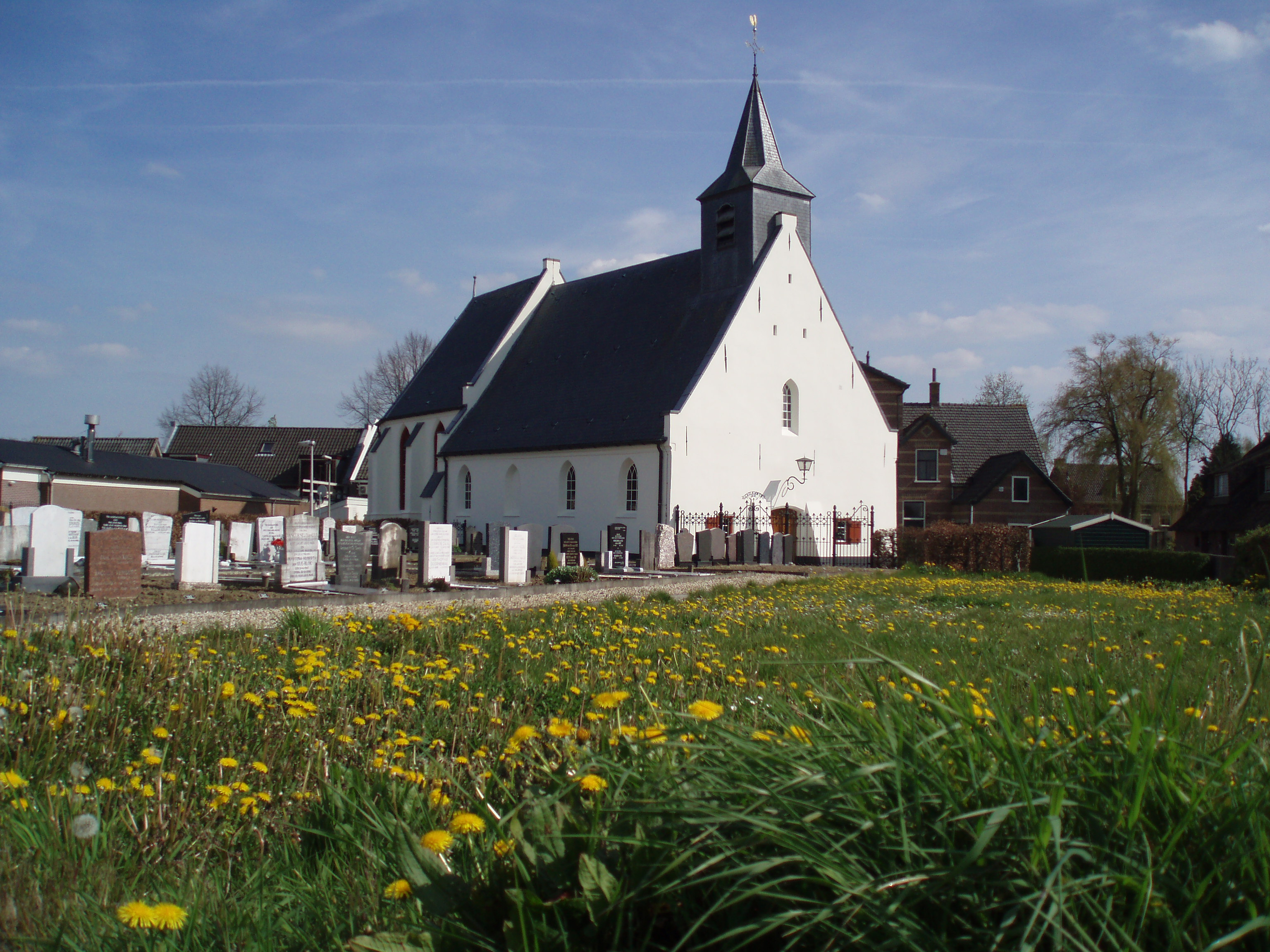
- Church

- Location in the Netherlands Lopikerkapel (Netherlands)
- Coordinates: 51°59′31″N 5°2′50″E
- Country: Netherlands
- Province: Utrecht
- Municipality: Lopik

Area
  - Total: 1.04 km^{2} (0.40 sq mi)
- Elevation: 1 m (3.3 ft)

Population (2021)
  - Total: 550
  - Density: 530/km^{2} (1,400/sq mi)
- Time zone: UTC+1 (CET)
  - Summer (DST): UTC+2 (CEST)
- Postal code: 3412
- Dialing code: 030

Lopikerkapel is a village in the Dutch province of Utrecht. It is a part of the municipality of Lopik, and lies about 3 km south of IJsselstein. The village has a small centre, with a church, but mostly consists of a ribbon of farms on both sides of the Enge IJssel river. The name Lopikerkapel means "Lopik's chapel".

== History ==
The village was first mentioned between 1381 and 1383 as Loepwiker capelle. Lopikerkapel developed as a linear settlement along the Enge IJssel. It was mainly an agricultural community. The chapel probably dated from the 13th century, and was replaced in the 15th century by the current church.

Huis te Vliet was built near the original chapel in the 14th century, and was originally a fortified tower. In 1856, it was extensively modified, but was reduced in size to a more modest building in 1937. In 1840, Lopikerkapel was home to 240 people.

The Nozema building is a former radio station built in 1935 in Dudok architecture. It remained in use until 2009.

== Gallery ==
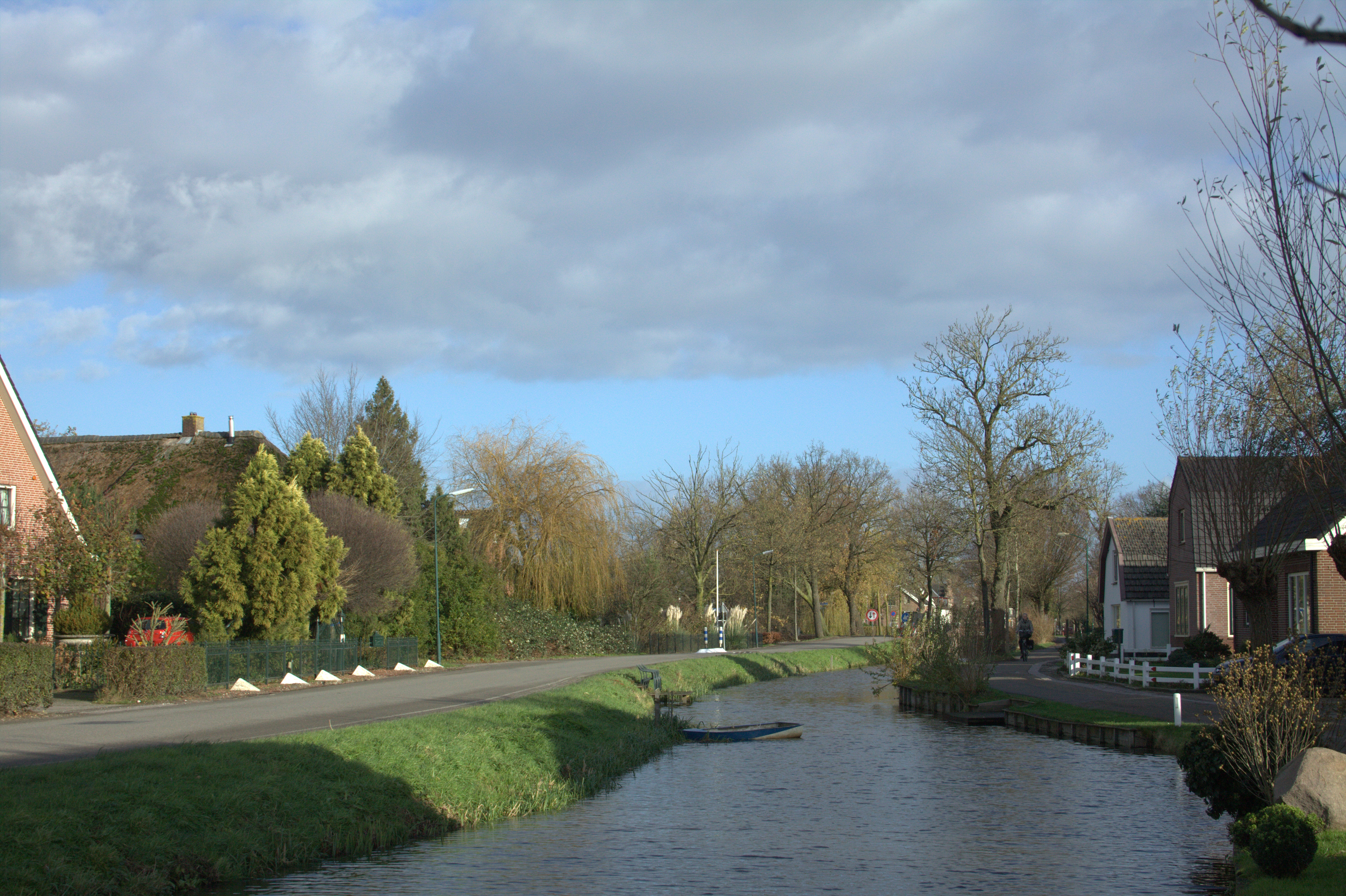
Street view

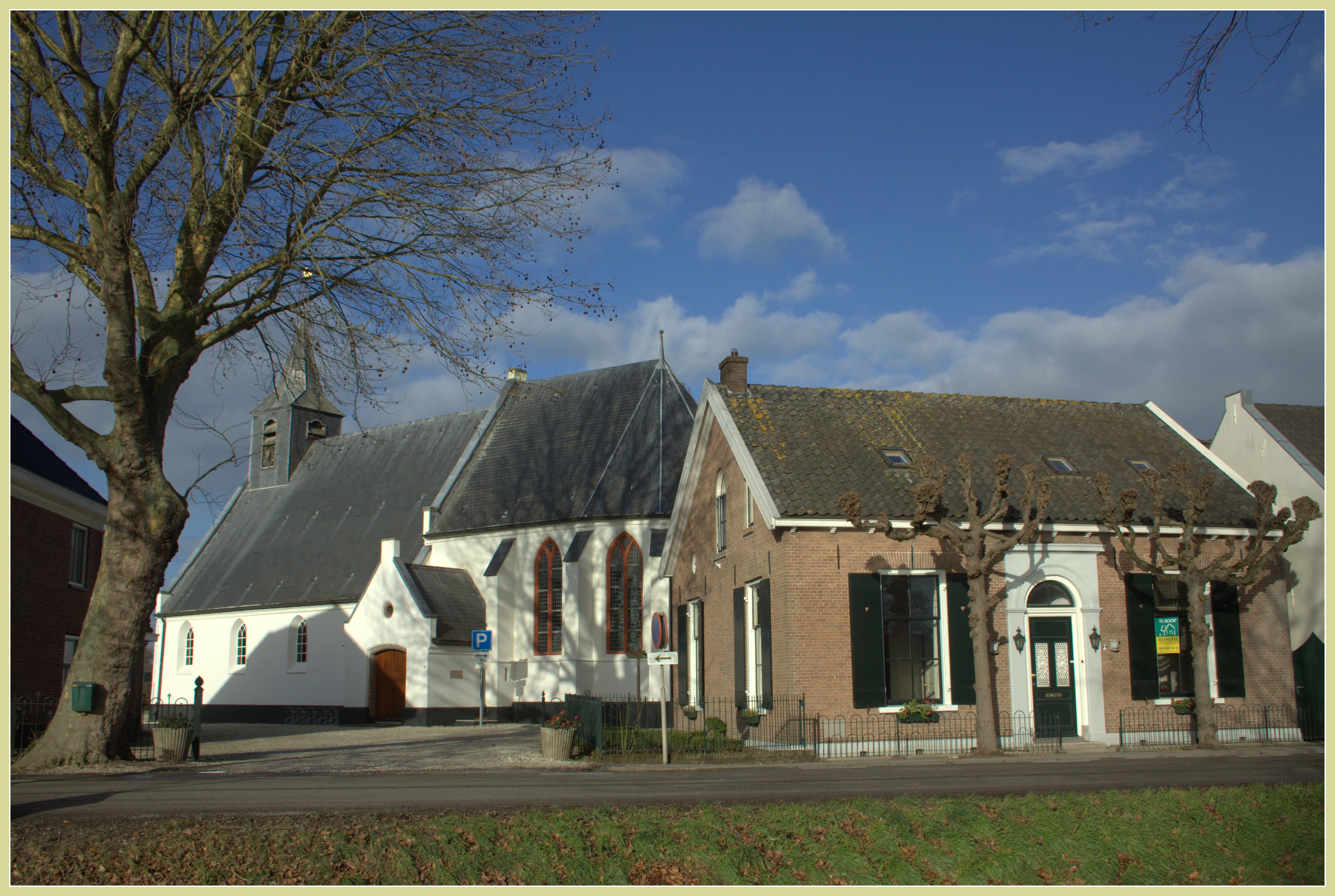
Village centre

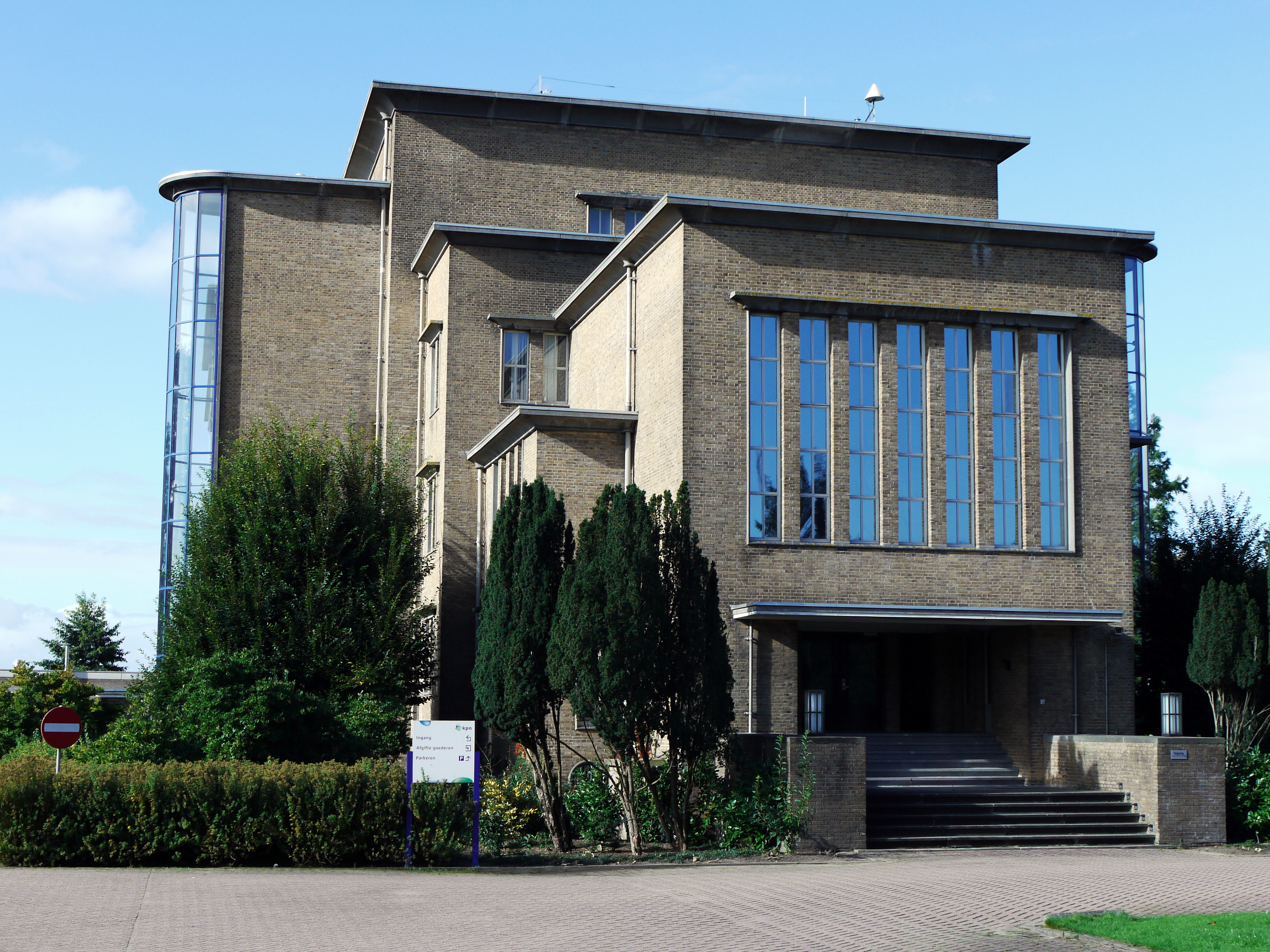
Nozema building

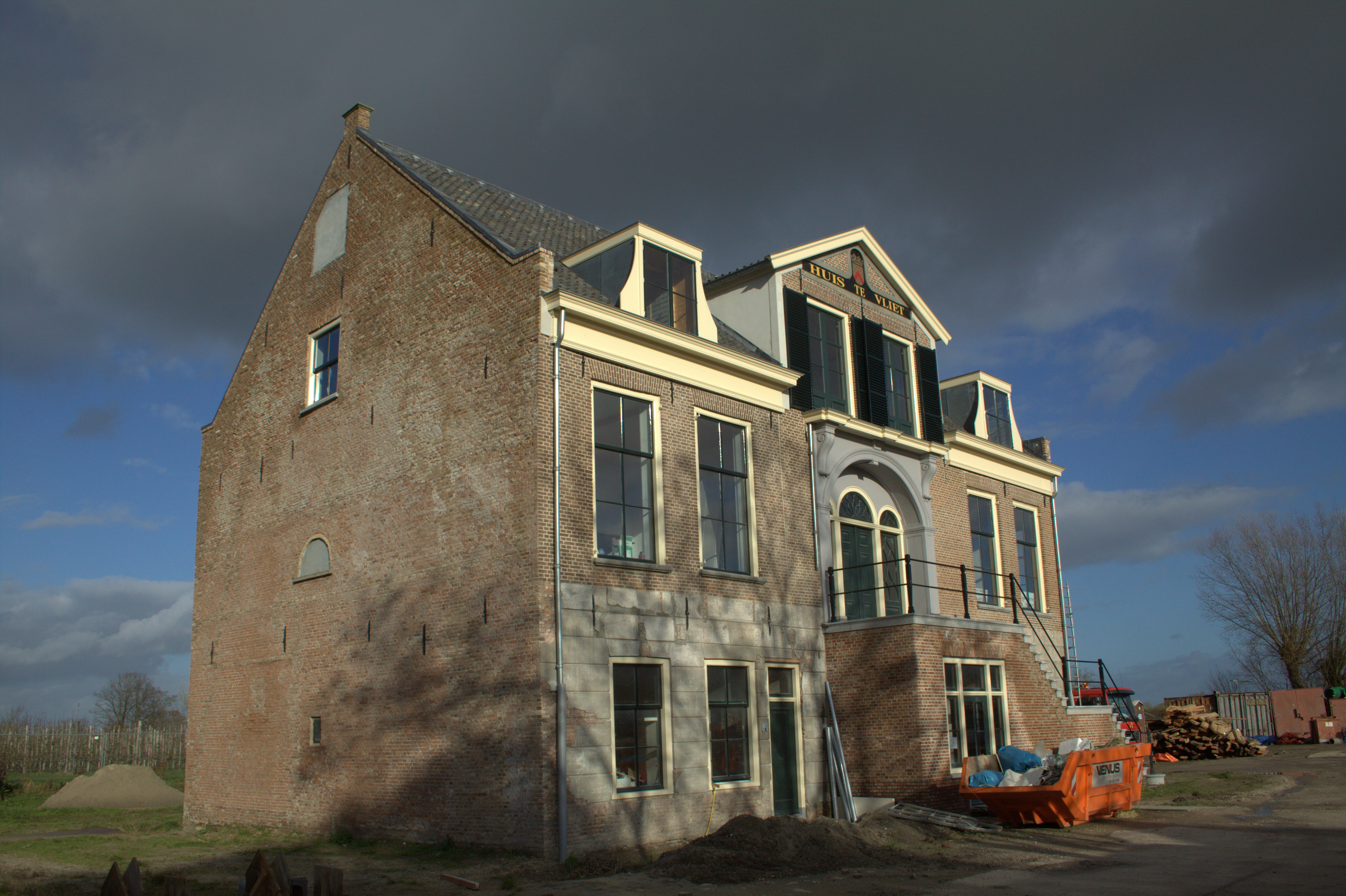
Restoration of Huis te Vliet
