= Goes TV Tower =

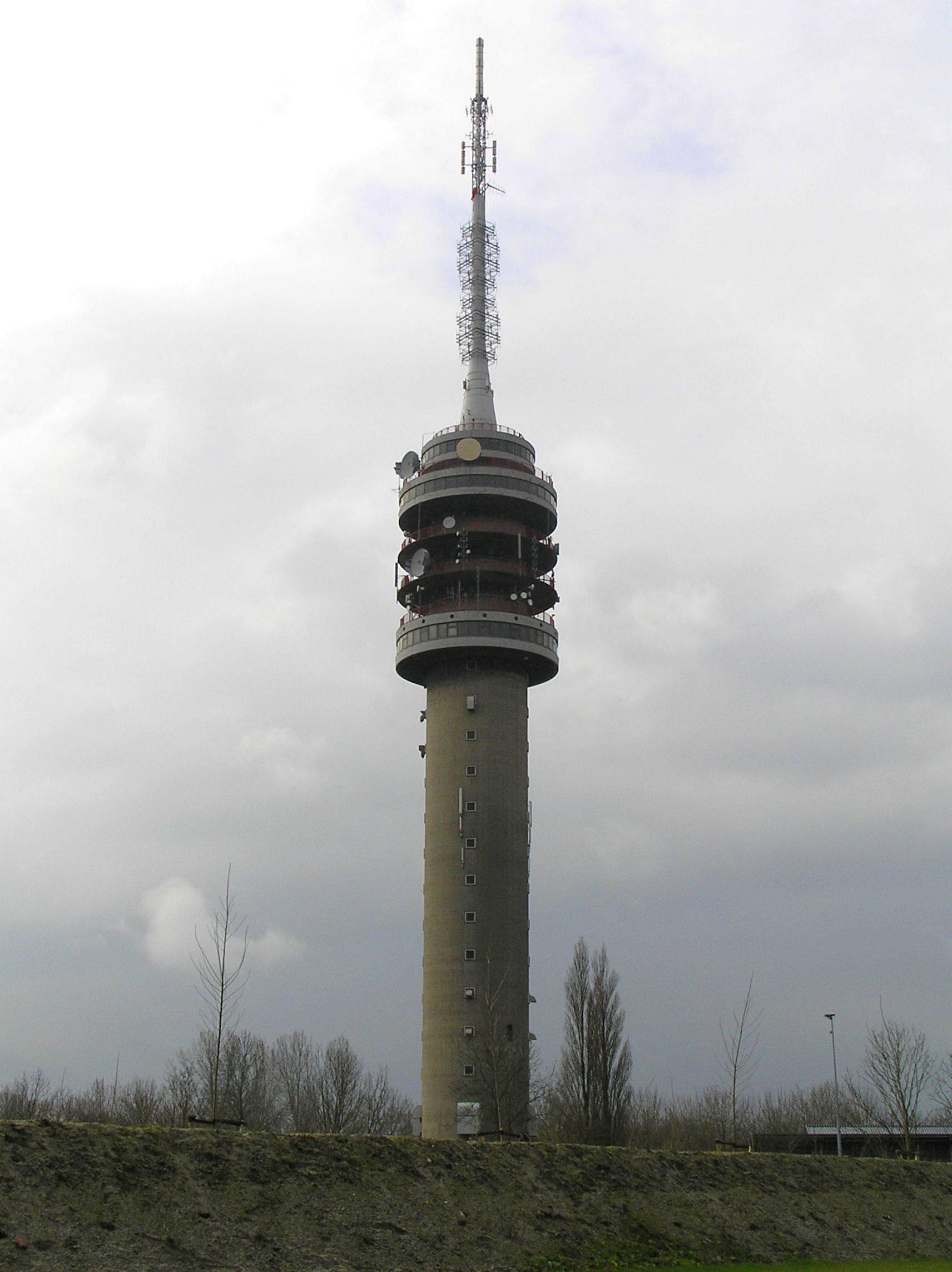
- Goes TV Tower with the new antenna
- Interactive map of the Goes TV Tower area

General information
- Type: telecommunications
- Location: Goes, Netherlands
- Coordinates: 51°30′38″N 3°53′4″E
- Construction started: 1955
- Completed: 1957

Height
- Antenna spire: 137 metres (449.5 ft) (since 2007) 153 metres (502.0 ft) (1957-2007)

The Goes TV Tower (Dutch: Televisietoren Goes) is a broadcast tower near Goes, Netherlands.

The tower was the first TV tower in the Netherlands, and is currently owned by Alticom, but the area around the tower is owned by KPN, whilst the antenna is owned by NOVEC. In 2007 a new antenna was installed, which is 11 metres (36.1 ft) shorter than the previous antenna. Together with the mast, the Goes telecommunication tower is 137 metres high. The tower is used not only for television, but also for radio and telephone. The construction of the tower in Gus was even given priority because of the possibility of using it for telephone connections. During the floods of 1953 many telephone cables were destroyed and people noticed how important it was to have other equipment for that. Construction of the tower began in 1955. A new technological process was used. Liquid concrete was poured layer by layer on the hardened concrete. The transmission tower was then placed on top of the concrete tower.

== Services ==
=== Television ===
Television signals were activated in 1957 with the single television channel available at the time. Nederland 2 was added in 1966 and Nederland 3 upon its launch in 1988. Omroep Zeeland started broadcasting using this transmitter on 1 October 1997.
