= Gerbrandy Tower =

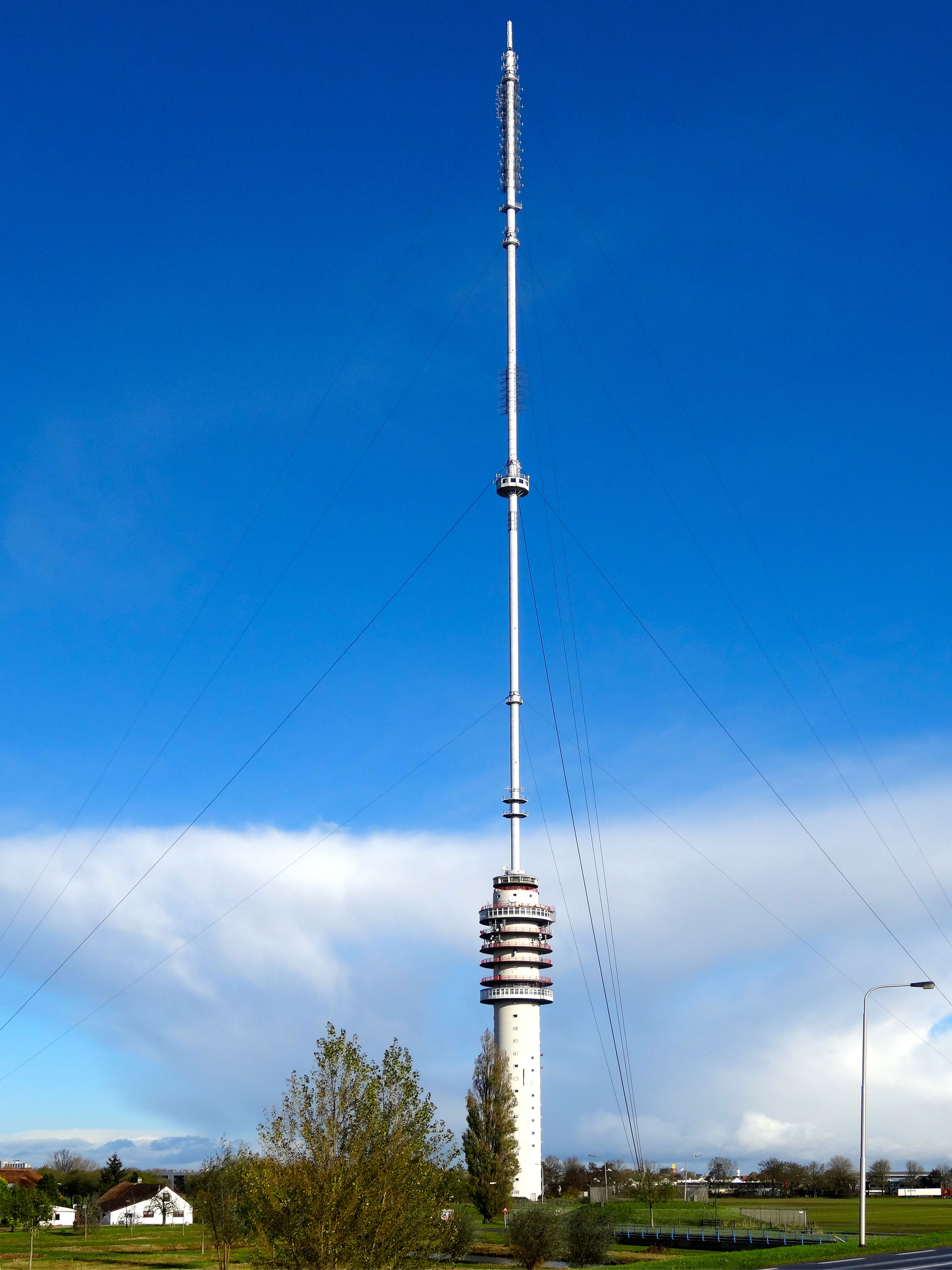
- Gerbrandy Tower
- Interactive map of the Gerbrandy Tower area

General information
- Type: Partially guyed tower
- Location: IJsselstein, Utrecht province, the Netherlands
- Coordinates: 52°0′36.24″N 5°3′12.87″E
- Completed: 1961

Height
- Height: 366.8 m (1,203.41 ft)

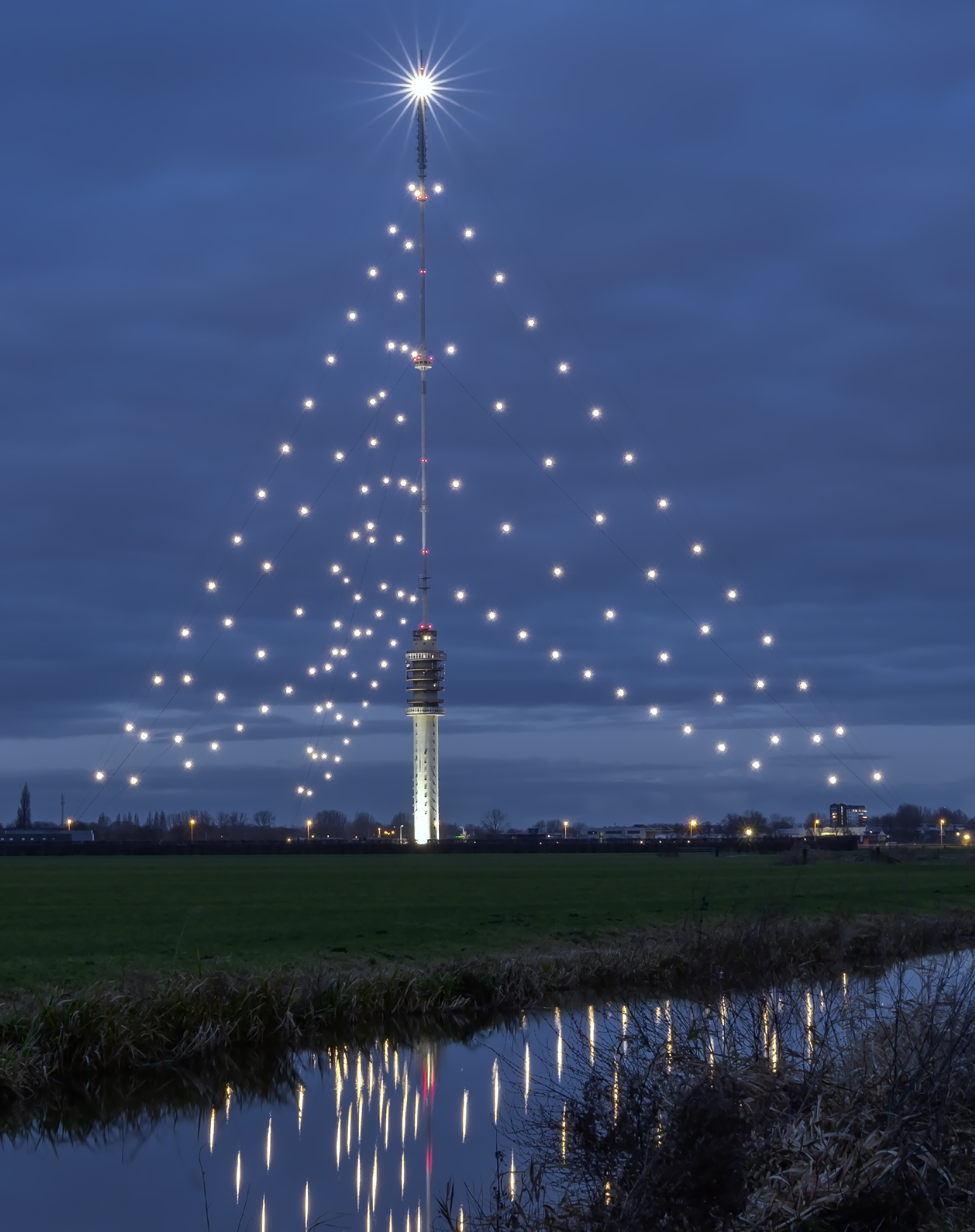
The tower as Christmas tree

The Gerbrandy Tower (Dutch: Gerbrandytoren) is a radio tower in IJsselstein, the Netherlands. It is also known as Lopik tower after the nearby town. It was built in 1961.

== Description ==
The Gerbrandy Tower is used for directional radio services and for FM- and TV-broadcasting. The Gerbrandy Tower consists of a concrete tower with a height of 100 meters (328') on which a guyed aerial mast is mounted. Its total height was originally 382.5 metres (1,255 ft), but in 1987 it was reduced to 375 metres (1,230 ft).

On August 2, 2007, its analog antenna was replaced by a digital one reducing its height by another 9 metres (30 ft). Its height is now 366.8 metres (1,203 ft).

This tower type is a partially guyed tower, which combines a lower free standing tower antennas with an upper guyed mast. If the structure is counted as a tower, it is the tallest tower in Western Europe. The Gerbrandy Tower is not the only tower which consists of a concrete tower on which a guyed mast is set. There is one similar but smaller tower with the same structure in the Netherlands, the radio tower of Zendstation Smilde, which consisted of an 80 metres (260 ft) high concrete tower, on which a 223.5 metres (733 ft) high guyed mast was mounted. This structure collapsed after a fire on July 15, 2011. Rebuilding of that tower started in late 2011 and was completed in October 2012; the replacement structure is also a partially guyed tower, now 303 metres (994 ft) high.

=== Naming ===
The tower is named after Pieter Gerbrandy, Prime Minister of the Netherlands during World War Two.

Nearby, there is another remarkable antenna: the KNMI-mast Cabauw, a mast used for meteorological measurements.

Another nearby antenna, the 196 metres (643 ft) high mediumwave transmitter Lopik, was demolished on September 4, 2015.

== Fires in Dutch TV masts ==
On July 15, 2011, there was a small fire in the Gerbrandy tower. Only hours later, a similar tower in Smilde caught fire and collapsed, after which all transmitters in the Gerbrandy tower were shut down as a precaution, leaving large parts of the Netherlands without FM-radio and digital TV (DVB-T) reception.

== Owner ==
The ownership of the tower is complex: the concrete main structure is owned by Alticom: a company established in 2007 that bought many assets from KPN. Alticom was part of the European TDG Group, but in June 2011 it was announced that all shares in Alticom were acquired by investment company Infracapital who are the infrastructure specialists of Prudential plc.

Alticom is the owner of the concrete base and the first three meters (10') of ground around this base. The metal mast on top of the structure is owned by NOVEC, which is a subsidiary of the electricity transmission operator TenneT. The ground on which the tower is built, excluding the first three meters (10') around the base, is (still) owned by KPN.

== Christmas tree ==
Every year since 1992 from 6 December till 6 January the tower is decorated with 120 LED lamps which are attached to the 12 guy-wires, so it looks like a giant Christmas tree in the dark. Furthermore bright lights at multiple sides of the mast as tree-topper and some spotlights to illuminate the lower part of the tower. In 1998 it was rewarded by The Guinness Book of Records as the tallest Christmas tree in the world in a construction. The Mount Ingino Christmas Tree is also named as the largest Christmas tree, however that is made on a hill slope.

== See also ==
- List of towers
- List of masts

== Sources ==
Records
Preceded by Eiffel Tower; 312.3 m (1,025 ft)	Tallest structure in EU; 382.5 m (1,255 ft); 1961–1973	Succeeded by Belmont transmitting station 387.5 m (1,271 ft)
