= Sendeturm Jauerling =

Radio tower in Austria

Coordinates: 48°20′23″N 15°20′17″E

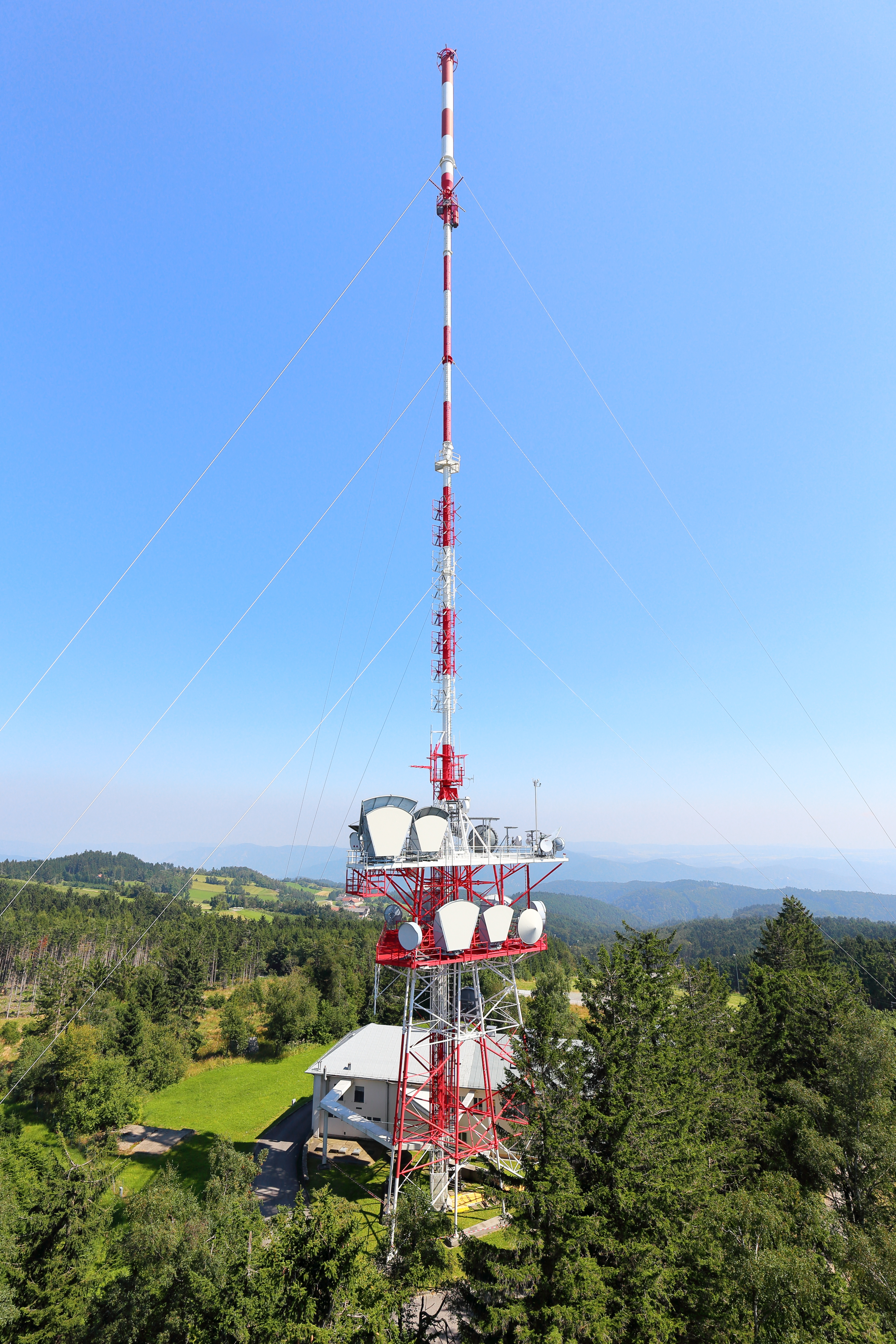
Sendeturm Jauerling

The Sendeturm Jauerling (Jauerling Transmission Tower) is a tower for directional radio services, FM and TV broadcasting on the Jauerling mountain in Austria. Sendeturm Jauerling was built in 1958. It consists of a 35-metre-high free-standing steel framework tower, which carries a guyed steel tube mast on the top and has a total height of 141 metres.

== See also ==
- List of towers
