= Mediumwave transmitter Lopik =

Radio mast in the Netherlands, 1938–2015

Coordinates: 52°00′02″N 5°02′42″E

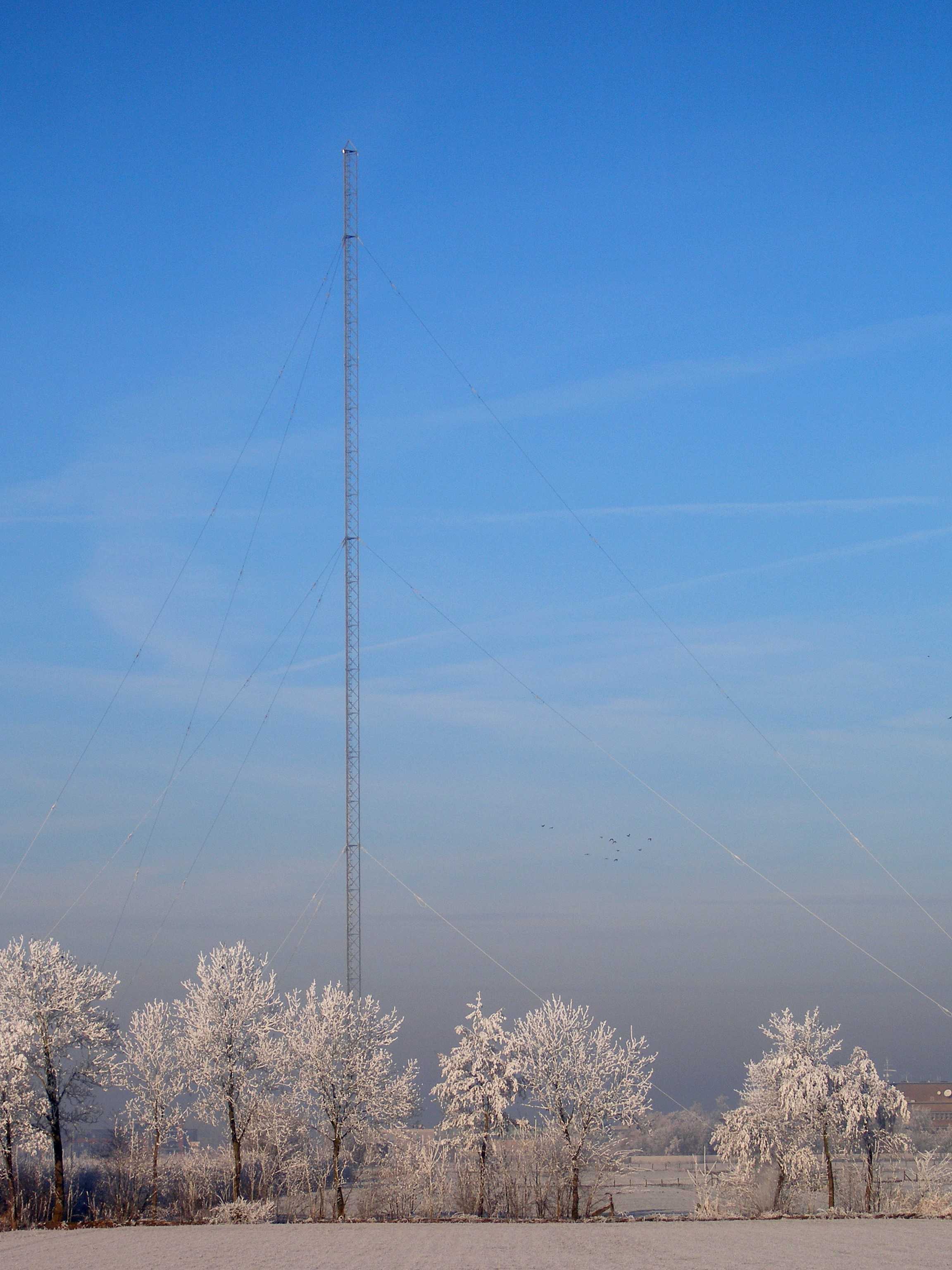
Mediumwave transmitter Lopik

The Mediumwave transmitter Lopik was a medium wave broadcasting facility near Lopik in the Netherlands. It was constructed in 1938 (87 years ago) and destroyed on September 1, 2015 (9 years ago). Its last use was to transmit the Dutch language edition of Radio Maria on 675 kHz. The aerial consisted of a 196-metre (643 ft) guyed steel framework mast, which was insulated against ground.

On 24 July 2015, Radio Maria Netherlands announced the closedown of its transmissions on 675 kHz Medium wave as of 1 September 2015.

Originally, there was also a second, 165 metres (541 ft) guyed steel framework mast for the mediumwave frequency 1332 kHz, but this was taken down on 21 August 2004.

On 4 September 2015, the remaining 196 metres (643 ft) mast was also taken down, marking the end of 75 years of Medium wave transmissions from the Lopik site.

This mast should not be confused with the Gerbrandy tower in the nearby town of IJsselstein, which is used for FM- and TV-broadcasting. The Gerbrandy Tower used to be in the municipality of Lopik as well before an administrative change, and is often referred to as the "Lopik tower".

== See also ==
List of masts
