= Guyed mast =

Tall thin vertical structure that is supported by guy lines

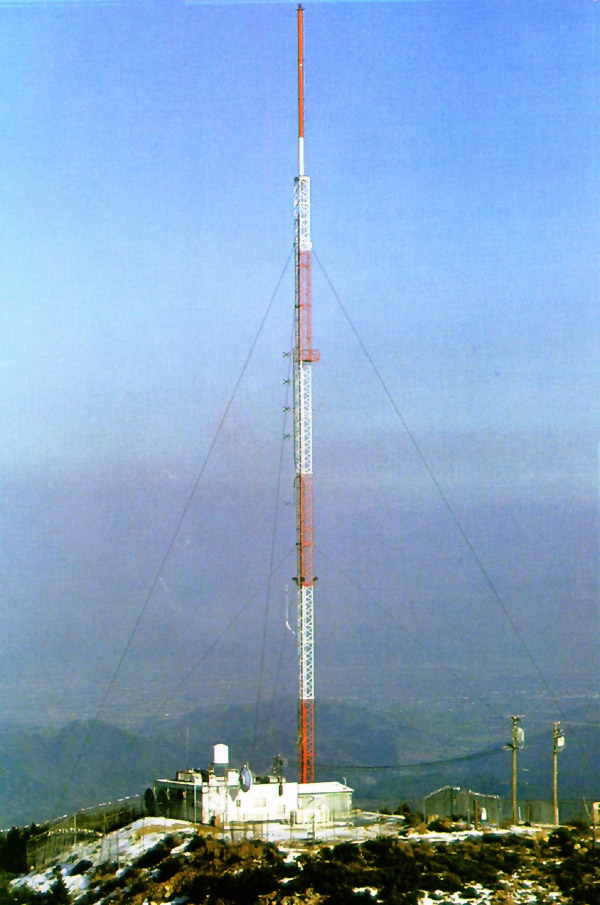
A guyed radio mast

A guyed mast is a tall thin vertical structure that depends on guy lines (diagonal tensioned cables attached to the ground or a base) for stability. The mast itself has the compressive strength to support its own weight, but does not have the shear strength to stand unsupported or bear loads. It requires guy lines to stay upright and to resist lateral (shear) forces such as wind loads. Examples include masts on sailing vessels, towers for telecommunications, meteorology, and masts on cranes, power shovels, draglines, and derricks, starting with the simple gin pole.

== Applications ==
The principal applications of guyed masts are the masts of sailing vessels, guyed towers, and as the main tower of heavy equipment such as cranes, power shovels, draglines, and derricks, the simplest of which is the gin pole.

Guyed masts are frequently used for radio masts and towers. The mast can either support radio antennas (for VHF, UHF and other microwave bands) mounted at its top, or the entire structure itself can function as a mast radiator antenna (for VLF, LF, MF). In the latter case, the mast needs to be insulated from the ground. Guyed radio masts are typically tall enough that they require between two and four sets of guy lines attached at different heights on the mast, to prevent them from buckling. An exception to multiple guys was the Blaw-Knox tower, widely used during the 1930s, whose distinctive wide diamond (rhomboidal) shape gave it the shear strength that it only required one set of guys.

Guyed masts are sometimes also used for measurement towers, to collect meteorological measurements at certain heights above ground level. Sometimes they are used as pylons (transmission towers), although their usage in agricultural areas is problematic because anchor foundations handicap ploughing. The tallest guyed tower is currently the 2,060 feet (630 m) KRDK-TV mast in Traill County, North Dakota, United States.

The mast on heavy equipment such as a crane is its main supporting tower, typically of trussed steel construction. Wire rope guys typically lead back to the crane's base stabilize it and support its ability to bear significant shear loads while lifting.

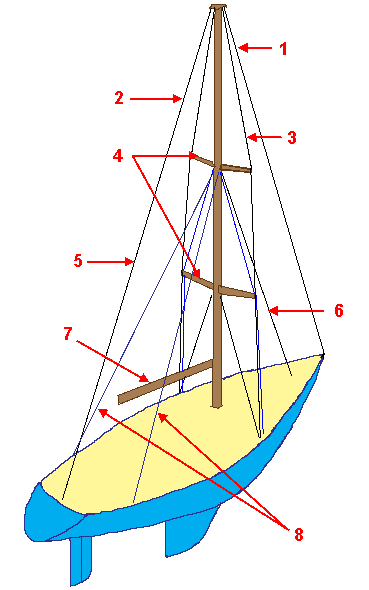
A sailboat's mast is supported by shrouds and stays - nautical equivalents of guy wires

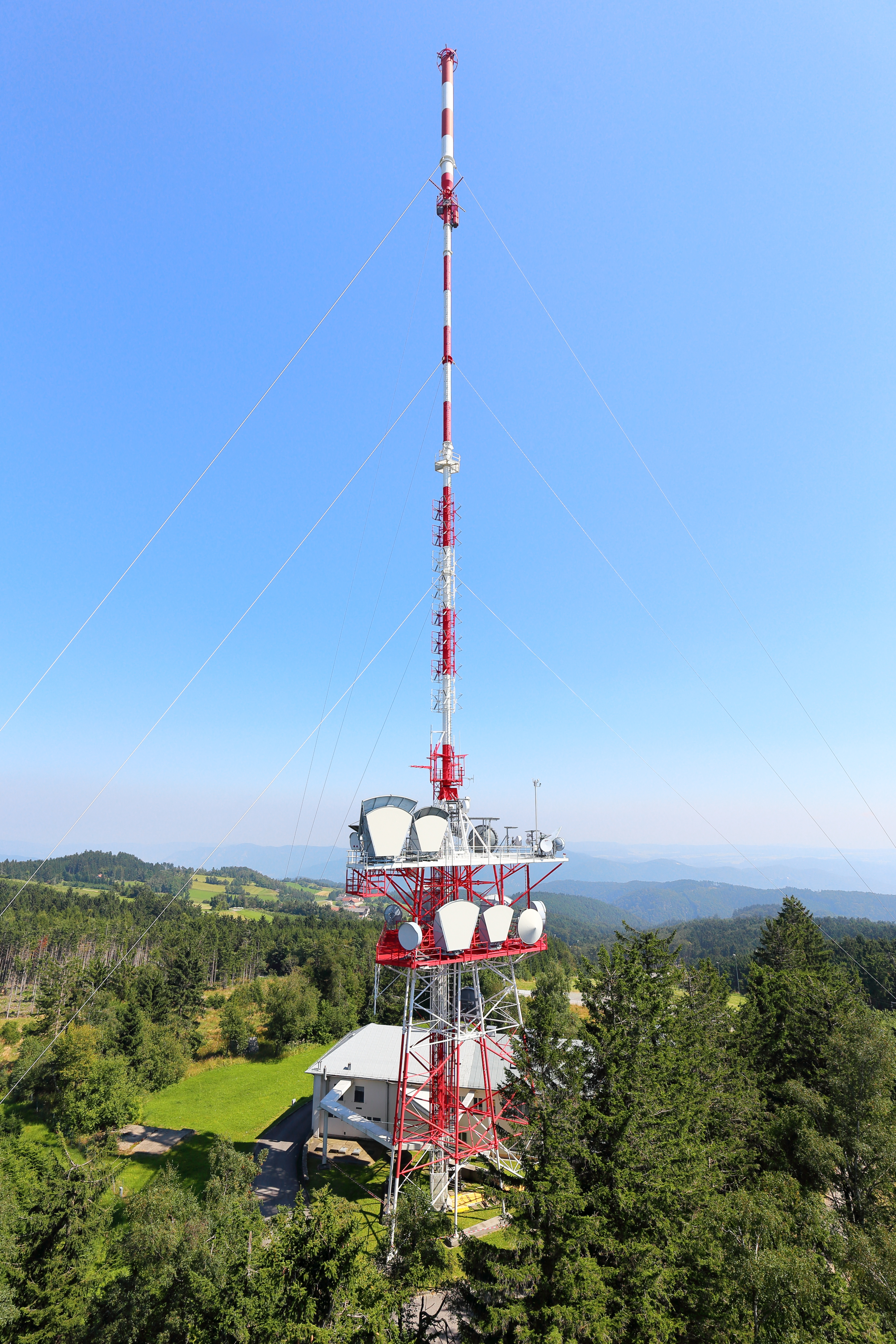
The Sendeturm Jauerling is a partially guyed 141 meter tower built in 1958, consisting of a 35-metre-high free-standing steel framework tower, which carries a 106 meter guyed steel tube mast on the top

The Trispastos ("three-pulley-crane") is a simple guyed mast form of crane that dates to Greco-Roman times

== Partially guyed tower ==
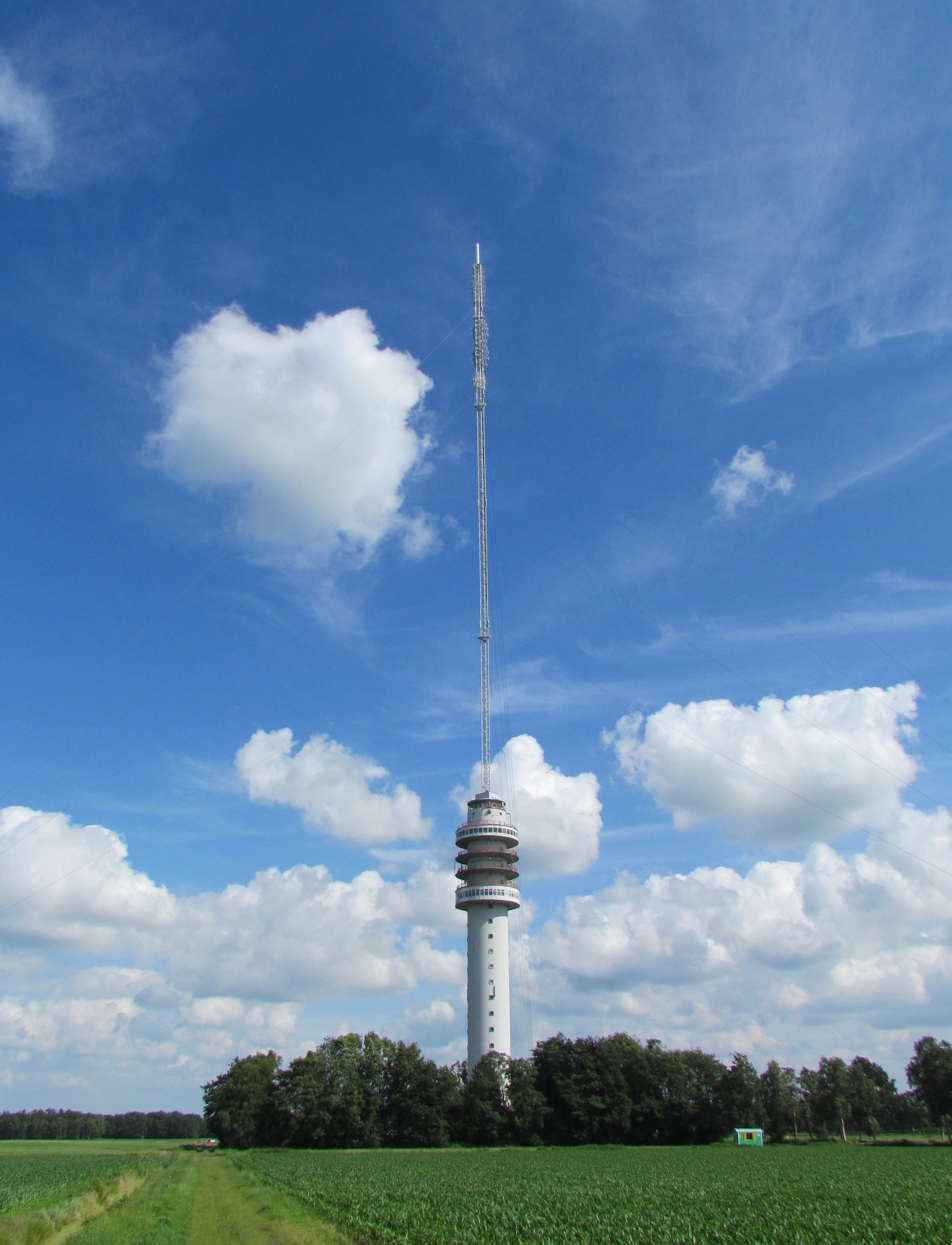
Zendstation Smilde, Netherlands, is a 303 m (994 ft) partially guyed tower that consists of an 80 m (260 ft) high reinforced concrete tower topped since 2012 by a 223 m (732 ft) steel lattice television mast

A partially guyed tower is a tower structure which consists of a free-standing base, in most cases of concrete or of lattice steel, with a guyed mast on the top. The anchor base of the guyed mast can be on the top of the tower or on the ground.

=== Use ===
Partially guyed towers are typically used when a very high tower for FM and TV transmission is required, while also carrying antennas for directional radio services at a much lower height. In such cases the antennas for directional radio services are mounted on the top of the free-standing part of the tower, while the guyed mast on its top carry the FM and TV antennas. They can be also used in order to upgrade small stable towers (like watertowers) with a long antenna mast for FM and TV broadcasting. However their use is rare, and they exist chiefly in certain European countries.

Note that mast radiators which stand atop an antenna tuning hut (a.k.a. helix building) are not considered partially guyed towers, because the hut is much smaller than the mast radiator. Such constructions include the Mühlacker radio transmitter and the Ismaning radio transmitter.

=== Anchor placements ===
Partially guyed towers can be divided into two types, depending on the placement of the guy anchors.

==== Atop the free-standing tower ====
Guyed masts on skyscrapers or wider towers are often guyed on the roof of the free-standing basement structure. In such cases, there is no major constructive difference of the guyed mast to a guyed mast on plain ground, and the construction of the free-standing basement tower does not differ much from a tower of the same height without a mast. The guyed mast of such constructions is usually of lesser height than basement tower.

==== On the ground ====
Partially guyed towers in which at least one basement of the guy anchors is on the ground are more rare. The placement of guy basements across a broader geometric base allows for a mast much taller than the free-standing basement tower, and the integration of tower and mast should be considered in all facets of construction and maintenance.

== Gallery ==
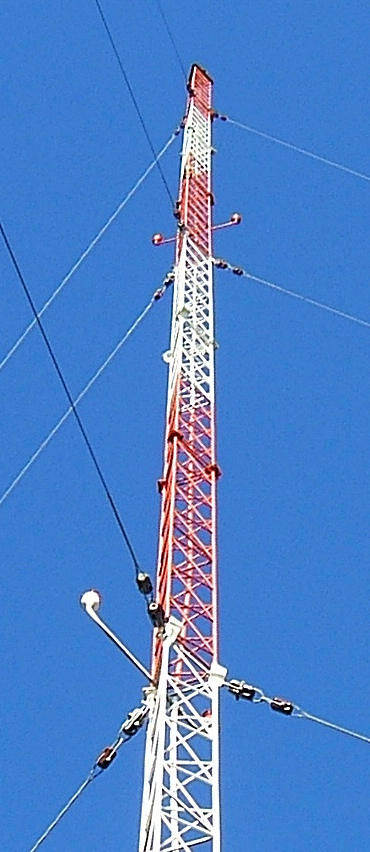
200 foot (61 m) radio mast of an AM radio station in Mount Vernon, Washington, US supported by three sets of 120° guy lines

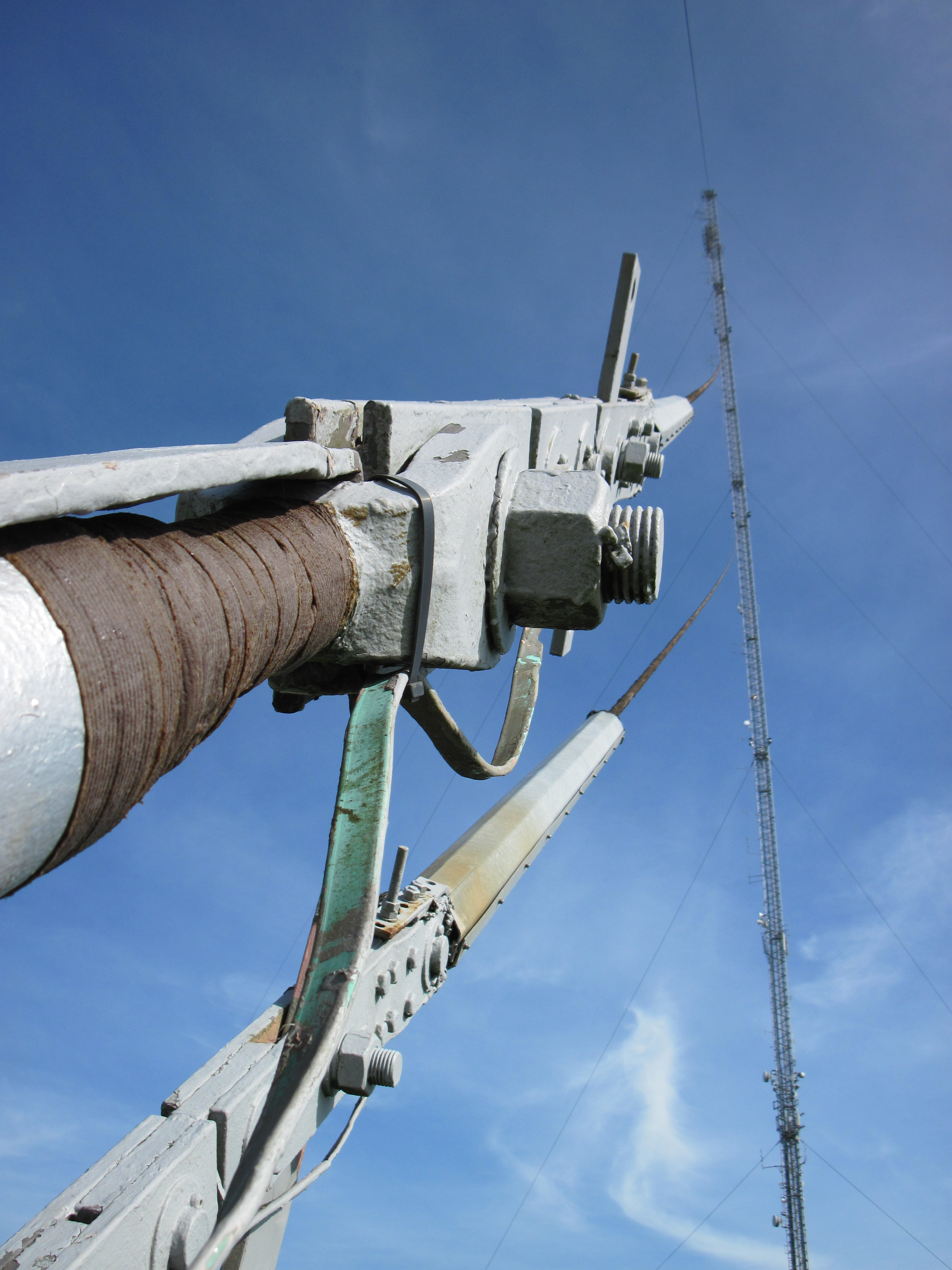
Mast guy line

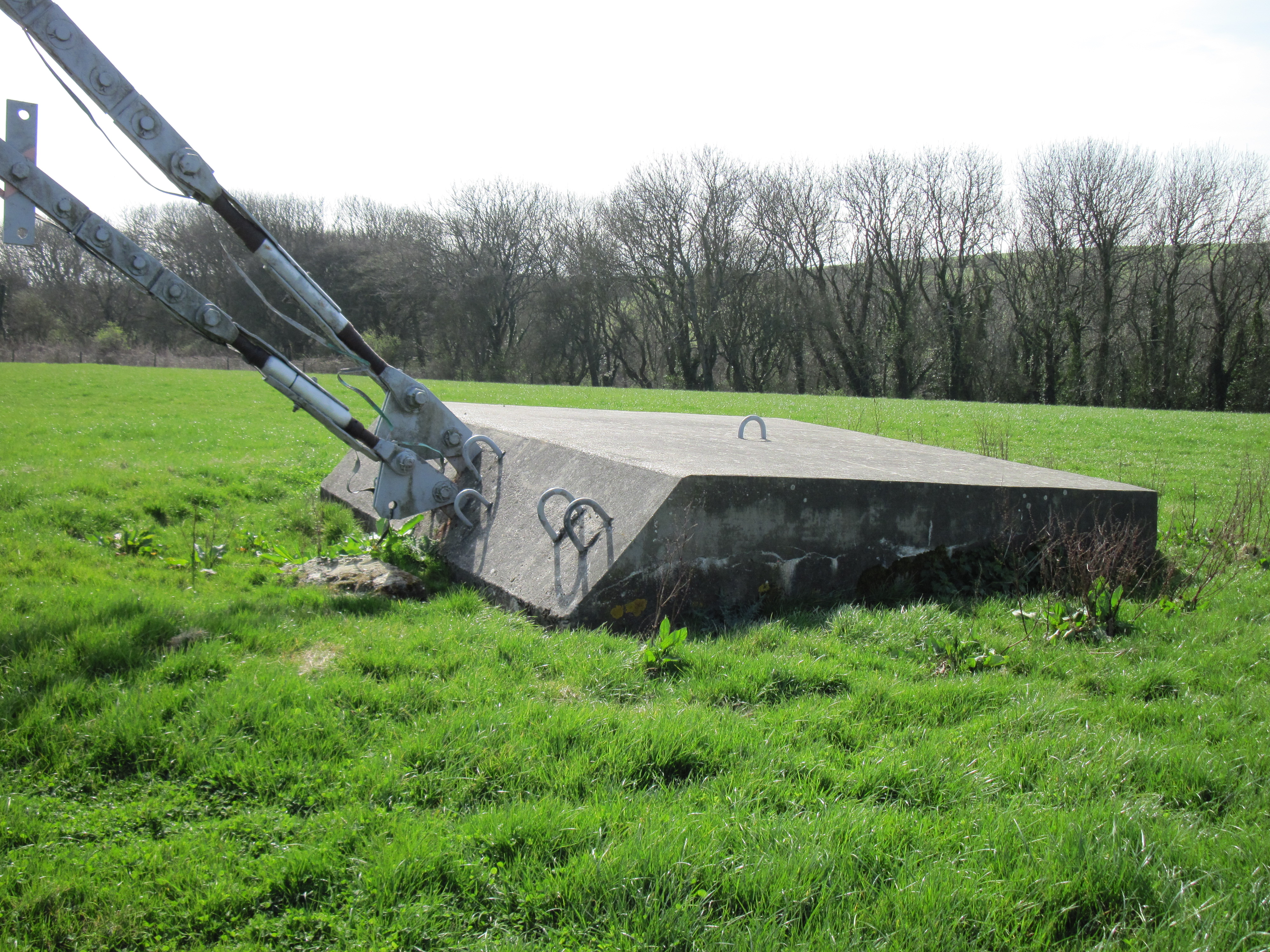
Guyed mast guy line anchor

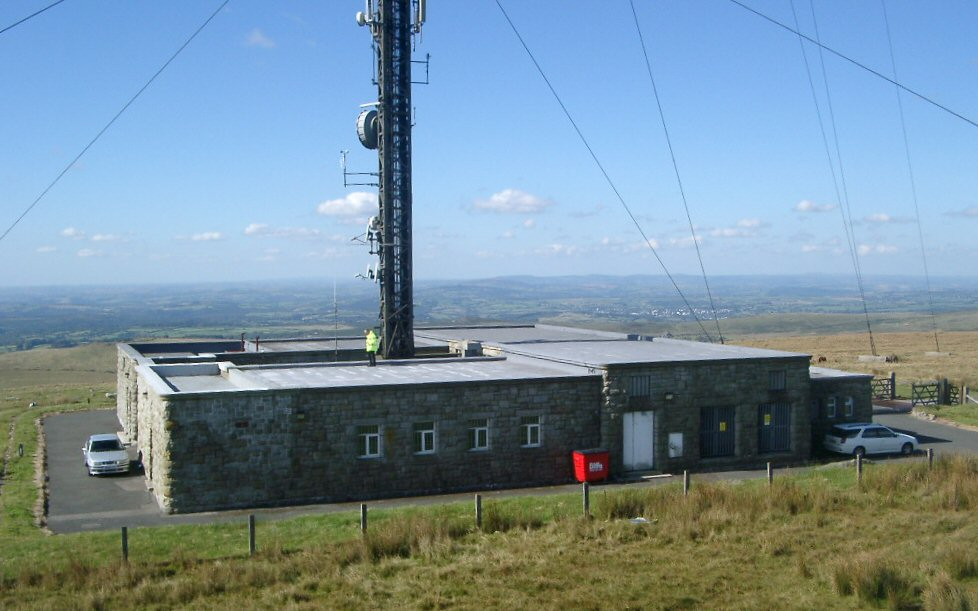
Guyed mast transmitter building

A guyed FM and TV radio mast in Christmas, Florida, US. It is 1,695 feet (517 m) tall.

== See also ==
- List of masts for examples of guyed mast structures.
