= Alticom =

- Company type: telecommunication infrastructure
- Industry: telecommunication services
- Founded: 2007
- Founder: TDF Group
- Headquarters: Meppel, Netherlands
- Area served: Netherlands
- Key people: Ed Clarke, director Infracapital
- Products: transmission masts Data centre services
- Owner: Cellnex
- Parent: Cellnex (since 2017)
- Website: www.alticom.nl
- Footnotes / references In June 2011 Infracapital acquired Alticom from TDG Holding. In 2017 Cellnex acquired Alticom from Infracapital..

Alticom bv is a Dutch company that owns 30 transmission masts in the Netherlands. It operates as a market leading core communications infrastructure provider in the Netherlands. Alticom offers space on these masts for antennas as well as transmission equipment to operators of telecommunication networks and room within the constructions for the associated equipment and as colocation/data center/backhaul/connectivity.

== Masts and towers ==
Alticom owns 30 masts and towers all over the Netherlands. Its primary activity consists on colocation services for all telecommunication and content delivery networks in the Netherlands. It can offer full coverage of the country

Alticom owns the concrete base of the large towers such as the Gerbrandy Tower and Zendstation Smilde while the steel mast on top of these towers is owned by a company named NOVEC, which is a subsidiary of TenneT. The ground on which these towers are built are owned by KPN, the company that sold the towers and masts to Alticom and Novec in 2007. Only the first 3 meters around the base of these structures are owned by Alticom.

== Datacenters ==
Since 2009 space in the towers is offered as colocation centers. Offering includes: housing of servers infrastructure, energy provisioning, emergency power, connectivity, etc. The company offers these spaces as data centers and offers this to IT companies as regional data center facilities. All facilities are on-site to guarantee permanent operation (such as emergency power-generators, redundant communication links etc.).

Data and colocation centers such as those offered by the company are bound to play a key role in addressing latency, which will become a critical issue for the next 5G deployment. 5G pushes for a network change. Processing and storage capacity will be located as close as possible to the user through data centers for edge computing. That means moving broadband content delivery, streaming video, etc. closer to the edge of the network. There will be edge data centers and connected to the latter micro data centers.

== Fires ==
On 15 July 2011 a large fire in the Smilde tower broke out within the steel mast on top of Alticom's concrete base. The extreme heat that was produced by this fire resulted in the collapse of the steel tower and the steel construction was destroyed. All transmissions from the tower, including the FM radio signal of RTV Drenthe, which is assigned as the official emergency station in case of emergencies, have since been stopped. Via two temporary masts in Assen and Smilde transmission of this station as well as most public and commercial programmes are restored.

On the same day a smaller fire in the highest tower of Alticom, the Gerbrandy Tower, interrupted transmission of TV- and radio in a large part of the Netherlands. There is no indication that these fires are related.

== Infracapital ==
On 8 June 2011 a joint press-release from Infracapital and the TDF Group was published. The press-release informed the public that investment company Infracapital has acquired 100% of the shares in Alticom from TDF Group.

Infracapital is the investment company specialized in investments in infrastructure related companies. It is managed by M&G Investment limited which is the asset management arm of Prudential plc. Some other companies Infracapital invests in are Red Funnel, Associated British Ports, Kelda Group Pressrelease Infracapital acquires 100% of Alticom Archived 2011-07-24 at the Wayback Machine, 8 June 2011, retrieved 27 July 2011.
