= Althio =

Althio B.V.
- Type: Besloten Vennootschap
- Industry: Telecommunications
- Predecessor: NOZEMA
- Founded: 2005
- Headquarters: Vianen
- Area served: Netherlands
- Owner: TenneT
- Website: www.althio.nl

Althio B.V., formerly Nederlandse Opstelpunten voor Ethercommunicatie (NOVEC), is the largest operator of antenna towers for radio-communication in the Netherlands.

== The company ==
Novec was established in 2005 when the operator NOZEMA was split up. NOZEMA was the operator for all National radio and television broadcasting activities in the Netherlands. The company was split into a private operator of radio-transmitters (Nozema Services) and a public operator managing the actual masts for the antenna's used by those radio-transmitters. Nozema Services offers services that can be used by broadcasters to actually transmit their radio or TV signals, but since 2005 also operators can offer these services.

Althio is state owned and a Besloten Vennootschap (BV), with all shared owned by TenneT.

== The masts ==
Novec offers nearly 1500 "high altitude" locations for radio-signal antennas. They do this by offering space and/or services in their fully owned masts (>200) and masts they own together with other companies. They also offer space in the pylons owned by mother-company TenneT, but due to the relevant low height of these kind of locations these spaces are mainly used by Mobile network operators. Other transmission locations, e.g. for regional radio or TV stations and mobile telephony, are on top of generic large buildings like factories or flats. The highest locations offered by Novec are available in the Radio and TV-masts like the Gerbrandy Tower or Zendstation Smilde. These locations have very complex ownership-structures: the concrete base of the tower (and the space within that tower) is owned and operated by the private company Alticom, the steel mast on top of these towers are owned and operated by Novec while the ground on which the mast stands (except for the first 3 metres around the base; which is owned by Alticom) is owned by KPN.

== Services ==
Apart from offering locations for radio/TV transmission antenna's and locations for GSM networks the company also offers other services. They provide advisory and training services on the subject of Electromagnetic compatibility and they also offer EMC measurements. They also offer a video-trolley to check Guy-wires of high masts: they use this trolley to check these guy-wires of their own masts, but also rent out the equipment to other mast-owners

But their main activity is the management and offering of locations for antenna's. This is split into 'high' locations for (digital or analog) radio and TV broadcasting and 'low' locations for mobile communications. They also have some locations for AM broadcasting.

=== Fixed prices for broadcasting facilities ===
For their public role of offering locations for broadcasting they have fixed prices that are the same for every operator. Mast/location rental for mobile networks are not fixed.

For space in masts they have two different prices (per 2012): space on an AM antenna and 'other' broadcasting masts. The price for AM antenna's is € 204,77 per meter mast - but you have to rent the whole antenna - not available for shared use. And the price for 'other' antenna's is € 3.095,88 per meter (but there you only pay for the actual used/hired meters). For additional equipment (like the transmitters itself) you can hire space inside the buildings or masts or you can rent space on the grounds around the mast. These prices are based on the actual costs (including all overhead): it is not the intention to make a profit on these services as they are seen as 'essential services'

=== Other services ===
Mast locations for non-broadcasting facilities are a commercial part of the company. Beside space in the broadcasting masts (on lower heights) they also offer space in the pylons of mother-company TenneT for the antenna's for mobile telephony and supporting infrastructure such as point-to-point transceivers. They offer 'empty' mast-space on any of their masts or TenneT pylons and they also manage over 500 installations that were used by the operators Telfort and Orange.

== Trivia ==
The highest mast in the Netherlands is (partially) owned by Novec: the Gerbrandy Tower, which is also known as the largest christmas tree in the world as around the Christmas period christmas lights are placed in the Guy-wires of this tower

On 15 July 2011, fires broke out in the Novec masts Gerbrandy Tower and the tower of Zendstation Smilde. The fire in the Gerbrandy Tower only resulted in minimal damage, while the steel mast on top of the concrete base in Smilde collapsed (and it is the steel mast that is owned by Novec). The fires were unrelated. For details see the respective articles on these towers.
