= Zendstation Smilde =

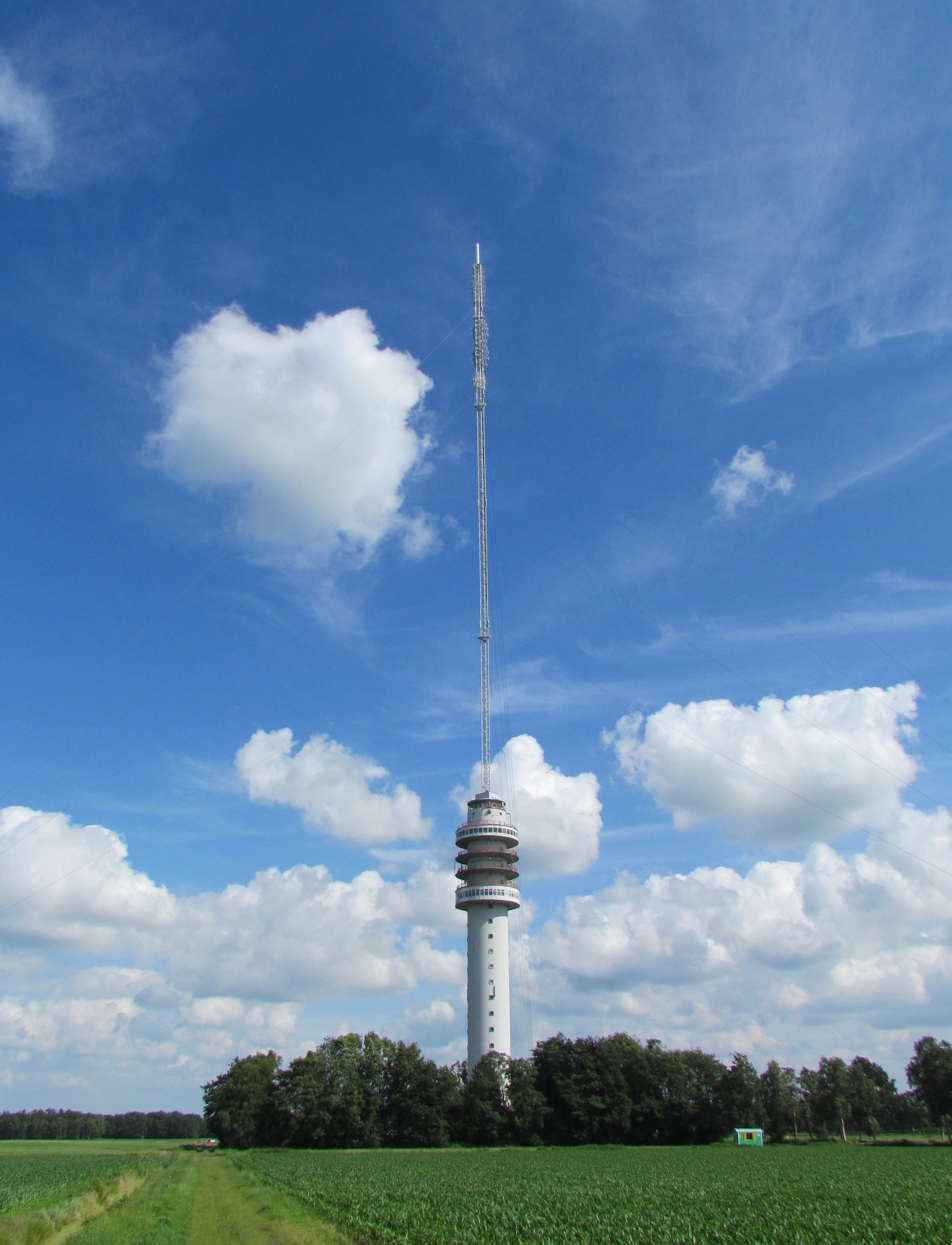
- Zendstation Smilde in 2014
- Interactive map of the Zendstation Smilde area

General information
- Status: Partly destroyed—rebuilt
- Type: Partially guyed tower
- Location: Smilde, Netherlands
- Coordinates: 52°54′9.8″N 6°24′12.23″E
- Completed: 1959 / 2012
- Destroyed: 15 July 2011

Height
- Height: 303 m (994.09 ft) (current height)

Zendstation Smilde, also known as the CJ2 Data tower (Dutch: CJ2 Datatoren) is a 303 m (994 ft) partially guyed tower in Hoogersmilde, Netherlands. Built in 1959 for directional radio services and TV and FM-transmissions, it consists of an 80 m (260 ft) high reinforced concrete tower topped since 2012 by a 223 m (732 ft) television mast. It originally had a tubular 190 m (620 ft) analog TV - UHF antenna for a mast, removed in September 2007 and replaced by a similar 214 m (702 ft) UHF antenna for DVB-T, raising the tower's height to 294 m (965 ft). Destroyed by a fire on 15 July 2011, that mast was removed, and replaced in 2012 with the current steel lattice one.

The tower is similar in configuration to the Gerbrandy Tower (IJsselstein).

== Owner ==
Originally the mast was built by the state company for Post and Telephony (Koninklijke KPN N.V.) but due to privatisation this has changed. Several masts in The Netherlands, including above mentioned Gerbrandy Tower, have a complex ownership structure:

- The 82 metres (269 ft) high concrete tower is owned by Alticom BV
- The steel mast on top of the concrete tower is owned by NOVEC BV, a 100% daughter of TenneT BV, which is itself 100% state-owned
- The grounds on which the mast is located is owned by KPN, except for a ring of 3 metres (9.8 ft) around the base of the tower which is owned by Alticom.

== Aircraft incident ==
On 14 August 1968 a US Air Force plane, an F-100 Super Sabre, from the Lakenheath Air Force Base in England was involved in an accident in heavy low clouds where the tip of a wing hit and broke one of the guy-wires of the tower, causing the upper section of the tower to bend. The pilot made an emergency landing at Soesterberg Royal Netherlands Air Force Base with considerable damage to the right wing.

== Fire and collapse ==
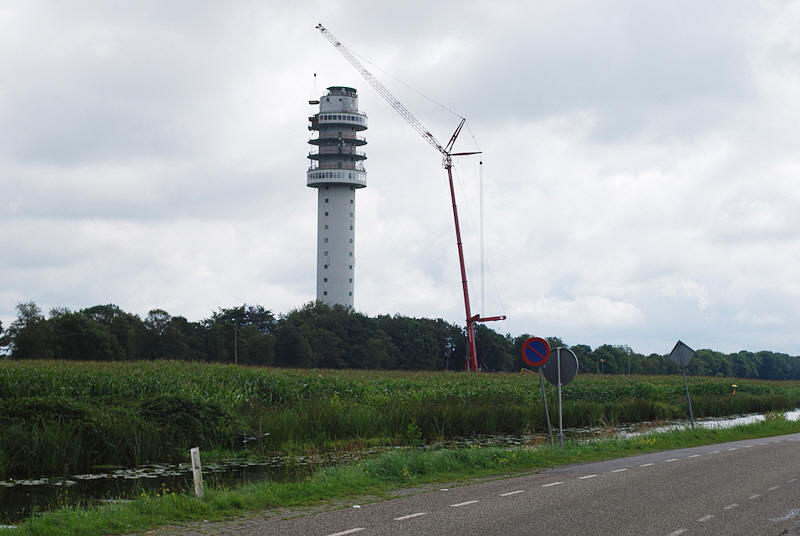
The tower after the collapse of its mast

On 15 July 2011, the antenna section caught fire and collapsed, leaving only the concrete base standing.

In the above-mentioned report a warning was given that there was an increased risk of accidents in the masts, mainly because of the complex ownership structure, which left safety processes unclear. An investigation by the Dutch police failed to show any criminal negligence or other contributing factors that could have caused the fire.

=== Rebuilding the mast ===
The fire destroyed the steel mast on top of the concrete tower completely and the top of the concrete tower was damaged. The owner of the steel mast, NOVEC BV, announced that starting in March 2012 erection of the new mast on top of the concrete tower would begin, which would be operational by the summer of 2012. The new steel lattice mast is a few metres (yards) higher than the previous tubular one, bringing the mast to the same height as before 2006. This will prevent the 'chimney effect' in a fire, increasing safety. On 14 May 2012, at 10:35 the highest point was reached by the builders of VolkerWessels The mast was fully operational again in October 2012.

== See also ==
- List of towers
- List of masts
