= Targeting tower =

Targeting towers use a special device to ensure an antenna's stability when strong wind blows.

This system is based on the geometrical properties of the parallelogram. Three vertical rods are used to maintain the top platform horizontal when the tower bends under the wind effect. The top platform is pin connected to the mast, thanks to a special mechanical link based on universal joint system. The system allows to reduce the size and the weight of the towers, because contrary to standard poles, stiffness is not needed.

In standard towers, the antenna beam's rotation must not exceed a certain angle (currently between 0.5° and 2°), otherwise the communication is cut. This design criterion is more severe than the resistance criteria and leads to use twice the steel quantity.

Targeting towers have been used for the first time in 2004 in Italy for high radar supporting poles.

Specific tests have been led on a tower-test platform in Livorno (Italy). The test used 2 cameras filming simultaneously a target meanwhile the pole was submitted to dynamic oscillations. One being fixed on the pole and the other on the top platform.
