= List of additionally guyed towers =

This is a list of additionally guyed towers.

Tower	Year	Country	Town	Pinnacle height	Remarks
Torre de Collserola	1992	Spain	Barcelona	288.4 m	
Torre Espacial	1980	Argentina	Buenos Aires	228 m	
Mervento Wind Turbine		Finland	Vaasa	184 m	
Kaesong Broadcasting Tower		North Korea	Kaesong	170.7 m	
Large Flarestick of Port Maghera refinery		Italy	Port Maghera	166 m	
RKS Liblice 1		Czech Republic	Český Brod	150 m	Insulated against ground
Kherson TV Mast		Ukraine	Kherson	142 m	
Mount Ślęża transmitter	1972	Poland	Mount Ślęża	136 m	
Portofino TV Tower		Italy	Portofino	130 m	
Leżajsk TV Tower		Poland	Lezarsk	130 m	
Receiver Tower of Tabernas solar energy research centre		Spain	Tabernas		
Rarău transmitter		Romania	Câmpulung Moldovenesc		
Borsec - Teasc transmitter		Romania	Borscec		
Sovata transmitter		Romania	Sovata		
Psunj TV Tower	1963	Croatia	Psunj	128.5 m	Originally completely free-standing
Helgoland Radio Tower	2000	Germany	Helgoland	115 m	
Agenskalns Television Tower	1954	Latvia	Riga	110 m	
Eitanim transmitter, large tower		Israel	Jerusalem	110 m	commons:File:Eitanim1.jpg
Nha Trang Radio Tower		Vietnam	Nha Trang		Media:Nha Trang Rooftop Panorama.jpg
Schöckl Transmitter	1957	Austria	Schöckl	100 m	
Holstein Tower	1988	Germany	Sierksdorf	100 m	Gyro-Tower in Hansa Park
Păltiniş transmitter		Romania	Vârful Onceşti	100 m	
Staszyce Radio Tower		Poland	Piła	98 m	
KFJZ-Tower		United States	Everman, Texas	86.6 m	Additionally guyed tower radiator
Krinichki Communications Tower		Ukraine	Krinichki	75 m	
Eitanim TV Tower		Israel	Jerusalem		
USDA-ARS Conservation and Production Research Laboratory Meteorological Tower		United States	Bushland, Texas		media:USDA windmills.jpg
Rubtsovsk Radio Tower	1957	Russia	Rubtsovsk	72 m	Dismantled in 1966
Pohorje transmitter		Slovenia	Maribor	72 m	
TON Błeszno Częstochowa		Poland	Częstochowa	71 m	TON Błeszno Częstochowa
Ostrowiec Świętokrzyski Water Tower		Poland	Ostrowiec Świętokrzyski	70 m	
South Wellfleet Marconi Towers	1902	United States	Cape Cod	64 m	4 wooden towers, dismantled in 1920
Askiz TV Tower		Russia	Askiz		
Kaliningrad Transmission Mast		Russia	Kaliningrad		
1 Tower of Monte Beigua transmitter		Italy	Monte Beigua, Savona		
Large tower of Monte Secchieta transmitter		Italy	Monte Secchieta, Toscana		commons:File:Ripetitori_sul_Monte_Secchieta.jpg
Las Palmas Radio Towers		Spain	Las Palmas		2 towers
Mount Washington TV Mast		United States	Mount Washington, New Hampshire		
Bytów MPEC Chimney		Poland	Bytów	61 m	
Greenway CSP Solar Tower	2013	Turkey	Mersin	60 m	
Bratiya radio tower		Bulgaria	Bratiya Mountain, Panagyurski kolonii		
Kmur transmitter		Bosnia-Hercogowina	Kmur		
One tower of Monte Pellegrino Transmitter		Italy	Palermo		
One tower of Monte Faro de Domaio Transmitter		Spain	Moaña		
RR Braga Transmission Tower		Portugal	Braga		
Santo António das Neves Radio Tower		Portugal	Santo António das Neves		
First Drilling Tower of Kola Superdeep Borehole	1970	Russia	Sapoljarny		Файл:Kolsk_Sverh_Glub_01.jpg
Coimbra Radio Tower		Portugal	Coimbra		
Góra Baraniec Transmitter, Tower 1		Poland	Jelenia Góra		
Kospec Chimney		Poland	Kościerzyna	57 m	
Alert Bay Totem Pole		Canada	Alert Bay, British Columbia	52.7 m	World's tallest totem pole
Varna TV Tower		Bulgaria	Varna	52 m	
Artsakh Cross	2017	Azerbaijan	Dashushen	50 m	
Nanos transmitter, Main Tower	1962	Slovenia	Vipava	50 m	
Dervishka mogila radio tower		Bulgaria	Dervishka mogila	49 m	
NTL Amelin		Poland	Amelin	49 m	
Góra Przybędza Radio Tower		Poland	Węgierska Górka	45 m	
MDD Furniture Factory Chimney	1960	Poland	Sępólno Krajeńskie	45 m	
Lautagne Radio Tower		France	Valence	45 m	
Pechora TV Tower		Russia	Pechora	42 m	
Briançon Radio Tower		France	Briançon	40 m	No longer additionally guyed
Chimney of Humberstone Salpeter Works		Chile	Humberstone		commons:File:Humberstone.jpg
West Kern County Oil Museum, Wooden Drill Tower		United States	Taft, California		
Tupižnica Radio Relay Tower		Serbia	Knjazevac		
Háj u Aše Observation Tower		Czech Republic	Aš		
Anadyr TV Tower		Russia	Anadyr		
Oschatz Water Tower		Germany	Oschatz		commons:File:Fotothek df n-30 0000626 Werkansicht.jpg
Düren-Ebersdorf Water Tower		Germany	Düren		
Liebengrün Water Tower		Germany	Düren		
Haradzieja Water Tower		Belarus	Haradzieja		
Kołbacz Water Tower		Poland	Kołbacz		
Szár-hegy Observation Tower		Hungary	Szárhegy		
Capo Ferro DGPS-Radio Tower		Italy	Capo Ferro		Insulated against ground
Kazimierz Pomorski Water Tower		Poland	Kazimierz Pomorski		
Karachaevsk Transmission Mast		Russia	Kumysh		
Bescehely Újmajor Water Tower		Hungary	Bescehely Újmajor		
Havre-Aubert Lighthouse		Canada	Amherst Island		
Wyszogród Substation Radio Tower		Poland	Wyszogród		
Kołbacz Water Tower		Poland	Kołbacz		
Lysá Transmitter, Tower 2		Slovakia	Prešov		
Mansoa Radio Tower		Guinea-Bissau	Mansoa		commons:File:Mansoa Station (482985849).jpg
Willisville Tower		United States	Espanola		Dismantled in the late 1980s
Kamień Mały Radio Tower		Poland	Kamień Mały	38 m	
Rajsko Radio Tower		Poland	Rajsko	35 m	
Romanian People's Salvation Cross	2011	Moldova	Nisporeni	35 m	
Góra Sumerówka Radio Tower		Poland	Sucha Beskidzka	34.3 m	
Koniaków Radio Tower	1969	Poland	Koniaków	34 m	
Jaworzyna Radio Tower		Poland	Szczyrk	30 m	
Tower of Unity	1962	Germany	Heldrastein	30 m	Former additionally guyed lattice tower, which was transformed into observation tower
Tower of Cape Verde Atmospheric Observatory		Cape Verde	Calhau	30 m	Wooden tower
Gibberagee Tower		Australia	Gibberagee	30 m	
Sonneberg ELOKA-Tower		Germany	Sonneberg		
ELOKA-Tower Eisenacher Haus		Germany	Kaltennordheim		
Roggendorf ELOKA-Tower		Germany	Roggendorf		
Fichtelberg ELOKA-Towers		Germany	Oberwiesenthal		2 towers
Kandelstein ELOKA-Tower		Germany	Gutenfürst		
Rodacherbrunn ELOKA-Tower		Germany	Rodacherbrunn		
ELOKA-Tower Bienstädter Warte		Germany	Bienstädt		
Mount Cathead Fire Tower	1916	United States	Mount Cathead		Now used as radio relay link
Mount Wakely Fire Tower	1916	United States	Mount Wakely		
Mount Hadley Fire Tower	1916	United States	Mount Hadley		
Mount Boreas Fire Tower	1919	United States	Mount Boreas		Demolished in 1971
Mount Goodnow Fire Tower	1922	United States	Mount Goodnow		
Hartheim Forestmeteorological Tower	1985	Germany	Hartheim	30 m	Aluminium structure
Cruz de Alajuelita	1934	Costa Rica	San Jose	27 m	
TSR Gora Hutyrów		Poland	Rajcza	29.5 m	
Góra Kiczera Radio Tower		Poland	Baligród	29 m	
Góra Wysokie Tower	1993	Poland	Limanowa / Męcina	26 m	
Hochfirst Tower	1890	Germany	Titisee-Neustadt	25 m	
Berkovitsa Transmitter Tower 1 ( РРТС Петрохан)		Bulgaria	Berkovitsa	25 m	
Hraniční vrch Observation Tower	2011	Czech Republic	Město Albrechtice	25 m	
Büchenbronn Observation Tower	1883	Germany	Büchenbronn	24.75 m	
Salt Head Tower	1975	Germany	Weiler bei Bingen	24 m	Wooden observation tower
HTM NDB Miles City		United States	Miles City, Montana		Tower radiator of NDB
Mrzlica transmitter, Main Mast		Slovenia	Mrzlica		
Little America Radio Towers		Antarctica	Little America		2 towers
2 towers of Targovishte transmitter		Bulgaria	Targovishte		
Przełęcz Rędzińska Millenium Cross		Poland	Rędzińy		
Harghita transmitter		Romania	Harghita		
Reghin transmitter		Romania	Reghin		
Suceava transmitter		Romania	Suceava		
Muntele Mare transmitter		Romania	Muntele Mare		
Ferma Otopeni Water Tower		Romania	Ferma Otopeni		
Pod Europa Water Tower		Romania	Pod Europa		
Crinului Water Tower		Romania	Crinului		
Oshakati Bofors Tower		Namibia	Oshakati		
Large chimney of Tsumeb Old Smelter		Namibia	Tsumeb		
Hornkjølberget Observation Tower		Norway	Eidskog		
Værøy Radio Towers		Norway	Værøy		commons:File:Værøy Radio.jpg
Sveti Duh transmitter		Croatia	Prigorec		
Boječnice Water Tower		Czech Republic	Bor		
Drmoul Water Tower		Czech Republic	Drmoul		
Horní Heřmanice Water Tower		Czech Republic	Horní Heřmanice		
Varnsdorf Water Tower		Czech Republic	Varnsdorf		
Višňová Water Tower		Czech Republic	Višňová		
Chotěšov Water Tower		Czech Republic	Chotěšov		
Ny-Ålesund Dirigible Tower		Norway	Ny-Ålesund		
Tower of Nunavik Leading Line		Canada	Nunavik		commons:File:Nunavik tower.jpg
Krippenstein Radio Mast		Austria	Obertraun, Krippenstein Mountain		
Ulice Kukułcza Radio Tower		Poland	Zielona Góra		
Góra Grojec transmitter, small tower		Poland	Żywiec		
Swallowtail Lighthouse	1859	Canada	Grand Manan Parish	16.2 m	
Jarman Island Lighthouse	1888	Australia	Jarman Island	15.5 m	
Góra Grojec Transmitter, Small Tower		Poland	Żywiec	15 m	Demolished
Mariestad Lighthouse		Sweden	Mariestad		
Gälle Udde Lighthouse	1906	Sweden	Gälle Udde	15.5 m	
Sooner Park Playtower	1963	United States	Bartlesville, Oklahoma	15.24 m	
Akraberg Lighthouse	1909	Faroe Islands	Akraberg	14 m	
Chenal de Groumili Lighthouse	1928	France	Saint Guénolé	13 m	
Godula transmitter		Czech Republic	Komorní Lhotka	13 m	
Horst Radio Tower		Germany	Freiensteinau-Gunzenau		commons:File:Antennen auf dem Horst (Vogelsberg).jpg
Backoefele		Germany	Schneeberg		
Hetlingen Tide Measurement Tower		Germany	Hetlingen		
Semafore Vecchio		Italy	Portofino		
Nebunu Tower		Romania	Tulcea		
Wartenbergkreuz		Germany	Geisingen		
Aljaž Tower	1895	Slovenia	Triglav	1.9 m	

== See also ==
- List of partially guyed towers
