= Czerwona (river) =

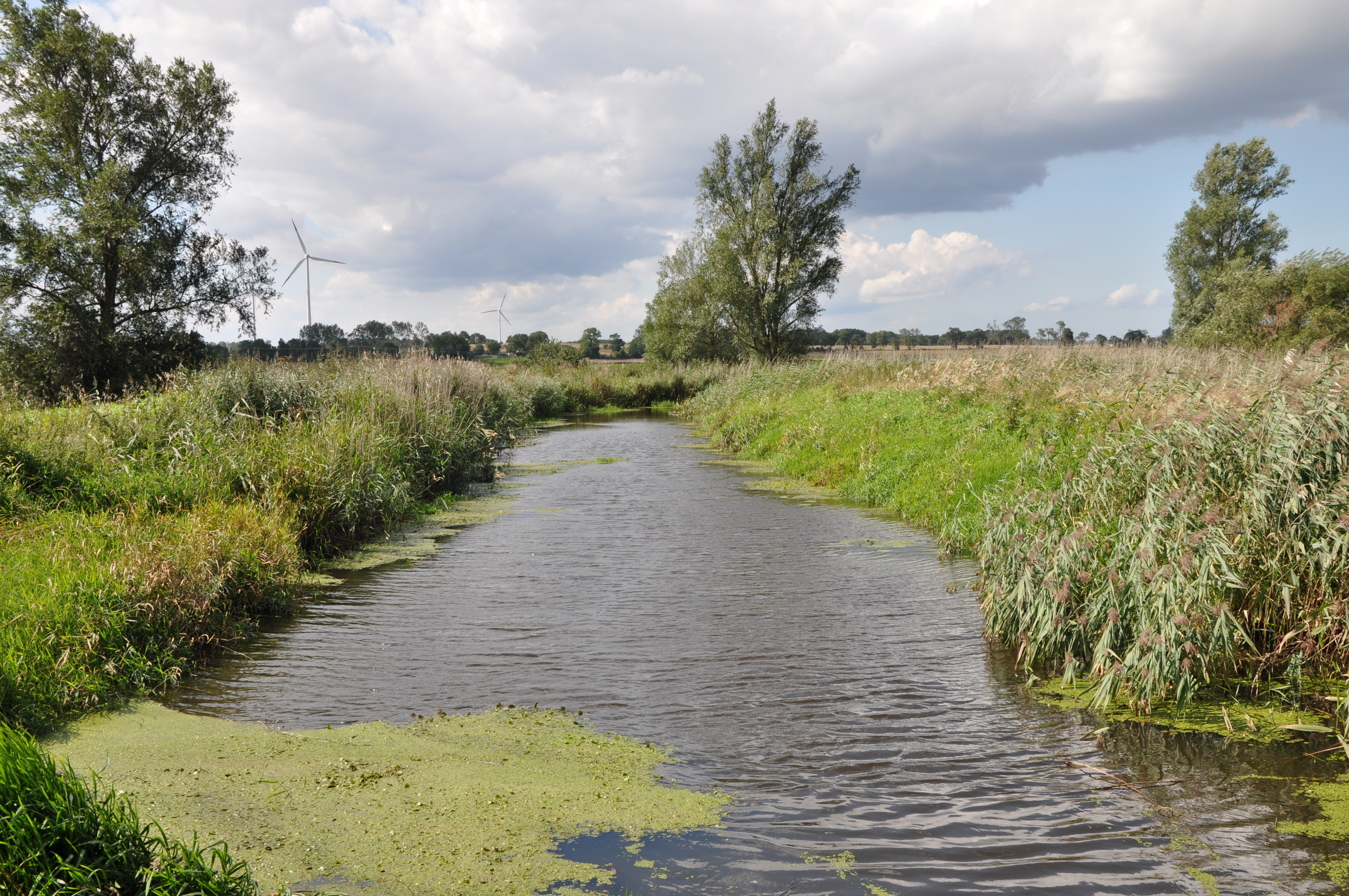
- Czerwona viewed from a bridge in Kładno

Location
- Country: Poland
- Voivodeship: West Pomeranian
- County (Powiat): Koszalin

Physical characteristics
- Source: Parnowo Lake
  - location: Parnowo, Gmina Biesiekierz
  - coordinates: 54°09′42.0″N 16°02′36.0″E
  - elevation: 28.2 m (93 ft)
- Mouth: Baltic Sea
  - location: north of Łasin Koszaliński, Gmina Będzino
  - coordinates: 54°13′45″N 15°47′56″E
- Length: 28.63–29.50 km (17.79–18.33 mi)
- Basin size: 139.26–149.56 km^{2} (53.77–57.75 sq mi)

Czerwona is a river of Poland, which terminates in the Baltic Sea near Łasin Koszaliński.
