= Kladno (disambiguation) =

Kladno is a city in the Central Bohemian Region of the Czech Republic.

Kladno may also refer to places:

- Kladno (Chrudim District), a municipality and village in the Pardubice Region, Czech Republic
- Kladno District, part of the Central Bohemian Region
- Kładno, Poland
