= Smolne =

Smolne may refer to the following places in Poland:

- Smolne, Lower Silesian Voivodeship (south-west Poland)
- Smolne, Pomeranian Voivodeship (north Poland)
- Smolne, West Pomeranian Voivodeship (north-west Poland)
