= Łabusz =

- District of Koszalin
- Location within Poland
- Coordinates: 54°16′21″N 16°10′47″E
- Country: Poland
- Voivodeship: West Pomeranian
- County: Koszalin

Łabusz [ˈwabuʂ] is a part of the city of Koszalin. Until 31 December 2009 it was a village in the administrative district of Gmina Będzino, within Koszalin County, West Pomeranian Voivodeship, in north-western Poland. It lies approximately 15 kilometres (9 mi) north-east of Będzino, 10 km (6 mi) north of Koszalin, and 142 km (88 mi) north-east of the regional capital Szczecin.

For the history of the region, see History of Pomerania.
