= Wierzchominko =

- Village
- Location within Poland
- Coordinates: 54°10′38″N 15°57′55″E
- Country: Poland
- Voivodeship: West Pomeranian
- County: Koszalin
- Gmina: Będzino

Wierzchominko [vjɛʂxɔˈminkɔ] (German: Varchminshagen) is a village in the administrative district of Gmina Będzino, within Koszalin County, West Pomeranian Voivodeship, in north-western Poland. It lies approximately 4 km (2 mi) south-west of Będzino, 15 km (9 mi) west of Koszalin, and 125 km (78 mi) north-east of the regional capital Szczecin.
