= Dworek, West Pomeranian Voivodeship =

Dworek
- Village
- Location within Poland
- Coordinates: 54°13′4″N 15°55′58″E
- Country: Poland
- Voivodeship: West Pomeranian
- County: Koszalin
- Gmina: Będzino
- Population: 180

Dworek [ˈdvɔrɛk] (German: Amalienhof) is a village in the administrative district of Gmina Będzino, within Koszalin County, West Pomeranian Voivodeship, in north-western Poland. It lies approximately 4 km (2 mi) west of Będzino, 17 km (11 mi) west of Koszalin, and 126 km (78 mi) north-east of the regional capital Szczecin.

For the history of the region, see History of Pomerania.

The village has a population of 180.
