= Hermann von Hatzfeldt =

German politician (1848–1933)

His Serene Highness Hermann von Hatzfeldt
- Prince of Hatzfeldt; Duke of Trachenberg
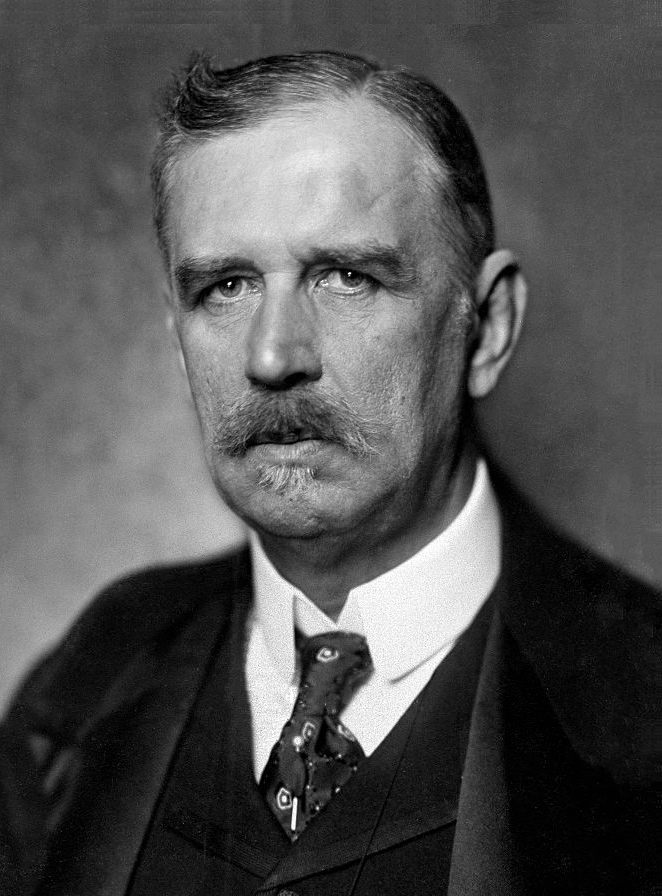
- Photograph of Prince Hatzfeldt, c. 1910
- Born: 4 February 1848; Trachenberg, Kingdom of Prussia, German Confederation
- Died: 14 January 1933 (aged 84); Trachenberg, Weimar Republic
- Noble family: House of Hatzfeld
- Spouse: Countess Nathalie von Benckendorff (m. 1872; died 1931)
- Issue: Hermann Ludwig, 2nd Duke of Trachenburg; Count Alexander
- Father: Prince Hermann Anton von Hatzfeldt-Trachenberg
- Mother: Marie von Nimptsch

Hermann Anton Leo Karl, Prince of Hatzfeldt, Duke of Trachenberg (German: Hermann Fürst von Hatzfeldt, Herzog zu Trachenberg; 4 February 1848 – 14 January 1933) was a German nobleman, member of the House of Hatzfeld, civil servant and politician. He represented the Deutsche Reichspartei in the Reichstag for a number of years.

== Early life ==
Hermann von Hatzfeldt was born in Trachenberg Castle, Silesia on 4 February 1848. He was the son of Prince Hermann Anton von Hatzfeldt-Trachenberg (1808–1874), and his second wife, Marie von Nimptsch (1820–1897). From his parents' marriage, he had a sister, Countess Hermine von Hatzfeldt, who married Eduard Teleki von Szék and Emil von Hoenning O'Carroll. From his father's first marriage to Countess Mathilde von Reichenbach-Goschütz (they divorced in 1846), he had three half-siblings, Stanislaus von Hatzfeldt (who married Countess Gisela von Dyhrn-Schönau), Franziska von Hatzfeldt (wife of Paul von Nimptsch and Baron Walter von Loë), and Elisabeth von Hatzfeldt (wife of Prince Karl zu Carolath-Beuthen). From his mother's first marriage to Baron Ludwig August von Buch, Prussian ambassador to the Holy See, he had a half-sister, Marie von Buch (who married Baron Alexander von Schleinitz, then Prussian minister of the Royal household, and Anton von Wolkenstein-Trostburg, the Austrian Ambassador in Saint Petersburg and Paris).

His father was the eldest son of Franz Ludwig von Hatzfeldt and Countess Friederike Caroline von der Schulenburg-Kehnert. Among his extended family was uncle were Max von Hatzfeldt, a Prussian diplomat who married Pauline de Castellane (daughter of Boniface de Castellane), Sophie von Hatzfeldt (partner and confidante of Ferdinand Lassalle), and Luise von Hatzfeldt (the wife of Prussian General Ludwig Freiherr Roth von Schreckenstein).

After graduating from high school, he became active in the Corps Saxonia Göttingen in 1868 and studied law at the Schlesische Friedrich-Wilhelms-Universität zu Breslau and the Friedrich-Wilhelms-Universität Berlin. The University of Breslau awarded him an honorary doctorate in medicine and law.

== Career ==
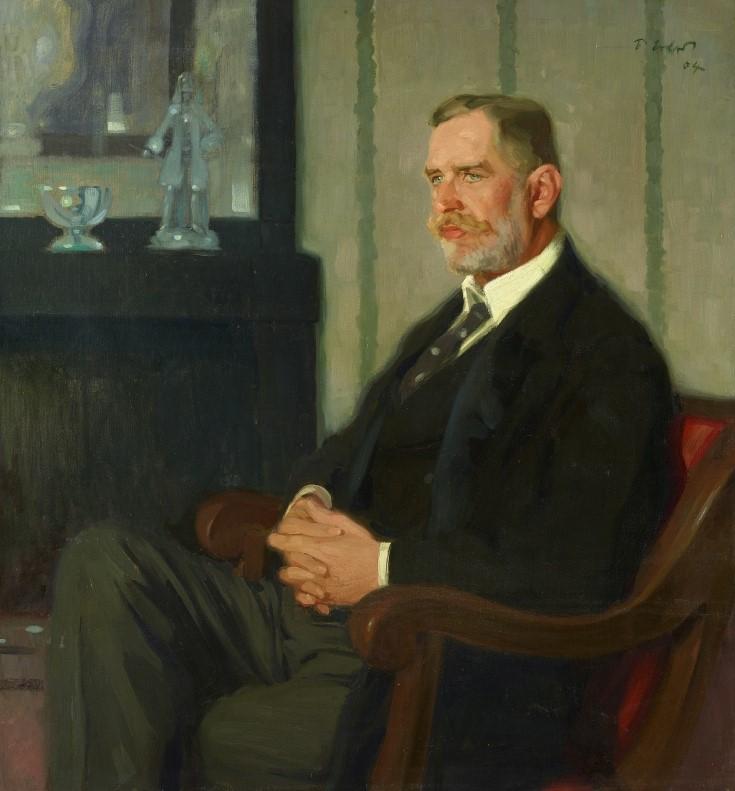
Portrait of Prince von Hatzfeldt, by Fritz Erler, 1904

Hatzfeldt entered the Prussian judicial service before serving as a cavalry major in the Franco-Prussian War from 1870 to 1871. His elder half-brother died during the Battle of Amiens in November 1870.

Upon the death of his father, who was excommunicated in 1847, he succeeded as head of the Hatzfeldt-Trachenberg line in 1874. In 1878, he was appointed hereditary member of the Prussian House of Lords, the upper house of the Landtag of Prussia. He was chairman of the "New Faction" of landowners and was also a member of the Reichstag for the Free Conservative Party in 1878/1893 and 1907/1912. He voted against the Prussian expropriation laws directed against Poles in the Province of Posen, in both the Reichstag and the Herrenhaus.

On 1 January 1900, he was given the hereditary title "Duke of Trachenberg (Herzog zu Trachenberg)" in primogeniture. From 1894 to 1903, he was the Oberpräsident of the Province of Silesia.

During World War I, Hatzfeldt was a candidate for Governor-General of occupied Poland; however, Hans Hartwig von Beseler was chosen instead. In opposition to Paul von Hindenburg and General Erich Ludendorff, he campaigned for a negotiated peace with the Entente Powers. In the years 1919 to 1921, he was the representative of the Reich government for voting in Upper Silesia. He devoted the last years of his life to charitable work in the Order of Malta.

=== Awards and honours ===
On 18 January 1901, Kaiser Wilhelm II awarded him the Order of the Black Eagle on the 200th anniversary of its foundation. Hatzfeldt's numerous awards included the highest Saxon orders including the Bailiff Grand Cross of Honour and Devotion of the Order of Malta. In 1884, he became an honorary citizen of Bojanowo (near Trachenberg), and of Breslau and Königshütte in 1903.

== Personal life ==
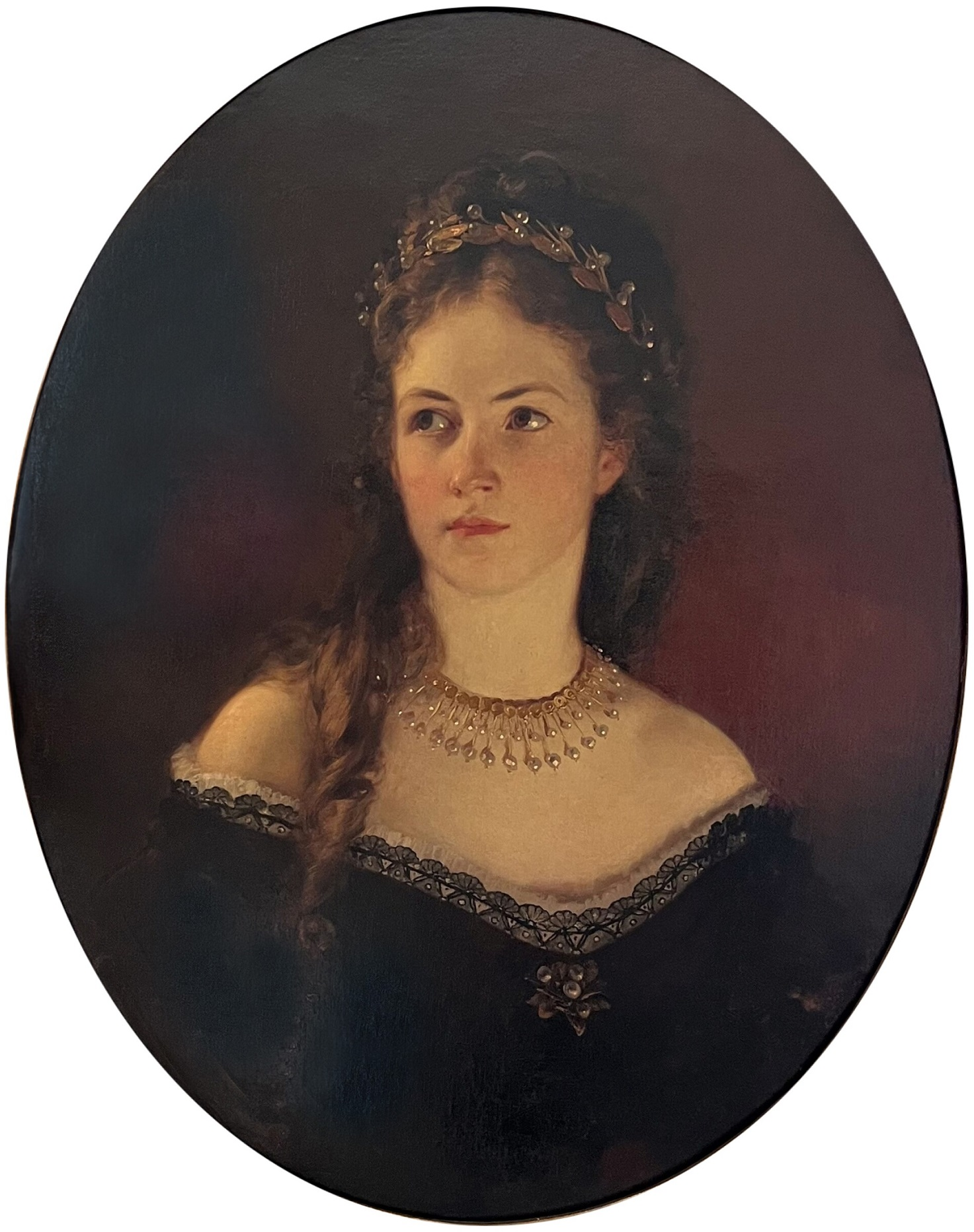
Princess Nathalie von Hatzfeldt, née Countess von Benckendorff

On 18 June 1872, Hatzfeldt married Countess Nathalie von Benckendorff (Schandau, 7 September 1854 – Trachenberg, 9 March 1931) in Berlin. She was a daughter of Russian general Konstantin Konstantinovič von Benckendorff and Princess Louise of Croÿ-Dülmen, and served as Chief Court Mistress of Empress Frederick. Nathalie's older brother was Count Alexander von Benckendorff, who served as Russian ambassador to the United Kingdom during World War I. She was also a second cousin of Archduchess Isabella of Teschen through her maternal family.

Hermann and Nathalie had two sons and seven grandchildren:

- Prince Hermann Ludwig von Hatzfeldt, 2nd Duke of Trachenberg (Gußwitz, 14 January 1874 – Baden-Baden, 24 October 1959), who in 1912 married Elisabeth von Tschirschky-Bögendorff (1889–1975); a daughter of Heinrich von Tschirschky, a German diplomat who served as Foreign Secretary and head of the Foreign Office before becoming Ambassador to Vienna.
  - Hermann Krafft Prinz von Hatzfeldt (Brussels, 24 November 1912 – Voronezh, 4 July 1942); he killed on the Eastern Front.
  - Countess Huberta (Washington, D.C., 18 October 1916 – 22 June 2014); married Count Hermann von Saurma-Jeltsch (1906–1999)
  - Countess Nathalie (Berlin, 14 February 1918 – Vienna, 21 June 2004); she was adopted by Tschirschky family.
  - Count Karl Heinrich (Berlin, 21 February 1921 – Essen, 17 February 1970); married Heyka Zeglat (1923–1997)
  - Prince Edmund von Hatzfeldt, 3rd Duke of Trachenberg (Amsterdam, 18 November 1923 – Cologne, 2 July 1997); married Baroness Sophie Spies von Büllesheim (1927–2013)
  - Count Friedrich (Trachenberg, 22 October 1928 – Cologne, 19 March 2006); married Baroness Maria Helene von Münchhausen (born 1933)
- Count Alexander von Hatzfeldt zu Trachenberg (Berlin, 10 February 1877 – Schönstein Castle in Wissen, 27 November 1953), who in 1904 married Viscountess Hanna Aoki-Rhade (1879–1953); the only daughter of Elisabeth von Rhade and Aoki Shūzō, a Japanese diplomat who served as Foreign Minister during the Meiji era.
  - Countess Hissa (Pommerswitz, 26 February 1906 – Salzburg, 4 June 1985); married Count Erwin von Neipperg (1897–1957)

Prince von Hatzfeldt died at Trachenberg on 14 January 1933.

=== Fishing interest ===
From 1892 to 1919 he was the third President of the German Fishing Association. Prince Hatzfeldt was particularly interested in the development of Silesian pond farming and his property around Trachenberg was known for its exemplary fish farming.

== Honours ==
He received the following orders and decorations:

=== German ===
- Kingdom of Prussia:
  - Knight of the Prussian Crown, 1st Class, 31 December 1884
  - Grand Cross of the Red Eagle, 31 August 1896
  - Red Cross Medal, 2nd Class, 27 January 1899
  - Knight of the Black Eagle, 18 January 1901; with Collar, 17 January 1902
  - Knight of Merit of the Prussian Crown, 22 June 1903
- (Saxe-Coburg and Gotha) (Duchy of Saxe-Altenburg) (Saxe-Meiningen) Ernestine duchies: Grand Cross of the Saxe-Ernestine House Order, 1875
- Mecklenburg: Grand Cross of the Wendish Crown, with Crown in Ore
- Kingdom of Saxony: Grand Cross of the Albert Order, with Golden Star, 1896
- Württemberg: Grand Cross of the Württemberg Crown, 1892

=== Foreign ===
- Austria-Hungary: Grand Cross of the Imperial Order of Leopold, 1900
- Kingdom of Italy: Grand Cross of Saints Maurice and Lazarus
- Holy See: Grand Cross of the Order of Pope Pius IX
- Sovereign Military Order of Malta: Bailiff Grand Cross of Honour and Devotion
- Ottoman Empire: Order of Osmanieh, 1st Class in Diamonds
- Russian Empire: Knight of St. Alexander Nevsky

=== Military appointments ===
- Major general à la suite of the Prussian Army, 27 January 1898

== Ancestry ==
Ancestors of Hermann von Hatzfeldt

8. Karl Ferdinand, Count of Hatzfeldt-Wildenburg
4. Franz Ludwig, 1st Prince of Hatzfeldt-Trachenberg
9. Baroness Maria Anna Elisabeth von Venningen
2. Hermann Anton, 2nd Prince of Hatzfeldt-Trachenberg
10. Count Friedrich Wilhelm von der Schulenburg-Kehnert
5. Countess Friederike Karoline von der Schulenburg-Kehnert
11. Helene Sophie Wilhelmine von Arnstedt
1. Hermann, 3rd Prince of Hatzfeldt, 1st Duke of Trachenberg
12. Karl Theodor Gottfried von Nimptsch
6. Karl Friedrich von Nimptsch
13. Caroline Friederike Materne
3. Marie von Nimptsch
14. Leopold Emanuel Valentin Hentschel von Gilgenheimb
7. Leocadie Hentschel von Gilgenheimb
15. Baroness Maria Anna von Welczeck

Hermann, 3rd Prince of Hatzfeldt, 1st Duke of Trachenberg House of Hatzfeldt-Trachenberg Cadet branch of the House of Hatzfeldt Born: 4 February 1848 Died: 14 January 1933
German nobility
Preceded by Hermann Anton, 2nd Prince of Hatzfeldt	Prince of Hatzfeldt; 20 July 1874 – 11 August 1919	Succeeded by German nobility titles abolished
New title	Duke of Trachenberg; 1 January 1900 – 11 August 1919	Succeeded by German nobility titles abolished
Titles in pretence
Loss of title	— TITULAR — Prince of Hatzfeldt; 11 August 1919 – 14 January 1933	Succeeded by Hermann Ludwig, 4th Prince of Hatzfeldt, 2nd Duke of Trachenberg
Loss of title	— TITULAR — Duke of Trachenberg; 11 August 1919 – 14 January 1933	Succeeded by Hermann Ludwig, 4th Prince of Hatzfeldt, 2nd Duke of Trachenberg
