= Pakosław =

Pakosław may refer to the following places:

- Pakosław, Nowy Tomyśl County in Greater Poland Voivodeship (west-central Poland)
- Pakosław, Rawicz County in Greater Poland Voivodeship (west-central Poland)
- Pakosław, Masovian Voivodeship (east-central Poland)
- Pakosław, West Pomeranian Voivodeship (north-west Poland)
