= Skrzeszewo, West Pomeranian Voivodeship =

Skrzeszewo
- Village
- Location within Poland
- Coordinates: 54°13′N 15°56′E
- Country: Poland
- Voivodeship: West Pomeranian
- County: Koszalin
- Gmina: Będzino

Skrzeszewo [skʂɛˈʂɛvɔ] (German: Schreitstaken) is a village in the administrative district of Gmina Będzino, within Koszalin County, West Pomeranian Voivodeship, in north-western Poland. It lies approximately 4 km (2 mi) west of Będzino, 17 km (11 mi) west of Koszalin, and 126 km (78 mi) north-east of the regional capital Szczecin.

For the history of the region, see History of Pomerania.
