= Dobiesławiec =

- Village
- Location within Poland
- Coordinates: 54°14′20″N 16°6′39″E
- Country: Poland
- Voivodeship: West Pomeranian
- County: Koszalin
- Gmina: Będzino

Dobiesławiec [dɔbjɛˈswavjɛt͡s] (German: Neuenhagen) is a village in the administrative district of Gmina Będzino, within Koszalin County, West Pomeranian Voivodeship, in north-western Poland. It lies approximately 9 km (6 mi) north-east of Będzino, 8 km (5 mi) north-west of Koszalin, and 136 km (85 mi) north-east of the regional capital Szczecin.

For the history of the region, see History of Pomerania.
