= Wierzchomino =

- Village
- Location within Poland
- Coordinates: 54°10′10″N 15°58′8″E
- Country: Poland
- Voivodeship: West Pomeranian
- County: Koszalin
- Gmina: Będzino

Wierzchomino [vjɛʂxɔˈminɔ] (German Varchmin) is a village in the administrative district of Gmina Będzino, within Koszalin County, West Pomeranian Voivodeship, in north-western Poland. It lies approximately 5 km (3 mi) south of Będzino, 15 km (9 mi) west of Koszalin, and 124 km (77 mi) north-east of the regional capital Szczecin.
