= Śmiechów =

- Village
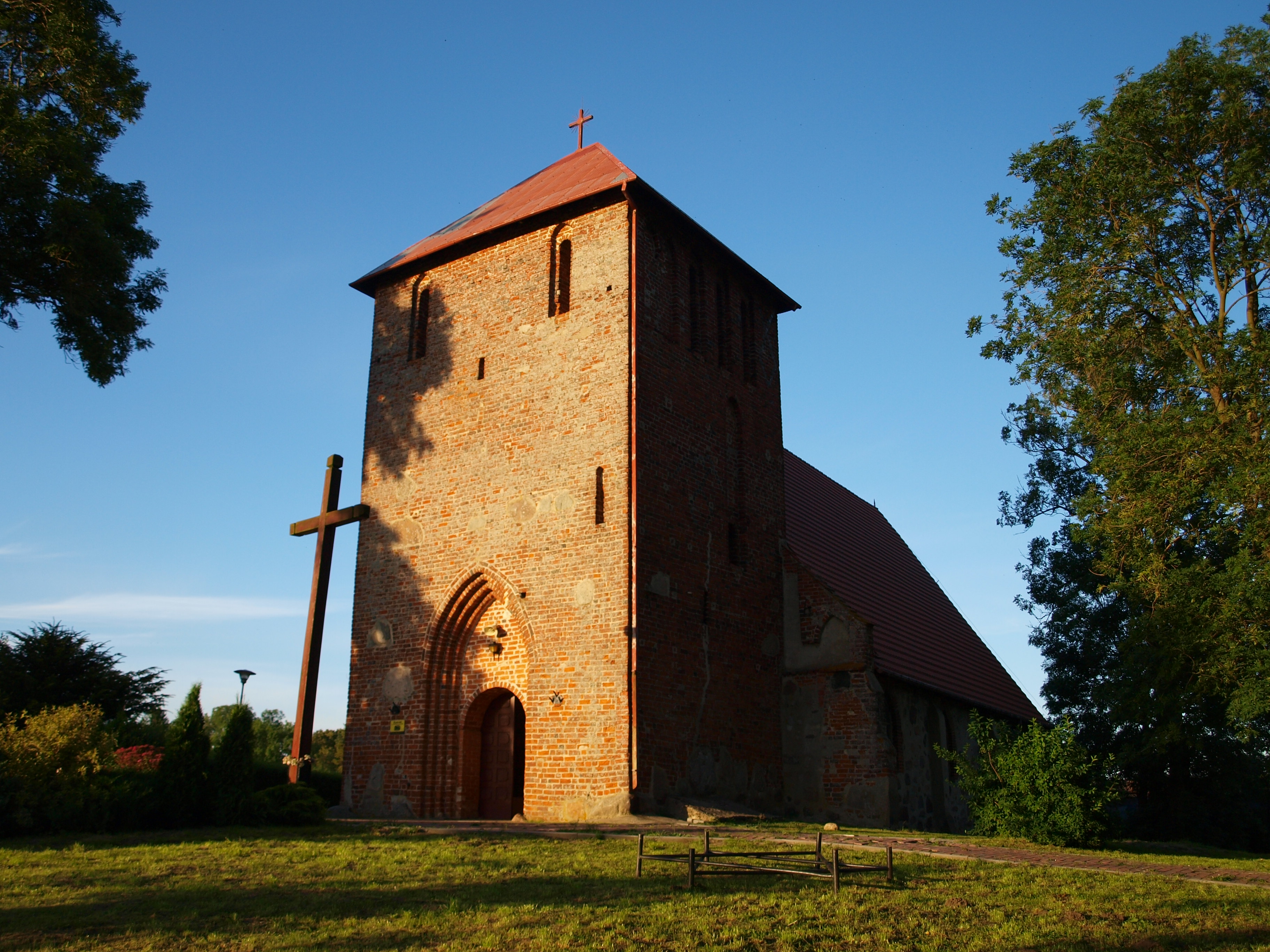
- Our Lady Queen of Poland church in Śmiechów

- Location within Poland
- Coordinates: 54°12′47″N 15°53′2″E
- Country: Poland
- Voivodeship: West Pomeranian
- County: Koszalin
- Gmina: Będzino

Śmiechów [ˈɕmjɛxuf] (German: Schulzenhagen) is a village in the administrative district of Gmina Będzino, within Koszalin County, West Pomeranian Voivodeship, in north-western Poland. It lies approximately 7 km (4 mi) west of Będzino, 20 km (12 mi) west of Koszalin, and 123 km (76 mi) north-east of the regional capital Szczecin.

For the history of the region, see History of Pomerania.
