= Będzinko =

- Village
- Location within Poland
- Coordinates: 54°13′3″N 15°59′4″E
- Country: Poland
- Voivodeship: West Pomeranian
- County: Koszalin
- Gmina: Będzino

Będzinko [bɛnˈd͡ʑinkɔ] (German: Neu Bandzin) is a village in the administrative district of Gmina Będzino, within Koszalin County, West Pomeranian Voivodeship, in north-western Poland. It lies approximately 2 km (1 mi) north of Będzino, 14 km (9 mi) west of Koszalin, and 128 km (80 mi) north-east of the regional capital Szczecin.

For the history of the region, see History of Pomerania.
