= Popowo, Koszalin County =

Popowo
- Village
- Location within Poland
- Coordinates: 54°10′42″N 16°0′36″E
- Country: Poland
- Voivodeship: West Pomeranian
- County: Koszalin
- Gmina: Będzino

Popowo [pɔˈpɔvɔ] (German: Poppenhagen) is a village in the administrative district of Gmina Będzino, within Koszalin County, West Pomeranian Voivodeship, in north-western Poland. It lies approximately 4 km (2 mi) south of Będzino, 12 km (7 mi) west of Koszalin, and 127 km (79 mi) north-east of the regional capital Szczecin.

For the history of the region, see History of Pomerania.
