= Dobre Małe =

- Settlement
- Location within Poland
- Coordinates: 54°11′31″N 16°2′23″E
- Country: Poland
- Voivodeship: West Pomeranian
- County: Koszalin
- Gmina: Będzino

Dobre Małe [ˈdɔbrɛ ˈmawɛ] (German: Klein Todenhagen) is a settlement in the administrative district of Gmina Będzino, within Koszalin County, West Pomeranian Voivodeship, in north-western Poland. It lies approximately 4 km (2 mi) south-east of Będzino, 10 km (6 mi) west of Koszalin, and 129 km (80 mi) north-east of the regional capital Szczecin.

For the history of the region, see History of Pomerania.
