= Aoki Shūzō =

Japanese diplomat

Senior Second Rank Viscount Aoki Shūzō
- 青木 周蔵
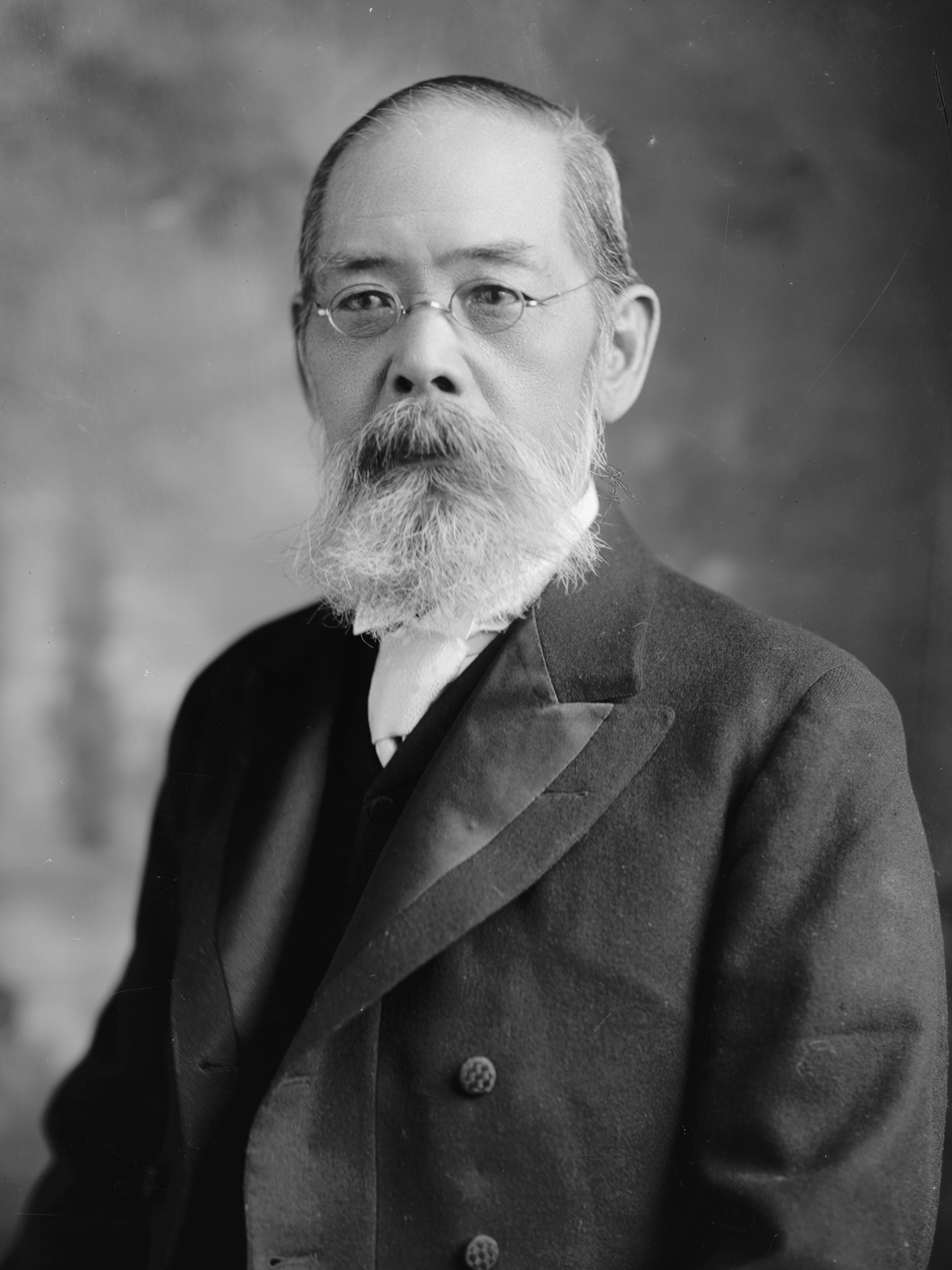

Japanese Ambassador to the United States
- In office 24 April 1906 – 3 February 1908
- Prime Minister: Saionji Kinmochi
- Preceded by: Takahira Kogorō
- Succeeded by: Takahira Kogorō

Minister for Foreign Affairs
- In office 8 November 1898 – 19 October 1900
- Prime Minister: Yamagata Aritomo
- Preceded by: Ōkuma Shigenobu
- Succeeded by: Katō Takaaki
- In office 24 December 1889 – 29 May 1891
- Prime Minister: Yamagata Aritomo; Matsukata Masayoshi
- Preceded by: Ōkuma Shigenobu
- Succeeded by: Enomoto Takeaki

Member of the Privy Council
- In office 6 February 1908 – 16 February 1914
- Monarchs: Meiji; Taishō
- In office 25 November 1901 – 7 January 1906
- Monarch: Meiji
- In office 8 November 1889 – 24 December 1889
- Monarch: Meiji

Member of the House of Peers
- In office 10 July 1890 – 10 July 1897 Nominated by the Emperor

Personal details
- Born: 3 March 1844 Ohabu-mura, Chōshū, Japan
- Died: 16 February 1914 (aged 69) Kōjimachi, Tokyo, Japan
- Spouse: Elisabeth von Rhade (m. 1877)
- Children: Hanna Aoki
- Relatives: Morihisa Aoki (great-grandson)
- Education: Meirinkan
- Occupation: Diplomat, politician

Viscount Aoki Shūzō (青木 周蔵; 3 March 1844 – 16 February 1914) was a Japanese politician and diplomat who served as foreign minister during the Meiji era.

== Early life ==
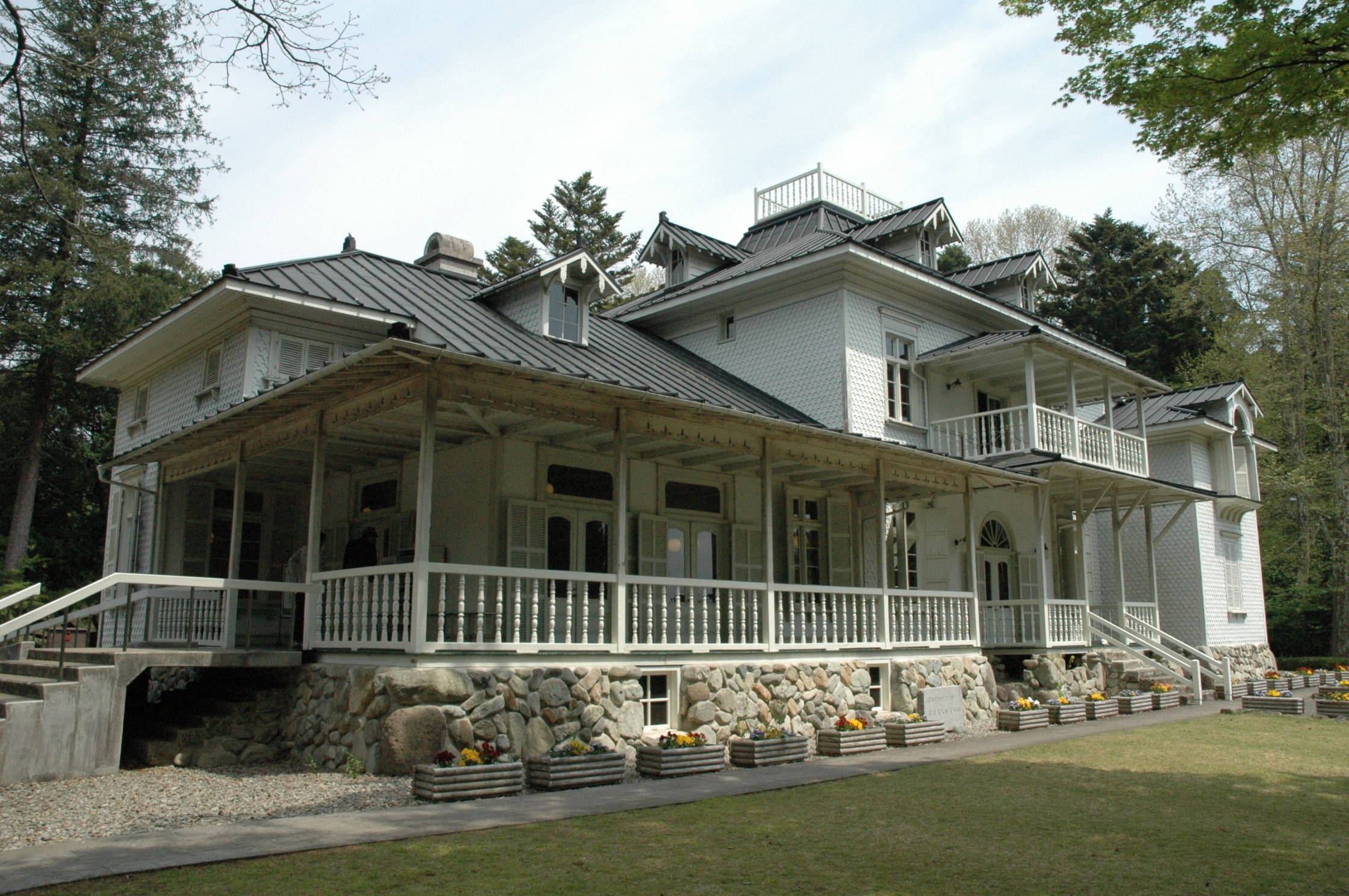
Aoki villa in Nasushiobara

Aoki was born to a samurai family as the son of the domain physician of Chōshū, in what is now part of San'yō-Onoda in Yamaguchi Prefecture. He studied western science and medicine (rangaku) at the domain school Meirinkan in Hagi, and in Nagasaki.

He was then sent to Germany by the Chōshū Domain to study western law in 1868. However, while in Germany, his studies ranged over a very wide area, from western medicine, to politics, military science, and economics. From his surviving notes, he studied how to make beer, paper and paper money, carpets and rugs and techniques of western forestry management.

== Career ==
Aoki returned to Japan after the Meiji Restoration, and entered the Foreign Ministry of the new Meiji government in 1873, as First Secretary to the Japanese legations to Germany, Netherlands and Austria-Hungary. He then served as Vice Foreign Minister in the First Itō Cabinet and Foreign Minister in the First Yamagata Cabinet.

=== Foreign minister (first) ===
While foreign minister, he strove for the revision of the unequal treaties between the Empire of Japan and the various European powers, particularly the extraterritoriality clauses, and expressed concern over the eastern expansion of the Russian Empire into east Asia. Aoki was forced to resign as a consequence of the Ōtsu Incident of 1891, but resumed his post as Foreign Minister under the Matsukata administration.

During his time as minister, Viscount Aoki was instrumental in the development of the internal program for Transfers of technology and advice on systems and cultural ways. By the hand of Aoki, over a dozen of specialized western professionals were brought to Japan in 1887, not only at a governmental level but also into the private sector. Amongst these so called "O-yatoi gaikokujin" were prominent figures including W. K. Burton, Ottmar von Mohl, Albert Favre Zanuti, Henry Spencer Palmer, Hermann Ende, Wilhelm Böckmann, Rudolf Dittrich and Ludwig Riess.

=== Ambassador to the United Kingdom ===
In 1894, as ambassador to Great Britain, Aoki worked with Foreign Minister Mutsu Munemitsu towards the revision of the unequal treaties, successfully concluding the Anglo-Japanese Treaty of Commerce and Navigation for Japan in London on 16 July 1894.

=== Foreign minister (second) ===
Returned to his post as foreign minister under the second Yamagata administration, Aoki helped Japan gain recognition as one of the Great Powers by its military support of the European forces during the Boxer Rebellion.

Aoki was then appointed to the Privy Council and elevated in title to shishaku (viscount).

=== Ambassador to the United States ===
In 1906, he was appointed ambassador to the United States. In 1908, Aoki protested to President Theodore Roosevelt to stop racial hostility against Japanese immigrants in California, there were anti-Asian groups and bills that discriminated against the Japanese, which included segregation of Japanese children in schools. Californians did not want Japanese immigrants to dominate the state's agricultural economy, as the Japanese bought their own land and refused to work for white Californians. Aoki negotiated with Roosevelt and reached an agreement to restrict passports, deport some Japanese, and withdraw anti-alien bills. Although this did not stop the immigration of the Japanese or future discriminatory legislation, it did reduce diplomatic hostility.

== Personal life ==
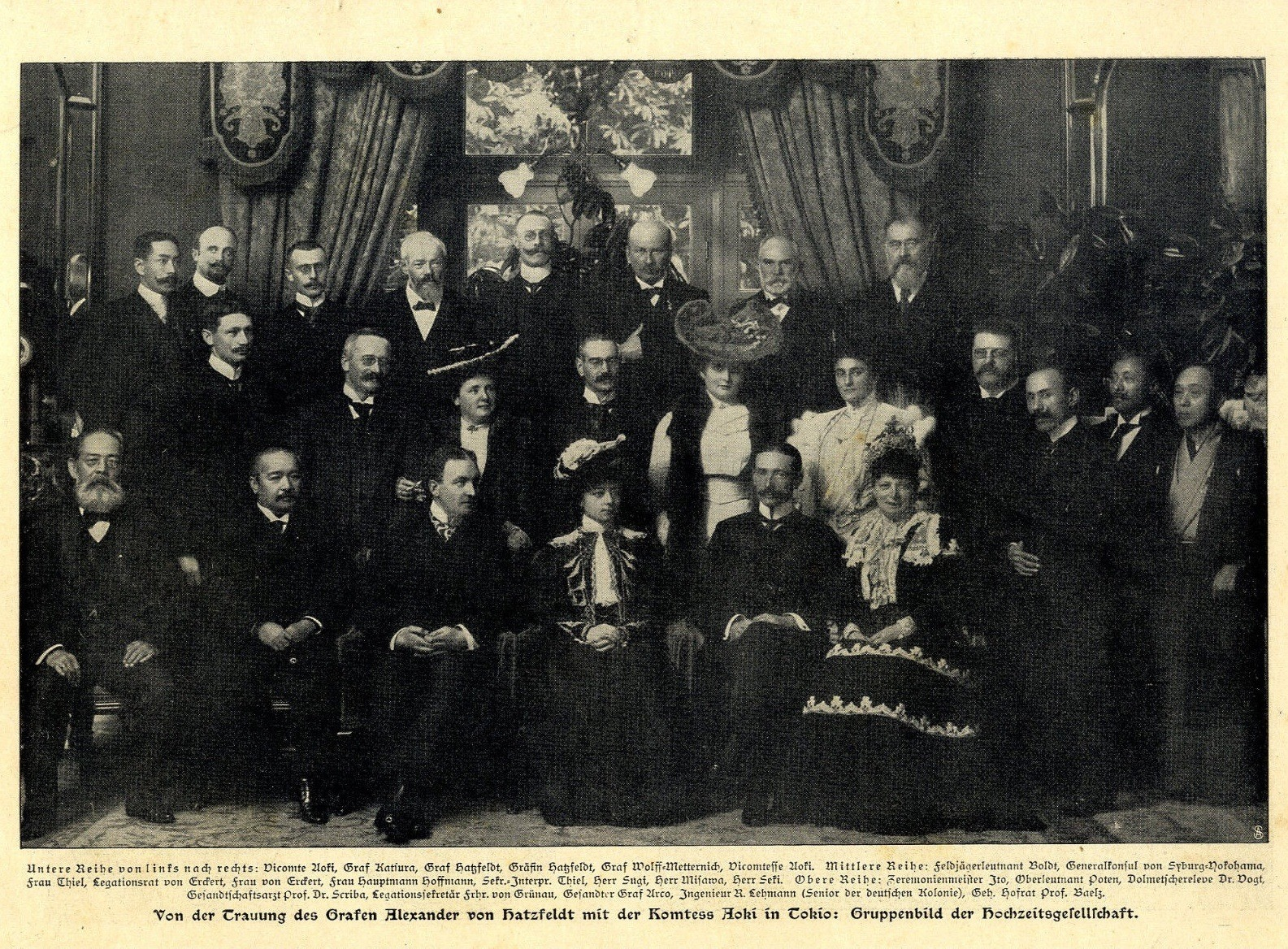
The wedding of Aoki's daughter Hanna and Count von Hatzfeldt in 1904

On 20 April 1877, Aoki married Elisabeth von Rhade (1849–1931) in Bremen. Elisabeth, the daughter of a Prussian aristocrat, was born in Strippow, Pomerania, Prussia, Germany. Together, they had one daughter:

- Viscountess Aoki Hanna (Hanako) (16 December 1879 – 24 June 1953), who married Alexander Maria Hermann Melchior, Count von Hatzfeldt zu Trachenberg (1877–1953), the second son of Prince Hermann von Hatzfeldt, in Tokyo, on 19 December 1904.

Aoki died of complications following Pneumonia in 1914 at his home in Kōjimachi, Tokyo. His grave is at Nasu, Tochigi. His widow died on 5 April 1931 in Munich, Bavaria, Germany.

=== Descendants ===
Through his daughter, he was a grandfather of Countess Hissa Elisabeth Natalie Olga Ilsa von Hatzfeldt zu Trachenberg (26 February 1906 – 4 June 1985), who married Count Maria Erwin Joseph Sidonius Benediktus Franziskus von Sales Petrus Friedrich Ignatius Hubertus Johannes von Nepomuk Felix Maurus von Neipperg (a great-grandson of Austrian general Adam Albert von Neipperg) in Munich in 1927. Erwin and Hissa had four children, but now extinct in the male line. Hissa's daughter Countess Maria Hedwig Gabrielle Nathalie Benedicta Lioba Laurentia von Neipperg (born 10 August 1929) married Sir Anthony Williams, the British ambassador to Argentina during the Falklands War.

Morihisa Aoki (born 23 November 1938), Japanese ambassador to Peru during the Japanese embassy hostage crisis was his adopted great-grandson.

=== Aoki villa ===
In 1888 Aoki commissioned an architect and friend from Berlin times, Matsugasaki Tsumunaga (1858–1921), to build him a villa as resort in Nasu highlands. This villa was costly restored in recent years and entered the list of Important Cultural Properties of Japan. Matsugasaki won Aoki as first president of the newly established Society of Japanese Architects in 1888.

== Awards and decorations ==
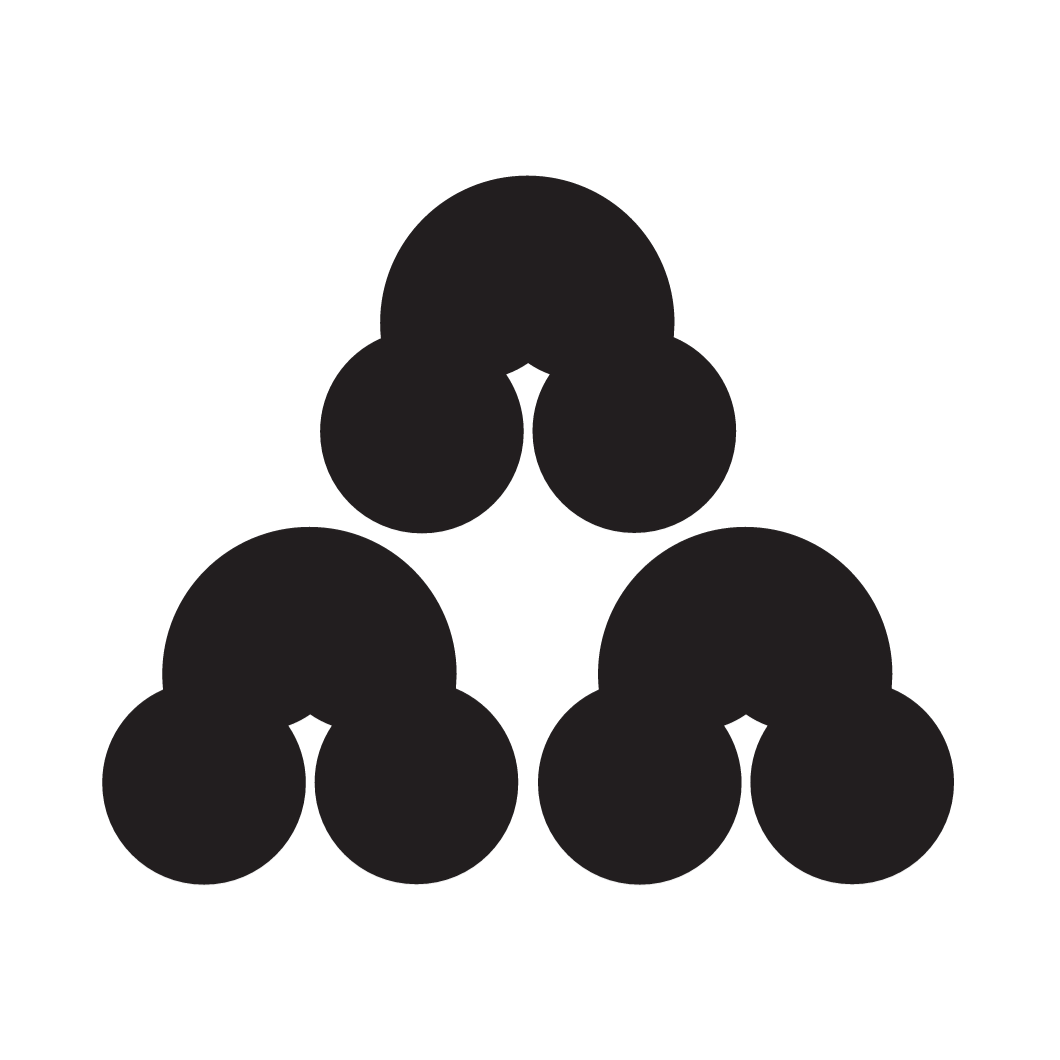
Kamon of Viscount Aoki

=== Japanese ===
==== Peerages and titles ====
- Viscount (9 May 1887)

==== Court ranks ====
- Senior Sixth Rank (15 November 1873)
- Junior Fourth Rank (5 November 1874)
- Junior Third Rank (20 October 1886)
- Junior Second Rank (7 February 1890)
- Senior Second Rank (16 February 1914; posthumous)

==== Decorations ====
Year awarded	Ribbon	Decoration	Notes
6 February 1878		Order of the Rising Sun, 3rd Class	
27 March 1880		Order of the Rising Sun, 2nd Class	
25 November 1889		Imperial Constitution Promulgation Medal	
30 June 1890		Order of the Sacred Treasure, 1st Class	
29 August 1894		Grand Cordon of the Order of the Rising Sun	
1 August 1912		Korean Annexation Commemorative Medal	
26 September 1913		Imperial Cup with the Royal Crest	
16 February 1914		Grand Cordon of the Order of the Rising Sun with Paulownia Flowers	(posthumous)

=== Foreign ===
Year awarded	Country	Ribbon	Decoration	Notes
26 February 1879	Kingdom of Saxony		Grand Cross of the Albert Order	(Note: Awarded by the King of Saxony on 28 November 1878.)
21 December 1880	German Empire		Order of the Crown, Knight 1st Class	(Note: Awarded by the King of Prussia on 30 August 1880.)
21 December 1882	Netherlands		Grand Cross of the Netherlands Lion	(Note: Awarded by the King of the Netherlands on 4 February 1882.)
21 December 1882	Saxe-Weimar-Eisenach		Grand Cross of the White Falcon	(Note: Awarded by the Grand Duke of Saxe-Weimar-Eisenach on 24 June 1882.)
25 December 1885	German Empire		Order of the Red Eagle, Knight 1st Class	(Note: Awarded by the King of Prussia on 16 September 1885.)
25 December 1885	Saxe-Coburg-Gotha		Grand Cross of the Saxe-Ernestine House Order	
25 December 1885	Mecklenburg		Grand Cross of the Griffon	
27 September 1887	Kingdom of Portugal		Grand Cross of the Order of Christ	
21 February 1888	Kingdom of Siam		Knight Grand Cross of the Crown	
7 May 1889	Russian Empire		Order of Saint Anna, 1st class	
27 May 1891	Ottoman Empire		Order of the Medjidie, 1st Class	
17 August 1895	German Empire		Grand Cross of the Red Eagle	(Note: Awarded by the King of Prussia on 26 January 1895.)
17 August 1895	Kingdom of Bavaria		Order of St. Michael, Knight 1st Class	(Note: Awarded by the Prince Regent of Bavaria on 7 November 1894.)
17 August 1895	Ottoman Empire		Order of Osmanieh, 1st Class	
4 October 1897	German Empire		Grand Cross of the Red Eagle in Brilliants	(Note: Awarded by the King of Prussia on 18 June 1897.)
22 July 1902	Denmark		Grand Cross of the Dannebrog	

== See also ==
- List of Japanese ministers, envoys and ambassadors to Germany

== Notes ==
Political offices
Preceded by Ōkuma Shigenobu	Minister for Foreign Affairs of Japan; 24 December 1889 – 29 May 1891	Succeeded by Enomoto Takeaki
Preceded by Ōkuma Shigenobu	Minister for Foreign Affairs of Japan; 8 November 1898 – 19 October 1900	Succeeded by Katō Takaaki
