= Podamirowo =

- Settlement
- Location within Poland
- Coordinates: 54°15′21″N 16°5′55″E
- Country: Poland
- Voivodeship: West Pomeranian
- County: Koszalin
- Gmina: Będzino

Podamirowo [pɔdamiˈrɔvɔ] (German: Puddemsdorf) is a settlement in the administrative district of Gmina Będzino, within Koszalin County, West Pomeranian Voivodeship, in north-western Poland. It lies approximately 9 km (6 mi) north-east of Będzino, 10 km (6 mi) north-west of Koszalin, and 137 km (85 mi) north-east of the regional capital Szczecin.

For the history of the region, see History of Pomerania.
