= Ziębrze =

- Village
- Location within Poland
- Coordinates: 54°11′20″N 16°0′24″E
- Country: Poland
- Voivodeship: West Pomeranian
- County: Koszalin
- Gmina: Będzino

Ziębrze [ˈʑɛmbʐɛ] (German: Leinbach) is a village in the administrative district of Gmina Będzino, within Koszalin County, West Pomeranian Voivodeship, in north-western Poland. It lies approximately 3 km (2 mi) south-east of Będzino, 12 km (7 mi) west of Koszalin, and 127 km (79 mi) north-east of the regional capital Szczecin.
