= List of partially guyed towers =

A partially guyed tower is a tower structure which consists of a free-standing base, with a guyed mast on the top. This is a list of partially guyed towers.

Tower	Year	Country	Town	Pinnacle height	Remarks	Ref
Gerbrandy Tower	1961	Netherlands	IJsselstein	366.8 m		
Vännäs TV Tower	1988	Sweden	Vännäs	323 m		
Høiåsmasten	1980	Norway	Halden	320 m		
Zendstation Smilde	1959	Netherlands	Smilde	303.5 m		
Cutler Naval Station	1960	United States	Cutler, Maine	? m		
Brunnby transmitter	?	Sweden	Uppsala	225 m		
TV Tower Brest - Roc'h Trédudon	1974	France	Roc Trédudon	220 m	lattice tower as basement	
Greipstad transmitter	1958	Norway	Kristiansand	218 m		
Telecommunication Tower Aarhus	1956	Denmark	Arhus	216.1 m		
Sörmon TV Tower	1967	Sweden	Karlstad	184 m		
Nordhue transmitter	?	Norway	Elverum, Innlandet	182 m	lattice tower as basement	
Kekesteto TV Tower	1981	Hungary	Kekesteto	178 m		
Brudaremossen masts	1980	Sweden	Gothenburg	172 m		
Sendeturm Dobratsch	1971	Austria	Dobratsch Mountain	165 m		
Tihange Nuclear Power Station, Unit 2	1982	Belgium	Huy	161.21 m	Reactor building with steel chimney guyed to the ground on the top	
Tihange Nuclear Power Station, Unit 1	1975	Belgium	Huy	161.18 m	Reactor building with steel chimney guyed to the ground on the top	
Tihange Nuclear Power Station, Unit 3	1985	Belgium	Huy	160.79 m	Reactor building with steel chimney guyed to the ground on the top	
Lyngdal transmitter	1954	Norway	Lyngdal	156 m		
Gamlemsveten transmitter		Norway	Haram	154 m		
Tighina TV Tower	?	Moldova	Tighina	152 m		
Shchyolkovo Radio Mast	?	Russia	Shchyolkovo	150 m	Mast radiator on small lattice tower	
Steinfjellet transmitter	?	Norway	Bremanger	148 m		
Mont Agel Broadcasting Mast	1946	France	Fontbonne	145 m	originally mast radiator with lattice tower as basement, today used for FM-/TV-broadcasting	
Waldenburg TV Tower	?	Germany	Waldenburg	145 m	antenna mast dismantled in 2009	
Mekhzavod Radio Mast	?	Russia	Mekhzavod	142 m	Mast radiator on small lattice tower	
Sendeturm Jauerling	1958	Austria	Jauerling	141 m	lattice tower as basement	
Hoherodskopf old telecommunication tower	?	Germany	Hoherodskopf	?	lattice tower as basement, replaced by Hoherodskopf telecommunication tower	
Gera Telecommunication Tower		Germany	Gera	126.5 m	originally free-standing	
Geitfjellet transmitter	1962	Norway	Grong	131 m		
Lakssvelafjellet transmitter	?	Norway	Bjerkreim	130 m		
Wachberg transmitter	?	Austria	Weitra	130 m		
Mount Corhanwarrabul, Channel 7 Tower	1956	Australia	Mount Dandenong, Victoria	131 m	Lattice tower as basement	
Torfhaus Telekom Transmitter	?	Germany	Torfhaus	130 m	was transformed in a pure guyed mast	
Tokaj TV Tower	1960	Hungary	Tokaj	130 m		
Ylöjärvi TV Tower	?	Finland	Ylöjärvi	124 m		
Transmitter Geiersberg	?	Germany	Geiersberg	124 m	lattice tower as basement	
Criuleni TV Tower	?	Moldova	Criuleni	123 m		
Transmission Tower Lindenfels	?	Germany	Lindenfels	122 m	lattice tower as basement	
Transmitter Boppard	?	Germany	Boppard-Fleckertshöhe	121 m	lattice tower as basement	
Makarki Directional Radio Tower	?	Poland	Makarki	120 m	lattice tower as basement	
Uzd TV Tower	?	Hungary	Uzd	120 m		
Transmission Tower Hesselberg	?	Germany	Hesselberg	119 m	lattice tower as basement	
Hegyhátsál TV Tower	?	Hungary	Hegyhátsál	117 m		
Gelukskroon transmitter, main tower	?	South Africa	Pretoria	112.8 m		
Lifjellmast	?	Norway	Homersak	111 m	lattice tower as basement	
Kopparen transmitter	?	Norway	Bjugn	102 m	lattice tower as basement	
Reichenhain Transmission Tower	?	Germany	Chemnitz	99 m	lattice tower as basement, was before June 2007 free-standing	
Mount Ślęża transmitter	1958	Poland	Mount Ślęża	98 m	dismantled, after taller additionally guyed tower was built in 1972	
Bealadangan Radio Mast	?	Ireland	Galway	91.4 m		
Pietricica transmitter	?	Romania	Piatra Neamţ	87 m		
Still Pond Signal Tower	?	United States	Still Pond, Maryland	83.8 m		
Towers on roof of Heckeshorn Shelter	1948	Germany	Berlin	? m	2 towers, were used from 1948 to 1967 for a radio relay link to Lower Saxony. Dismantled in 1967	
Coburg-Eckardtsberg Radio Tower	?	Germany	Coburg	68 m	prefabricated concrete tower as basement	
Kvasovka Radio Tower	?	Russia	Kvasovka	? m	Pinnacle guyed on ground and on 4 crossbars mounted on the lower part of the tower	
Some towers at Irazú Antenna Farm	?	Costa Rica	San Rafael de Irazú	?		
Alfândega da Fé Transmitter	?	Portugal	Alfândega da Fé	?		
Monte do Faro transmitter	?	Portugal	Valença	?		
Valença Rádio Comercial transmitter	?	Portugal	Valença	?		
Shabla transmitter	?	Bulgaria	Shabla	? m		
New Unit of Volgodonskaya TEC-1	?	Russia	Volgodonsk	? m		
Witthohsteige Radio Tower	?	Germany	Tuttlingen	58.5 m	prefabricated concrete tower as basement	
Old TV-Tower Inselberg	1939	Germany	Inselsberg Mountain	43.31 m	aerial mast removed	
Collmberg Three-Leg Tower	1953	Germany	Collmberg	40 m	demolished	
Windisch Bleiberg Transmission Tower	?	Austria	Windisch Bleiberg	?		
TSR Polana	?	Poland	Sokolowsko	35 m		
Campobasso Transmitter	1959	Italy	Campobasso	?	mast radiator on castle	
Le Gravier Rouge Water Tower	?	France	Vienne	?	Guyed mast on a water tower	
Chełmiec Radio Mast	?	Poland	Chełmiec	?	Guyed mast on castle ruin	
Wrights Hill Radio Tower	?	New Zealand	Wellington	?		

== See also ==
- List of additionally guyed towers
