= Słowienkowo =

- Village
- Location within Poland
- Coordinates: 54°12′21″N 15°55′40″E
- Country: Poland
- Voivodeship: West Pomeranian
- County: Koszalin
- Gmina: Będzino

Słowienkowo [swɔvjɛnˈkɔvɔ] (German: Wolfshagen) is a village in the administrative district of Gmina Będzino, within Koszalin County, West Pomeranian Voivodeship, in north-western Poland. It lies approximately 5 km (3 mi) west of Będzino, 17 km (11 mi) west of Koszalin, and 125 km (78 mi) north-east of the regional capital Szczecin.

For the history of the region, see History of Pomerania.
