= Zagaj, West Pomeranian Voivodeship =

Zagaj
- Settlement
- Location within Poland
- Coordinates: 54°14′10″N 15°58′44″E
- Country: Poland
- Voivodeship: West Pomeranian
- County: Koszalin
- Gmina: Będzino

Zagaj [ˈzaɡai̯] is a settlement in the administrative district of Gmina Będzino, within Koszalin County, West Pomeranian Voivodeship, in north-western Poland. It lies approximately 4 km (2 mi) north of Będzino, 15 km (9 mi) north-west of Koszalin, and 130 km (81 mi) north-east of the regional capital Szczecin.

For the history of the region, see History of Pomerania.
