= Strachomino =

- Village
- Location within Poland
- Coordinates: 54°10′1″N 15°50′25″E
- Country: Poland
- Voivodeship: West Pomeranian
- County: Koszalin
- Gmina: Będzino

Strachomino [straxɔˈminɔ] (German: Strachmin) is a village in the administrative district of Gmina Będzino, within Koszalin County, West Pomeranian Voivodeship, in north-western Poland. It lies approximately 11 km (7 mi) south-west of Będzino, 23 km (14 mi) west of Koszalin, and 118 km (73 mi) north-east of the regional capital Szczecin.

For the history of the region, see History of Pomerania.
