= Strzeżnice =

- Village
- Location within Poland
- Coordinates: 54°14′29″N 16°4′23″E
- Country: Poland
- Voivodeship: West Pomeranian
- County: Koszalin
- Gmina: Będzino
- Population: 80

Strzeżnice [stʂɛʐˈnit͡sɛ] is a village in the administrative district of Gmina Będzino, within Koszalin County, West Pomeranian Voivodeship, in north-western Poland. It lies approximately 7 km (4 mi) north-east of Będzino, 10 km (6 mi) north-west of Koszalin, and 134 km (83 mi) north-east of the regional capital Szczecin.

For the history of the region, see History of Pomerania.

The village has a population of 80.
