= Wiciąże Pierwsze =

- Settlement
- Location within Poland
- Coordinates: 54°11′37″N 15°49′49″E
- Country: Poland
- Voivodeship: West Pomeranian
- County: Koszalin
- Gmina: Będzino

Wiciąże Pierwsze [viˈt͡ɕɔ̃ʐɛ ˈpjɛrfʂɛ] (German: Ritterland) is a settlement in the administrative district of Gmina Będzino, within Koszalin County, West Pomeranian Voivodeship, in north-western Poland. It lies approximately 11 km (7 mi) west of Będzino, 24 km (15 mi) west of Koszalin, and 119 km (74 mi) north-east of the regional capital Szczecin.

For the history of the region, see History of Pomerania.
