= Barnin, Poland =

Barnin
- Village
- Location within Poland
- Coordinates: 54°13′55″N 15°58′53″E
- Country: Poland
- Voivodeship: West Pomeranian
- County: Koszalin
- Gmina: Będzino

Barnin [ˈbarnin], German: Barning, is a village in the administrative district of Gmina Będzino, within Koszalin County, West Pomeranian Voivodeship, in north-western Poland. It lies approximately 3 km (2 mi) north of Będzino, 15 km (9 mi) west of Koszalin, and 129 km (80 mi) north-east of the regional capital Szczecin.

For the history of the region, see History of Pomerania.
