= Borkowice, West Pomeranian Voivodeship =

Borkowice
- Village
- Location within Poland
- Coordinates: 54°12′31″N 15°54′26″E
- Country: Poland
- Voivodeship: West Pomeranian
- County: Koszalin
- Gmina: Będzino

Borkowice [bɔrkɔˈvit͡sɛ] is a village in the administrative district of Gmina Będzino, within Koszalin County, West Pomeranian Voivodeship, in north-western Poland. It lies approximately 6 km (4 mi) west of Będzino, 19 km (12 mi) west of Koszalin, and 124 km (77 mi) north-east of the regional capital Szczecin.

For the history of the region, see History of Pomerania.
