= Tymień Wind Farm =

Wind farm in Poland

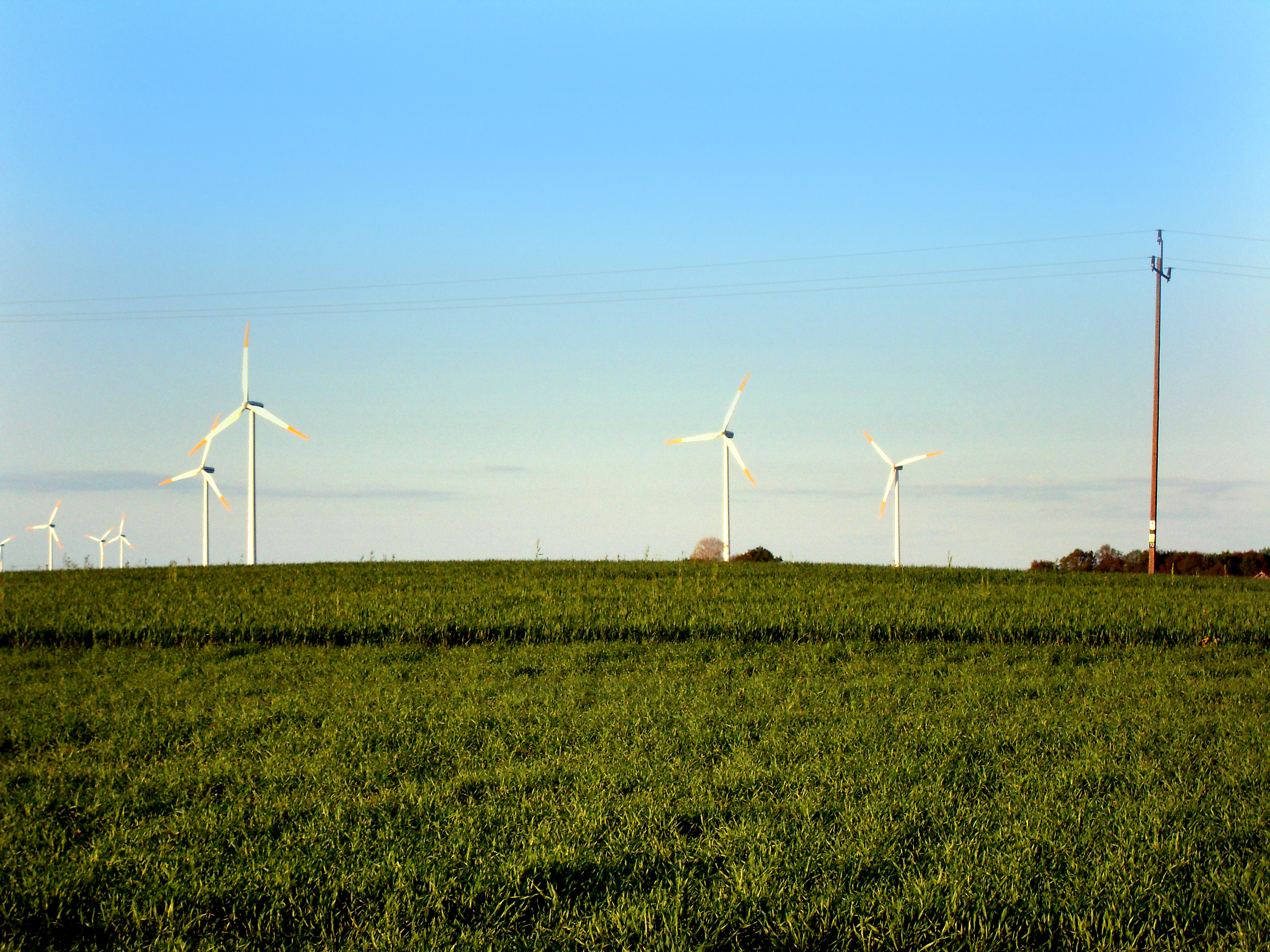
- Official name: Park Wiatrowy Tymień
- Country: Poland
- Location: Tymień, West Pomeranian Voivodeship
- Coordinates: 54°12′02″N 15°51′08″E
- Status: Operational
- Commission date: 2005
- Owner: Energa
- Operator: Koszalin Power Plant

External links
- Commons: Related media on Commons

The Tymień Wind Farm is a group of wind turbines located in the vicinity of Tymień, West Pomeranian Voivodeship near Kołobrzeg, in Koszalin County.

The investment cost amounted to PLN 235 million zł. The recipient of energy is Koszalin Power Plant forming part of the group Energa. Built in 2006, by 2008 it was the largest wind farm in the country, with power up to 50 MW, higher than the open in 2003 wind farm in Zagórze near Wolin 30 MW. Currently, the largest wind park in Poland is the Margonin wind farm of 120 MW (60 wind turbines, each with a capacity of 2.0 MW), developed by the company Neolica Poland Sp. z oo owned by Energias de Portugal (EdP).

== Specifications ==
- Number of wind turbines: 25
- Capacity of 50 MW
- Turbines: Vestas V80 with a capacity of 2.0 MW each
- Column height of 100 m
- Rotor diameter of 80 m
- Reception: Energa by a transformer station 20/110 kV Tymien and 110 kV line Tymień- Dunowo

== See also ==
- List of power stations in Poland
