= Miłogoszcz, Koszalin County =

Miłogoszcz
- Village
- Location within Poland
- Coordinates: 54°11′54″N 15°53′51″E
- Country: Poland
- Voivodeship: West Pomeranian
- County: Koszalin
- Gmina: Będzino

Miłogoszcz [miˈwɔɡɔʂt͡ʂ] (German: Hohenfelde) is a village in the administrative district of Gmina Będzino, within Koszalin County, West Pomeranian Voivodeship, in north-western Poland. It lies approximately 8 km (5 mi) west of Będzino, 20 km (12 mi) west of Koszalin, and 121 km (75 mi) north-east of the regional capital Szczecin.

For the history of the region, see History of Pomerania.
