= Podbórz, West Pomeranian Voivodeship =

Podbórz
- Settlement
- Location within Poland
- Coordinates: 54°9′6″N 15°55′11″E
- Country: Poland
- Voivodeship: West Pomeranian
- County: Koszalin
- Gmina: Będzino

Podbórz [ˈpɔdbuʂ] (German: Falkenburg) is a settlement in the administrative district of Gmina Będzino, within Koszalin County, West Pomeranian Voivodeship, in north-western Poland. It lies approximately 8 km (5 mi) south-west of Będzino, 18 km (11 mi) west of Koszalin, and 120 km (75 mi) north-east of the regional capital Szczecin.

For the history of the region, see History of Pomerania.
