= Dobre, West Pomeranian Voivodeship =

Dobre
- Village
- Location within Poland
- Coordinates: 54°12′10″N 16°3′7″E
- Country: Poland
- Voivodeship: West Pomeranian
- County: Koszalin
- Gmina: Będzino

Dobre [ˈdɔbrɛ] (German: Todenhagen) is a village in the administrative district of Gmina Będzino, within Koszalin County, West Pomeranian Voivodeship, in north-western Poland. It lies approximately 5 km (3 mi) east of Będzino, 9 km (6 mi) west of Koszalin, and 131 km (81 mi) north-east of the regional capital Szczecin.

For the history of the region, see History of Pomerania.
