= Świercz =

- Settlement
- Location within Poland
- Coordinates: 54°12′15″N 16°4′25″E
- Country: Poland
- Voivodeship: West Pomeranian
- County: Koszalin
- Gmina: Będzino

Świercz (Polish pronunciation: [ɕfjɛrt͡ʂ]) is a settlement in the administrative district of Gmina Będzino, within Koszalin County, West Pomeranian Voivodeship, in north-western Poland. It lies approximately 6 km (4 mi) east of Będzino, 8 km (5 mi) west of Koszalin, and 132 km (82 mi) north-east of the regional capital Szczecin.

For the history of the region, see History of Pomerania.
