= Stoislaw =

Stoislaw may refer to:

- Stoislaw I, a Slavic prince of Rügen
- Stoisław, West Pomeranian Voivodeship
