= Łopienica =

- Village
- Location within Poland
- Coordinates: 54°12′39″N 15°49′28″E
- Country: Poland
- Voivodeship: West Pomeranian
- County: Koszalin
- Gmina: Będzino
- Population: 120

Łopienica [wɔpjɛˈnit͡sa] (German: Lappenhagen) is a village in the administrative district of Gmina Będzino, within Koszalin County, West Pomeranian Voivodeship, in north-western Poland. It lies approximately 11 km (7 mi) west of Będzino, 24 km (15 mi) west of Koszalin, and 121 km (75 mi) north-east of the regional capital Szczecin.

For the history of the region, see History of Pomerania.

The village has a population of 120.
