= Lekno =

Lekno may refer to the following places in Poland:

- Łękno, a neighbourhood of the city of Szczecin, north-west Poland.
- Łekno, Pomeranian Voivodeship
- Łekno, Greater Poland Voivodeship
- Łękno, Greater Poland Voivodeship
- Łękno, Koszalin County in West Pomeranian Voivodeship
