= Przybyradz, Koszalin County =

Przybyradz
- Settlement
- Location within Poland
- Coordinates: 54°12′22″N 16°9′30″E
- Country: Poland
- Voivodeship: West Pomeranian
- County: Koszalin
- Gmina: Będzino

Przybyradz [pʂɨˈbɨrat͡s] is a settlement in the administrative district of Gmina Będzino, within Koszalin County, West Pomeranian Voivodeship, in north-western Poland. It lies approximately 11 km (7 mi) east of Będzino, 4 km (2 mi) north-west of Koszalin, and 136 km (85 mi) north-east of the regional capital Szczecin.

For the history of the region, see History of Pomerania.
