= Smolne, West Pomeranian Voivodeship =

Smolne
- Village
- Location within Poland
- Coordinates: 54°9′6″N 15°54′14″E
- Country: Poland
- Voivodeship: West Pomeranian
- County: Koszalin
- Gmina: Będzino

Smolne [ˈsmɔlnɛ] (German: Schmollenhagen) is a village in the administrative district of Gmina Będzino, within Koszalin County, West Pomeranian Voivodeship, in north-western Poland. It lies approximately 9 km (6 mi) south-west of Będzino, 19 km (12 mi) west of Koszalin, and 120 km (75 mi) north-east of the regional capital Szczecin.

For the history of the region, see History of Pomerania.
