= Malinowo, West Pomeranian Voivodeship =

Malinowo
- Village
- Location within Poland
- Coordinates: 54°12′18″N 16°06′00″E
- Country: Poland
- Voivodeship: West Pomeranian
- County: Koszalin
- Gmina: Będzino

Malinowo is a village in the administrative district of Gmina Będzino, within Koszalin County, West Pomeranian Voivodeship, in north-western Poland.
