= Pakosław, West Pomeranian Voivodeship =

Pakosław
- Settlement
- Location within Poland
- Coordinates: 54°11′35″N 16°1′9″E
- Country: Poland
- Voivodeship: West Pomeranian
- County: Koszalin
- Gmina: Będzino

Pakosław [paˈkɔswaf] (German: Pagelsdorf) is a settlement in the administrative district of Gmina Będzino, within Koszalin County, West Pomeranian Voivodeship, in north-western Poland. It lies approximately 3 km (2 mi) south-east of Będzino, 11 km (7 mi) west of Koszalin, and 128 km (80 mi) north-east of the regional capital Szczecin.

For the history of the region, see History of Pomerania.
