= Radomno (Dobiesławiec) =

- Village
- Location within Poland
- Coordinates: 54°14′06″N 16°07′47″E
- Country: Poland
- Voivodeship: West Pomeranian
- County: Koszalin
- Gmina: Będzino

Radomno is a village in the administrative district of Gmina Będzino, within Koszalin County, West Pomeranian Voivodeship, in north-western Poland.
