= Łubniki, West Pomeranian Voivodeship =

Łubniki
- Settlement
- Location within Poland
- Coordinates: 54°12′48″N 16°0′1″E
- Country: Poland
- Voivodeship: West Pomeranian
- County: Koszalin
- Gmina: Będzino

Łubniki [wubˈniki] (German: Lebeckenhof) is a settlement in the administrative district of Gmina Będzino, within Koszalin County, West Pomeranian Voivodeship, in north-western Poland. It lies approximately 13 km (8 mi) west of Koszalin and 129 km (80 mi) north-east of the regional capital Szczecin.

For the history of the region, see History of Pomerania.
