= Łekno, Koszalin County =

Łekno
- Village
- Location within Poland
- Coordinates: 54°12′47″N 16°0′55″E
- Country: Poland
- Voivodeship: West Pomeranian
- County: Koszalin
- Gmina: Będzino

Łekno [ˈwɛknɔ] (German: Bast) is a village in the administrative district of Gmina Będzino, within Koszalin County, West Pomeranian Voivodeship, in north-western Poland. It lies approximately 2 km (1 mi) east of Będzino, 12 km (7 mi) west of Koszalin, and 130 km (81 mi) north-east of the regional capital Szczecin.

For the history of the region, see History of Pomerania.
