= Tymień, West Pomeranian Voivodeship =

Tymień
- Village
- Location within Poland
- Coordinates: 54°12′2″N 15°51′8″E
- Country: Poland
- Voivodeship: West Pomeranian
- County: Koszalin
- Gmina: Będzino
- Population: 950

Tymień [ˈtɨmjɛɲ] (German: Timmenhagen) is a village in the administrative district of Gmina Będzino, within Koszalin County, West Pomeranian Voivodeship, in north-western Poland. It lies approximately 10 km (6 mi) west of Będzino, 22 km (14 mi) west of Koszalin, and 121 km (75 mi) north-east of the regional capital Szczecin.

At Tymień, there is a large wind park with 25 wind turbines.

The village has a population of 950.
