= Stoisław, West Pomeranian Voivodeship =

Stoisław
- Village
- Location within Poland
- Coordinates: 54°12′51″N 16°4′31″E
- Country: Poland
- Voivodeship: West Pomeranian
- County: Koszalin
- Gmina: Będzino
- Population: 570

Stoisław [ˈstɔi̯swaf] (German: Karlshof) is a village in the administrative district of Gmina Będzino, within Koszalin County, West Pomeranian Voivodeship, in north-western Poland. It lies approximately 6 km (4 mi) east of Będzino, 8 km (5 mi) north-west of Koszalin, and 133 km (83 mi) north-east of the regional capital Szczecin.

For the history of the region, see History of Pomerania.

The village has a population of 570.
