= Kiszkowo, West Pomeranian Voivodeship =

Kiszkowo
- Village
- Location within Poland
- Coordinates: 54°13′42″N 15°55′43″E
- Country: Poland
- Voivodeship: West Pomeranian
- County: Koszalin
- Gmina: Będzino

Kiszkowo [kiʂˈkɔvɔ] (German: Kiepersdorf) is a village in the administrative district of Gmina Będzino, within Koszalin County, West Pomeranian Voivodeship, in north-western Poland.

For the history of the region, see History of Pomerania.
