= Łasin Koszaliński =

- Village
- Location within Poland
- Coordinates: 54°13′13″N 15°48′37″E
- Country: Poland
- Voivodeship: West Pomeranian
- County: Koszalin
- Gmina: Będzino
- Elevation: 10 m (33 ft)
- Population: 60

Łasin Koszaliński [ˈwaɕin kɔʂaˈliɲski] (German: Lassehne) is a village in the administrative district of Gmina Będzino, within Koszalin County, West Pomeranian Voivodeship, in north-western Poland. It lies approximately 12 km (7 mi) west of Będzino, 25 km (16 mi) west of Koszalin, and 121 km (75 mi) north-east of the regional capital Szczecin.

For the history of the region, see History of Pomerania.

The village has a population of 60.
