= Elisabeth von Rhade =

Prussian noblewoman and wife of Japanese diplomat Aoki Shūzō

- Viscountess Aoki
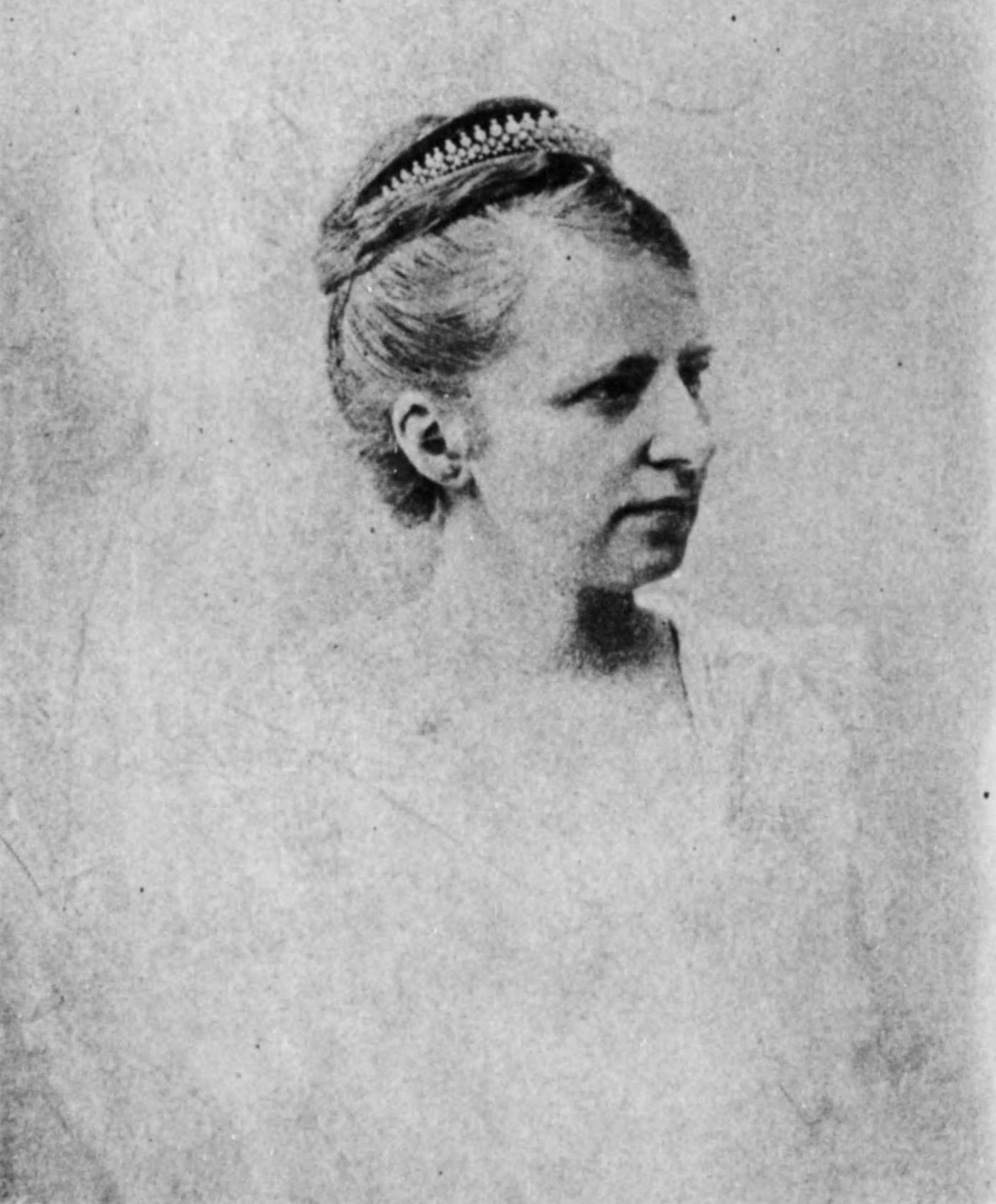
- Portrait of Elisabeth von Rhade (before 1899)
- Born: Elisabeth Henriette Margarethe von Rhade; 13 January 1849; Strippow, Kingdom of Prussia
- Died: 5 April 1931 (aged 82); Munich, Weimar Republic
- Noble family: House of Rhade (by birth); House of Aoki (by marriage)
- Spouse: Aoki Shūzō (m. 1877; died 1914)
- Issue: Hanna Aoki
- Father: Albert von Rhade
- Mother: Clementine von Blanckenburg

Elisabeth von Rhade (13 January 1849 – 5 April 1931), later known after her marriage as Elisabeth Aoki (Japanese; 青木 エリザベート) was a Prussian noblewoman best known as the wife of the prominent Meiji-era Japanese diplomat and Foreign Minister, Aoki Shūzō.

== Early life ==
Elisabeth von Rhade was born on 13 January 1849 in Strippow, a rural village in the Pomerania province of the Kingdom of Prussia (modern-day Strzepowo, Poland). She was the daughter of Albert von Rhade (1818–1868) and Clementine von Blanckenburg (1829–1915), descending from the ancestral Prussian land-owning nobility (Uradel).

Unlike many contemporary Prussian noble families of the era who maintained prominent military careers or residences in the capital city of Berlin, Elisabeth was raised in the isolated countryside of Pomerania; her family managed a modest agricultural estate rather than a grand palace, anchoring her youth to rural estate management before her introduction to international society. Following the unexpected death of her father in 1868, her early adulthood was marked by the responsibility of assisting her mother in maintaining the family property until her relocation and subsequent historic marriage in 1877.

== Meeting and marriage ==
In the mid-1870s, Elisabeth von Rhade met Japanese diplomat Aoki Shūzō in Berlin. To pursue the relationship, Aoki divorced his first Japanese wife, causing considerable social controversy.

The proposed cross-cultural union faced strict opposition due to European racial barriers and Meiji government regulations prohibiting senior state officials from marrying foreigners. Aoki used political leverage through Inoue Kaoru to secure a special imperial dispensation from the Meiji court. To avoid public backlash from the Berlin conservative elite, the couple married in the port city of Bremen on 20 April 1877. It was one of the earliest legal marriages between a European noblewoman and a Japanese diplomat.

=== Issue ===
- Hanna Aoki (16 December 1879 – 24 June 1953); married German diplomat Count Alexander von Hatzfeldt-Trachenberg in Tokyo on 20 April 1904 and had one daughter.

== Legacy ==
In 1888, Elisabeth's husband, Aoki Shūzō, commissioned the construction of a grand European-style country estate known as the Former Aoki Family Nasu Villa in Nasu, Tochigi Prefecture, Japan. The villa, built using traditional German architectural frameworks to honor Elisabeth's Prussian heritage, was designated as an Important Cultural Property of Japan in 1999.

== See also ==
- Germany–Japan relations
