= Kazimierz Pomorski =

- Village
- Location within Poland
- Coordinates: 54°13′23″N 16°1′32″E
- Country: Poland
- Voivodeship: West Pomeranian
- County: Koszalin
- Gmina: Będzino

Kazimierz Pomorski (Polish: [kaˈʑimjɛʂ pɔˈmɔrskʲi]; German: Kasimirsburg) is a village in the administrative district of Gmina Będzino, within Koszalin County, West Pomeranian Voivodeship, in north-western Poland. It lies approximately 3 km (2 mi) north-east of Będzino, 12 km (7 mi) north-west of Koszalin, and 131 km (81 mi) north-east of the regional capital Szczecin.

For the history of the region, see History of Pomerania.
