= Komory, West Pomeranian Voivodeship =

Komory
- Village
- Location within Poland
- Coordinates: 54°11′51″N 15°57′53″E
- Country: Poland
- Voivodeship: West Pomeranian
- County: Koszalin
- Gmina: Będzino

Komory [kɔˈmɔrɨ] (German: Kiefstücken) is a village in the administrative district of Gmina Będzino, within Koszalin County, West Pomeranian Voivodeship, in north-western Poland.

For the history of the region, see History of Pomerania.
