= Büchenbronn Observation Tower =

Coordinates: 48°50′36″N 8°38′29″E

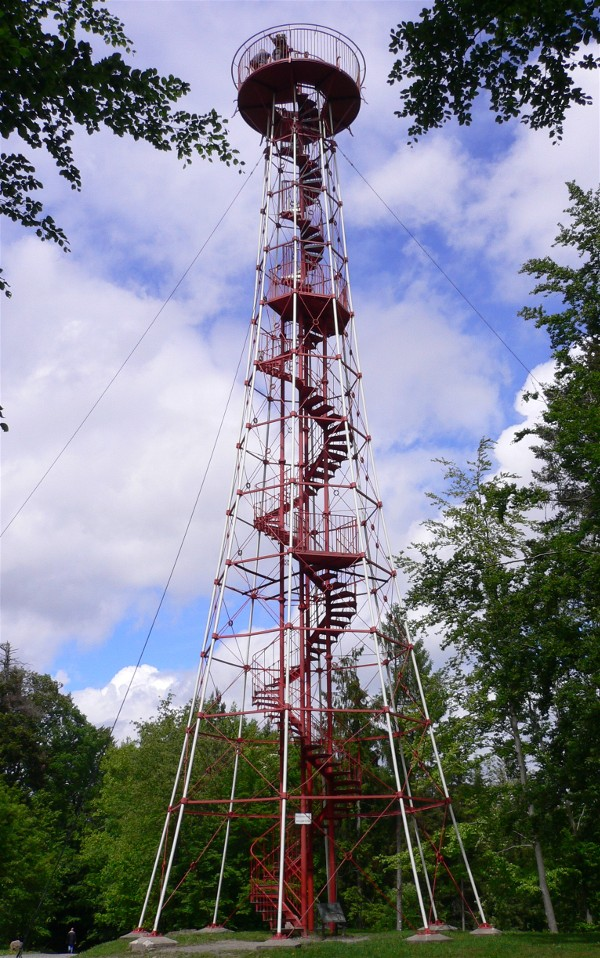
Büchenbronn Observation Tower

Büchenbronn Observation Tower (German: Büchenbronner Aussichtsturm) is a lattice tower situated on the Büchenbronn Height (608.50 above sea level) near Pforzheim in the state of Baden-Württemberg, south-west Germany.

== Structure ==
The tower was built in 1883 for the Society for the Beautification of Pforzheim (Verschönerungsverein Pforzheim) as an octagonal cast-iron tubing skeleton structure made from iron girders and pipes by the Louis Kühne Company of Dresden. The tower height is 24.75 meters (81.2 feet) and the top can be reached by climbing over 125 steps on a spiral staircase in the tower center winding around four pipes in the square. On the matter of stability, the Deutsche Bauzeitung wrote in 1885 that "...the tower can easily be shifted into rather large fluctuations by only one visitor."

The tower belonged to the Society until 1933, then to the Black Forest Association until 1974, since when it has been the property of the city of Pforzheim. The last renovation took place after the "Lothar" storm of 25 December 1999.

== See also ==
- List of towers

== Printed sources ==
- Dieter Buck: Aussichtsziele im Ländle. Wandern, Entdecken, Erleben. Silberburg-Verlag, Tübingen 2004, ISBN 3-87407-626-1, S. 45 ff.
- Joachim Kleinmanns: Schau ins Land. Aussichtstürme. Jonas, Marburg 1999, ISBN 3-89445-252-8.
