= Mrzlica =

- Location in Slovenia
- Coordinates: 46°9′36″N 14°46′32″E
- Country: Slovenia
- Traditional region: Upper Carniola
- Statistical region: Central Slovenia
- Municipality: Moravče
- Elevation: 755 m (2,477 ft)

Mrzlica (Slovene pronunciation: [ˈməɾzlitsa], sometimes Zmrzlica, in older sources also Mrzovec) is a former settlement in the Municipality of Moravče in central Slovenia. It is now part of the village of Limbarska Gora. The area is part of the traditional region of Upper Carniola. The municipality is now included in the Central Slovenia Statistical Region.

== Geography ==
Mrzlica lies in the northern part of the village of Limbarska Gora, at the crest of the hill ascending to the main settlement.

== History ==
Mrzlica had a population of 15 living in two houses in 1900. Mrzlica was annexed by Limbarska Gora (at that time still called Sveti Valentin) in 1952, ending its existence as an independent settlement.
