= Sendeturm Dobratsch =

Radio tower on Dobratsch mountain in Austria

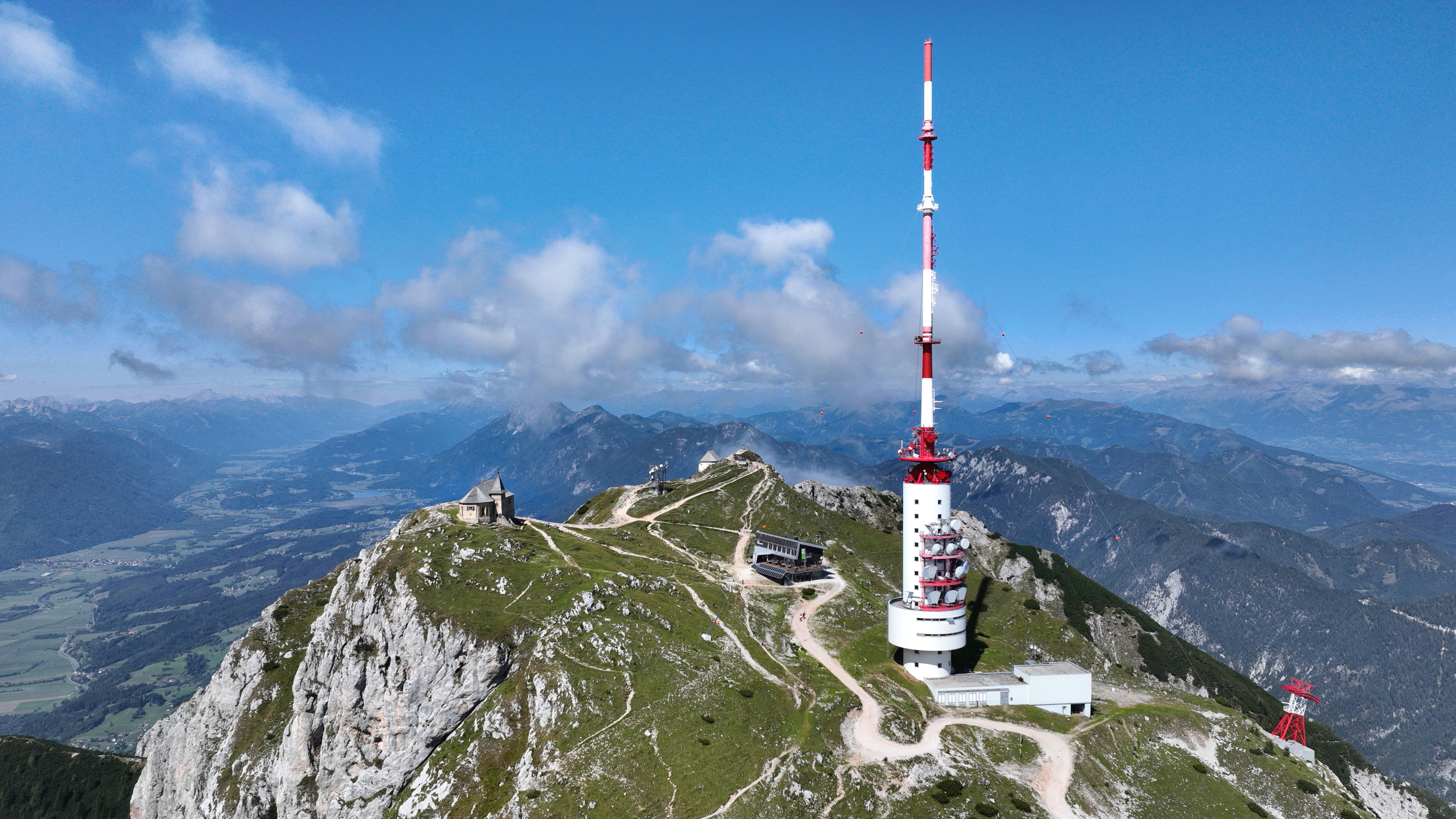
- Interactive map of the Sendeturm Dobratsch area

General information
- Status: Completed
- Type: Partially guyed tower
- Architectural style: Modernism
- Location: Mt. Dobratsch; Bad Bleiberg, Austria
- Coordinates: 46°36′11″N 13°40′23″E
- Construction started: 1969
- Completed: 15 October 1971
- Owner: Österreichische Rundfunksender GmbH

Height
- Antenna spire: 165 m (541 ft)

The Sendeturm Dobratsch (Dobratsch Transmitter Tower) is a radio tower on the Dobratsch mountain, the easternmost peak of the Gailtal Alps near Villach in Carinthia, Austria.

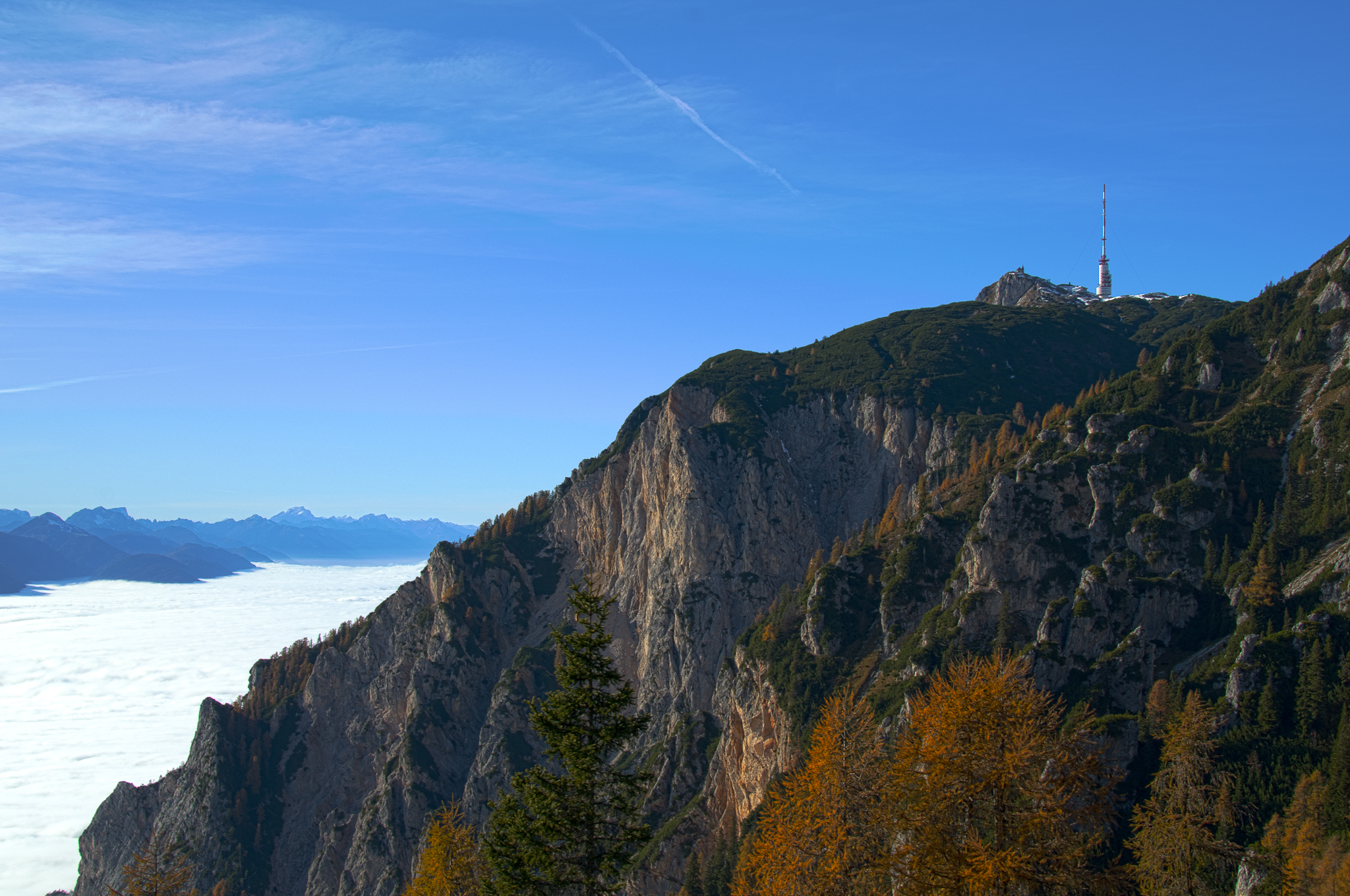
Dobratsch summit

The transmitter was built in 1971 and succeeded a provisional facility on the lower Pyramidenkogel mountain near Klagenfurt. It consists of a concrete tower which carries a guyed steel tube mast on the top, similar to the Gerbrandy Tower in the Netherlands. The tower is located at an altitude of 2,115 m (6,939 ft) above sea-level, its total height is 165 metres (541 ft). The transmission facility can be reached by a private cable car from Bad Bleiberg.

The Dobratsch Transmitter Tower is used for directional radio services and FM broadcasting as well as for DVB-T transmission of several TV programmes. 125,000 watts ERP make it the strongest transmitter of Austria. It supplies virtually the entire state of Carinthia as well as adjacent regions in Styria, Italy (Friuli-Venezia Giulia) and Slovenia (Upper Carniola).

== See also ==
- List of towers
- List of masts
