= Višňová (Jindřichův Hradec District) =

- Municipality
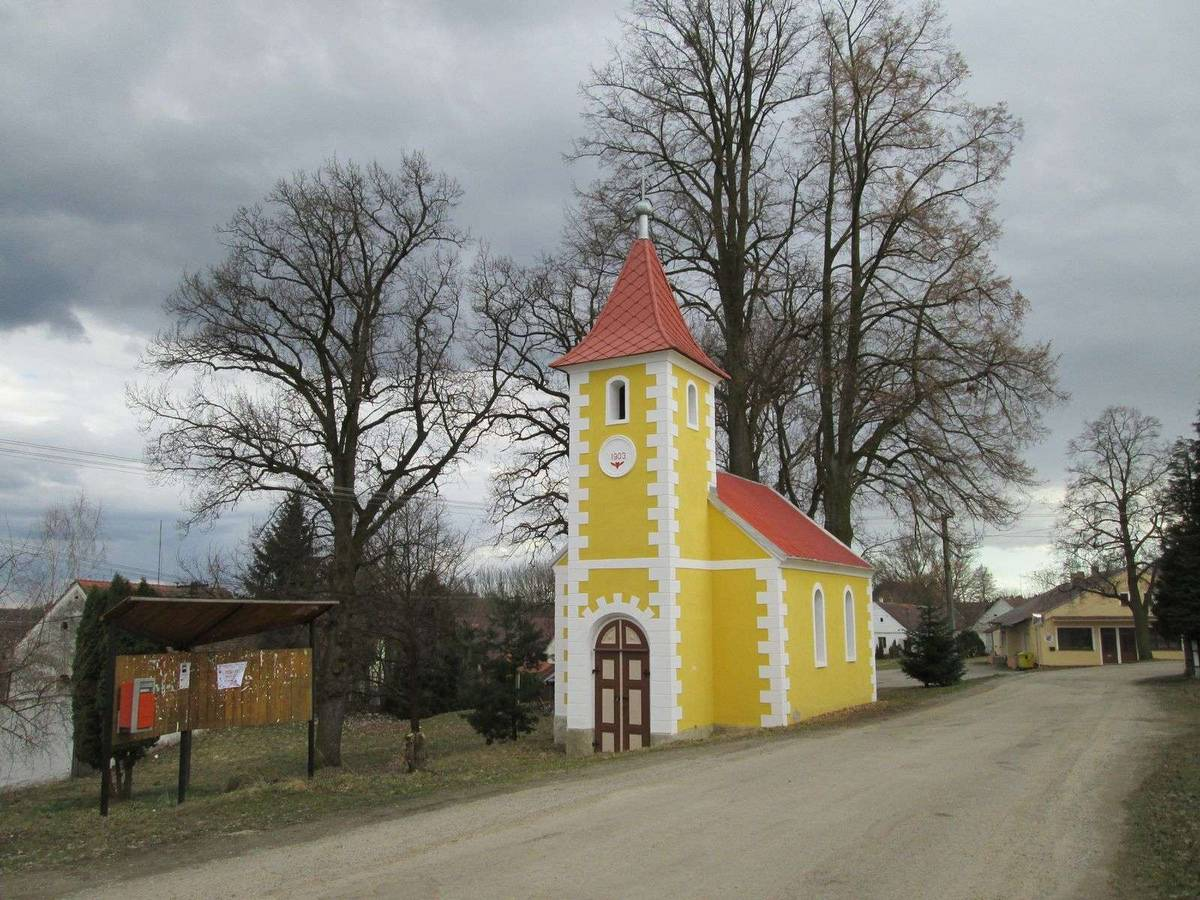
- Chapel of Saint Paul

- Location in the Czech Republic
- Coordinates: 49°13′9″N 14°50′29″E
- Country: Czech Republic
- Region: South Bohemian
- District: Jindřichův Hradec
- First mentioned: 1340

Area
  - Total: 5.78 km^{2} (2.23 sq mi)
- Elevation: 478 m (1,568 ft)

Population (2026-01-01)
  - Total: 100
  - Density: 17/km^{2} (45/sq mi)
- Time zone: UTC+1 (CET)
  - Summer (DST): UTC+2 (CEST)
- Postal code: 378 21
- Website: www.obecvisnova.cz

Višňová is a municipality and village in Jindřichův Hradec District in the South Bohemian Region of the Czech Republic. It has about 100 inhabitants.

Višňová lies approximately 14 kilometres (9 mi) north-west of Jindřichův Hradec, 38 km (24 mi) north-east of České Budějovice, and 102 km (63 mi) south of Prague.

== Etymology ==
The word višňová is an adjective derived from the Czech word višeň, i.e. 'sour cherry'.

== Demographics ==
Historical population
| Year | Pop. | ±% |
|---|---|---|
| 1869 | 270 | — |
| 1880 | 231 | −14.4% |
| 1890 | 266 | +15.2% |
| 1900 | 268 | +0.8% |
| 1910 | 251 | −6.3% |
| 1921 | 251 | +0.0% |
| 1930 | 257 | +2.4% |
| 1950 | 174 | −32.3% |
| 1961 | 169 | −2.9% |
| 1970 | 144 | −14.8% |
| 1980 | 105 | −27.1% |
| 1991 | 85 | −19.0% |
| 2001 | 77 | −9.4% |
| 2011 | 70 | −9.1% |
| 2021 | 100 | +42.9% |
Source: Censuses
