= Kladno (Chrudim District) =

- Municipality
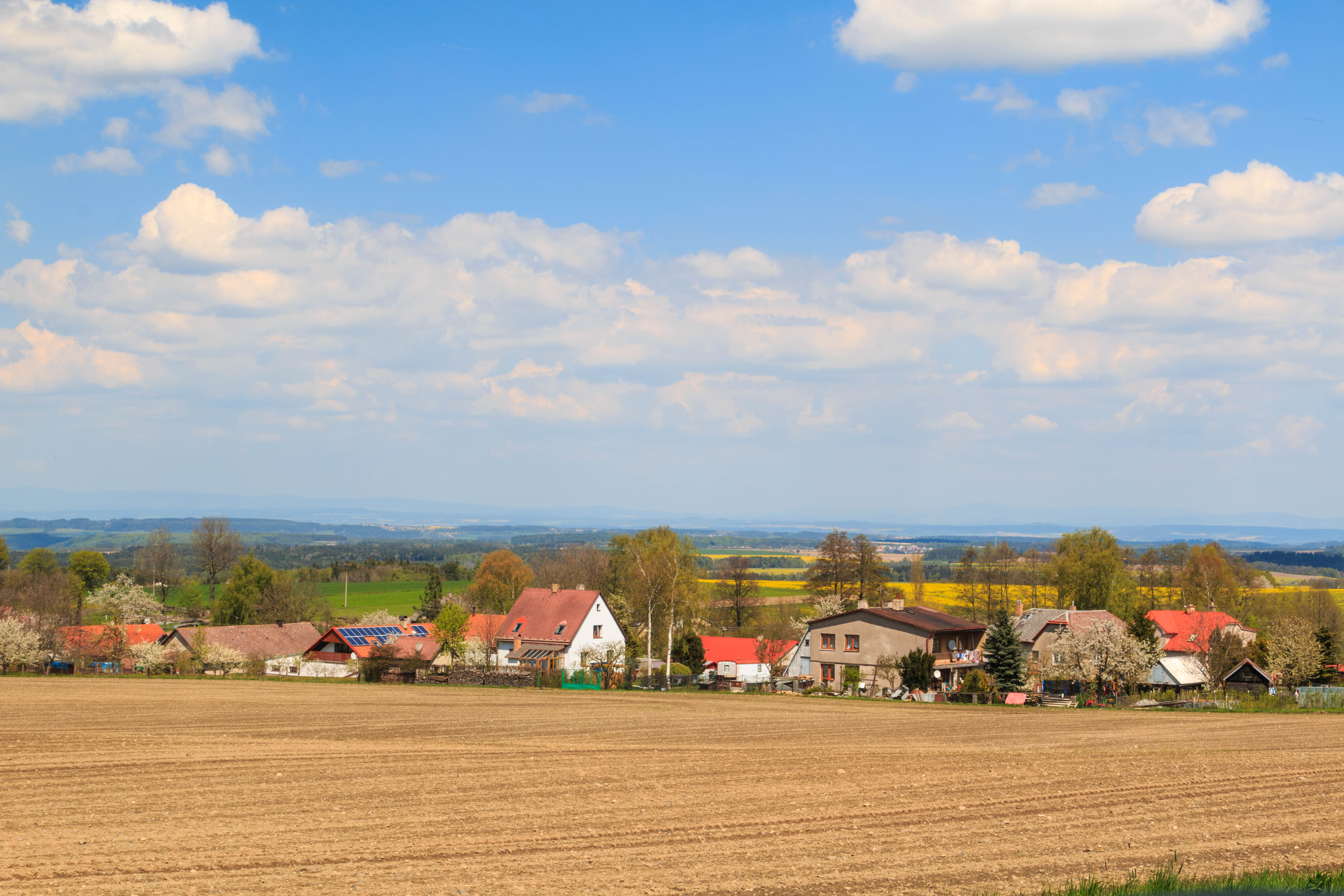
- General view

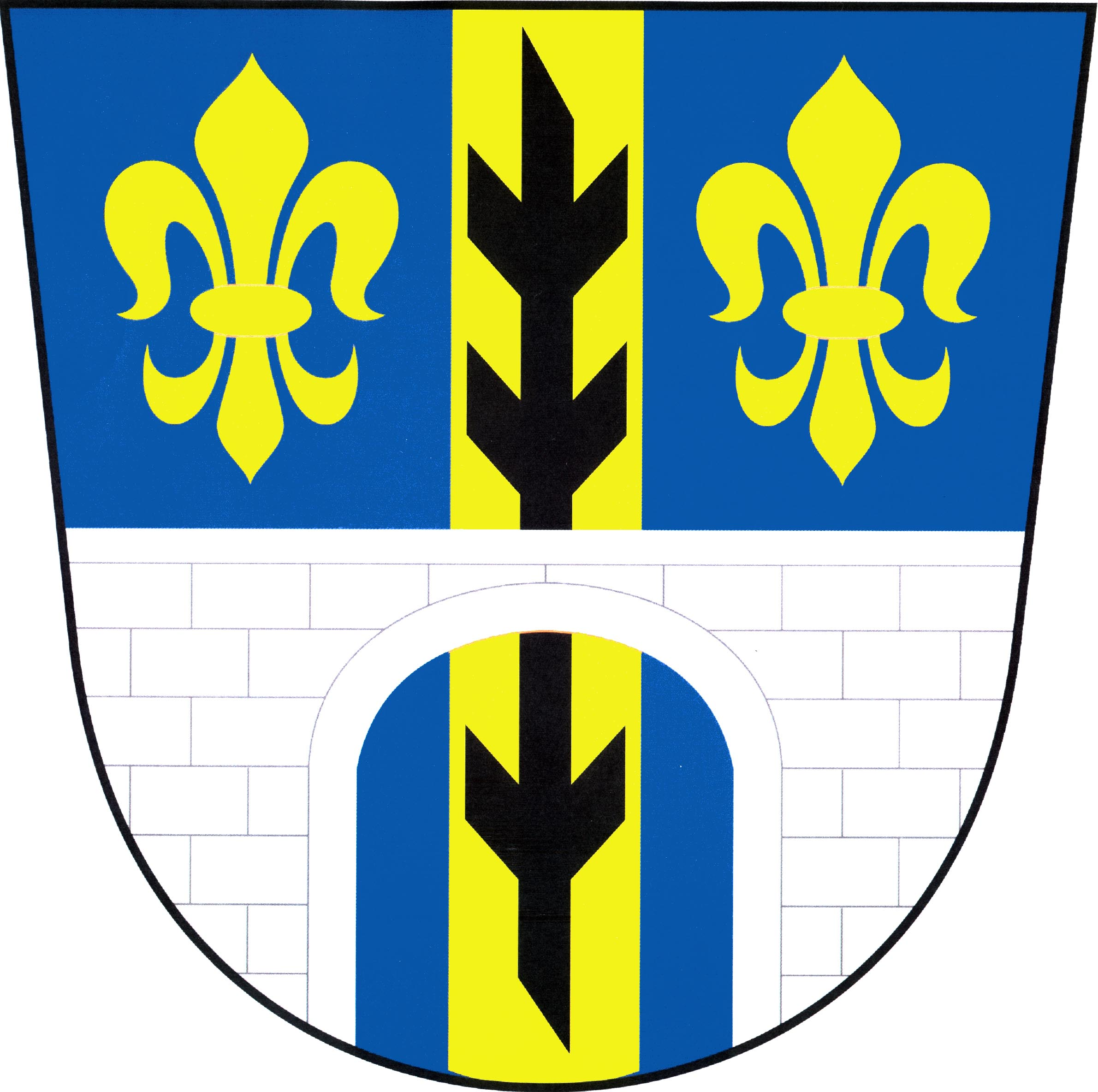
- Flag Coat of arms

- Location in the Czech Republic
- Coordinates: 49°46′21″N 15°58′56″E
- Country: Czech Republic
- Region: Pardubice
- District: Chrudim
- First mentioned: 1392

Area
  - Total: 4.26 km^{2} (1.64 sq mi)
- Elevation: 601 m (1,972 ft)

Population (2026-01-01)
  - Total: 235
  - Density: 55.2/km^{2} (143/sq mi)
- Time zone: UTC+1 (CET)
  - Summer (DST): UTC+2 (CEST)
- Postal code: 539 01
- Website: www.obec-kladno.cz

Kladno is a municipality and village in Chrudim District in the Pardubice Region of the Czech Republic. It has about 200 inhabitants.

== Demographics ==
Historical population
Year	Pop.	±%
1869	357	—
1880	389	+9.0%
1890	366	−5.9%
1900	384	+4.9%
1910	418	+8.9%
1921	382	−8.6%
1930	419	+9.7%
1950	337	−19.6%
1961	362	+7.4%
1970	324	−10.5%
1980	306	−5.6%
1991	268	−12.4%
2001	262	−2.2%
2011	245	−6.5%
2021	249	+1.6%
Source: Censuses
