= Strzepowo =

- Village
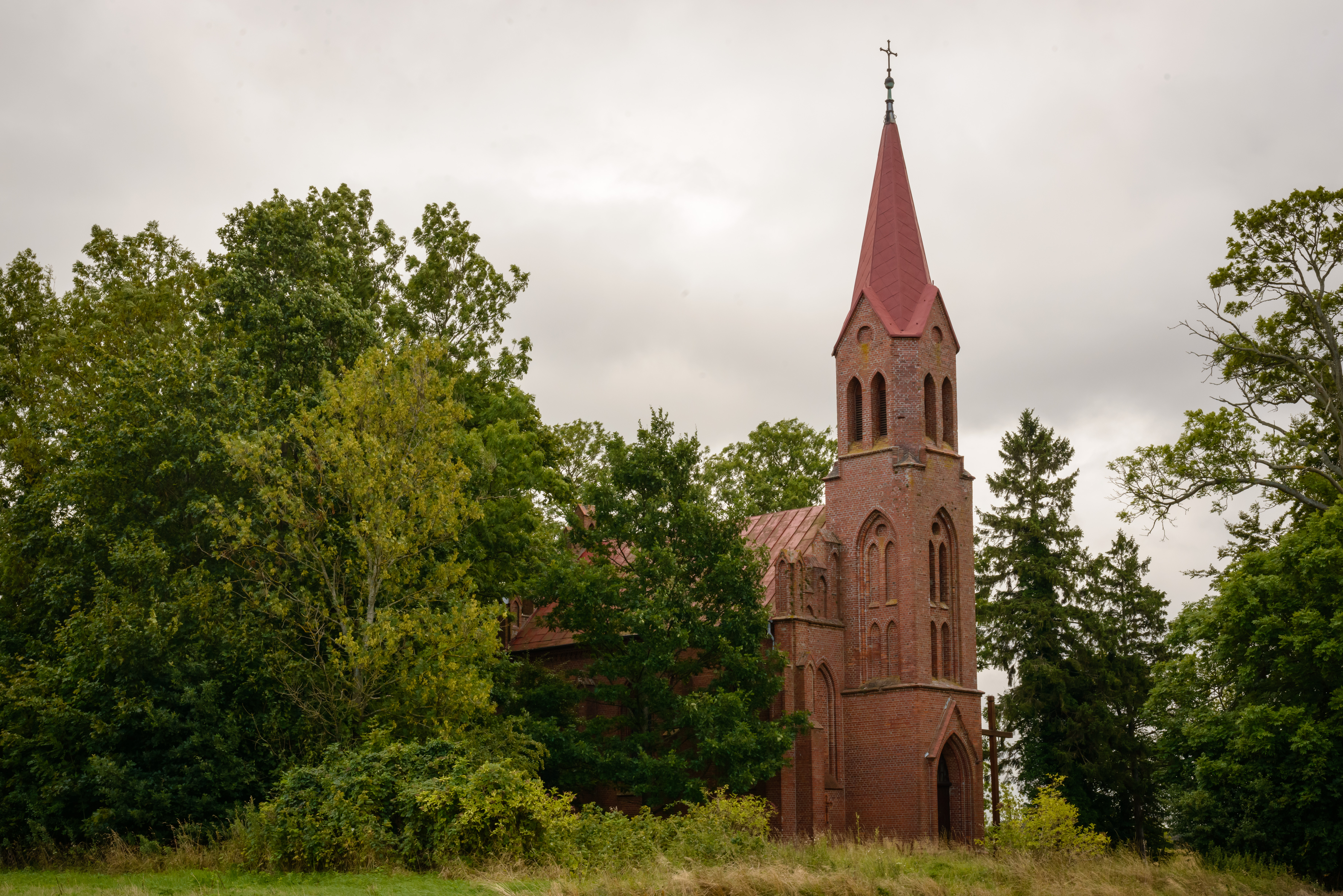
- Saint Andrew Bobola church in Strzepowo

- Location within Poland
- Coordinates: 54°10′22″N 15°52′26″E
- Country: Poland
- Voivodeship: West Pomeranian
- County: Koszalin
- Gmina: Będzino
- Time zone: UTC+1 (CET)
  - Summer (DST): UTC+2 (CEST)
- Vehicle registration: ZKO

Strzepowo [stʂɛˈpɔvɔ] is a village in the administrative district of Gmina Będzino, within Koszalin County, West Pomeranian Voivodeship, in north-western Poland. It lies approximately 9 km (6 mi) south-west of Będzino, 21 km (13 mi) west of Koszalin, and 120 km (75 mi) north-east of the regional capital Szczecin.

It is located in the historic region of Pomerania.
