= Kładno =

- Village
- Location within Poland
- Coordinates: 54°12′50″N 15°50′49″E
- Country: Poland
- Voivodeship: West Pomeranian
- County: Koszalin
- Gmina: Będzino

Kładno [ˈkwadnɔ] (German: Kaltenhagen) is a village in the administrative district of Gmina Będzino, within Koszalin County, West Pomeranian Voivodeship, in north-western Poland. It lies approximately 10 km (6 mi) west of Będzino, 23 km (14 mi) west of Koszalin, and 122 km (76 mi) north-east of the regional capital Szczecin.
