= Smolne, Pomeranian Voivodeship =

Smolne
- Settlement
- Location within Poland
- Coordinates: 53°57′39″N 17°16′18″E
- Country: Poland
- Voivodeship: Pomeranian
- County: Bytów
- Gmina: Lipnica
- Population: 13

Smolne [ˈsmɔlnɛ] is a settlement in the administrative district of Gmina Lipnica, within Bytów County, Pomeranian Voivodeship, in northern Poland.

For details of the history of the region, see History of Pomerania.
