= Gmina Będzino =

Gmina Będzino Będzino Commune
- Gmina
- Coat of arms
- Interactive map of Gmina Będzino
- Coordinates (Będzino): 54°12′31″N 15°59′25″E
- Country: Poland
- Voivodeship: West Pomeranian
- County: Koszalin County
- Seat: Będzino

Area
  - Total: 180.92 km^{2} (69.85 sq mi)

Population (2006)
  - Total: 9,287
  - Density: 51.33/km^{2} (132.9/sq mi)
- Website: http://www.bedzino.pl/

Gmina Będzino is a rural gmina (administrative district) in Koszalin County, West Pomeranian Voivodeship, in north-western Poland. Its seat is the village of Będzino, which lies approximately 13 kilometres (8 mi) west of Koszalin and 128 km (80 mi) north-east of the regional capital Szczecin.

The gmina covers an area of 180.92 square kilometres (69.9 sq mi), and as of 2006 its total population is 9,287.

== Villages ==
Gmina Będzino contains the villages and settlements of Barnin, Barninek, Będzinko, Będzino, Borkowice, Dobiesławiec, Dobre, Dobre Małe, Dobrzyca, Dworek, Kazimierz Pomorski, Kiszkowo, Kładno, Komory, Łasin Koszaliński, Łękno, Łopienica, Łubniki, Malinowo, Mączno, Miłogoszcz, Mścice, Pakosław, Pleśna, Podamirowo, Podbórz, Popowo, Przybyradz, Radomno (Dobiesławiec) Skrzeszewo, Słowienkowo, Śmiechów, Smolne, Stoisław, Strachomino, Strzepowo, Strzeżenice, Strzeżnice, Świercz, Tymień, Uliszki, Wiciąże Pierwsze, Wierzchominko, Wierzchomino, Zagaj and Ziębrze.

== Neighbouring gminas ==
Gmina Będzino is bordered by the city of Koszalin and by the gminas of Biesiekierz, Dygowo, Karlino, Mielno, Sianów and Ustronie Morskie.
