= Będzino =

- Village
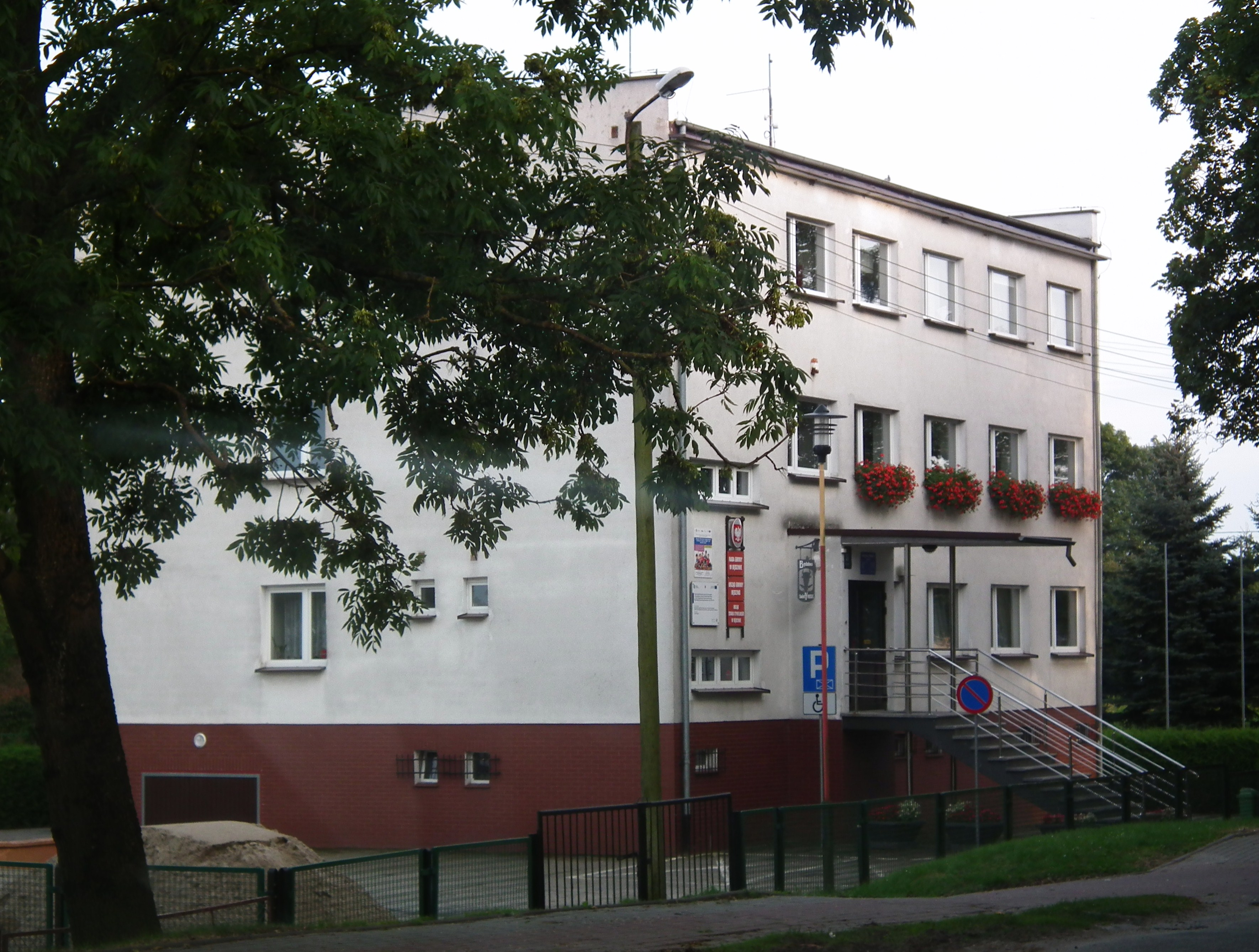
- Gmina office in Będzino

- Location within Poland
- Coordinates: 54°12′31″N 15°59′25″E
- Country: Poland
- Voivodeship: West Pomeranian
- County: Koszalin
- Gmina: Będzino

Population
  - Total: 580
- Website: http://www.bedzino.pl

Będzino [bɛnˈd͡ʑinɔ] is a village in Koszalin County, West Pomeranian Voivodeship, in north-western Poland. It is the seat of the gmina (administrative district) called Gmina Będzino. It lies approximately 13 km (8 mi) west of Koszalin and 128 km (80 mi) north-east of the regional capital Szczecin.

The area became part of the emerging Polish state under its first historic ruler Mieszko I around 967. Following the fragmentation of Poland, it formed part of the Duchy of Pomerania. From the 18th century, it formed part of Prussia. From 1871, it was part of Germany until the defeat of Nazi Germany in World War II. In 1945 the area was reintegrated back into Poland.
