= Measurement tower =

Meteorological structure

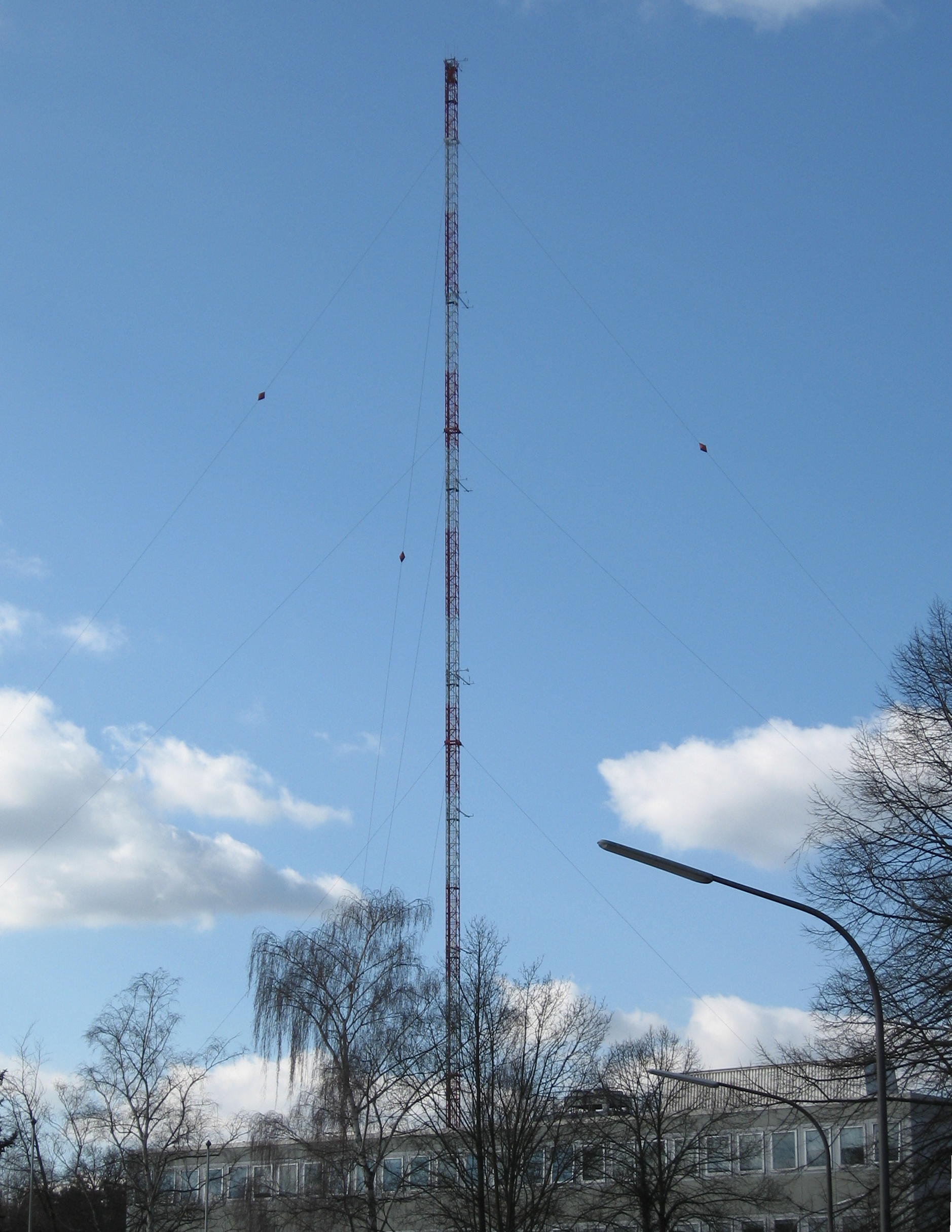
The measurement tower of Forschungszentrum Karlsruhe

A measurement tower or measurement mast, also known as meteorological tower or meteorological mast (met tower or met mast), is a free standing tower or a removed mast, which carries measuring instruments with meteorological instruments, such as thermometers and instruments to measure wind speed. Measurement towers are an essential component of rocket launching sites, since one must know exact wind conditions for an execution of a rocket launch. Met masts are crucial in the development of wind farms, as precise knowledge of the wind speed is necessary to know how much energy will be produced, and whether the turbines will survive on the site. Measurement towers are also used in other contexts, for instance near nuclear power stations, and by ASOS stations.

== Examples ==
=== Meteorology ===
Structure	City or region	Country	Height (metres)	Year built	Notes
Amazon Tall Tower Observatory	Vila de Balbina	Brazil	325	2015	
IAP Meteorological Tower	Beijing	China	325	1979	for meteorological measurements, studies of air pollution and studies of the atmospheric boundary layer
Obninsk Meteorological tower	Obninsk	Russia	310	1958	for meteorological and radioactivity measurements
Zotino Tall Tower Observation Facility	Zotino	Russia	302		for measurements of meteorological variables and of concentration of greenhouse gases and aerosols
KNMI-mast Cabauw	Cabauw	Netherlands	213	1972	for meteorological research
Jaslovské Bohunice Meteorological Tower	Jaslovské Bohunice	Slovakia	212	1986	
Meteorological tower of Forschungszentrum Karlsruhe	Karlsruhe	Germany	200	1972	
Rödeser Berg Meteorological Mast	Wolfshagen	Germany	200	2011	
KFU-Tower Gundremmingen	Gundremmingen	Germany	174	1978	
KFU-Mast Grafenrheinfeld	Grafenrheinfeld	Germany	164	1978	for the measurement of meteorological parameters and environmental radioactivity
Mast of Richard Assmann Observatory	Falkenberg	Germany	99	1998	
Mast of Asbach	Obrigheim	Germany			dismantled
Oskar-von-Miller-Tower	Garching	Germany	62	2010	
Mast of Dukovany Nuclear Power Station	Dukovany	Czech Republic			
Košetice Meteorological Tower	Košetice	Czech Republic	250	2012	
Hegyhátsál TV Tower	Hegyhátsál	Hungary	117		transmission tower equipped with instruments for the measurement of meteorological parameters and carbon dioxide concentration
Norunda tower	Uppsala County	Sweden	103		
Puijo tower	Kuopio	Finland	75	1963	
NAVO-Toren	Veurne	Belgium	243		

=== Other measurement towers ===
- Aerial test facility Brück, Brück, Germany
- BREN Tower, Nevada Test Site, USA

=== Wind farm development ===
Before developers construct a wind farm, they first measure the wind resource on a prospective site by erecting temporary measurement towers. Typically these mount anemometers at a range of heights up to the hub height of the proposed wind turbines, and log the wind speed data at frequent intervals (e.g. every ten minutes) for at least one year and preferably two or more. The data allow the developer to determine if the site is economically viable for a wind farm, and to choose wind turbines optimized for the local wind speed distribution.

== See also ==
- Automatic weather station#Mast
- Guyed mast
- Radio masts and towers
- Truss tower
