= List of tallest structures in the Netherlands =

A non-exhaustive list of the tallest completed structures in the Netherlands. The list contains all types of structures.

Name	Year	Structural type	Town	Pinnacle height	Coordinates	Remarks
Gerbrandytoren Lopik	1961	Partially guyed tower	IJsselstein	366.8 m (1,203 ft)	52°00′36.24″N 05°03′12.87″E	Original height: 382.5 metres. 1987: height reduction to 375 metres. Further height reduction to 366.8 metres on 2 August 2007
Zendstation Smilde	1959	Partially guyed tower	Smilde	303.5 m (996 ft)	52°54′9.8″N 6°24′12.23″E	Hit by aircraft in 1968, caught fire on 15 July 2011, upper 200 meters destroyed but rebuilt as a lattice mast
De Zalmhaven I	2022	Skyscraper	Rotterdam	215 m (705 ft)	51°54′37″N 4°28′50″E	Residential Tower. Tallest building in the Netherlands
KNMI-mast Cabauw	1972	Guyed mast	Cabauw	213 m (699 ft)	51°58′13.06″N 4°55′34.45″E	Meteorological research station
Shell Pernis	1968/1974	Chimney	Pernis	213 m (699 ft)	51°53′2.36″N 4°21′54.09″E ; 51°52′48.43″N 4°20′7.26″E	Two chimneys. Municipality part of Rotterdam.
Zendmast Radio Kootwijk	1925	Guyed mast	Radio Kootwijk	212 m (696 ft)	52°10′35″N 5°49′57″E	Demolished in 1945 by the Germans
Zendmast Radio Kootwijk	1947	Guyed mast	Radio Kootwijk	210 m (690 ft)	52°10′35″N 5°49′57″E	Demolished in 1980
Zendmast Lopik	1951	Guyed mast	IJsselstein	210 m (690 ft)		Demolished on 8 May 1962, replaced by Gerbrandytoren Lopik
Zendmast Wieringermeer	1967	Guyed mast	Wieringermeer	204.5 m (671 ft)	52°54′30.38″N 5°3′30.06″E	
KPN-Zendmast Waalhaven	1962	Tower	Rotterdam-Waalhaven	199 m (653 ft)	51°52′32.56″N 4°26′54.52″E	
KPN-Zendmast Hilversum	1973	Tower	Hilversum	196 m (643 ft)	52°14′33.6″N 5°9′52.34″E	
Mediumwave transmitter Flevoland	1980	Guyed mast	Flevoland	195 m (640 ft)	52°22′31.6″N 5°24′59.78″E ; 52°22′29.32″N 5°25′3.78″E	two masts, grounded, divided in 95 metres with an insulator, demolished 8 January 2019
Mediumwave transmitter Lopik	1938	Guyed mast	Lopik	196 m (643 ft)	52°0′1.74″N 5°2′42.55″E	insulated against ground, demolished on 4 September 2015
Euromast	1960	Tower	Rotterdam	186 m (610 ft)	51°54′19.79″N 4°27′59.7″E	Tallest tower open to the public with restaurant and observation area. Height extended in 1970
Maastoren	2009	Skyscraper	Rotterdam	182 m (597 ft)	51°54′28.86″N 4°29′34.48″E	Tallest office building in the country and Benelux
Hemweg Power Plant		Chimney	Amsterdam	178 m (584 ft)	52°24′22.28″N 4°50′40.26″E	
Amercentrale		Chimney	Geertruidenberg	176 m (577 ft)	51°42′31.32″N 4°50′40.18″E ; 51°42′28.17″N 4°50′37.78″E ; 51°42′40.13″N 4°50′35.68″E	
Borssele Coal-Fired Power Station		Chimney	Borsele	175 m (574 ft)	51°25′59.52″N 3°42′57.7″E	
Hemweg Power Plant		Chimney	Amsterdam	175 m (574 ft)	52°24′19″N 4°50′50″E	
Geleen		Chimney	Geleen	175 m (574 ft)	50°58′5.42″N 5°47′45.79″E	
Zendmast Lelystad	?	Tower	Lelystad	172 m (564 ft)	52°31′34.14″N 5°26′16.16″E	
Zendmast Markelo	?	Tower	Markelo	172 m (564 ft)	52°14′12.75″N 6°26′29.85″E	
Maasvlakte Power Plant		Chimney	Rotterdam	171 m (561 ft)	51°57′33.44″N 4°1′35.48″E; 51°57′31.28″N 4°1′36.78″E	
Radio- en televisietoren Roermond	?	Tower	Roermond	170 m (560 ft)	51°11′2.21″N 5°58′32.27″E	
Flarestick of Lyondell Maasvlakte PO-11	?	Guyed chimney	Rotterdam	165 m (541 ft)	51°58′14.31″N 4°1′8″E	
Delftse Poort	1991	Skyscraper	Rotterdam	164 m (538 ft)	51°55′27.51″N 4°28′20.11″E	
Lekkerkerk Powerline Crossing	1970	Lattice Tower	Lekkerkerk	163 m (535 ft)	51°53′14.03″N 4°40′39.39″E ; 51°53′33.48″N 4°40′20.53″E	
Nijmegen Power Plant		Chimney	Nijmegen	156 m (512 ft)	51°51′21.46″N 5°49′43.68″E	
Lange Lies	1953	Chimney	Heerlen	155 m (509 ft)		Demolished in 1976
Zendmast Zwolle		Lattice Tower	Zwolle	155 m (509 ft)	52°29′19.42″N 6°8′35.38″E	
Zendmast Digitenne		Lattice tower	The Hague	154 m (505 ft)	52°2′49.95″N 4°15′12.91″E	
Velson Power Station		Chimney	Velsen	154 m (505 ft)	52°28′22.02″N 4°37′55.83″E ; 52°28′18.01″N 4°38′7.24″E	
Kuwait Petroleum Refinery		Chimney	Europoort	154 m (505 ft)	51°56′2.15″N 4°10′16.12″E	
Lage Weide Plant		Chimney	Utrecht	152 m (499 ft)	52°6′10.87″N 5°4′20.42″E	
Montevideo	2005	Skyscraper	Rotterdam	152 m (499 ft)	51°54′14.63″N 4°29′7.43″E	Including "M" on the roof
NEREFCO-Chimney		Chimney	Europoort	151 m (495 ft)	51°56′41.81″N 4°6′27.89″E	
KEMA Toren	1969	Tower	Arnhem	150 m (490 ft)	51°59′10.83″N 5°52′33.47″E	
Maastricht ENCI-Cement Factory		Chimney	Maastricht	150 m (490 ft)	50°49′5.31″N 5°41′20.76″E	
Claus Centrale		Chimney	Maasbracht	150 m (490 ft)	51°9′16.01″N 5°24′23.99″E; 51°9′16.5″N 5°54′27.7″E	
Botlek		Chimney	Botlek	150 m (490 ft)	51°52′24.1″N 4°17′43.02″E	
Maasvlakte Wind Turbines		Wind turbine	Rotterdam	150 m (490 ft)	51°56′19″N 4°8′4″E	4 Units
Rembrandttower	1995	Skyscraper	Amsterdam	150 m (490 ft)	52°20′39.82″N 4°54′59.21″E	Including mast on the roof
Milleniumtower	2000	Skyscraper	Rotterdam	149 m (489 ft)	51°55′20.45″N 4°28′17.54″E	Including mast on the roof
KPN-toren Haarlem	1972	Tower	Haarlem	149 m (489 ft)	52°23′17.35″N 4°40′10.8″E	
Nozema tower Wormer	1968	Tower	Wormer	144 m (472 ft)	52°29′52.43″N 4°47′46.12″E	
Westpoint Tower	2004	Skyscraper	Tilburg	143 m (469 ft)	51°33′35.85″N 5°3′53.64″E	Tallest flat in the country
Hoftoren	2003	Skyscraper	The Hague	142 m (466 ft)	52°4′51.42″N 4°19′18.19″E	
Lange Jan	1937/38	Chimney	Heerlen	135 m (443 ft)		Demolished in 1976
KPN-toren Den Haag	1965	Tower	The Hague	133 m (436 ft)	52°4′50.54″N 4°20′9.24″E	
Het Strijkijzer	2007	Skyscraper	The Hague	132 m (433 ft)	52°4′17.75″N 4°19′27.6″E	
The Red Apple	2009	Skyscraper	Rotterdam	124 m (407 ft)	51°55′2″N 4°29′21″E	
World Port Center	2001	Skyscraper	Rotterdam	123 m (404 ft)	51°54′17.717″N 4°29′4.723″E	
De Rotterdam	2013	Skyscraper	Rotterdam	149 m (489 ft)	51°54′24″N 4°29′17″E	
Dom Tower	1382	Church tower	Utrecht	112 m (367 ft)	52°5′26.4″N 5°7′16.92″E	Nave destroyed by tornado in 1674, tower freestanding since
