= Susan Trumbore =

Atmospheric Carbon Cycle Scientist

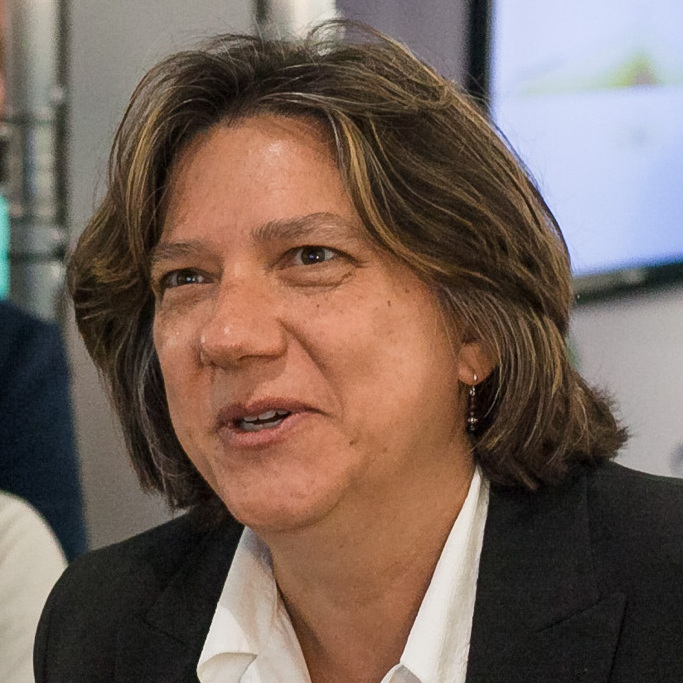
- Born: Susan E. Trumbore
- Education: University of Delaware (BS); Columbia University (PhD)
- Awards: Member of the National Academy of Sciences (2010); Benjamin Franklin Medal (2018); Balzan Prize (2020)
- Scientific career
- Fields: Carbon cycle Biogeochemistry
- Workplaces: Max Planck Institute for Biogeochemistry; University of California, Irvine
- Thesis: Carbon cycling and gas exchange in soils (1989)
- Doctoral students: Mariah Carbone
- Website: www.bgc-jena.mpg.de/bgp/index.php/SusanTrumbore/SusanTrumbore

Susan E. Trumbore is an earth systems scientist focusing on the carbon cycle and its effects on climate. She is a director at the Max Planck Institute for Biogeochemistry and a Professor of Earth System Science at University of California, Irvine. She is a fellow of the American Geophysical Union and the American Association for the Advancement of Science, a Member of the National Academy of Sciences and recipient of the Benjamin Franklin Medal.

== Education ==
Trumbore earned her bachelor of science in geology at the University of Delaware in 1981 and doctoral degree in geochemistry from Columbia University in 1989.

== Career and research ==
She held postdoctoral fellowships with the Swiss Federal Institute of Technology and Lawrence Livermore National Laboratory, and joined the faculty at the University of California, Irvine (UCI) in 1991. She is currently a Professor of Earth System Science at UCI, co-director the W.M. Keck Carbon Cycle Accelerator Mass Spectrometry Facility, and director of the UCI branch of the Institute for Geophysics and Planetary Physics. She has also been a director at the Max Planck Institute for Biogeochemistry since 2009. Trumbore is a member of the speaker team for the Collaborative Research Center 'AquaDiva' and a member of the German Center for Integrative Biodiversity Research 'iDiv' She is a co-coordinator of the joint Brazilian/German 'ATTO' project.

Other projects include 14Constraint, funded by an advanced grant from the European Research Council and the Tanguro Flux Project in collaboration with IPAM (Amazon Environmental Research Institute) and the Woods Hole Research Centre. Her former doctoral students include Mariah Carbone.

=== Recognition and awards ===
- 2024: Pour le Mérite for Sciences and Arts
- 2020: Awarded the Balzan Prize for Earth System Dynamics.
- 2018: Awarded Benjamin Franklin Medal in 2018 for "her pioneering use of radiocarbon measurements in forests and soils to assess the flow of carbon between the biosphere and atmosphere, with implications for the understanding of future climate change."
- 2015: Became a member of the German Academy of Sciences Leopoldina.
- 2010: Elected to the National Academy of Sciences
- 2005: Trumbore was elected as a fellow of the American Geophysical Union and the American Association for the Advancement of Science
