= 1962 in architecture =

The year 1962 in architecture involved some significant architectural events and new buildings.

== Events ==
- Construction of Dalgety Bay, a small New town in Fife, Scotland, begins.

== Buildings and structures ==
=== Buildings opened ===
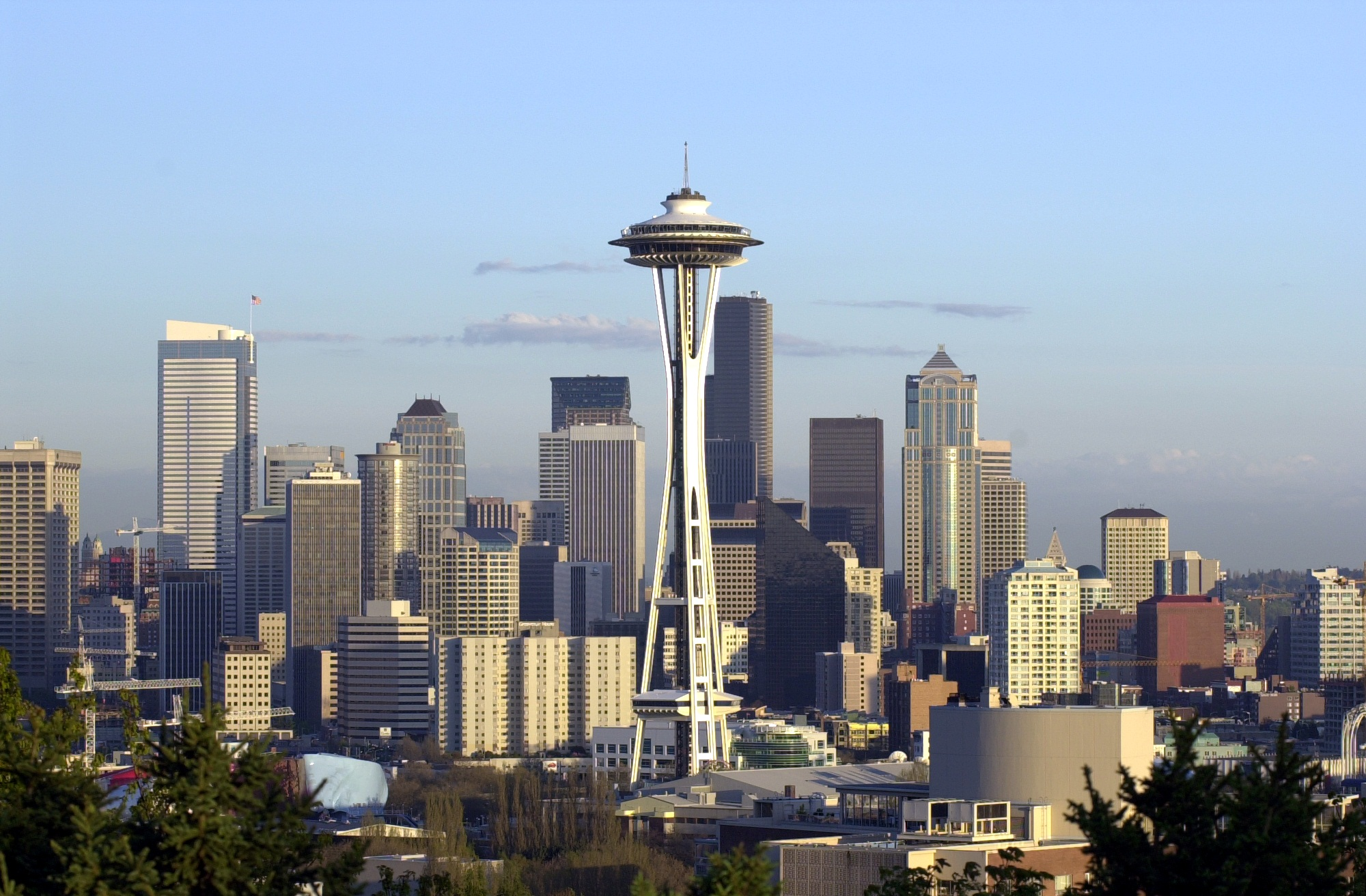
The Space Needle in Seattle, USA

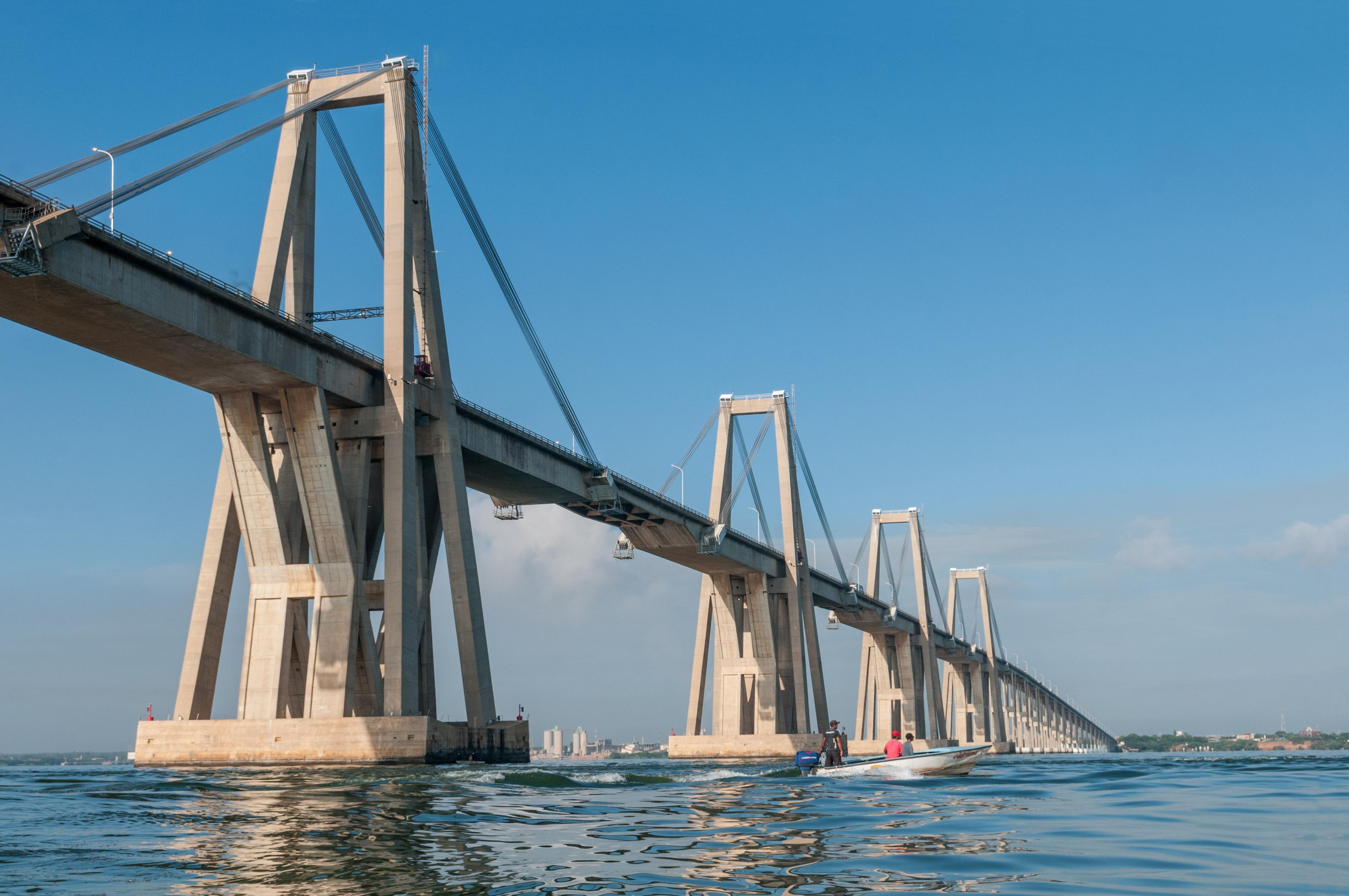
General Rafael Urdaneta Bridge over Lake Maracaibo, Venezuela

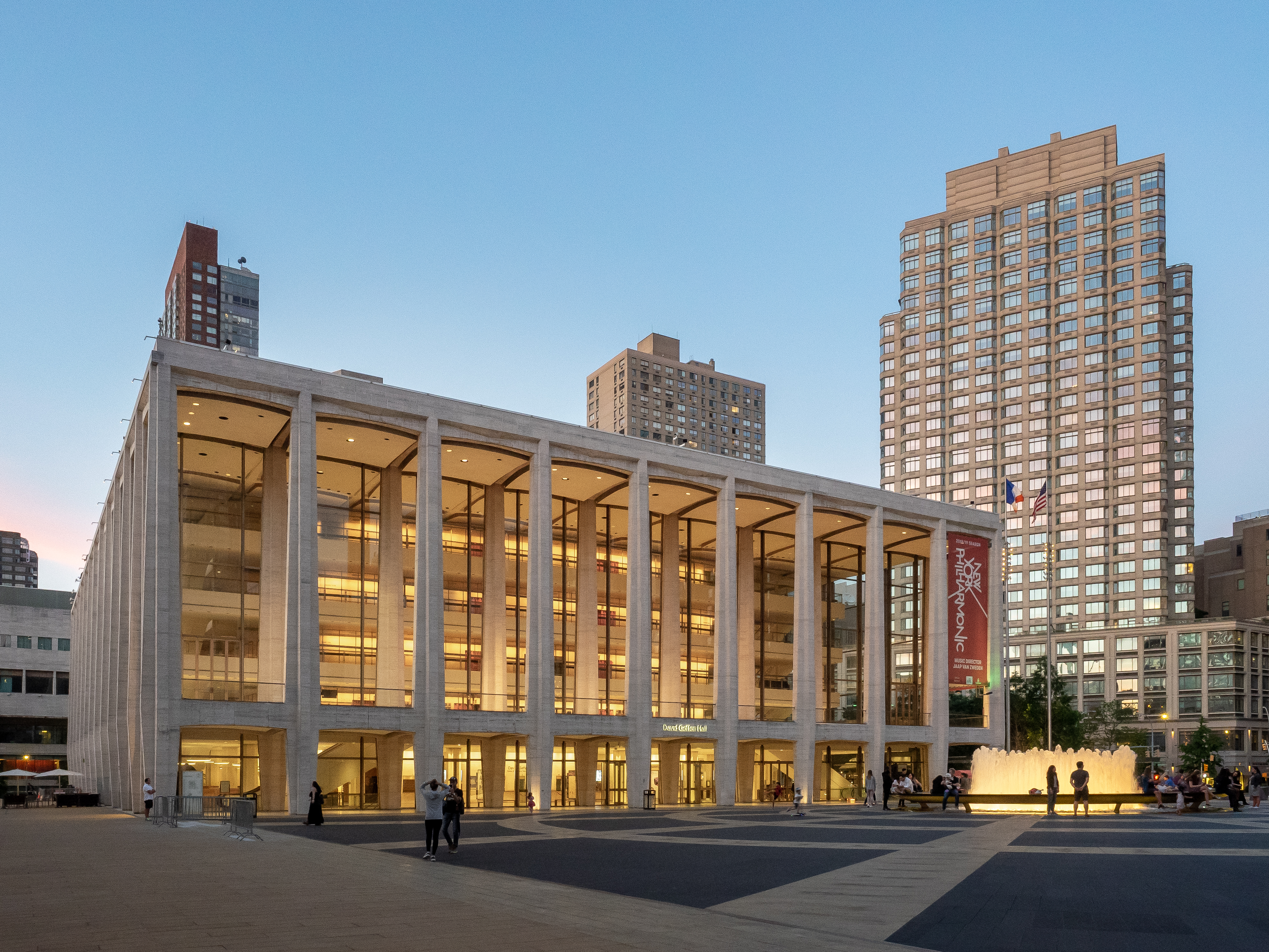
The Philharmonic Hall, Lincoln Center for the Performing Arts, New York City, USA

- April 21 – The Space Needle in Seattle, just in time for the Century 21 Exposition.
- May 25 – Coventry Cathedral in England, designed by Basil Spence, is consecrated.
- May 28 – TWA Flight Center at JFK Airport, New York, designed by Eero Saarinen.
- July 1 – The Minolta Tower in Niagara Falls.
- August 24 – General Rafael Urdaneta Bridge over Lake Maracaibo, Venezuela, designed by Riccardo Morandi; opened by President Romulo Betancourt.
- September 23 – Philharmonic Hall, Lincoln Center for the Performing Arts, New York City, designed by Max Abramovitz.
- November 6 – Commonwealth Institute in the London Borough of Kensington, designed by Sir Robert Matthew of RMJM; opened by Queen Elizabeth II (refurbished 2016 as the Design Museum).
- dates unknown
  - St George's Church, Rugby, Warwickshire, England, designed by Denys Hinton, is consecrated.
  - Saint Petersburg TV Tower in Saint Petersburg, Russia.
  - KPN-Zendmast Waalhaven in Rotterdam, Netherlands.

=== Buildings completed ===
- Both Marina City towers in Chicago, United States, are completed; however, they are not fully furnished until 1964.
- Tour CIBC in Montreal, Quebec, Canada.
- Place Ville Marie in Montreal, Quebec, Canada, becoming the tallest building in the British Commonwealth (1962–1964).
- CIS Tower in Manchester, England, designed by G. S. Hay and Gordon Tait, becoming the tallest building in the United Kingdom (1962–1963).
- Tryvannstårnet, broadcasting tower in Oslo, Norway.
- Sentech Tower, television transmitter in Johannesburg, South Africa (transmissions began in 1961).
- Policromatic condominium block in Zagreb by Ivo Vitic.
- United States Air Force Academy Cadet Chapel, Colorado Springs, designed by Walter Netsch.
- Tukal, on Beaulieu River in Hampshire, England, house designed for himself by Seymour Harris.

== Awards ==
- AIA Gold Medal – Eero Saarinen (posthumous).
- Architecture Firm Award – Skidmore, Owings & Merrill.
- Grand Prix de Rome, architecture – Piet Blom.
- RAIA Gold Medal – Joseph Fowell.
- RIBA Royal Gold Medal – Sven Gottfried Markelius.

== Births ==
- February 25 – Andres Siim, Estonian architect
- November 30 – Senan Abdelqader, Palestinian architect

== Deaths ==
- January 16 – Ivan Meštrović, Croatian sculptor and architect (born 1883)
- April 21 – W. Gray Young, New Zealand architect (born 1885)
- May 14 – Dov Karmi, Israeli architect (born 1905)
- August 18 – Max Fabiani, Slovene-Italian architect (born 1865)
- September 23 – Louis de Soissons, Canadian-born English architect (born 1890)
- December 28 – Karl Völker, German architect and painter (born 1889)
