= Kees Christiaanse =

Dutch architect and urban planner

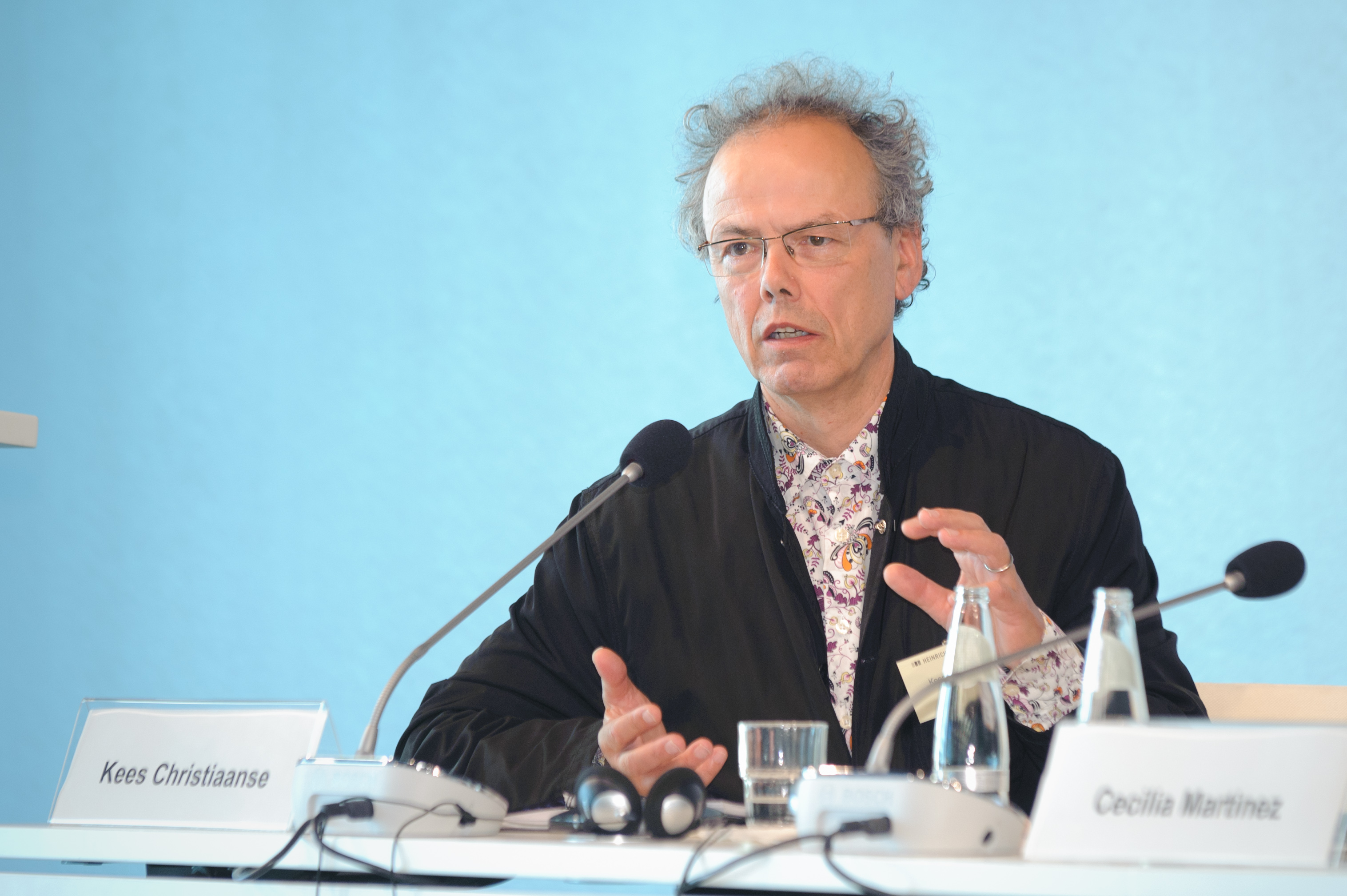
Kees Christiaanse (2011)

Kees Christiaanse (born 1953, Amsterdam) is an architect and urban planner from the Netherlands. After working with Rem Koolhaas, he started two firms, KCAP (Kees Christiaanse Architects & Planners, in Rotterdam) in 1989 and Architects and Planners (ASTOC, in Cologne) in 1990, where he was a partner till 2002. Christiaanse has "tackled some of the highest profile urban design schemes in the Netherlands, hosting buildings by" the finest Dutch and several international architects.

== Life and work ==
Christiaanse worked with Rem Koolhaas' architecture firm, OMA, where he was made a partner in 1983 at the age of 30, and worked for the firm until 1989. After OMA, he founded Kees Christiaanse Architects and Planners (KCAP, in Rotterdam, 1989) and ASTOC Architects and Planners (in Cologne, 1990); he worked with ASTOC until 2002. He was also artistic director of the Dutch Building Department from 1993 to 1996. From 1996 to 2003 he was a professor of architecture and urban planning at Technische Universität Berlin, and was Professor of Architecture and Urban Design at the Institute for Urban Design at ETH in Zürich from 2003 to 2018.

Two monographs on Christiaanse's work have been published, and an exhibition of the work done by his firms, "The City as Loft," was held at DeSingel in Antwerp in 2003. He is known for his urban planning work and "has quietly become the power behind the throne of Dutch architecture." He now lives and works in Zurich.

Christiaanse was the curator of the 4th International Architecture Biennale Rotterdam, and takes on large-scale projects such as the development of neglected areas for the 2012 Summer Olympics. His latest project is the design of a masterplan for an "engineering campus" (or "science park") in the Bavarian city of Augsburg, a 70-acre (280,000 m^{2}) project for which the state government (Freistaat Bayern) and the city are contributing 60 million Euros.

== Urban planning philosophy ==
Of particular interest to Christiaanse is the modern city, especially its openness or lack thereof. His designs as well as his public statements propagate the idea of "mixed communities," as he explained in an interview, to counteract the modern move toward gated communities and to increase different kinds of interactions among citizens. Such interactions, and the social control that comes along with it, also increase security, a concern in many European lower-income neighborhoods. The buildings to be built in such new neighborhoods Christiaanse calls "socializing machines." The metaphor Christiaanse often uses, of the city as a tree, is borrowed from architect and urban theorist Christopher Alexander, whose 1965 essay "A City Is Not A Tree" had suggested that cities grow like trees at their peril, with branches only connected to each other via the trunk. Alexander's fear, Christiaanse suggests, has become real, according to a keynote speech he delivered at the Holcim Forum 2007 for the Holcim Foundation, which is the key to his lament that "The city becomes a tree [the urban landscape becomes a forest of trees]." In a presentation given to the Urban Age South America Conference, December 2008, he gave some characteristics of the openness he wants cities to encourage in order to prevent this segmentation. Cities should be (or have):

- Walkable
- Fine maze public space grid
- Active street front typologies
- Mix use mix size mi[x] social mix age
- No style.

== Buildings ==
- Poseidon, office building, The Hague (1996)
- Kavel 25, housing project, The Hague (1992)
- Snackbar Bram Ladage, snackbar with 18 ft (5.5 m) Pepsi can (1992)
- Housing blocks on Java Island, Amsterdam (1998)
- Hogeschool Rotterdam, building for Arts, Architecture, Education departments (1998)
- Kenniscentrum NISA, building for the Netherlands Institute of Ship and Underwater Archeology (1999)
- Het Baken, residential tower, Deventer (2002)
- De Witte Keizer, residential high-rise, Rotterdam (2005)
- The Red Apple, residential high-rise with office buildings, Rotterdam (2009)
- Park and ride facilities for Uithof, Utrecht (2011)

== Urban planning ==
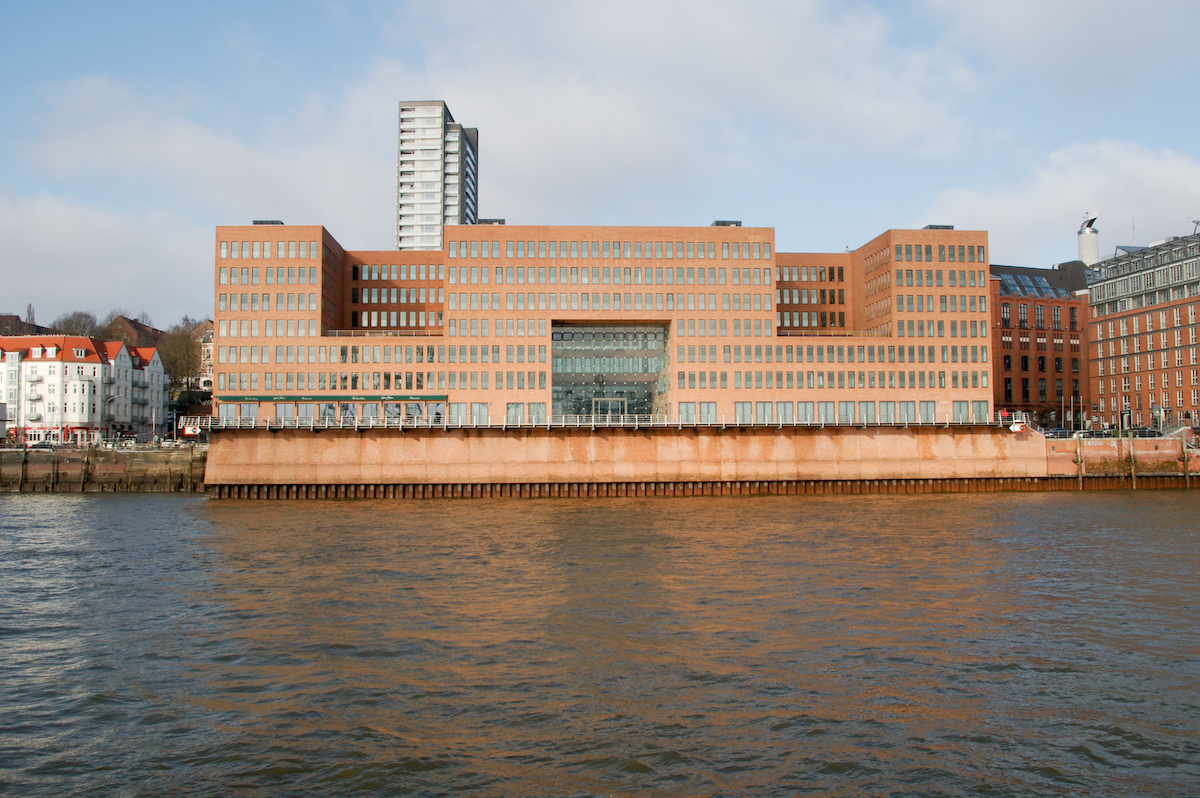
"Vexierbild" (picture puzzle), a Holzhafen building in Hamburg, Germany, designed by Christiaanse's ASTOC firm

- Masterplan for housing festival, Hague (1987)
- Urban plan for Leidsche Rijn Vinex near Utrecht (1995)
- City plan Zuidhavenkwartier, Rotterdam
- Master plan for Eastern Docklands, Amsterdam (1998)
- Urban plan for Vinex location Schuytgraaf, Arnhem (1998)
- Urban plan for Lelystad South area of the Flevoland Vinex (1999)
- Winning proposal in 1999 for HafenCity in Hamburg, one of the largest European rebuilding projects of the 21st century
- "Vexierbild," three buildings in Hamburg Holzhafen, first building finished 2003 ("Vexierbild" translates as "impossible object"—the buildings suggest the earlier warehouses and by virtue of their open architecture allow an observer to see through to them to the city)
- Olympic Legacy Masterplan for the 2012 Summer Olympics
- Stadionpark Rotterdam
- Europaallee
- Jurong Lake District

== See also ==
- Dutch architects

== Bibliography ==
- Kees Christiaanse. Rotterdam: Uitgeverij 010, 1999. ISBN 90-6450-324-9.
- Situation KCAP: Architects and Planners. Basel, Boston: Birkhäuser; Rotterdam: NAi, 2005. ISBN 978-3-7643-7492-1.
- Campus and the City. Urban Design for the Knowledge Society. Kerstin Hoeger, Kees Christiaanse (eds.) Zuerich: gta publishers; 2007. ISBN 978-3-85676-218-6.
- Urban Reports. Urban strategies and visions in mid-sized cities in a local and global context. Nicola Schüller, Petra Wollenberg and Kees Christiaanse (eds.) Zuerich: gta publishers; 2009. ISBN 978-3-85676-228-5.
- Open City. Designing Coexistence. Tim Rieniets, Jennifer Sigler, Kees Christiaanse (eds.) Amsterdam: SUN architecture; 2009. ISBN 978-90-8506-783-2.
- Textbook. Kees Christiaanse, Jessica Bridger (eds.) Rotterdam: NAi010; 2018. ISBN 978-94-6208-442-1.
