= Mariah Carbone =

American geophysicist and academic

Mariah Suzanne Carbone
- Education: Wesleyan University; University of California, Irvine
- Scientific career
- Fields: Climate change Earth system science Ecology; Isotopes; Radiocarbon
- Workplaces: Northern Arizona University
- Thesis: Partitioning sources of ecosystem respiration : tracking the allocation and residence time of the products of photosynthesis (2007)
- Doctoral advisor: Susan Trumbore
- Website: carbone-lab.nau.edu

Mariah Suzanne Carbone is an American geophysicist who is a professor of Geosciences at the center for ecosystem science and society, Northern Arizona University. She studies terrestrial ecosystems and how they respond to environmental change.

== Early life and education ==
Carbone was an undergraduate student at Wesleyan University where she played women's soccer for the Wesleyan Cardinals. She moved to the University of California, Irvine for doctoral research, supervised by Susan Trumbore. Her thesis investigated ecosystem respiration and the residence time of the products of photosynthesis.

== Research and career ==
Carbone studies how terrestrial ecosystems respond to environmental change, and how these ecosystems impact the Earth's climate. She makes use of isotope tracers to understand carbon cycling through plants and soils. This allows Carbone to understand how increasing levels of carbon dioxide will influence terrestrial ecosystems. Investigating the fate of carbon in terrestrial ecosystems with temporal and spatial resolution allows Carbone to unravel the molecular mechanisms of different geological processes at local and global scales. She combines field research with computational analysis to understand carbon distribution amongst plants, subterranean carbon dioxide fluxes and the relationships between carbon and water. To investigate these phenomena, Carbone primarily uses radioactive isotopic tracers (e.g. measurements of carbon-14, which can be used to characterize the age of carbon) and accelerator mass spectrometry.

=== Carbon in plants ===
Carbon is formed during photosynthesis and contributes to growth, metabolism, and above- and below-ground structures. Before the work of Carbone, it was unclear about how plants allocate this carbon. She is also interested in the role of non-structural carbon (i.e. carbon in sugars and lipids). She measures the concentrations of non-structural carbon and uses bomb pulse approaches to understand the age of this carbon. Bomb pulse refers to the rapid rise, sharp peak and exponential decline of Carbon-14 that occurred during the 1950s/1960s due to above ground nuclear weapons testing. Variations in Carbon-14 can provide information on molecular biosynthesis since 1955. Using this approach, Carbone has studied ancient redwood trees in California. Through this work she looks to understand the amount of non-structural carbon in resilience to wild fires.

=== Subterranean carbon dioxide fluxes ===
To better understand the contributions of above- and below-ground sources to carbon dioxide flux, Carbone develops process-based models. Below-ground, these sources include soil respiration. Until Carbone's work, it was difficult to measure this respiration at high frequencies, or to understand how flux impacts biotic and abiotic processes.

=== Carbon – water relationships ===
Carbone's research investigates the relationships between water cycle and carbon cycle.

== Selected publications ==
- Michael C. Dietze; Anna Sala; Mariah S. Carbone; Claudia I Czimczik; Joshua A Mantooth; Andrew D Richardson; Rodrigo Vargas (20 November 2013). "Nonstructural carbon in woody plants". Annual Review of Plant Biology. 65: 667–687. doi:10.1146/annurev-arplant-050213-040054. ISSN 1543-5008. PMID 24274032. Wikidata Q38165964.
- Andrew D Richardson; Mariah S Carbone; Trevor F Keenan; Claudia I Czimczik; David Y Hollinger; Paula Murakami; Paul G Schaberg; Xiaomei Xu (29 November 2012). "Seasonal dynamics and age of stemwood nonstructural carbohydrates in temperate forest trees". New Phytologist. 197 (3): 850–861. doi:10.1111/nph.12042. ISSN 0028-646X. PMID 23190200. Wikidata Q39297896.
- Mariah S Carbone; Christopher J Still; Anthony R Ambrose; Todd E Dawson; A. Park Williams; Claudia M Boot; Sean Schaeffer; Joshua P Schimel (13 April 2011). "Seasonal and episodic moisture controls on plant and microbial contributions to soil respiration". Oecologia. 167 (1): 265–278. Bibcode:2011Oecol.167..265C. doi:10.1007/s00442-011-1975-3. ISSN 0029-8549. PMID 21487825. Wikidata Q38931780.
- Mariah S Carbone; Susan E Trumbore (1 January 2007). "Contribution of new photosynthetic assimilates to respiration by perennial grasses and shrubs: residence times and allocation patterns". New Phytologist. 176 (1): 124–135. doi:10.1111/j.1469-8137.2007.02153.x. ISSN 0028-646X. PMID 17803644. Wikidata Q46422170.
