= Zotino Tall Tower Observation Facility =

Climate research station in Siberia

Coordinates: 60°47′54″N 89°21′13″E

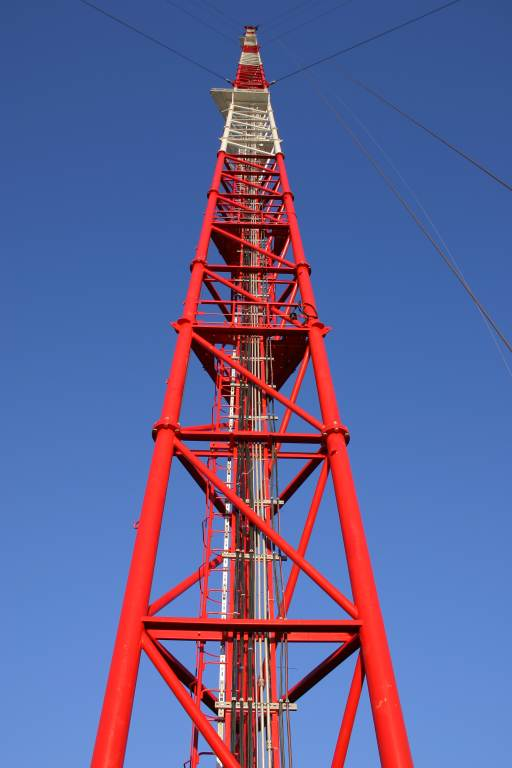
Zotino Tall Tower Observation Facility

The Zotino Tall Tower Observation Facility (ZOTTO) is a climatic research station in the Siberian taiga in the proximity of Zotino, Russia, established and operated by the Max Planck Society and the Sukachev Institute of Forest. It serves as a long-term observing platform to be operated for at least 30 years.

Far from human influences, researchers aim to determine how the concentration of greenhouse gases, aerosols, and the rising temperatures of the terrestrial atmosphere affect each other mutually.

The heart of the station is a 304-metre-high (997 ft) tower on which precision instruments measure the concentration of carbon dioxide, methane, and other greenhouse gases. The measurement data are processed directly in the station at the foot of the tower and then transferred to the Institute of Forest, in Krasnoyarsk, Russia, as well as to the Max Planck Institute for Biogeochemistry in Jena, Germany.

The station has been operational since September 2006. It extended the project Terrestrial Carbon Observing System and was funded by the 5th framework programme of the European Union, uniting 8 European and 4 Russian partners. A main conclusion of the project is that Siberian forests constitute a substantially smaller carbon sink than so far assumed.

== See also ==
- Amazon Tall Tower Observatory (ATTO), a similar tower in the Brazilian Amazon rainforest
