= The Red Apple =

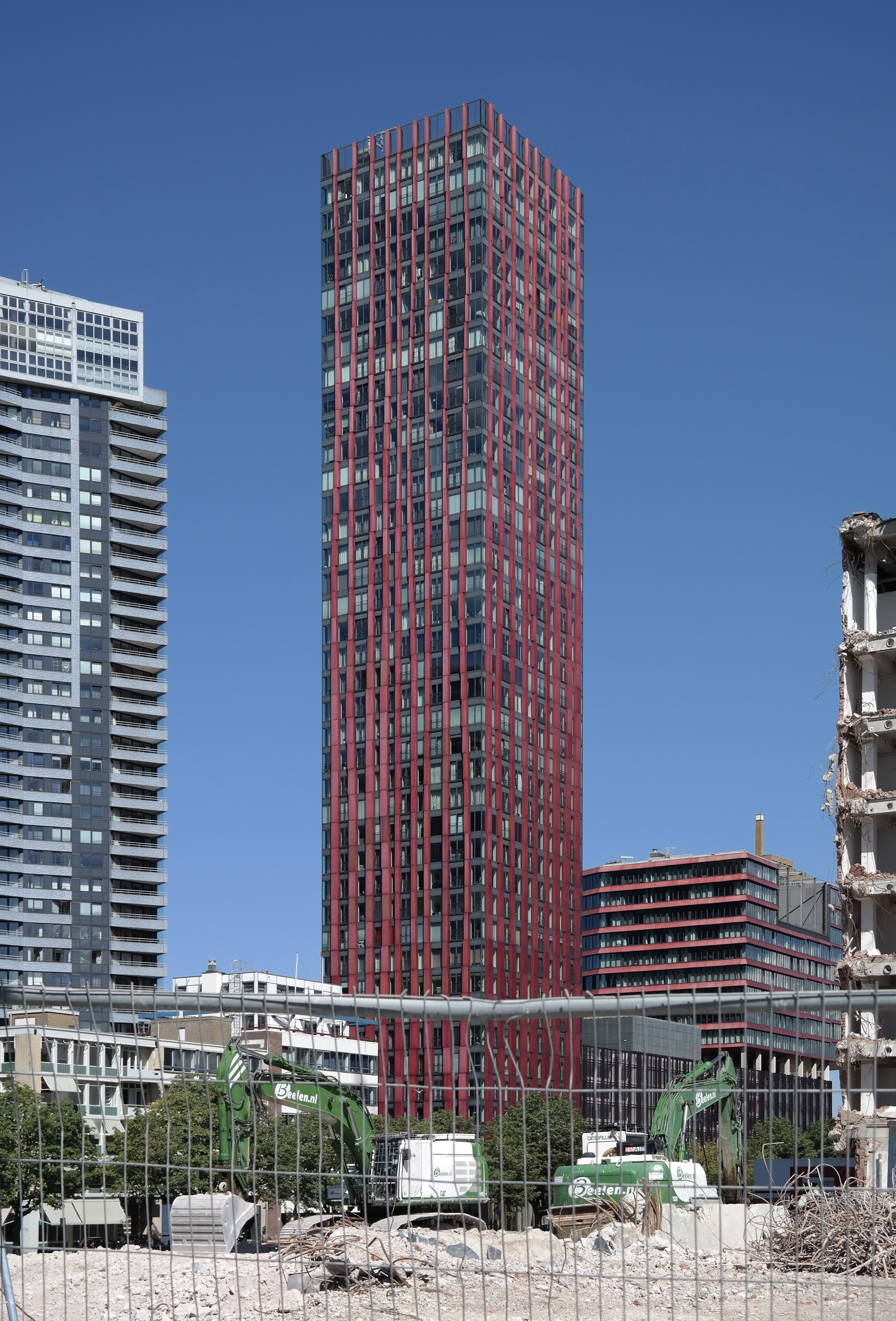
- The tower in 2020
- Interactive map of the The Red Apple area

General information
- Status: Completed
- Type: Residential; Commercial offices
- Architectural style: Modernism
- Location: Wijnbrugstraat 50-352; Rotterdam, Netherlands
- Coordinates: 51.917222°N 4.489167°E
- Completed: 2005–2009

Height
- Roof: 124 m (407 ft)

Technical details
- Floor count: 40
- Lifts/elevators: 6

Design and construction
- Architects: KCAP Architects & Planners; Jan des Bouvrie
- Engineer: TBI groep
- Main contractor: Aannemersbedrijf v/h Boele & Van Eesteren

Other information
- Number of units: 200

The Red Apple is a 40-storey, 124-metre (407 ft) residential skyscraper on Wijnhaven Island in Rotterdam, Netherlands, designed by KCAP Architects & Planners and Jan des Bouvrie. The building was topped out in 2008, completed in 2009, and features 121 units, and a 338-space multi-storey car park. It is the tenth-tallest building in Rotterdam. The Kopblok is a 53-metre-tall (174 ft) building that has an additional 79 apartment units and offices. The ground floor is designed for shops and restaurants. The entire complex has an open fiber network.

== Gallery ==
The Red Apple Construction Progress
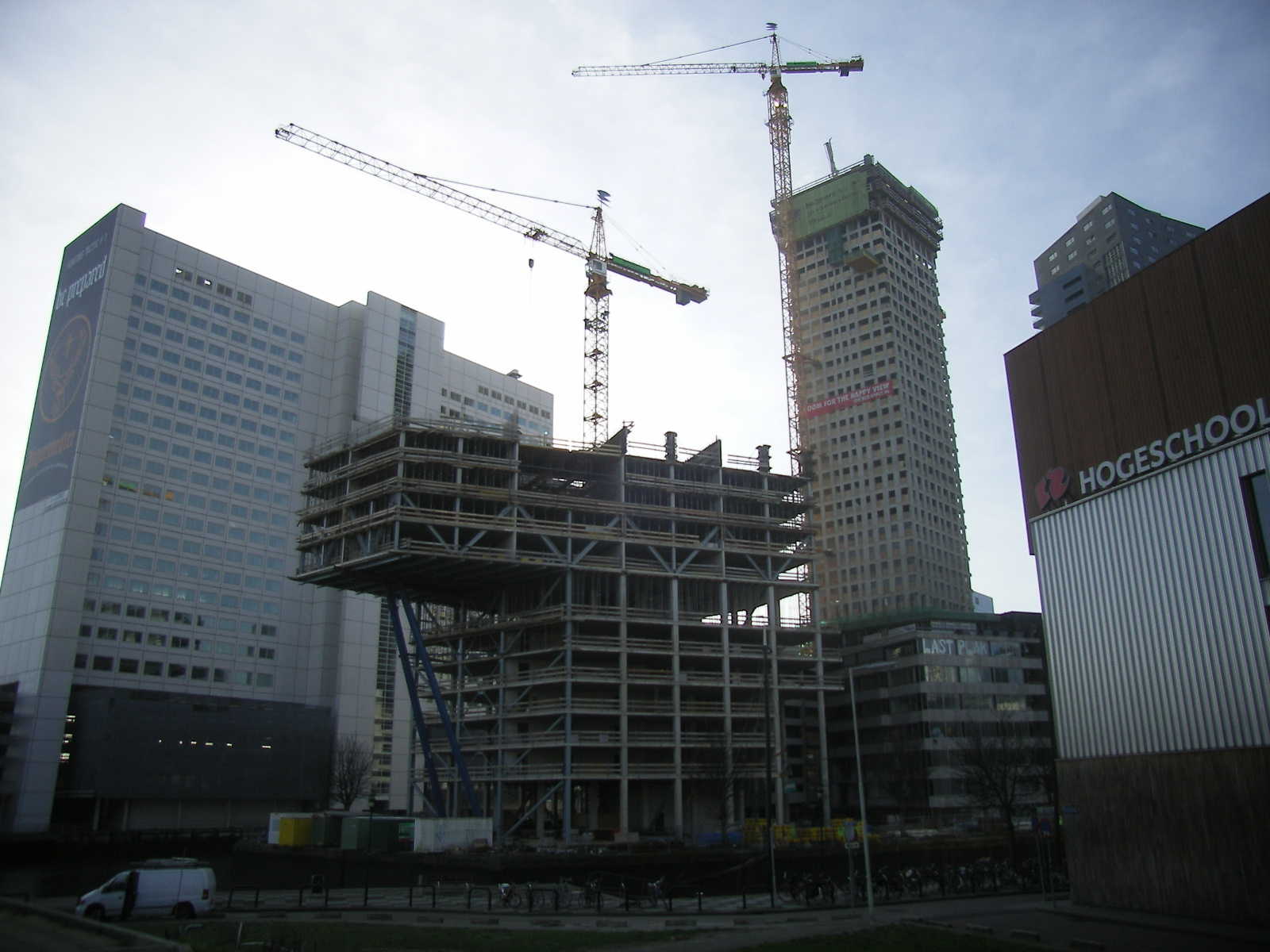
January 2008

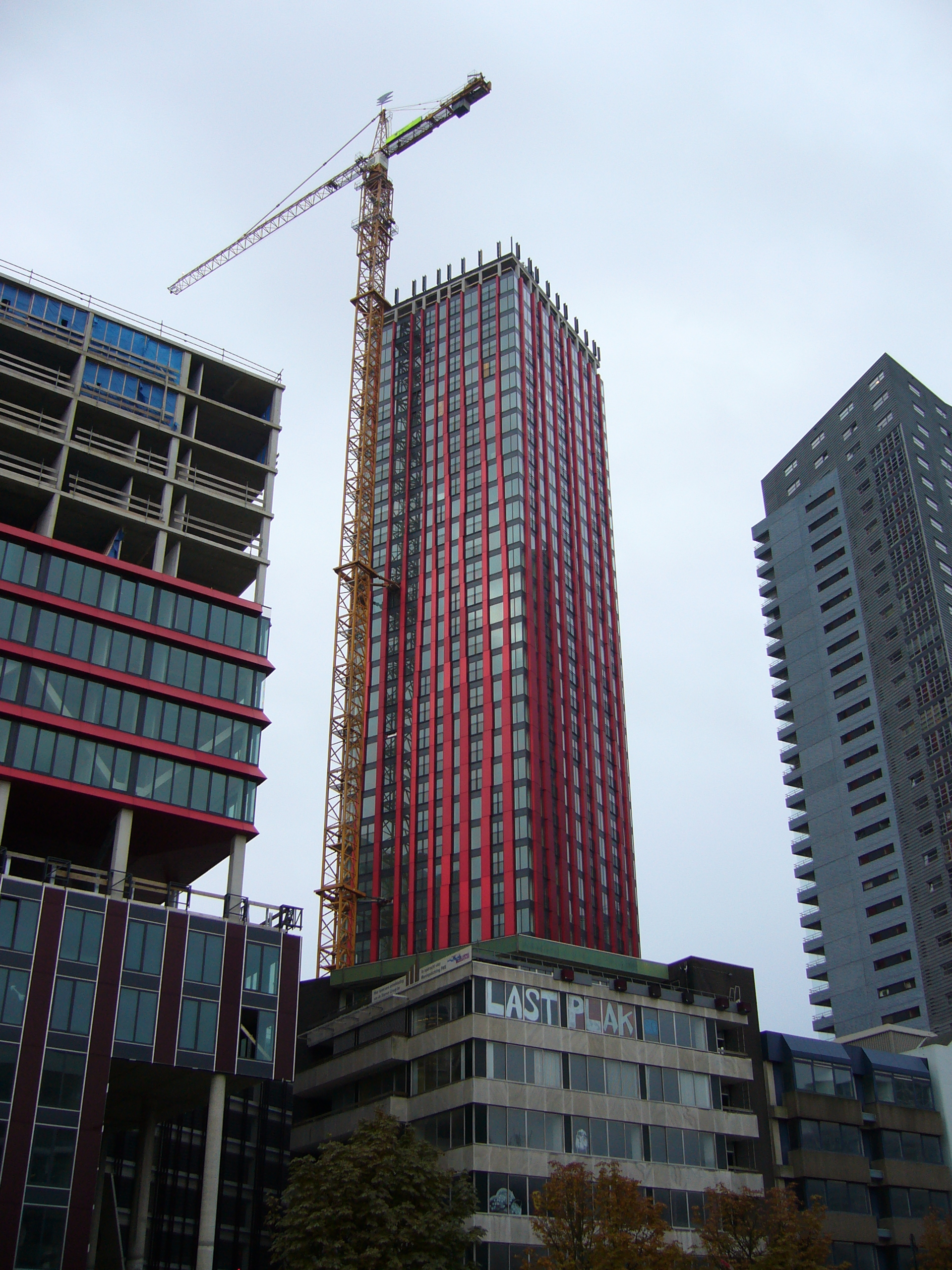
October 2008, the tower

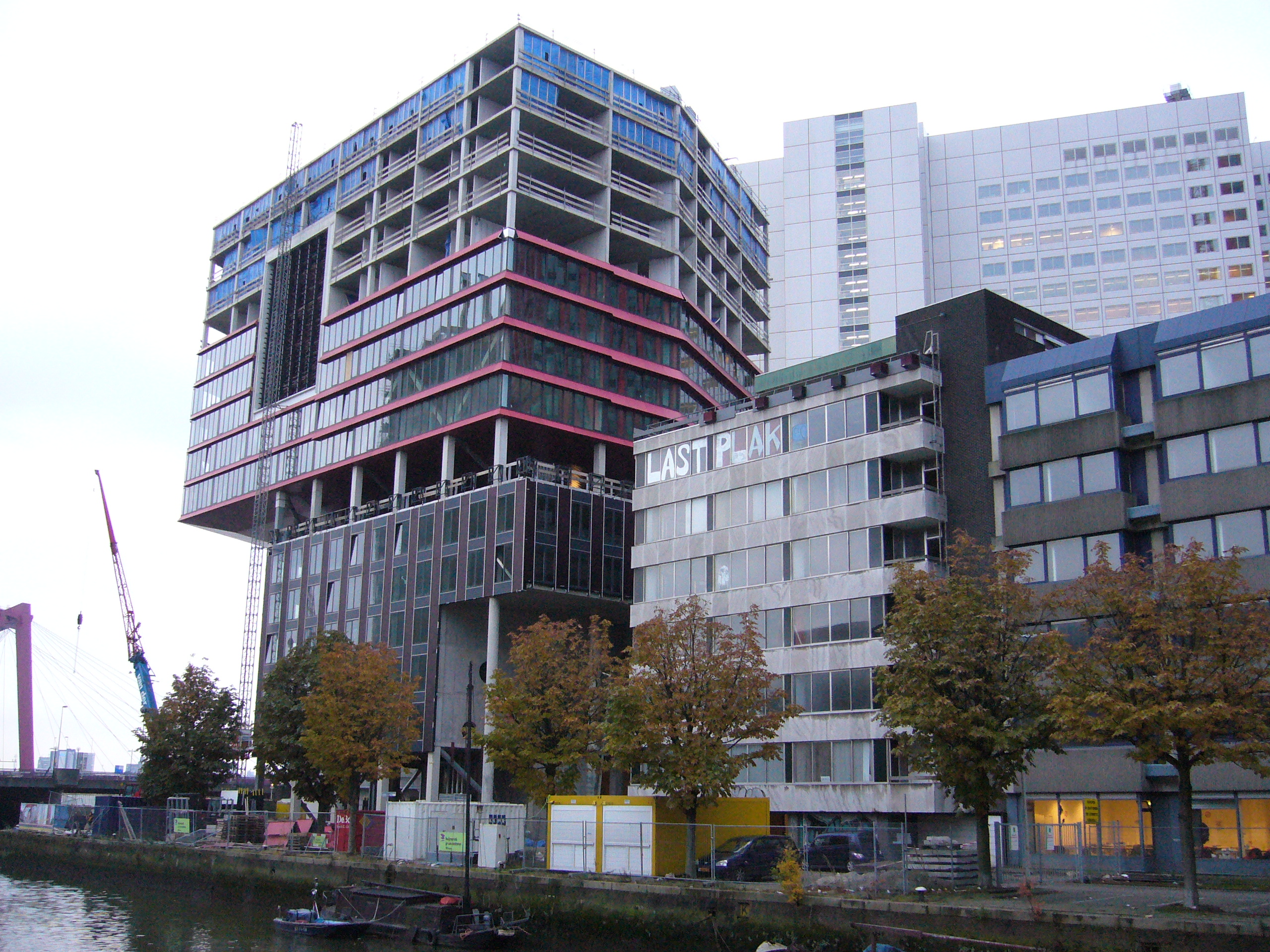
October 2008, low-rise

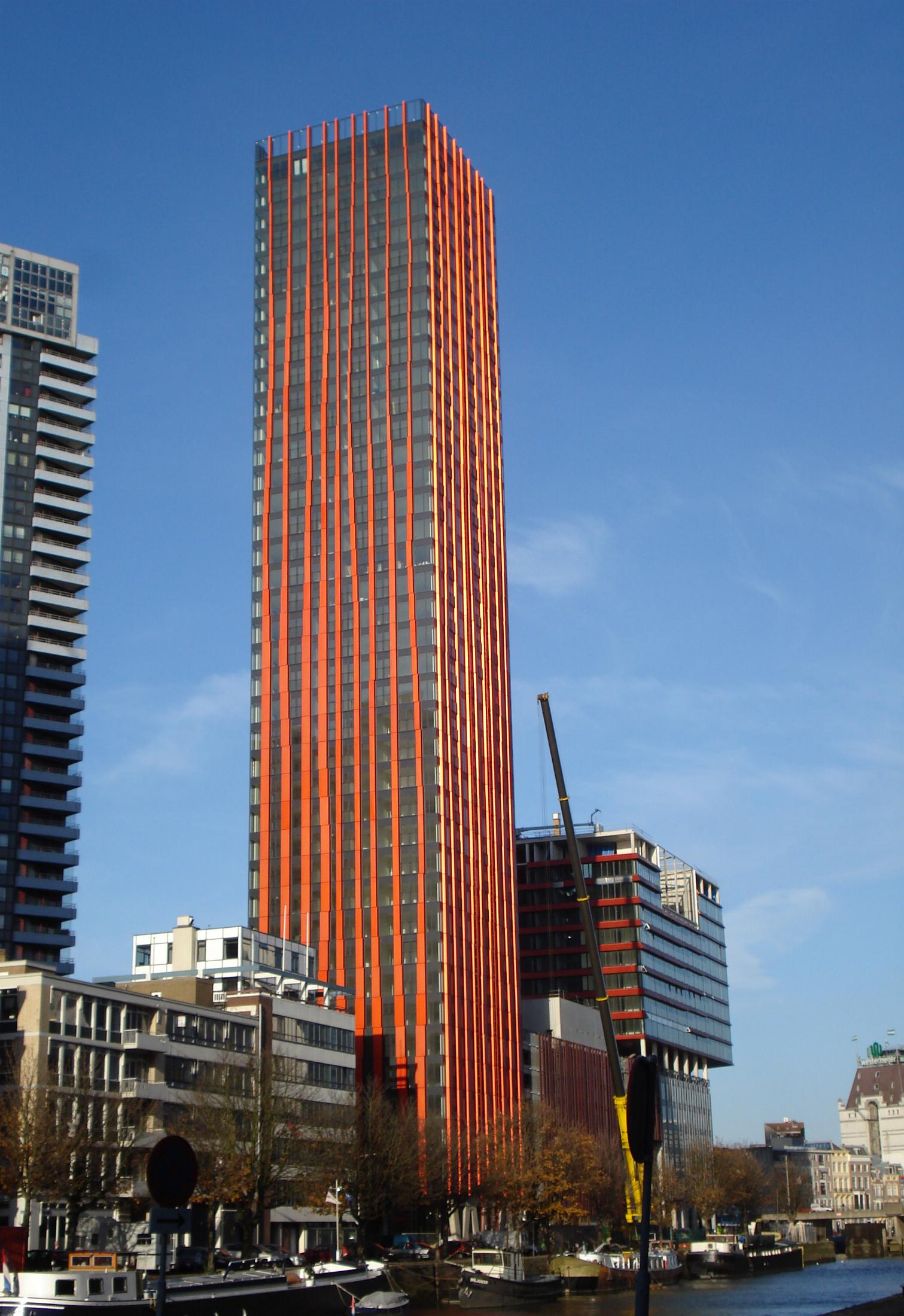
November 2008, Final construction stage

== See also ==
- List of tallest buildings in Rotterdam
- List of tallest buildings in the Netherlands
- List of tallest structures in the Netherlands
