= Amazon Tall Tower Observatory =

Scientific research facility

Coordinates: 2.1430°S 59.0010°W

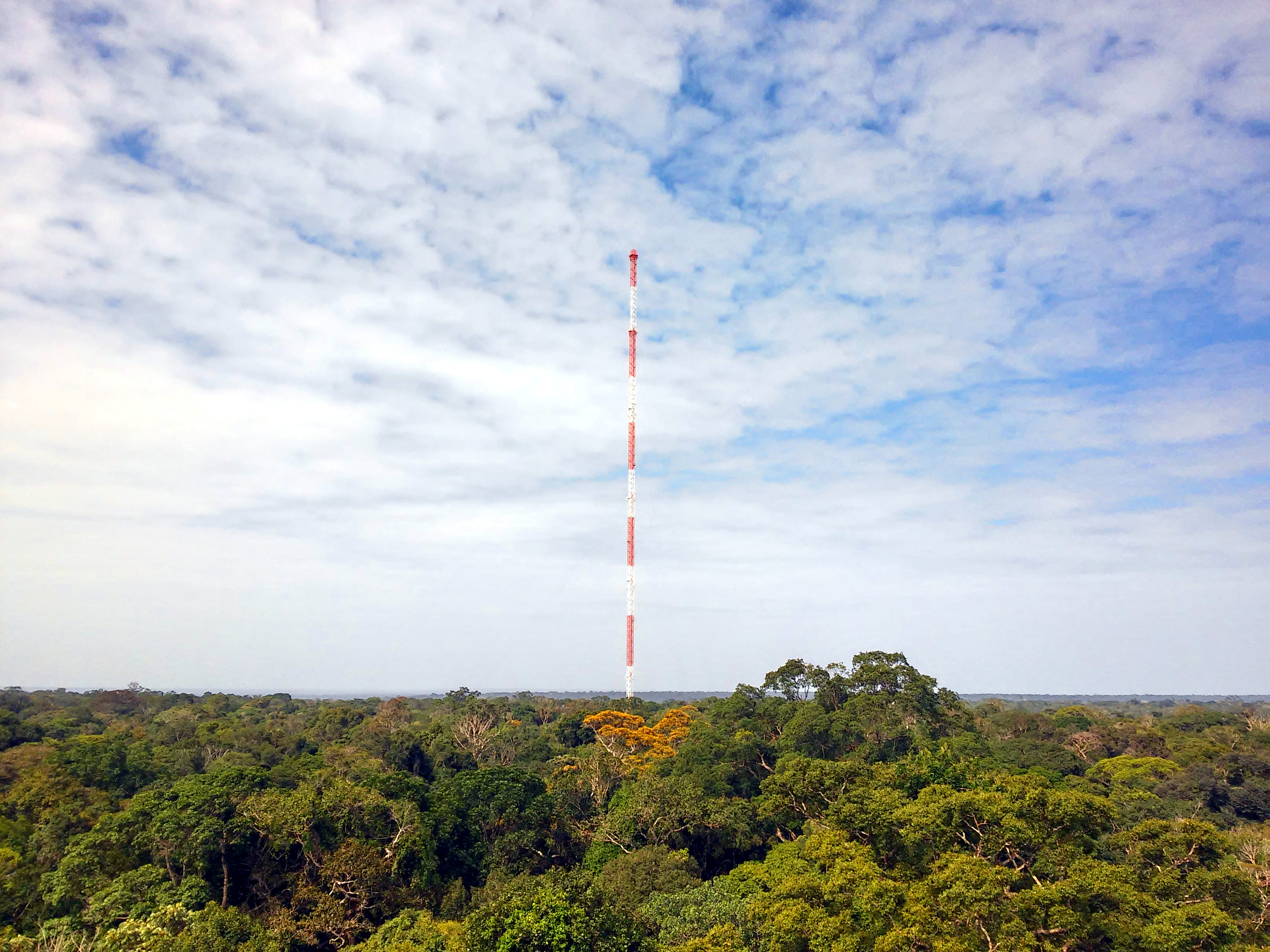
ATTO's tall tower observed from one of the 80-m towers

The Amazon Tall Tower Observatory or ATTO is a scientific research facility in the Amazon rainforest of Brazil. This includes a 325-metre-tall (1,066 ft) tower that extends far above the forest canopy and two 80-metre (260 ft) towers that allow researchers to collect samples from the soil surface to above the forest canopy. Additionally, there are climate-controlled containers for laboratory equipment and an office, a base camp and nearby sites for studying vegetation and soil processes. The tall research tower is one metre taller than the Eiffel Tower and is currently the tallest structure in South America. All towers are equipped with a broad range of instruments to measure chemical and physical properties of the atmosphere, such as greenhouse gas concentrations, aerosols and meteorological data.

== Description ==
The observatory is a joint project between Germany and Brazil coordinated by the Max Planck Institute for Biogeochemistry on the German side and the Brazilian National Institute of Amazonian Research, INPA (Instituto Nacional de Pesquisas da Amazônia) on the Brazilian side. Other major research partners include the Max Planck Institute for Chemistry and the University of the State of Amazonas, with over 20 research institutes and universities in Brazil, Germany and other countries participating. The initial building cost of 8.4 million euros was shared about equally by the German and Brazil partners.

The site is located deep within the Amazon rainforest. The nearest large urban area is the city of Manaus in the state Amazonas, about 150 kilometres (93 mi) southwest of the ATTO site. The towers are used to study the interactions between the forest and the atmosphere. Greenhouse gases, aerosols and weather, among other data, are measured continuously as well as during field campaigns. They provide information about a roughly 100 km^{2} (39 sq mi) area of largely pristine rainforest. This is especially true during the wet season when the direction brings mostly "clean" air to the site that resembles the pre-industrial atmosphere. During the dry season, the wind direction shifts and puts the ATTO site within the influence of Manaus and the "arc of deforestation" and air pollution is noticeable even here.

ATTO's counterpart "ZOTTO" (Zotino Tall Tower Observation Facility) is located in the Siberian Taiga of Russia.

== Research objectives ==
The project aims to study large- and smaller scale processes, from how the forest and soil influence greenhouse gases, aerosols, air mixing and clouds, to soil chemistry, microbiology and biodiversity. The main research questions are:

- How does the Amazon forest interact with climate and the water cycle?
- What is the role of the Amazon forest in the global cycles of greenhouse gases such as carbon dioxide, methane, and nitrous oxide?
- How do volatile organic compounds emitted from vegetation and soils affect atmospheric chemistry and the formation of aerosols and clouds?

The project is also dedicated to the exploration of how the rainforest biosphere responds to global warming.

According to the German Federal Ministry of Education and Research (BMBF), ATTO enables new levels of measurements of the complex interactions between the land surface and the atmosphere. Furthermore, the research project studies chemical and physical processes over the Amazon which affect the climate.

== History ==
The project was launched in 2009. The two 80 m towers were operational by 2012. Building of the tall tower began in 2014 and was completed in 2015.

== See also ==
- Zotino Tall Tower Observation Facility, a similar tower in Siberia
