= Communication Tower =

Coordinates: 51.8757°N 4.4485°E

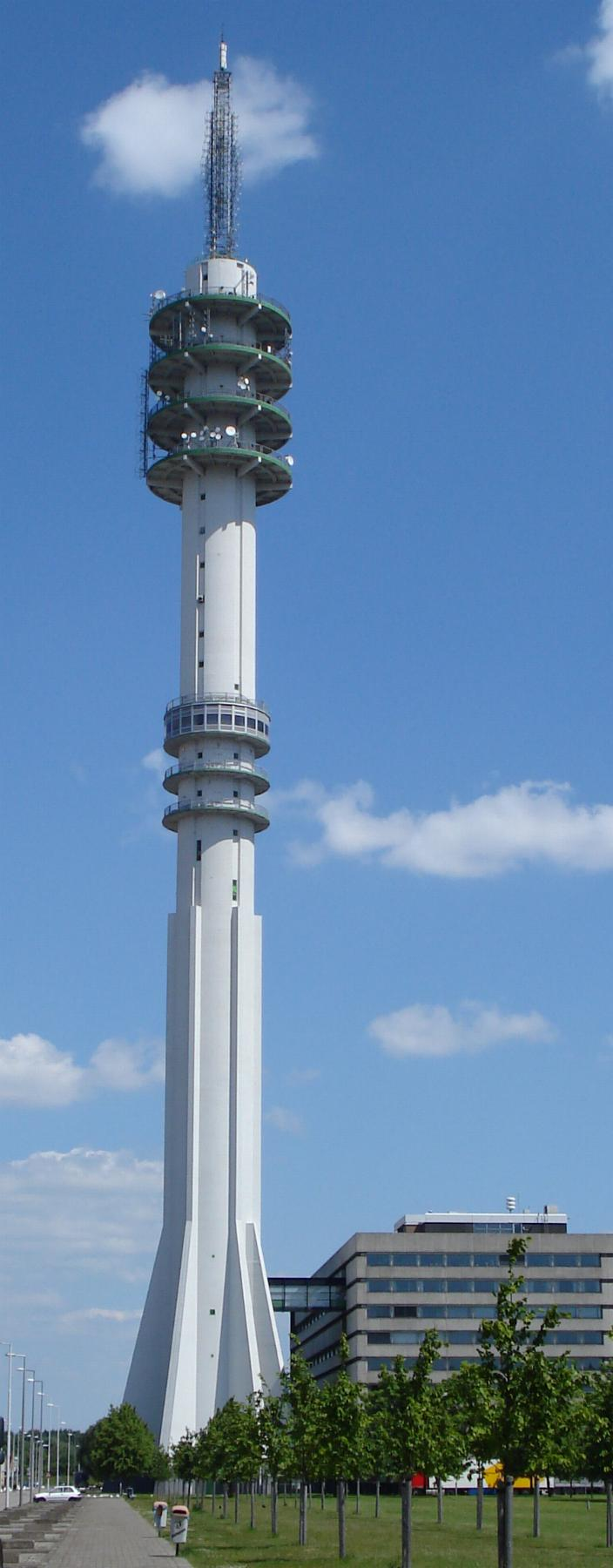
Communication Tower Rotterdam

The KPN-Zendmast Waalhaven, also known as Communication Tower, is a 191.5 metres (628 ft) self-supporting telecommunications tower located in Rotterdam in the Netherlands that was built in 1962. It is the tallest structure in Rotterdam and one of the tallest structures in the Netherlands. The tower is made of reinforced concrete with a metal transmitter at the top and at least one observation deck about halfway up.
