= Cabauw =

- Village
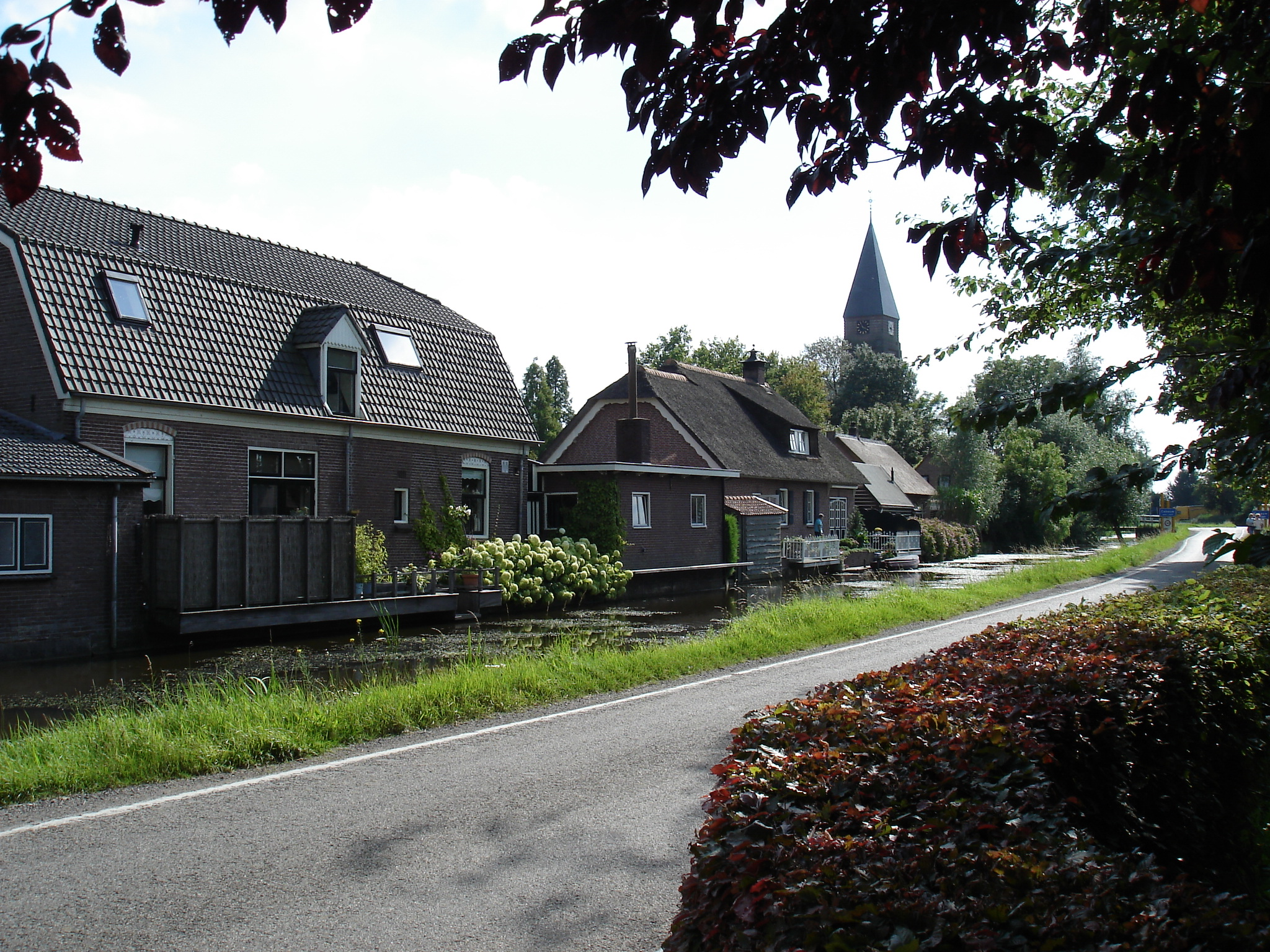
- Cabauw, with St. Jacob's church in the background

- Location in the Netherlands Cabauw (Netherlands)
- Coordinates: 51°57′52″N 4°53′54″E
- Country: Netherlands
- Province: Utrecht
- Municipality: Lopik

Area
  - Total: 0.89 km^{2} (0.34 sq mi)
- Elevation: 0.5 m (1.6 ft)

Population (2021)
  - Total: 775
  - Density: 870/km^{2} (2,300/sq mi)
- Time zone: UTC+1 (CET)
  - Summer (DST): UTC+2 (CEST)
- Postal code: 3411
- Dialing code: 0348

Cabauw is a village in the Dutch province of Utrecht. It is part of the municipality of Lopik, and lies about 12 km southwest of IJsselstein. Cabauw consists of a small village centre, and a ribbon of farms along the Lopikerwetering canal, between Zevender and Lopik.

Cabauw used to be a separate municipality. In 1857, it became a part of the municipality of Willige Langerak, which in its turn was merged into Lopik in 1943. Cabauw is and has long been a catholic enclave within a predominantly Protestant region.

== History ==
It was first mentioned in 1254 as inden Cabbau, and means dispute. The reason why the land was disputed is unknown. Cabauw is a linear settlement which started as a peat excavation concession. In 1840, it was home to 121 people. The Catholic church was built in 1928. The KNMI-mast Cabauw is a 213 metres (699 ft) tall meteorological tower from 1972 and is located near the village.

The wind mill Middelste Molen also known as Cabauwse Molen is a polder mill from 1773. It was a replacement of an earlier wind mill. There used to 41 polder mills in the polder, however the Middelste Molen is the only one remaining. In 1962, it was replaced by a Diesel powered pumping station, however it remained as a backup, and is still occasionally in service.

== Gallery ==
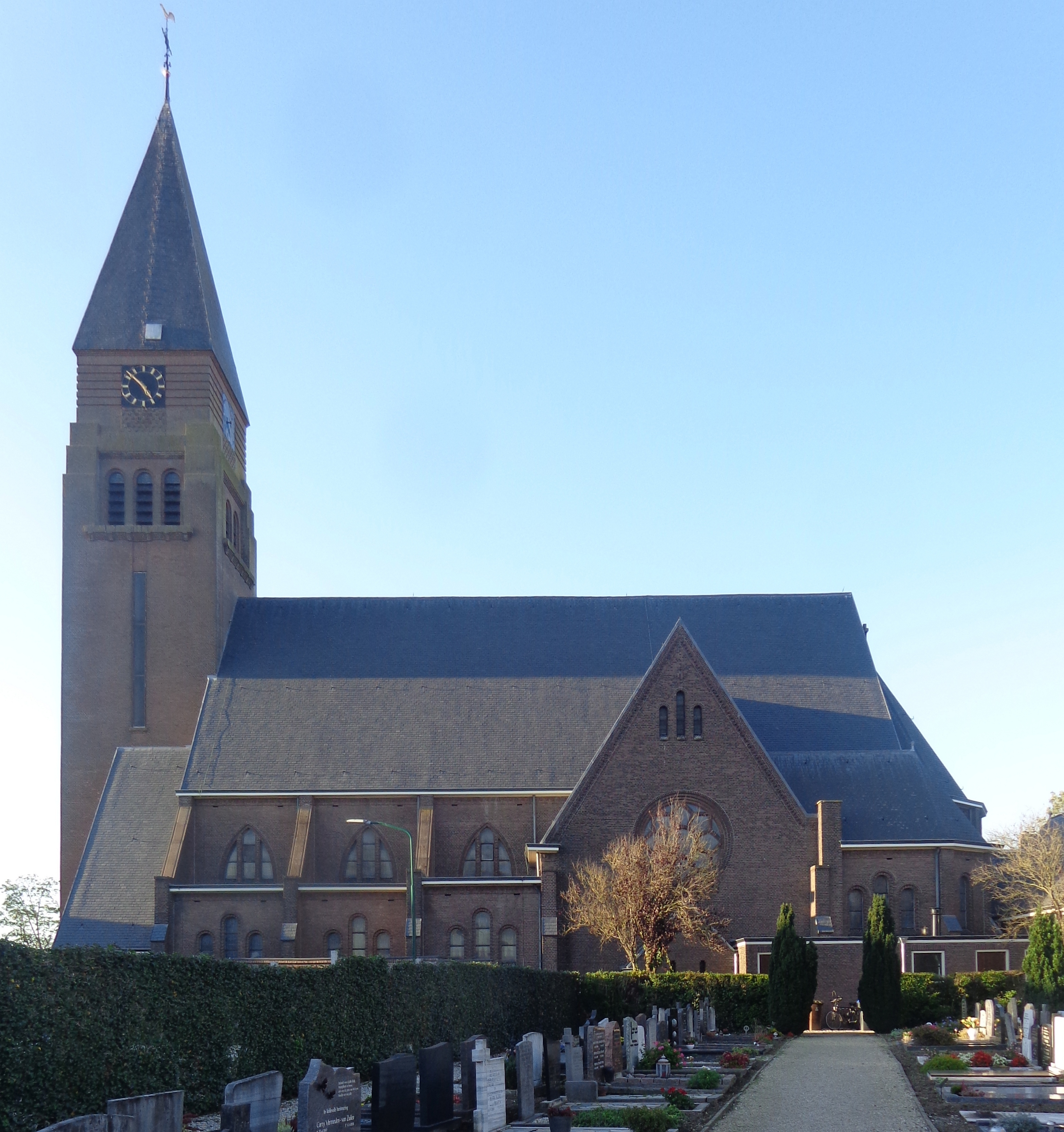
Church of Cabauw

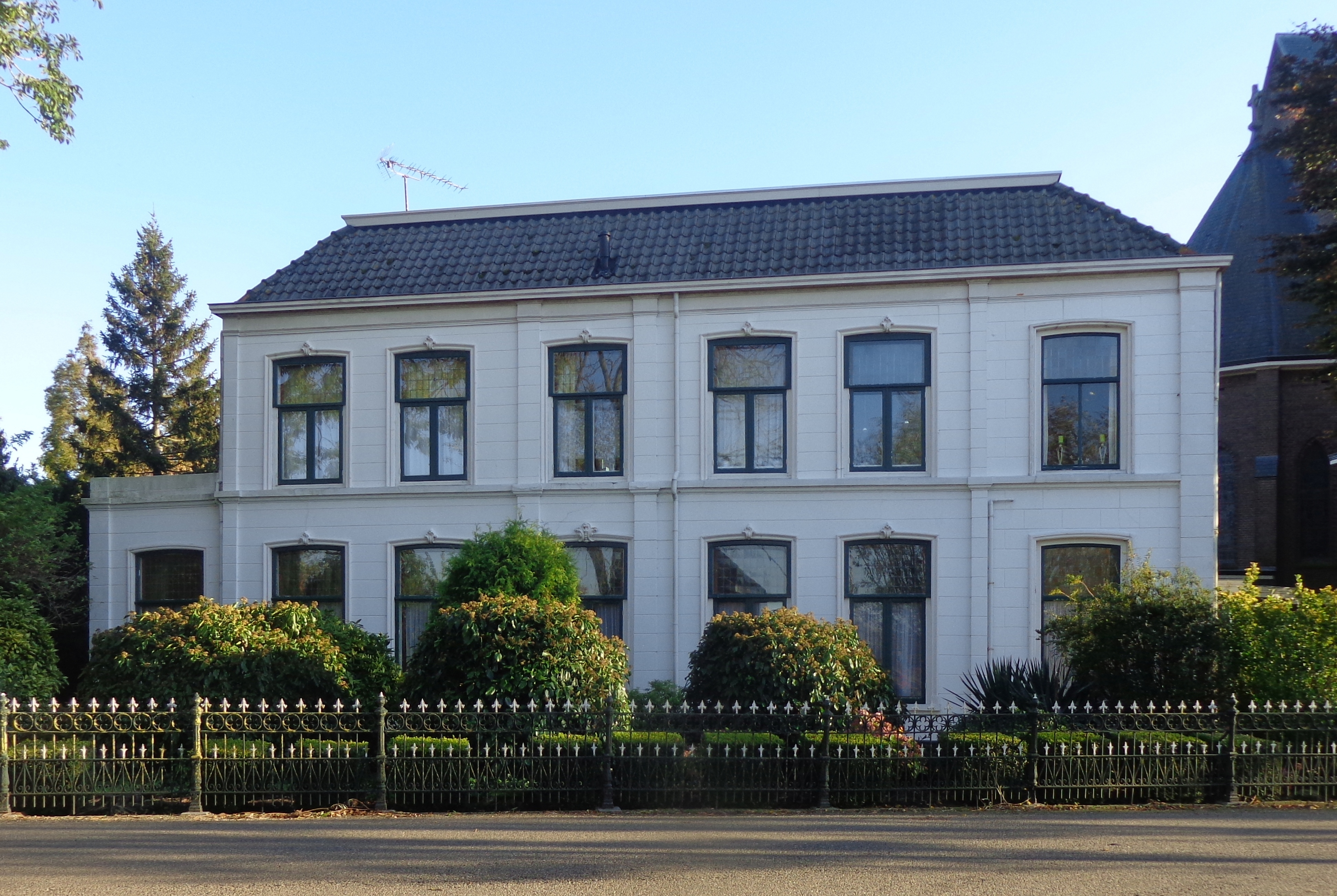
Clergy house

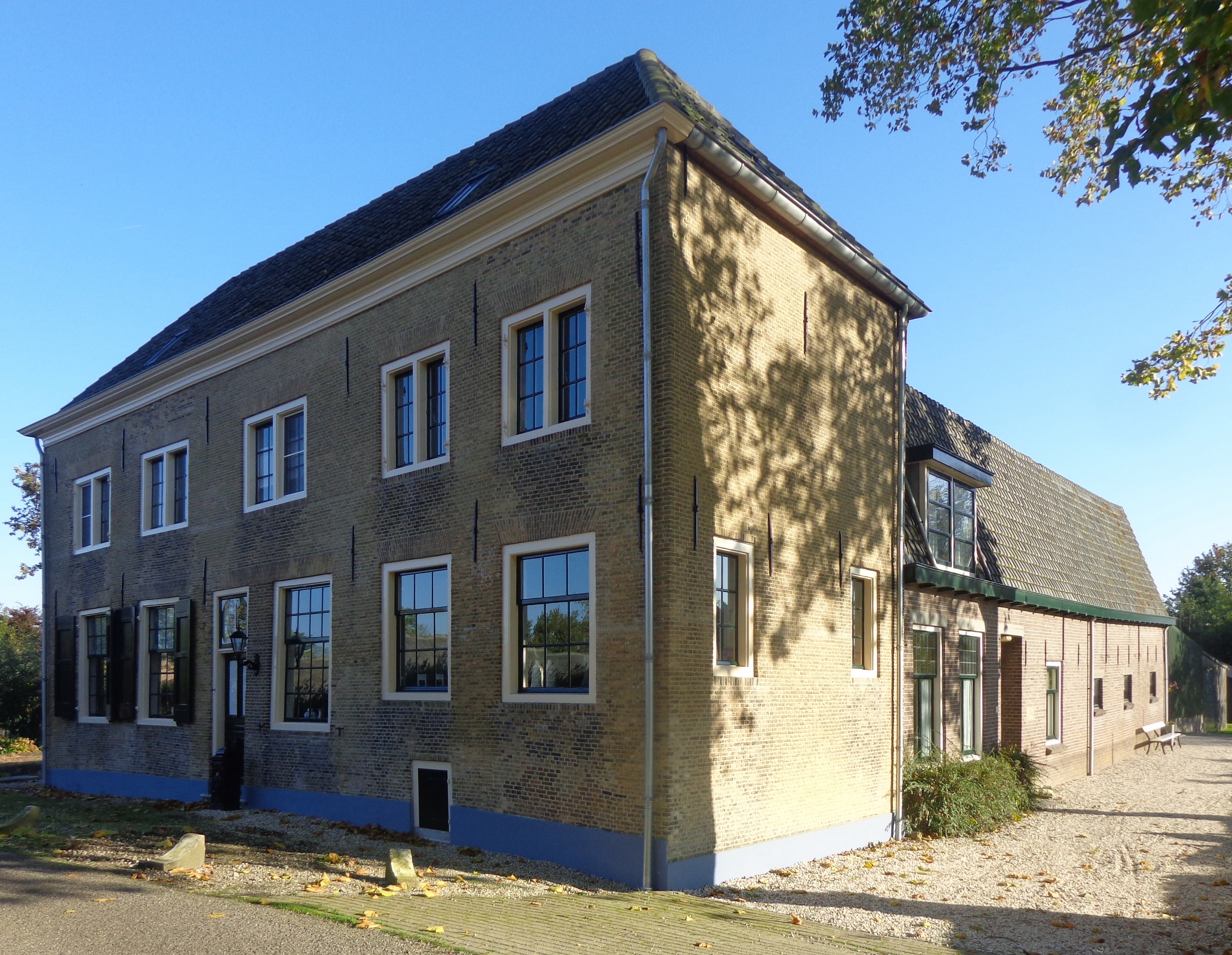
Farm Het Leeuwenhuis

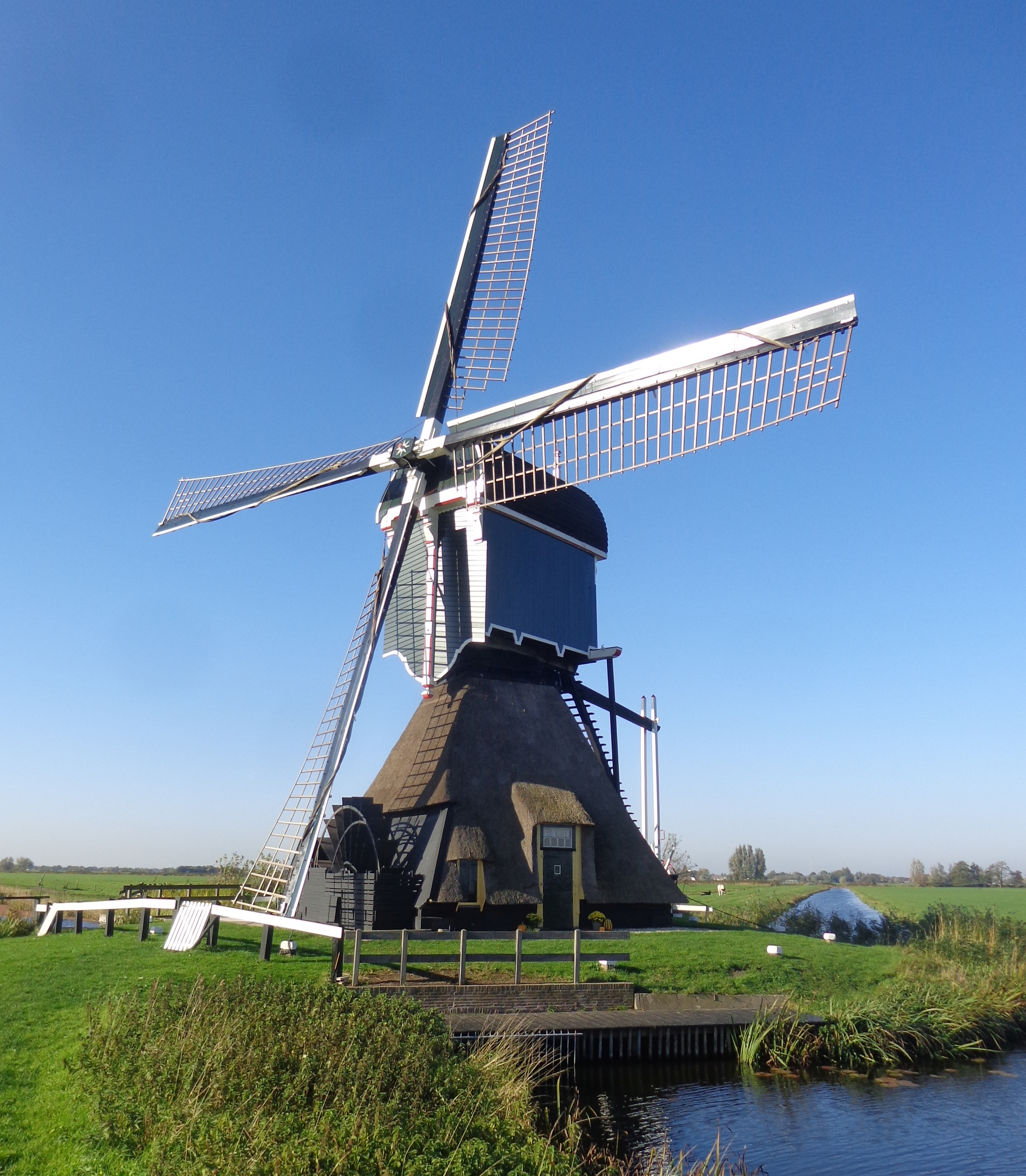
Windmill De Middelste Molen

== Climate ==
Climate data for Cabauw (1991−2020 normals, extremes 1986−present)
Month	Jan	Feb	Mar	Apr	May	Jun	Jul	Aug	Sep	Oct	Nov	Dec	Year
Record high °C (°F)	14.7 (58.5)	18.2 (64.8)	23.1 (73.6)	27.6 (81.7)	32.3 (90.1)	33.5 (92.3)	36.9 (98.4)	34.1 (93.4)	31.9 (89.4)	26.3 (79.3)	19.3 (66.7)	14.8 (58.6)	36.9 (98.4)
Mean daily maximum °C (°F)	6.0 (42.8)	6.9 (44.4)	10.3 (50.5)	14.5 (58.1)	18.0 (64.4)	20.6 (69.1)	22.8 (73.0)	22.7 (72.9)	19.3 (66.7)	14.7 (58.5)	9.8 (49.6)	6.5 (43.7)	14.3 (57.7)
Daily mean °C (°F)	3.5 (38.3)	3.8 (38.8)	6.3 (43.3)	9.6 (49.3)	13.3 (55.9)	16.0 (60.8)	18.1 (64.6)	17.8 (64.0)	14.8 (58.6)	10.9 (51.6)	7.0 (44.6)	4.1 (39.4)	10.4 (50.7)
Mean daily minimum °C (°F)	0.7 (33.3)	0.6 (33.1)	2.3 (36.1)	4.6 (40.3)	8.2 (46.8)	11.0 (51.8)	13.2 (55.8)	12.9 (55.2)	10.5 (50.9)	7.2 (45.0)	3.9 (39.0)	1.4 (34.5)	6.4 (43.5)
Record low °C (°F)	−15.4 (4.3)	−20.0 (−4.0)	−15.3 (4.5)	−4.7 (23.5)	−0.3 (31.5)	1.8 (35.2)	6.3 (43.3)	4.7 (40.5)	1.8 (35.2)	−6.0 (21.2)	−7.7 (18.1)	−12.9 (8.8)	−20.0 (−4.0)
Average precipitation mm (inches)	60.3 (2.37)	55.4 (2.18)	51.3 (2.02)	38.8 (1.53)	53.0 (2.09)	69.6 (2.74)	79.9 (3.15)	78.4 (3.09)	70.3 (2.77)	68.1 (2.68)	70.7 (2.78)	73.9 (2.91)	769.7 (30.30)
Average relative humidity (%)	88.2	85.8	81.9	77.0	75.9	77.7	78.6	80.2	83.8	86.6	90.1	90.1	83.0
Percentage possible sunshine	—	—	39.6	48.7	47.9	44.2	43.9	45.1	43.7	37.2	27.0	24.7	—
Source: Royal Netherlands Meteorological Institute
