= Hegyhátsál TV Tower =

Coordinates: 46°57′21″N 16°38′55″E

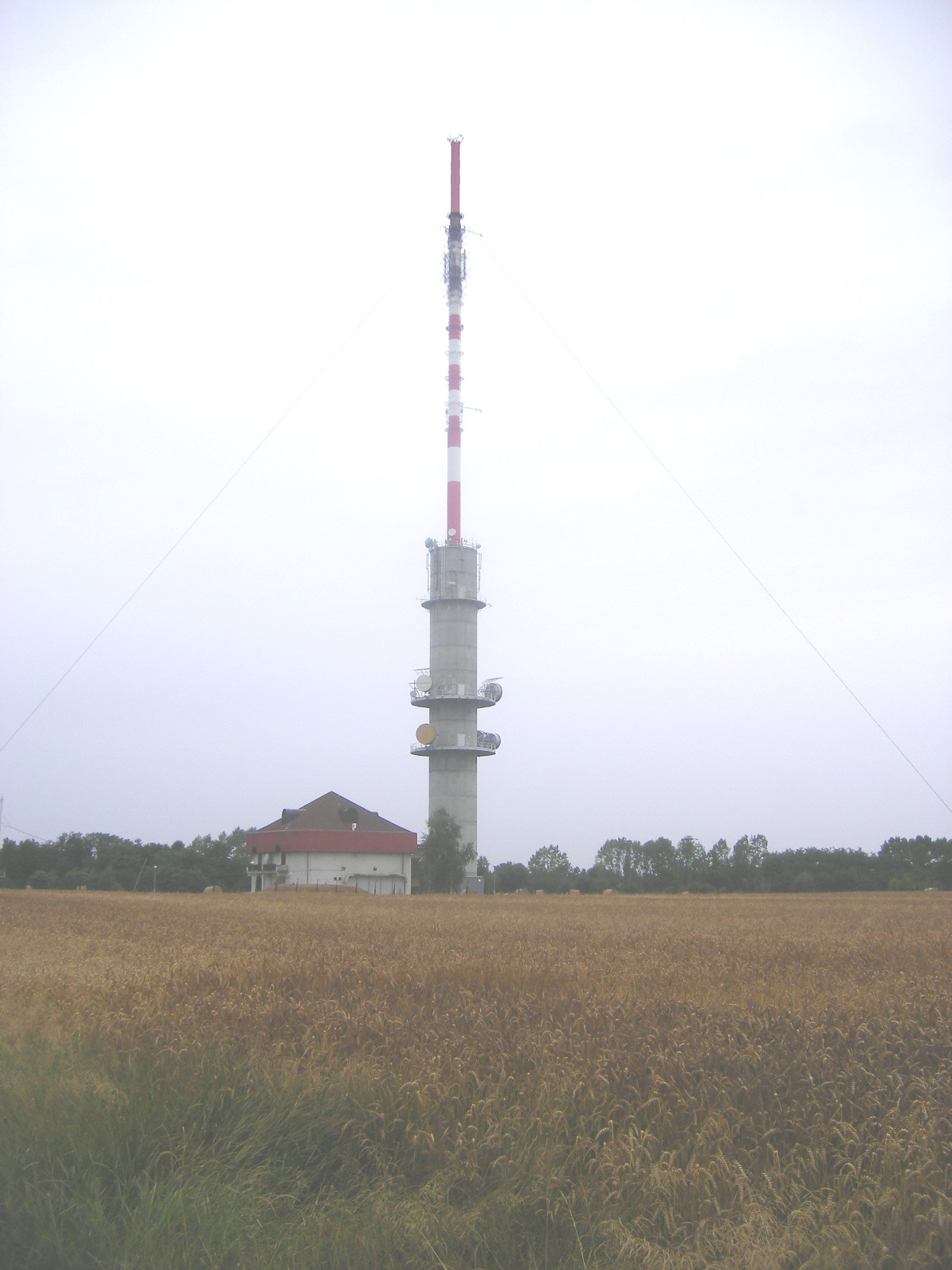

Hegyhátsál TV Tower is a 117-meter tall transmission tower near Hegyhátsál at Hungary at 46°57'21N and 16°39'08E. Hegyhátsál TV tower is a tower is one of the few partially guyed towers as it consists of a concrete tower as basement with a guyed mast on its top. Hegyhátsál TV Tower is not only used for FM- and TV-broadcasting, it carries also instruments for measuring the concentration of carbon dioxide; atmospheric measurements at the site began in 1993. Therefore, it carries corresponding devices 10, 48, 82 and 115 metres above ground. At the uppermost measuring sites also instruments for measuring wind speed, wind direction, temperature and air humidity are mounted on a 4.4 metre long arm.

== Transmitted programmes ==
=== FM ===
Transmitter	Frequency	ERP
MR 1 Kossuth Rádió	91.60 MHz	6,8 kW
MR 2 Petőfi Rádió	98.20 MHz	7,5 kW
Retro Rádió	101.2 MHz	1 kW
MR6 Dankó Rádió	103.60 MHz	5 kW
MR 3 Bartók Rádió	106.90 MHz	7,5 kW

=== TV ===
Transmitter	Channel-Number
mtv	33
TV2 - Kanal	46
