= Hegyhátsál =

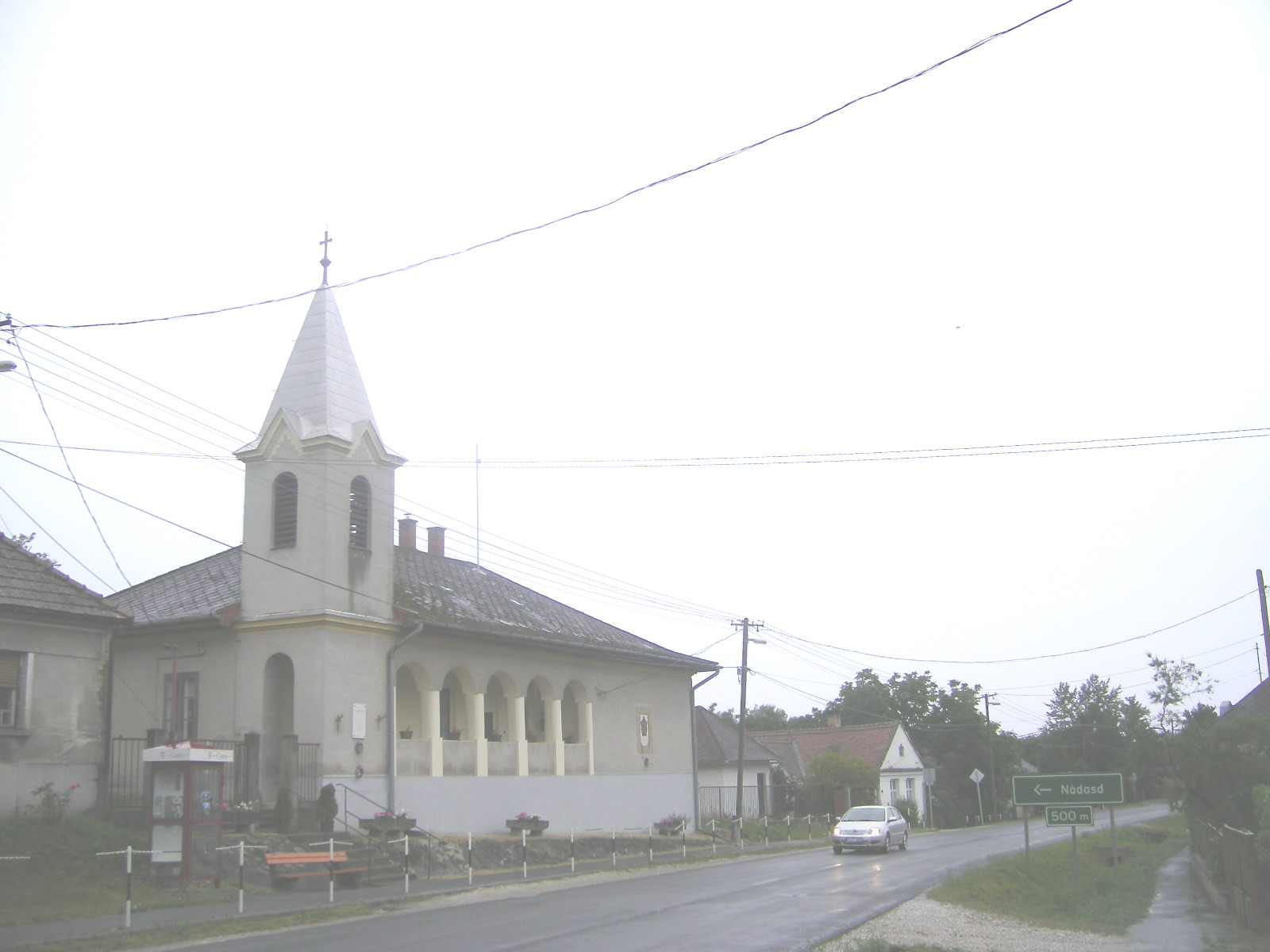
- Hegyhátsál, Heart of Jesus School Chapel

- Location of Hegyhátsál
- Coordinates: 46.95939°N 16.64163°E
- Country: Hungary
- County: Vas

Area
  - Total: 4.58 km^{2} (1.77 sq mi)

Population (2001)
  - Total: 171
  - Density: 37.34/km^{2} (96.7/sq mi)
- Time zone: UTC+1 (CET)
  - Summer (DST): UTC+2 (CEST)
- Postal code: 9915
- Area code: 94

Hegyhátsál is a village in Vas county, Hungary.

== Places of interest ==
- Hegyhát Observatory (Hegyhát Observatory Foundation)
- Hegyhátsál TV Tower
- Maria with her child
- Old village house
