= KCAP (design firm) =

- Type: Private
- Industry: Architecture, Urban Planning, Landscape Architecture
- Founded: 1989
- Founder: Kees Christiaanse
- Headquarters: Rotterdam, Netherlands
- Number of locations: Zürich, Rotterdam, Paris
- Key people: Xavier Blaringhem Jeroen Dirckx; Ruurd Gietema; Anouk Kuitenbrouwer; Irma van Oort; Ute Schneider Edward Schuurmans
- Number of employees: ~125 (as of 2022)
- Website: www.kcap.eu

KCAP is a Dutch-Swiss architecture, urban planning, and landscape architecture firm founded in 1989 by the urbanist, theorist, and design academic Kees Christiaanse in Rotterdam. The office is known for its comprehensive, multidisciplinary design approach to large-scale urban development and transformation. It operates internationally with offices in Rotterdam, Zürich, and Paris.

== History ==
Kees Christiaanse established KCAP after working with Rem Koolhaas at the Office for Metropolitan Architecture (OMA), where he was a partner from 1983 to 1989. In 2018, Christiaanse stepped back from daily operations, transitioning leadership to a new generation of seven partners: Xavier Blaringhem, Jeroen Dirckx, Ruurd Gietema, Anouk Kuitenbrouwer, Irma van Oort, Ute Schneider, and Edward Schuurmans.

== Philosophy ==
KCAP’s core philosophy emphasizes the creation of resilient, inclusive, and sustainable urban environments. Christiaanse has described architecture as a “social machine,” capable of generating safety and cohesion in urban settings. The firm is known for promoting “mixed communities” and the concept of the “open city,” advocating for integrated, adaptive reuse and layered urban strategies.

== Academic Engagement ==
The firm has strong ties with academia, with several of its partners actively involved in architectural and urban planning education. Christiaanse is Professor Emeritus of Urban Design at the ETH Zürich, where he led the Chair of Architecture and Urban Design until his retirement in 2022. He has published extensively on urban transformation, megaprojects, and the interface of design and policy. Schneider teaches at the Technical University of Vienna and regularly contributes to public discourse on resilient cities and urban densification. Kuitenbrouwer serves as a guest lecturer at ETH Zürich, contributing to research in landscape urbanism and adaptive reuse.

== Notable Projects ==
KCAP has contributed to numerous high-profile international projects:

- HafenCity, Hamburg – Europe’s largest inner-city development.
- The Red Apple, Rotterdam – A prominent high-rise along the Wijnhaven Island.
- Cruquius Island, Amsterdam – A waterfront residential redevelopment completed in 2024.
- Keflavík Airport Area Masterplan, Iceland – A strategic plan for economic diversification through clean energy and hydrogen infrastructure.
- Eurovea Towers, Bratislava – Slovakia’s tallest towers under construction, totaling 1,100 residences.

== Publications ==
The firm’s work is well-documented in books authored by Kees Christiaanse and collaborators:

- City as Loft: Adaptive Reuse as a Resource for Sustainable Urban Development (2013)
- The Grand Projet: Understanding the Making and Impact of Urban Megaprojects (2019)
- Textbook: Collected Texts on the Built Environment 1990–2018 (2018)
- Open City: Designing Coexistence (2009)
- Campus and the City: Urban Design for the Knowledge Society (2007)
- Situation: KCAP Architects & Planners (2005)

== See also ==
- OMA (architecture firm)
- MVRDV
- Wim Quist
- Francine Houben
- Herman Hertzberger
