= KNMI-mast Cabauw =

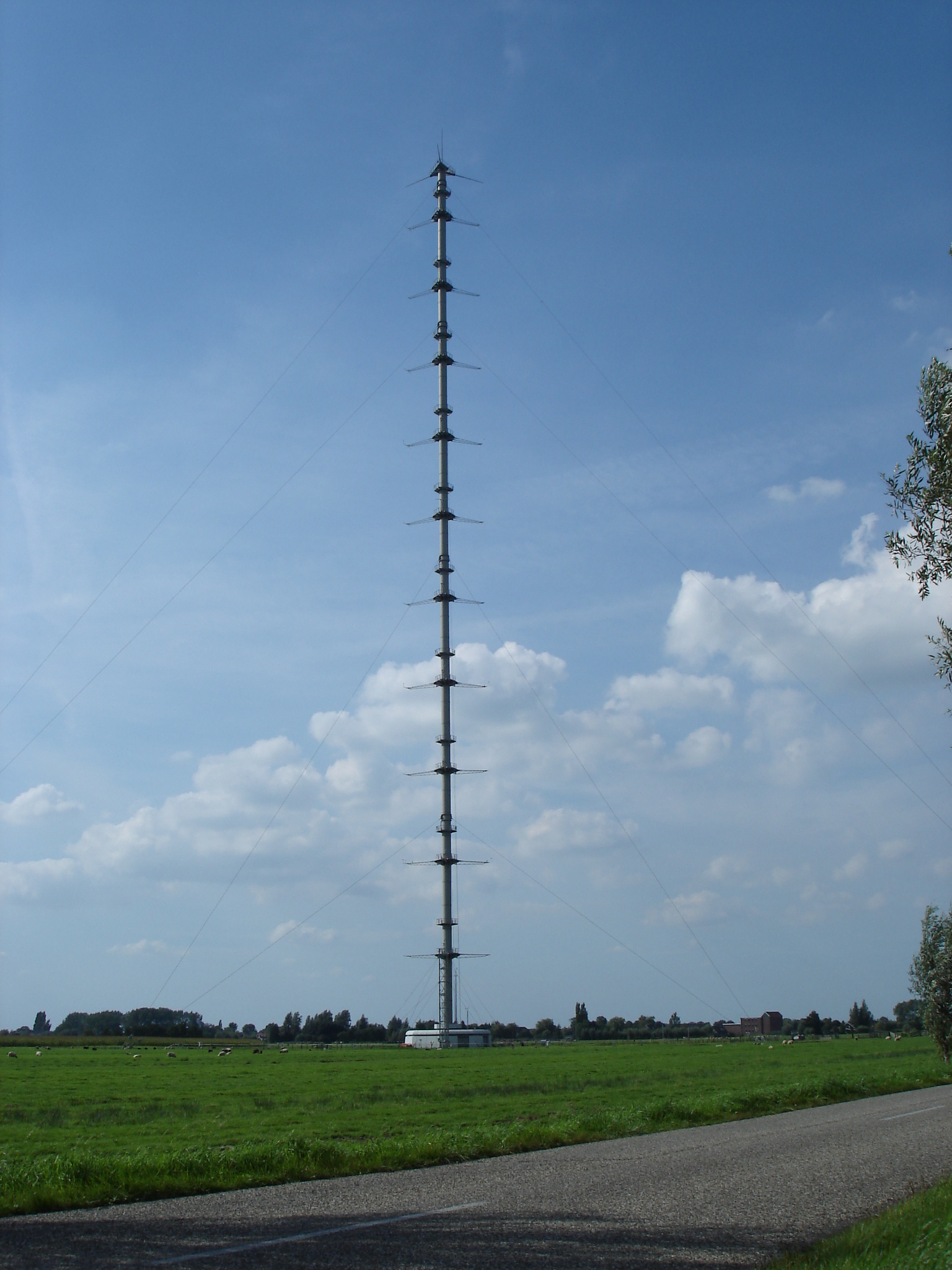
- KNMI-mast Cabauw

General information
- Status: Completed
- Type: Partially guyed tower
- Location: Cabauw, Netherlands
- Coordinates: 51°58′12.00″N 4°55′34.48″E
- Completed: 1972

Height
- Height: 213 m (699 ft)

The KNMI-mast Cabauw is a 213-metre (699 ft) high guyed mast for meteorological measurements at Cabauw, the Netherlands. In 1972 at Cabauw (06348) a 213 metres (699 ft) high mast was specifically built for meteorological research to establish relations between the state of the atmospheric boundary layer (ABL), land surface conditions and the general weather situation for all seasons. The Cabauw mast is located in the western part of the Netherlands (51.971 °N, 4.927 °E) in a polder 0.7 metres (28") below average sealevel. This site was chosen, because it is rather representative for this part of the Netherlands and because only minor landscape developments were planned in this region. However, significant changes are the removal of the trees along a road east of the mast in 1975, and the building of houses in the village of Lopik east of the mast in more recent years.

The North Sea is more than 50 km (31 mi) away to the WNW. The nearby region is agricultural, and surface elevation changes are at most a few metres (yards) over 20 km (12 mi). Within 40 km (25 mi) radius there are four major synoptic weather stations, among which is the regular radiosonde station at De Bilt (06260), ensuring a permanent supporting mesoscale network. Near the mast, the terrain is open pasture for at least 400 metres (yards) in all directions, and in the WSW direction for 2 km (1¼ miles). Farther away, the landscape is generally very open in the West sector, while the distant East sector is rather rough (windbreaks, orchards, low houses).

The distant North and South sectors are mixed landscapes, much pasture and some windbreaks. So the highest mast levels have in all directions a long fetch of landscape roughness which is usefully similar to the roughness observed in the lower surface layer. On the mast itself no undisturbed measurements can be made below 20 metres (66 ft). Therefore, auxiliary 20 metres (66 ft) masts are installed to the SE and the NW at sufficient distance from the mast foot building. South of the mast is a well-kept observation field for micrometeorological observations, including soil heat flux, soil temperatures and various radiation measurements; north of the mast is a spare observation field. The soil consists of 0.6 metres (2.0 ft) of river-clay, overlying a thick layer of peat. The water table is about 1 metre (3.3 ft) below the surface, but can be higher during wet periods.

The mast is a closed cylinder of 2 metres (6.6 ft) diameter, with an elevator inside. It is guyed at four levels, and carries booms at 20 metres (66 ft) intervals in three directions. The 9.4 metres (31 ft) booms can be swung up hydraulically, so that instruments at their ends can be handled from an upper balcony; this swivelling mounting allows much longer booms than the customary sideways-sliding construction. Permanent signal cables in the boom tubes run through the hollow swivel axis, so during boom motion they are only torsion-deformed, a more endurable load than bending. Built around the mast foot is a 200 m2 (2000 sq. ft.) streamlined building for registration and maintenance purposes. On top of the mast, a compact weather radar was installed in 2007, measuring precipitation up to a radius of 60 km (37 mi) around the mast.

== See also ==
- List of masts
