= Max Planck Institute for Biogeochemistry =

Institute in the Max Planck Society located in Jena, Germany

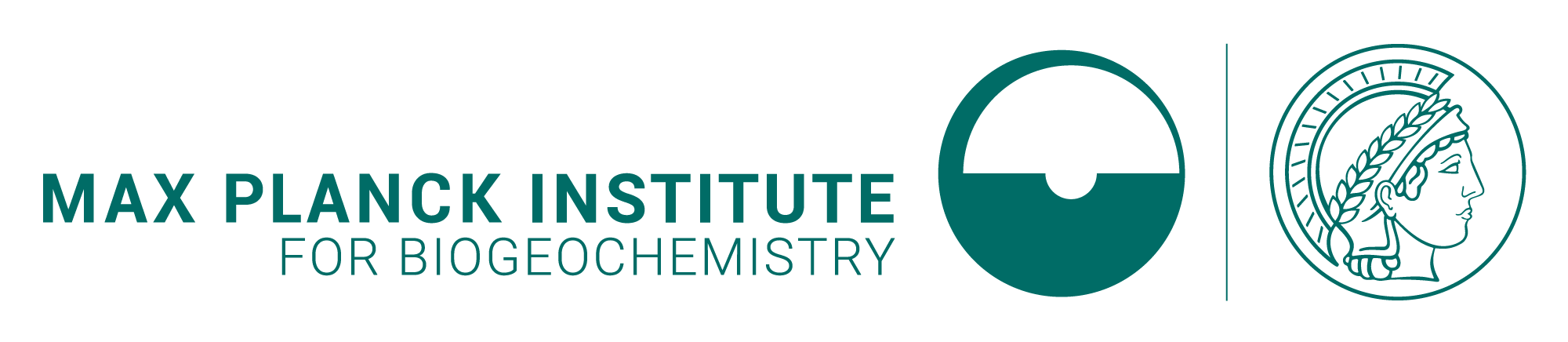
Institute logo

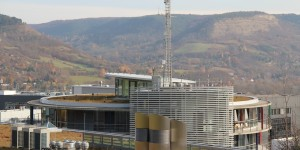
MPI for Biogeochemistry, weather station

The Max Planck Institute for Biogeochemistry is located in Jena, Germany. It was created in 1997, and moved into new buildings 2002 on the city's Beutenberg Campus. It is part of the Max Planck Society (Max Planck Gesellschaft).

== Scientific profile ==
The research at the Max Planck Institute for Biogeochemistry is dedicated to the study of global biogeochemical cycles and their long-term interactions with the biosphere, the atmosphere, the geosphere and the entire climate system.

== Departments and research groups ==
The institute has three departments, with each department consisting of several research groups, and sometimes additional project groups.

The departments are:

- Biogeochemical Processes (director: Susan Trumbore)
- Biogeochemical Signals (director: Sönke Zaehle)
- Biogeochemical Integration (director: Markus Reichstein)

The former department head and founding director, Ernst-Detlef Schulze, conducts research as head of the Independent Emeritus Group Carbon Balance, Ecosystem Research and Forest Management. The former department head Martin Heimann is an active member of the research project QArctic in the Department Biogeochemical Signals.

== International Max Planck Research School for global Biogeochemical Cycles ==
The International Max Planck Research School for Global Biogeochemical Cycles is a graduate school dedicated to training doctoral students in the field of global biogeochemical cycles and related Earth system sciences. The doctoral program is jointly operated by the MPI for Biogeochemistry and the Friedrich Schiller University of Jena and offers a comprehensive training program that also includes a research stay abroad lasting several months.
