= Dennis Kois =

Dennis Kois is the executive director of the Yerkes Future Foundation and Yerkes Observatory in Williams Bay, Wisconsin.

== Biography ==
Kois graduated from Whitefish Bay High School in Whitefish Bay, Wisconsin near Milwaukee, and completed a BA at the University of Wisconsin–Milwaukee and an MA from New York University. He lectured in the Graduate Program in Museum Studies at George Washington University from 2001 to 2006.

Kois co-designed the Galleries of Greek and Roman Art installed in 1999 at the Metropolitan Museum of Art, as well as co-designed museum exhibitions, including the Met's Jacqueline Kennedy: The White House Years. He was a protégé of Jeff Daly, the Chief Designer of the Metropolitan from 1979 to 2006. Additionally, Kois was the internal art director of the Met's website redesign, metmuseum.org, when it launched in 2000. The redesign won the "Best Website" award from the American Alliance of Museums and "Best E-Commerce Site" award from Advertising Age.

In 2001 Kois became the Chief Designer of the Freer Gallery of Art and Arthur M. Sackler Gallery, Smithsonian Institution. From 2001 to 2006 he designed many exhibitions, including costume exhibition with "Style and Status".{CN}

In 2006 Kois became the executive director of The Grace Museum, in Abilene, Texas. A two-year term appointed to the Texas Commission on the Arts visual arts panel in 2007 followed.

In June 2008, Kois became the director of the DeCordova Museum and Sculpture Park in Lincoln, Massachusetts. Kois was widely credited in the media with re-invigorating the deCordova’s fundraising and program, commissioning or acquiring major sculptures by Antony Gormley, Andy Goldsworthy, Ursula von Rydingsvard and other major international artists for the park.

In 2014 Kois became President and CEO of the Milwaukee Public Museum, a then 140 year old institution of natural history, science, and culture with a draw of half a million annually; the highest in its history. A new museum building was announced . The Kois' filed for divorce in early 2018. The Museum Board investigated a relationship between Kois and a junior staff member that raised concerns about an abuse of power. Kois resigned in August 2018.

Kois joined the Burchfield Penney Art Center as executive director in 2019; the Center announced several major donations, including a $1.22 million gift in 2020 in support of family engagement and education. It was the largest gift received by the Burchfield in the past decade.

In February 2021 Kois was announced as the new executive director and first employee of the Yerkes Future Foundation, responsible for the fundraising, conservation and future vision for the historic Yerkes Observatory and its 50 acres of Olmsted-designed grounds. The observatory, still home to the largest refracting telescope in the world, is widely considered a landmark of modern science.

Between 2021 and 2023 the Yerkes Future Foundation raised $20 million towards the restoration of the observatory and a reimagining of its mission as home to a mix of research, science, arts and culture. In 2022 Yerkes announced the hiring of astronomer Dr. Amanda Bauer as the Montgomery Foundation Deputy Director, and re-opened to the public for tours and events. In 2023 the Observatory brought in a range of speakers and performers, including Nobel Laureate Dr. John Mather, four-time Grammy winners Eighth Blackbird, former US Poet Laureate and Pulitzer prizewinner Tracy K. Smith, and NPR science personality Dean Regas. A commissioned sculpture envisioning space-time by Brooklyn, New York artist Ashley Zelinskie was installed in 2023, along with four miles of hiking trails. In 2024 Yerkes announced it had raised more than a half-million dollars for a STEM playground called Play/Space, and launched a crowdfunding campaign to raise additional funds.
