= Aerospace Test and Development Show =

- Aerospace Test and Development Show logo

- Location of the event in France Aerospace Test and Development Show (France)
- Date: Yearly in September
- Time: (GMT+2)
- Venue: MEETT site (exhibition centre)
- Location: Toulouse, France; 43.665593144094785°N 1.35506044981028°E
- Type: Exhibition
- Motive: Exhibition and conference on aerospace testing and development
- Participants: 140+ exhibitors
- Website: aerotestdevelopmentshow.com

Aerospace Test and Development Show is world's largest exhibition and conference on aerospace testing and development. Its held annually in MEETT, Toulouse, France.

The exhibition is related to aircraft, urban and inter-urban passenger drone, helicopter, space and air-defense testing and development.

== Event(s) ==
The inaugural event was held in 2023, in MEETT, Toulouse, France.

== See also ==
- Bauma, world's largest trade fair
