= New Museum =

Museum in New York City

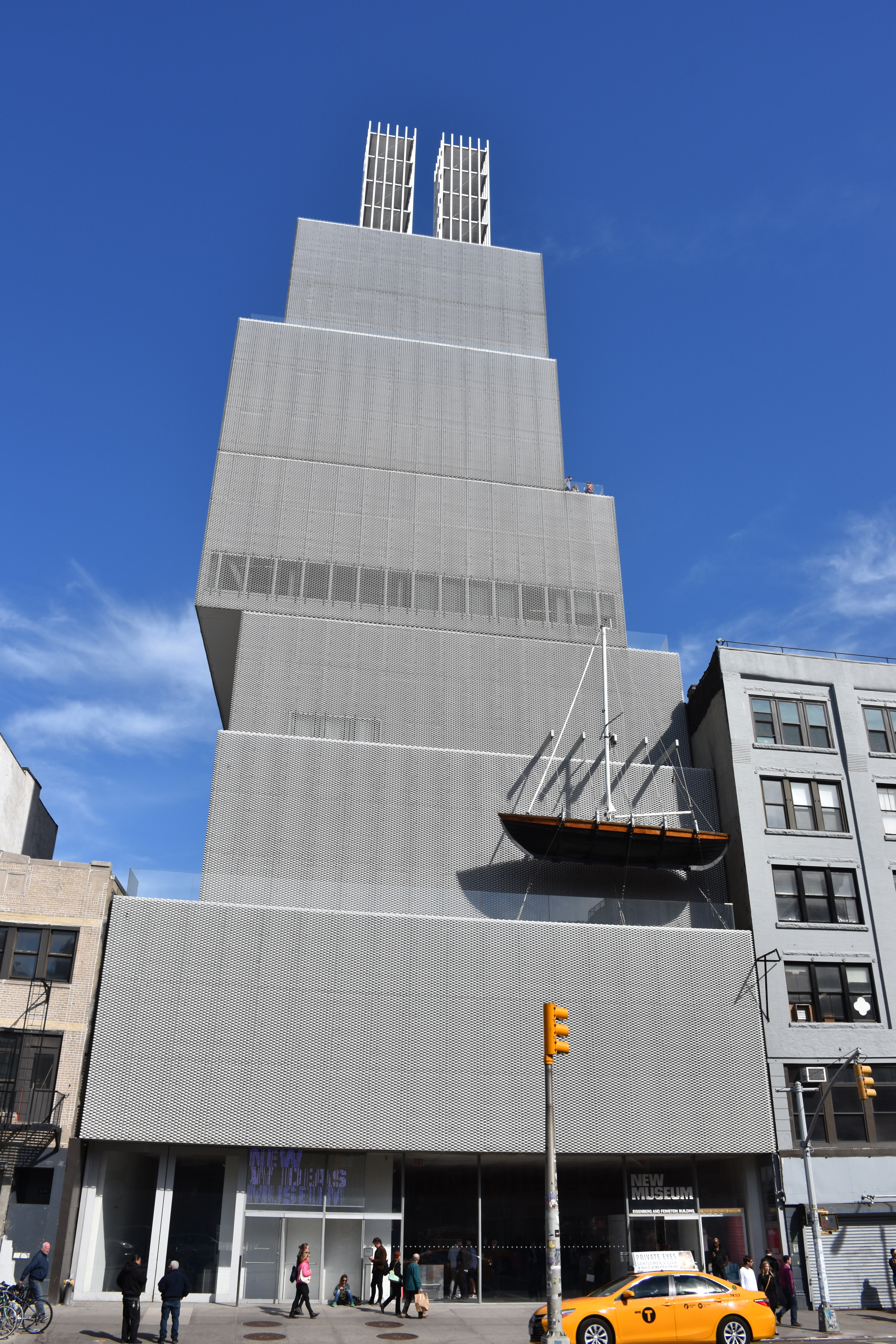
- Established: 1977
- Location: 235 Bowery; Manhattan, New York City, New York 10002; United States
- Coordinates: 40.722239°N 73.993219°W
- Type: Contemporary art
- Director: Lisa Phillips
- Curators: Gary Carrion-Murayari; Massimiliano Gioni; Margot Norton; Vivian Crockett
- Public transit access: Bus: M103; Subway: at Second Avenue, at Bowery
- Website: www.newmuseum.org

The New Museum of Contemporary Art is a museum at 235 Bowery, on the Lower East Side of Manhattan in New York City. It was founded in 1977 by Marcia Tucker.

== History ==
The museum originally opened in a space in the Graduate Center of the then-named New School for Social Research at 65 Fifth Avenue. The New Museum remained there until 1983, when it rented and moved to the first two and a half floors of the Astor Building at 583 Broadway in the SoHo neighborhood.

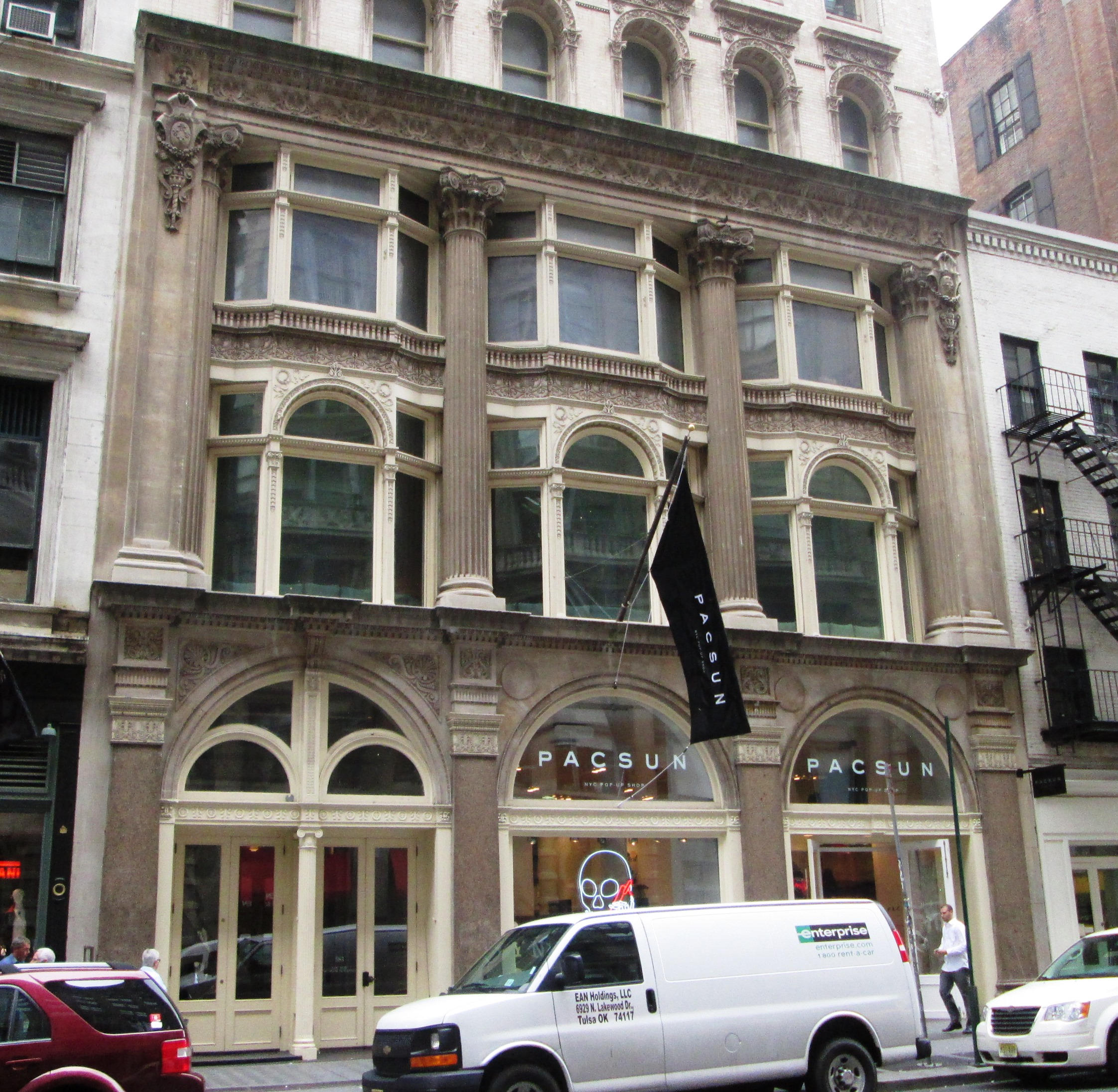
583 Broadway

In 2001, the museum rented 7,000 square feet of space on the first floor of the Chelsea Art Museum on West 22nd Street for a year.

The New Museum has exhibited artists from Argentina, Brazil, Bulgaria, Cameroon, China, Chile, Colombia, Cuba, Germany, India, Poland, Spain, South Africa, Turkey, and the United Kingdom among many other countries. In 2003, the New Museum formed an affiliation with Rhizome, a leading online platform for global new media art.

In 2005, the museum was among 406 New York City arts and social service institutions to receive part of a $20 million grant from the Carnegie Corporation, which was made possible through a donation by New York City mayor Michael Bloomberg.

=== Core value ===
The New Museum was established by an independent curator Marcia Tucker in 1977. It is dedicated to introducing new art and new ideas, by artists who have not yet received significant exposure or recognition. Ever since it was founded, the museum has taken on the mission to challenge the stiff institutionalization of an art museum. It continues to bring new ideas into the art world and to connect with the public.

=== New location (2007 to present) ===
On December 1, 2007, the New Museum opened the doors to its new $50 million location at 235 Bowery, between Stanton and Rivington Streets. The seven-story 58,700-square-foot facility, designed by the Tokyo-based firm Sejima + Nishizawa/SANAA and the New York-based firm Gensler, has greatly expanded the museum's exhibitions and space.

SANAA's design is chosen because it is in accord with the museum's mission—the flexibility of the building, its changeable atmosphere corresponds to the ever-changing nature of contemporary art. Its decision to put a stack of white boxes on the Bowery was in response to the gentrification of the neighborhood.

In April 2008, the museum's new building was named one of the architectural New Seven Wonders of the World by Conde Nast Traveler. The New Museum has been a landmark of the Bowery district. “Bowery embraces idiosyncrasy in an unprejudiced manner and we were determined to make the museum building feel like that”, as one of the directors of the museum puts it. The neighborhood appears to be a confrontation with the image of downtown Manhattan—a spirit that the New Museum always sees itself searching for.

The Bowery location has gallery and events space, plus a Resource Center with books and computers for access to their main web site and digital archive. The New Museum Digital Archive is an online resource that provides accessibility to primary sources from exhibitions, publications, and programs. The archive holds 7,500 written and visual materials for artists and researchers to access. The New Museum Digital Archive's database is searchable through 4,000 artists, curators, and organizations connected to New Museum exhibitions, performances, and publications.

==== Expansion (2008-2025) ====
The museum bought the neighboring building at 231 Bowery in 2008. The New Museum announced plans for an expansion on the site in 2016 after raising $43 million of an $80 million capital campaign; the museum later increased its capital fundraising goal to $125 million. The New Museum and hired OMA to design an expansion at that location in 2017. Plans for the expansion were publicized in 2019, at which point the expansion was to cost $63 million. The expansion would have seven floors (at the same heights as the 2007 building's floors) and 60,000 square feet (5,600 m^{2}) of gallery space. It would contain a glass-and-metal facade and an atrium, and there would be an elevator and stair on the expansion exterior. The expansion was to be named for Toby Devan Lewis, who donated $20 million for its construction. The New York Times described the new New Museum expansion as emphasizing "transparency and upward movement".

Initially, the expansion was to be completed in 2022, but construction did not even start until then. The museum building closed in March 2024 so the expansion could be completed. During the building's closure, museum staff hosted walking tours, as well as discussions with panels of artists. The expansion topped out in November 2024, and the museum announced in February 2025 that the museum would reopen later that year. The reopening date was then delayed to March 21, 2026. The expansion would allow the museum to double its exhibition space. Oberon Group and Julia Sherman were also hired to operate a full-service restaurant in the new building's ground floor.

A press preview of the new building, designed by Shohei Shigematsu and Rem Koolhaas of OMA, with executive architect Cooper Robertson, was held on March 18, 2026. The opening exhibition was New Humans: Memories of the Future. The new New Museum building officially opened on March 21, 2026. The New Museum opened Oberon, a restaurant and bar, inside the Bowery expansion in July 2026.

=== Unionization ===
On January 24, 2019, eligible employees at the New Museum voted 38–8 to unionize, with a plan to join NewMuU-UAW Local 2110. Asked for their reasons for unionizing, the New Museum employees said, “As the New Museum Union, we ask, above all, that these ideals be mirrored in the museum's working conditions, hiring practices, wages, and benefits. We believe that fair compensation and transparency for all workers throughout the museum is essential to ensuring its diversity, reducing turnover, and strengthening the New Museum community: salaries, wages, and benefits at the museum must be sustainable for everyone, regardless of the privileges afforded them by race, class, or gender.”

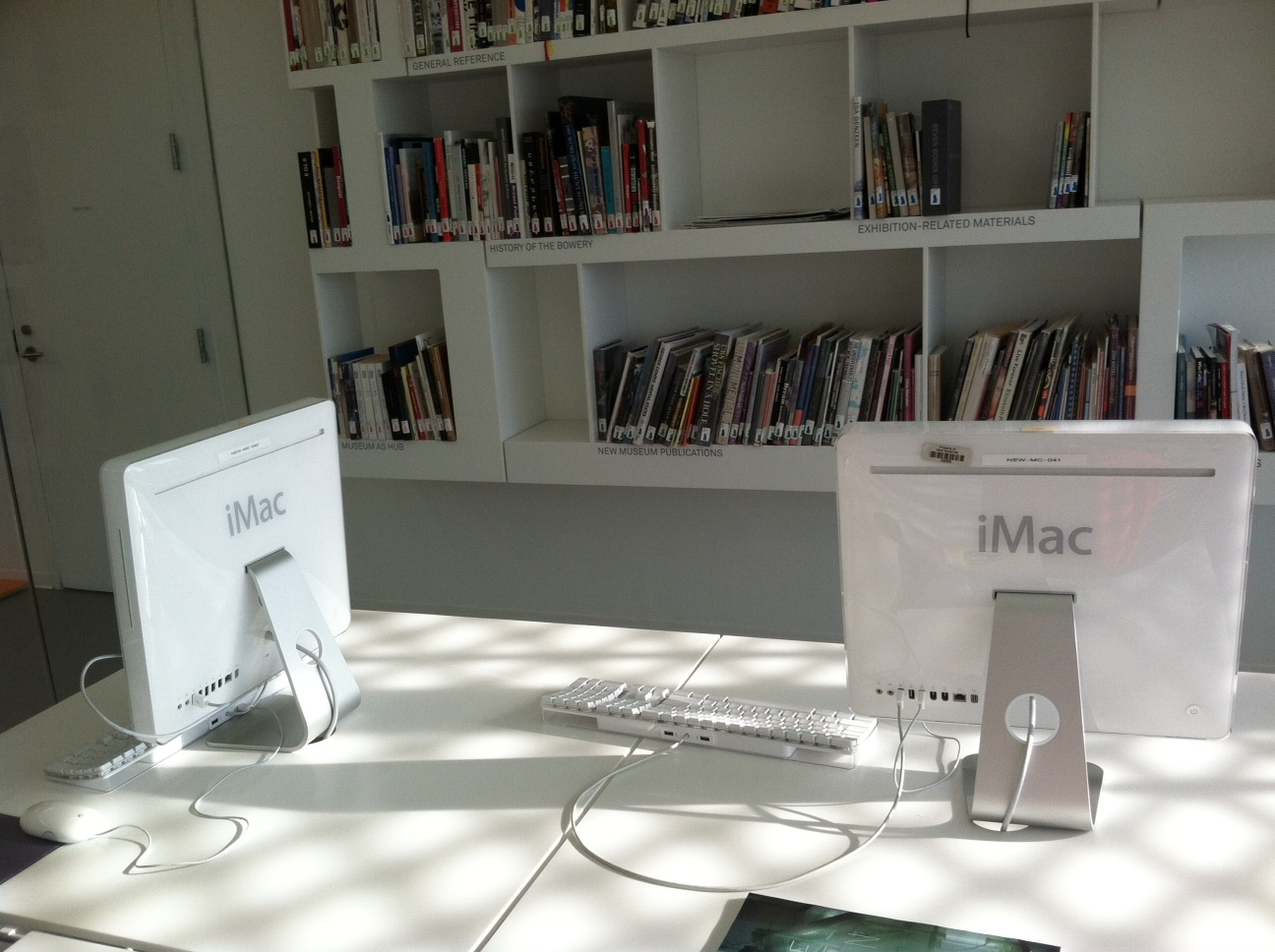
Resource Center

== Collection ==
When she founded the museum, Marcia Tucker decided it should buy and sell works every decade so that the collection would always be new. The plan was never carried out. In 2000, the museum accepted its first corporate donation of artworks. The museum then held a modest collection of about 1,000 works in many media. In 2004, it joined forces with the Museum of Contemporary Art, Chicago and the Hammer Museum in Los Angeles in raising $110,000 from two foundations -- $50,000 from the American Center Foundation and $60,000 from the Peter Norton Family Foundation—to help pay for commissioning, buying, and exhibiting the work of emerging young artists. As of 2021, the New Museum has been a non-collecting institution.

== Exhibitions and the Triennial ==
The museum presents the work of under-recognized artists, mounting surveys of Ana Mendieta, William Kentridge, David Wojnarowicz, Paul McCarthy and Andrea Zittel before they received widespread public recognition. In 2003, the New Museum presented the highly regarded exhibition Black President: The Art and Legacy of Fela Anikulapo-Kuti.

The museum organized The Generational: Younger Than Jesus, curated by Massimiliano Gioni, in 2009 which went on to become the first edition of its exhibition series the "New Museum Triennial". Subsequently, the museum held the second and third editions of its Triennial, respectively; "The Ungovernables" (2012 – curated by Eungie Joo) and "Surround Audience" (2015 – curated by Lauren Cornell and Ryan Trecartin).

Margot Norton has organized exhibitions, including one by Turner Prize-winner Laure Prouvost and the museum solo of Judith Bernstein.

The museum hosted a show on July 20, 2016, called "The Keeper". With over 4,000 objects from more than two dozen collectors, it presented object lessons about the process of collecting.

In March 2023, it was announced that Vivian Crockett and Isabella Rjeille will co-curate the 6th edition of the New Museum Triennial in 2026.

=== Past exhibitions ===
- Hans Haacke: All Connected (October 24, 2019 to January 26, 2020)
- Marianna Simnett: Blood In My Milk (April 9, 2018 to June 1, 2019)
- Petrit Halilaj: RU (September 27, 2017 to January 7, 2018)
- Raymond Pettibon: A Pen of All Work (??? to April 9, 2017)
- Pipilotti Rist: Pixel Forest (October 26, 2016 to January 15, 2017)
- My Barbarian: The Audience is Always Right (September 28, 2016 to January 8, 2017)
- Surround Audience triennial (February 25, 2015 to May 24, 2015)
- Niv Acosta: Discotropic (February 25, 2015 to May 24, 2015)
- Night and Day: Chris Ofili (October 29, 2014 to February 1, 2015)
- Christen Clifford: Wolf Woman performance (2014)
- Lili Reynaud-Dewar: LIVE THROUGH THAT?! (October 15, 2014 to January 25, 2015)
- Here and Elsewhere (July 16, 2014 to September 28, 2014)
- Pawel Althamer: The Neighbors (February 12, 2014 to April 13, 2014)
- Laure Prouvost: For Forgetting (February 12, 2014 to April 13, 2014)
- Report on the Construction of a Spaceship Module (January 22, 2014 to April 13, 2014)
- Occupied Territory: A New Museum Trilogy (January 22, 2014 to April 13, 2014)
- Chris Burden: Extreme Measures (October 2, 2013 to January 12, 2014)
- Ghosts in the Machine (July 18, 2012 to September 30, 2012)
- The Ungovernables triennial (February 15, 2012 to April 22, 2012)
- Carsten Höller: Experience (October 26, 2011 to January 22, 2012)
- Ostalgia (July 7, 2011 to September 2, 2011)
- Rivane Neuenschwander: A Day Like Any Other (June 23, 2010 to September 19, 2010)
- Younger than Jesus triennial (April 8, 2009 to July 12, 2009)
- Live Forever: Elizabeth Peyton (October 8, 2008 to January 11, 2009)
- Unmonumental: The Object in the 21st Century (December 1, 2007 to March 30, 2008)

== Other programs ==
=== Rhizome ===
Rhizome, a not-for-profit arts organization that supports and provides a platform for new media art, has been an affiliate organization of New Museum since 2003. Today, Rhizome's programs include events, exhibitions at the New Museum and elsewhere, an active website, and an archive of more than 2,000 new media artworks.

=== NEW INC ===
NEW INC, the first museum-led incubator, is a shared workspace and professional development program designed to support creative practitioners working in the areas of art, technology, and design. Conceived by the New Museum in 2013, the incubator is a not-for-profit platform that furthers the museum's ongoing commitment to new art and new ideas. Launched in summer 2014, NEW INC provides a collaborative space for an interdisciplinary community of one hundred members to investigate new ideas and develop a sustainable practice.

NEW INC was initially housed in the building next door to the New Museum, purchased by the museum in 2008. During construction on New Museum's expansion beginning in 2022, NEW INC operated from a temporary workspace until the museum reopened in 2026, with a permanent home located it the new New Museum building designed by OMA.

In 2020 NEW INC announced the creation of ONX Studio (now known as Onassis ONX Studio), a mixed reality lab and accelerator co-created with the Onassis Foundation, to be led by NEW INC's Director Stephanie Pereira and New Museum's Deputy Director, Karen Wong. In 2025, following successful partnerships with BAM and Tribeca Film Festival, Onassis ONX announced that it would be opening a new, expanded space in lower Manhattan.

NEW INC alumni include Martin Adolfsson, Erica Gorochow, Anders Sandell, Lisa Park, Kevin Siwoff, Kunal Gupta, Justin Cone, Jonathan Harris, Joe Doucet, Greg Hochmuth, Luisa Pereira, Nitzan Hermon, Tristan Perich, Sougwen Chung, Philip Sierzega, Paul Soulellis, Charlie Whitney, Binta Ayofemi, Ashley Zelinskie and Emilie Baltz. NEW INC's founding director was Julia Kaganskiy. Kaganskiy was succeeded by Stephanie Pereira who led the program for three years, followed by Salome Asega has led NEW INC since 2021. Notable projects from NEW INC include minutiae, described by the Financial Times as an "'anti-social' photo app" offering "an antidote to Instagram and Facebook."

=== Awards and Funds ===
In 2008, art dealer Barbara Gladstone initiated the formation of the Stuart Regen Visionaries Fund at the New Museum, established in honor of her late son and renowned art dealer. The gift supported a new series of public lectures and presentations by cultural visionaries, the Visionaries Series, which debuted in 2009 and features prominent international thinkers in the fields of art, architecture, design and contemporary culture. In 2020 the series shifted to focus on first-ever public conversations between leading figures, with Claudia Rankine and Judith Butler (2020) and Jeremy O Harris and Arthur Jafa (2021). Previous speakers included author Rachel Kushner (2018, in conversation with novelist Ben Lerner); explorer Erling Kagge (2017); essayist and critic Fran Lebowitz (2016, in conversation with filmmaker Martin Scorsese); critic and author Hilton Als (2015); director, screenwriter, and producer Darren Aronofsky (2014, in conversation with novelist and critic Lynne Tillman); writer, director, and producer Matthew Weiner (2013, in conversation with writer A.M. Homes); artist and architect Maya Lin (2012); chef, author, and activist Alice Waters (2011); founder of Wikipedia Jimmy Wales (2010); and choreographer Bill T. Jones (2009), whose talk inaugurated this program.

In 2021, the New Museum launched the biennial Hostetler/Wrigley Sculpture Award to commission five women artists to create sculptures. Each winning project is allotted $400,000 for its production and installation.

=== IdeasCity ===
IdeasCity was a nine-year New Museum platform to explore art and culture beyond the walls of the museum. Founded in 2011 by Lisa Phillips and Karen Wong, IdeasCity was a collaborative initiative between hundreds of arts, design, education, and community organizations that consists of two distinct components: the biennial IdeasCity Festival in New York City, and IdeasCity Global Programs in key urban centers around the world, including Athens, Detroit, Istanbul, New Orleans, São Paulo, Shanghai, and Toronto. IdeasCity curators included Richard Flood, Joseph Grima, V. Mitch McEwen, and Vere Van Gool. The IdeasCity program concluded in 2020.

== Management ==
=== Funding ===
In 2002, the New Museum sold its previous home in SoHo for $18 million. It subsequently bought the new Bowery site for $5 million. In order to cover the building and endowment, it raised an estimated $64 million.

=== Director ===
From its founding in 1977 to 1999 Marcia Tucker was Director of the museum. In 1999, Marcia Tucker was succeeded as director by Lisa Phillips, previously the curator of contemporary art at the Whitney Museum of American Art. On September 25, 2025, the Museum announced that Phillips would retire in April 2026. Following her retirement she will become Director Emeritus and will curate an exhibition on the cultural history of the Bowery. In July 2026, Massimiliano Gioni, its longtime artistic director, has been named as the institution’s next director. He will take on the role beginning August 1, 2026. He succeeds Lisa Phillips, who announced her retirement, after 26 years, last September.

=== Board of trustees ===
Since taking office, director Lisa Phillips expanded board membership to 42 from 18. As of 2015, it includes collectors Maja Hoffmann, Dakis Joannou, and Eugenio López Alonso, among others.

== See also ==
- List of museums and cultural institutions in New York City
