= Lisa Park =

Lisa Park may refer to:

- Lisa Park (Stargate), a character on Stargate Universe
- Lisa Park (artist), interdisciplinary artist
