= Office for Metropolitan Architecture =

Dutch architectural firm

OMA
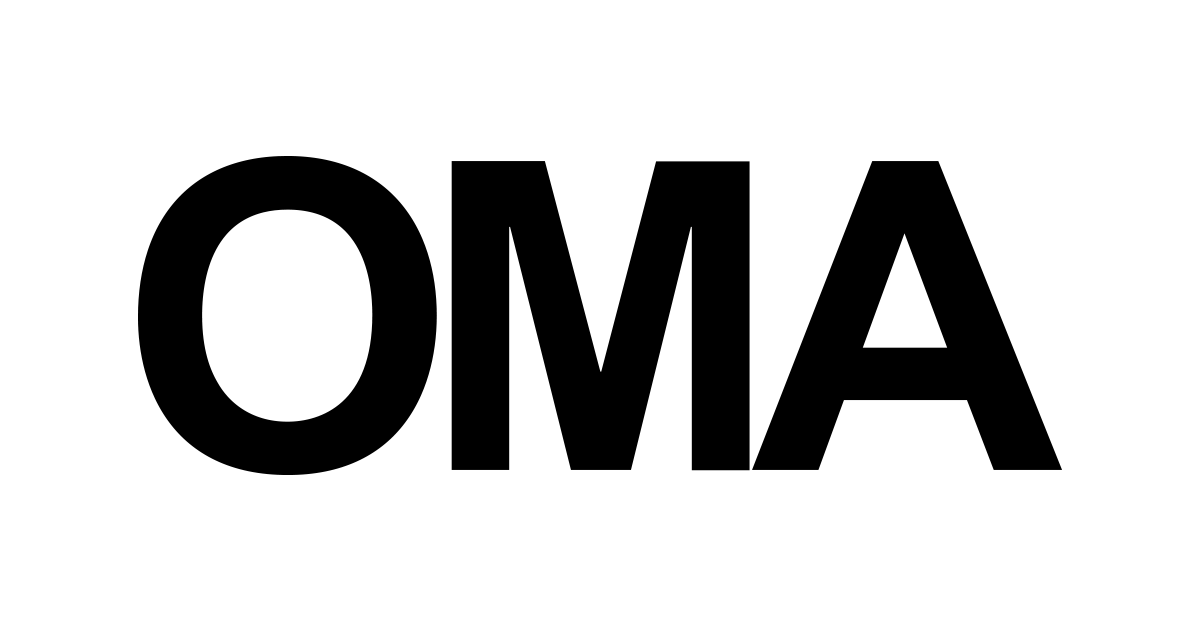

Practice information
- Partners: Rem Koolhaas; Reinier de Graaf; Ellen van Loon; Shohei Shigematsu; Iyad Alsaka; David Gianotten; Chris van Duijn; Jason Long
- Founded: 1975
- Location: Rotterdam
- Coordinates: 51.928500°N 4.480494°E

Significant works and honors
- Buildings: Fondazione Prada; De Rotterdam; CCTV Headquarters; Casa da Música; Seattle Central Library
- Design: The Image of Europe

Website
- www.oma.com

The Office for Metropolitan Architecture (OMA) is an international architectural firm with offices in Rotterdam, New York, Hong Kong, Doha, and Australia. The firm is currently led by eight partners - Rem Koolhaas, Reinier de Graaf, Ellen van Loon, Shohei Shigematsu, Iyad Alsaka, Chris van Duijn, Jason Long, and managing partner and architect David Gianotten.

== History ==
Rem Koolhaas and Elia Zenghelis started working together in the early 1970s at the Architectural Association, the London-based architecture school, where Koolhaas was a student and Zenghelis an instructor. Their first major project was the utopian/dystopian project Exodus, or the Voluntary Prisoners of Architecture (1972). This project proposed a linear structure, cutting through London like a knife. Other projects included City of the Captive Globe (1974), Hotel Sphinx (1975), New Welfare Island/Welfare Palace Hotel (1975–76), Roosevelt Island Redevelopment (1975) – all "paper" projects that were not (intended to be) built, and all located in Manhattan, the subject of Koolhaas's book Delirious New York, A Retroactive Manifesto for Manhattan (1975).

OMA was founded in 1975 by Dutch architect Rem Koolhaas and Greek architect Elia Zenghelis, along with Madelon Vriesendorp and Zoe Zenghelis. The founding of OMA coincided with the firm's entry in the architectural design competition for a new Dutch parliament building in The Hague in 1978, with Zaha Hadid. OMA was one of the first-prize winners (among some 10 others), and the project was widely discussed and published. The commission, however, was given to an architect who did not participate in the competition. The entry for the Dutch parliament competition was the first of a series of controversial and successful international competition entries by OMA in the 1980s that were not built by OMA.

=== OMA in the 1980s ===
OMA's first major commissions were The Netherlands Dance Theatre (1981) in The Hague and IJ-Plein Urban planning (1981–1988) in Amsterdam. Due to change of location a second design for the Dance Theater was made in 1984. Once completed in 1987, the building received international attention. Although full of "first mistakes", the Dance Theater is the first realized design in which the ideas of Rem Koolhaas were made apparent. IJ-plein is located at Amsterdam's IJ, a river that serves as the city's waterfront, opposite the city center. The master plan consists of 1,300 dwellings and several facilities. OMA designed the school, the community center, and two blocks of housing.

A few other designs were realized in the 1980s: a police station in Almere (1982–1985), a bus station in Rotterdam (1985–1987, demolished in 2005), Byzantium apartment block in Amsterdam (1985–1991) and Checkpoint Charlie Housing in Berlin (1984–1990). Two houses were built in this period; the first house was a duo of patio villas (1985–1988) in the style of Mies van der Rohe, inserted in a dike in Rotterdam. The second – arguably the most full-grown design of OMA until that date – was Villa Dall'Ava in Paris (1984–1991). The client, according to Koolhaas, asked for a "masterpiece". He wanted a glass house. She wanted a swimming pool on the roof. So many delays plagued the house that it "became a record of our own (OMA's) growing up".

Several studies were made during the late 1970s and 1980s: Study for the renovation of a panopticon prison in Arnhem in 1979, Boompjes tower slab in Rotterdam (1979), Housing for Berlin IBA (1980, not realised, and the reason OMA would not design anything in Berlin anymore in the 20th century, the Dutch Embassy Building being the comeback), master plan for a world exhibition in Paris (1983). Much more important however were the competition entries OMA designed in this period. They gained the office international fame (but not one design was actually built).

=== OMA in the 1990s ===
In the 1990s OMA gained renown through a series of groundbreaking entries in major competitions: e.g., Tres Grande Bibliothèque and Two Libraries for Jussieu University, Paris, France (1993). During these years OMA also realized ambitious projects, ranging from private residences to large scale urban plans: Villa dall’Ava, Paris, France (1991), Nexus Housing, Fukuoka, Japan (1991), Kunsthal, Rotterdam (1992).

The Euralille (1994), a 70-hectare business and civic center in Lille, northern France comprising the European hub for high-speed trains, transformed a once dormant center of more than 50 million inhabitants into a site offering connectivity, and a range of contemporary activities.

In 1999 OMA completed the Maison à Bordeaux, a villa for a client in the hills outside Bordeaux, France. The villa's most striking feature is a platform in the very center of the house that moves freely between the three floors and allowed the client to move with his wheelchair on all three levels of the villa. The design was conceived in collaboration with engineer Cecil Balmond.

=== OMA in the 21st century ===
OMA's recently completed projects include Axel Springer Campus in Berlin (2020), MEETT Exhibition and Convention Centre in Toulouse (2020), Galleria in Gwanggyo (2020), Brighton College (2020), Norra Tornen in Stockholm (2020), Potato Head Studios in Bali (2020), nhow Amsterdam RAI Hotel (2020), WA Museum Boola Bardip in Perth (2019), BLOX ? DAC in Copenhagen (2018), Fondation Galeries Lafayette in Paris (2018), Fondazione Prada in Milan (2018) and Qatar National Library (2017).

OMA was awarded the contract for the Seattle Central Library, completed in 2005, despite not having been on the list of firms originally invited to submit designs. Former partner and Seattle resident Joshua Prince-Ramus, heard from his mother about the meeting for interested firms at the last minute and flew in from the Netherlands. This 11-story glass and steel building is a striking addition to the Seattle cityscape.

In Asia, OMA completed the massive Central China Television Headquarters building in Beijing, and the new building for the Shenzhen Stock Exchange. In January 2009 OMA won the competition to build the Taipei Performing Arts Center in Taiwan, completed and opened in 2022.

In October 2011, the Barbican Art Gallery launched their exhibition "OMA/Progress", the first major presentation of OMA's work in the UK, curated by Belgium-based creative collective Rotor.

== AMO ==
In 1998, Rem Koolhaas and Reinier de Graaf founded AMO, a think tank within OMA dedicated to producing non-architectural work including exhibitions, branding campaigns, publishing, and energy planning. AMO has produced exhibitions at the Venice Biennale (on the Hermitage museum in St. Petersburg) and Venice Architecture Biennale (on the development of the Gulf, and, in 2010, on preservation), and guest-edited issues of the magazines Wired and Domus. AMO has produced work for Universal Studios, Amsterdam Airport Schiphol, Harvard University, Condé Nast, Heineken, and IKEA.

AMO projects also include the development of in-store technology for Prada, a strategy for the future of Volkswagen, a strategy for TMRW, work for Platform 21, new design institute in Amsterdam, a curatorial master plan for the Hermitage Museum in St. Petersburg, and Roadmap 2050: A Practical Guide to a Prosperous, Low-Carbon Europe. In 2008 AMO curated the exhibition "Dubai Next" at the Vitra Design Museum in Weil am Rhein, and was one of the editors on the book Al Manakh, which details the rapid transformation of the Gulf region. In 2010 in collaboration with Archis and Think Tank, AMO made the follow-up, Al Manakh 2.

== Notable works ==
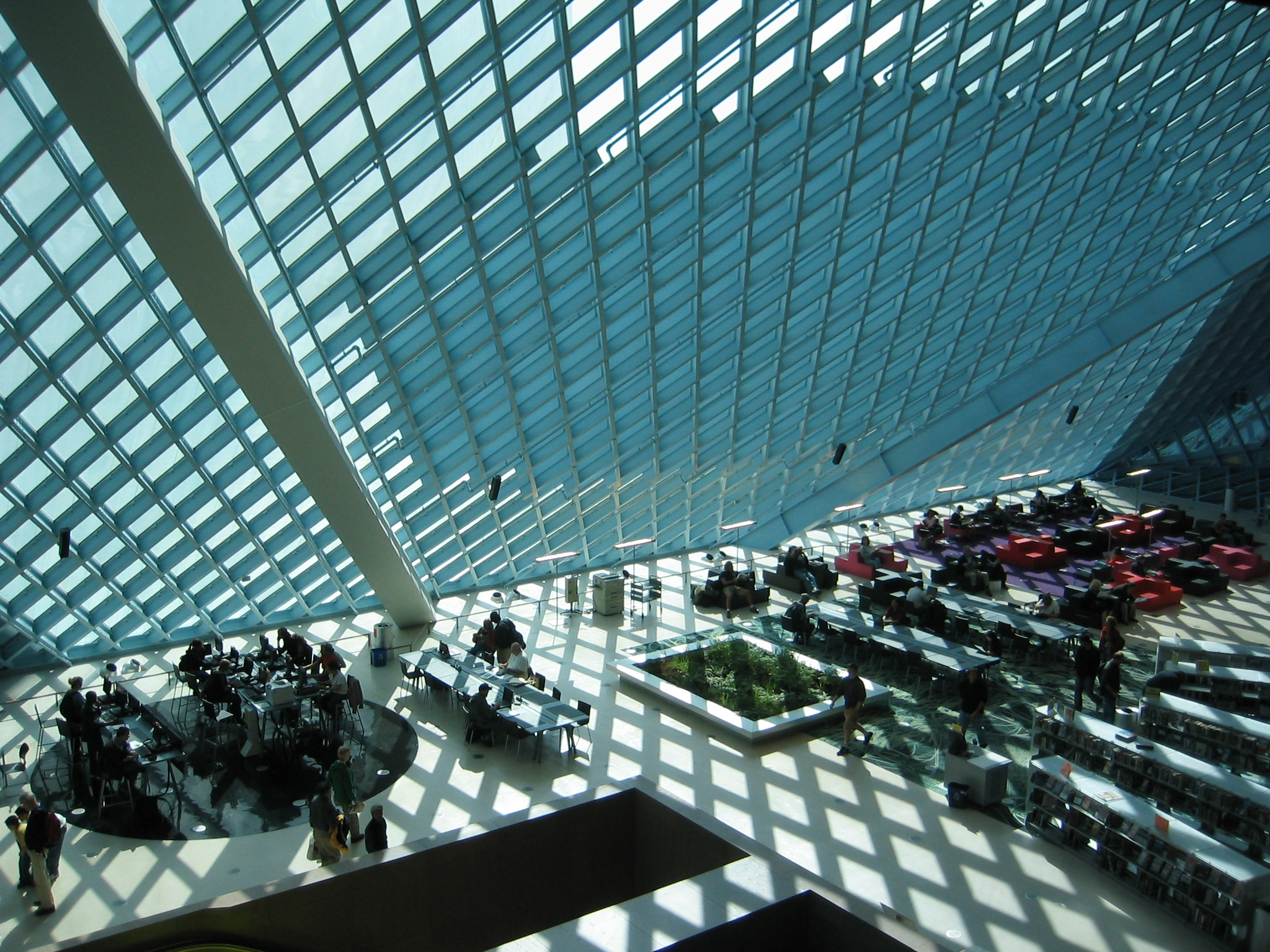
Seattle Central Library

=== Seattle Central Library ===
In 1999 OMA won a competition to design a new central library for the city of Seattle. The Seattle Central Library was completed and opened to the public on May 23, 2004. In 2005, the library earned a national American Institute of Architects Honor Award for Architecture. The building has also been described as "the most important new library to be built in a generation, and the most exhilarating" by New Yorker architecture critic Paul Goldberger.

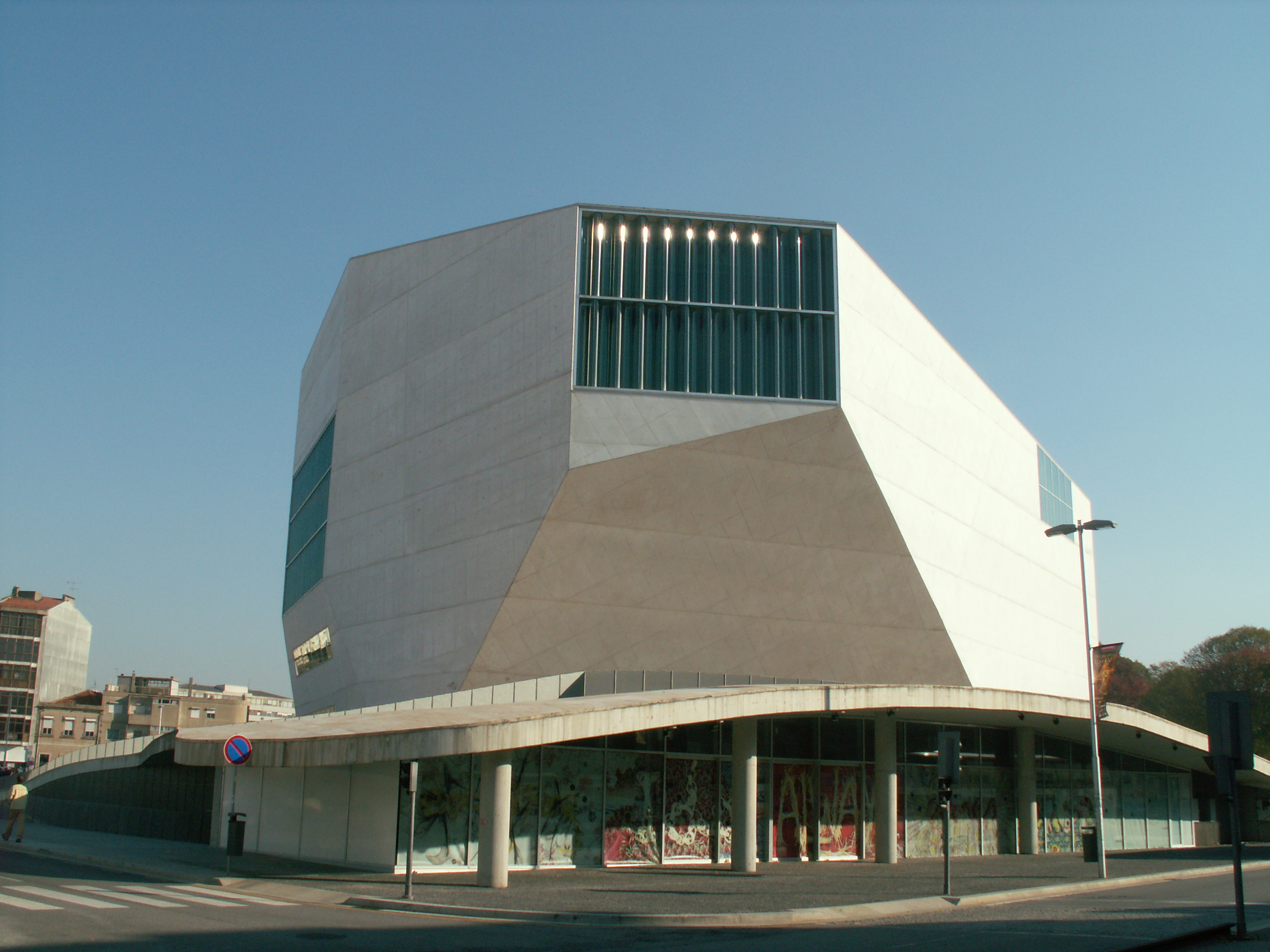
Casa da Música, Porto

=== Casa da Música, Porto ===
Completed in 2005, the new home of the National Orchestra of Porto, the Casa da Música, stands on a new public square in the historic Rotunda da Boavista. With a distinct faceted form, New York Times critic Nicolai Ouroussoff called it "a building whose intellectual ardor is matched by its sensual beauty". Inside, the elevated 1,300-seat Grand Auditorium, in the shape of a shoebox, has corrugated glass façades at either end that open the hall to the city and offer Porto itself as a dramatic backdrop for performances. As well as the Grand Auditorium, conceived as a simple mass hollowed out end-to-end from the solid form of the building, the Casa da Música also contains a smaller, more flexible performance space with no fixed seating.

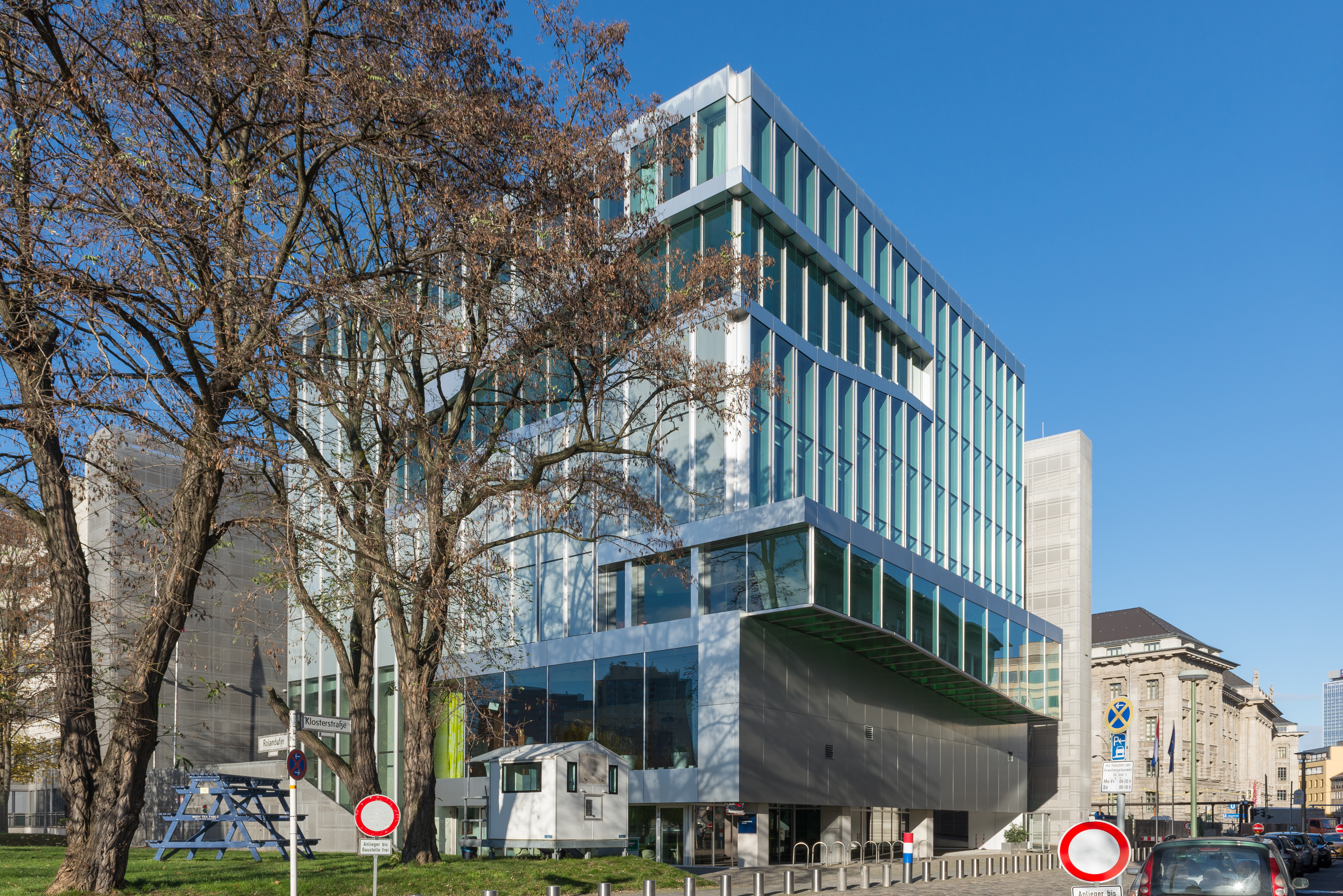
Embassy of the Netherlands, Berlin

The Image of Europe, AMO's proposal for the European flag

=== Netherlands Embassy, Berlin ===
Winner of the 2005 Mies van der Rohe Award (the European Union Prize for Contemporary Architecture), OMA's Netherlands Embassy in Berlin is an isolated cube surrounded on two sides by a perimeter wall. The cube is punctured by a cantilevered meeting room and the visibility of the zig-zagging, interior path through the building.

=== European flag proposal ===
Following the signing of Treaties of Nice in May 2001, the then-President of the European Commission, Romano Prodi, and Belgian Prime Minister Guy Verhofstadt, Koolhaas suggested a European flag, called the "Barcode". The Barcode unites the flags of the EU countries into a single, colorful symbol.

In the current European flag, there is a fixed number of stars. In the Barcode, however, new Member States of the EU can be added without space constraints. Originally, the Barcode displayed 15 EU countries, and in 2004 the symbol was adapted to include ten new Member States. Croatia was added in 2013. The Barcode was officially used for the first time during the 2006 Austrian Presidency of the Council of the European Union.

== Current projects ==
As of 2021, OMA's current projects included:

=== Europe ===
- Mangalem 21, Tirana, Albania
- KaDeWe Berlin, Germany
- Simone Veil Bridge, Bordeaux, France
- The Factory, Manchester, UK
- Palais de Justice de Lille, France
- KaDeWe Vienna, Austria
- Feyenoord Stadium, Rotterdam, The Netherlands
- Feyenoord City, Rotterdam, The Netherlands
- NMBS SNCB Headquarters, Brussels, Belgium
- New Tretyakov, Moscow, Russia
- Bajes Kwartier, Amsterdam, the Netherlands

=== North America ===
- Audrey Irmas Pavilion (2022), Wilshire Boulevard Temple, Los Angeles
- Greenpoint Landing, New York City
- Park Grove, Miami
- The Terminal, Houston
- 11th Street Park, Jersey City
- 88 Seaport, Boston
- Denver Art Museum Design Galleries and Studio, Denver
- New Museum, New York City
- FAB Civic Center Park, Los Angeles
- UIC Center for the Arts, Chicago
- Post Houston
- Centre Pompidou x Jersey City, Jersey City
- Buffalo Albright-Knox-Gundlach Art Museum
- Tiffany & Co. Landmark Renovation, New York City

=== Asia and Oceania ===
==== Asia Pacific ====
- Taipei Performing Arts Center, Taipei, Taiwan
- Dhaka Tower, Tejgaon Industrial Area, Dhaka, Bangladesh
- Hangzhou Prism, Hangzhou, China
- 67 Race Course Road, Mumbai, India
- CMG Qianhai Global Trade Center, Shenzhen, China
- Qianhai International Financial Exchange Center, China
- Chengdu Future Science and Technology City Launch Area Masterplan and Architecture Design, Chengdu, China
- Wollert Neighbourhood Centre, Whittlesea, Australia

==== Middle East ====
- Al Daayan Health District Masterplan, Doha, Qatar
- HIA Airport City, Doha, Qatar
- Wafra Tower, Kuwait City, Kuwait

== Gallery ==
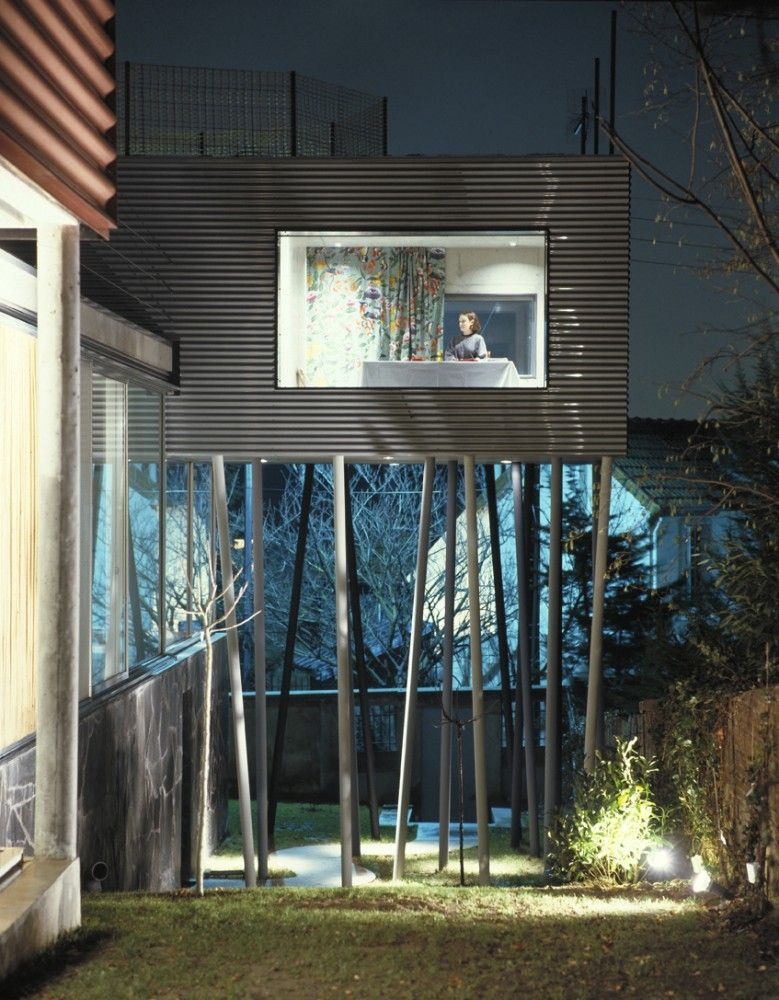
Villa dall'Ava, Paris, France, OMA

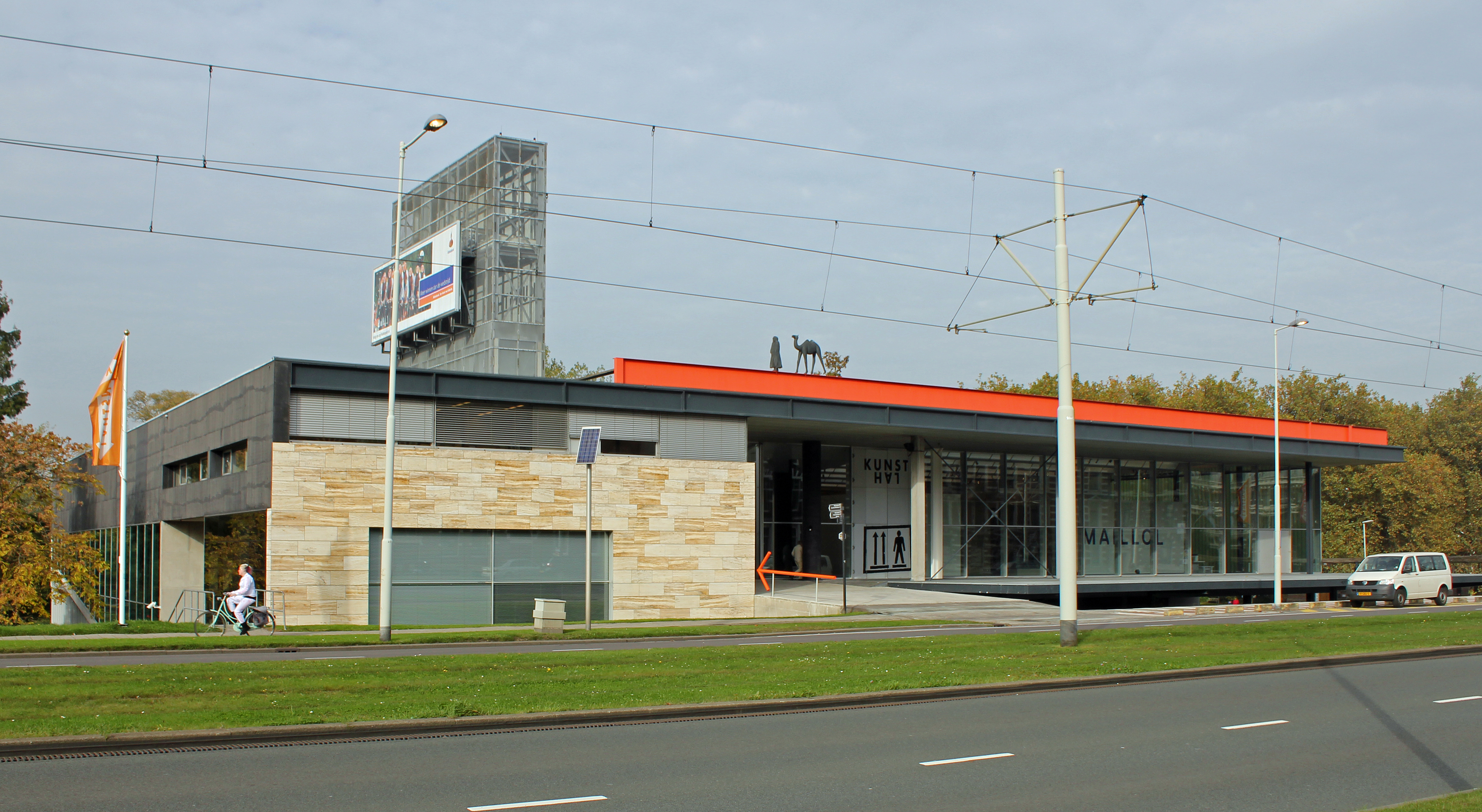
Kunsthal, Rotterdam, The Netherlands, OMA

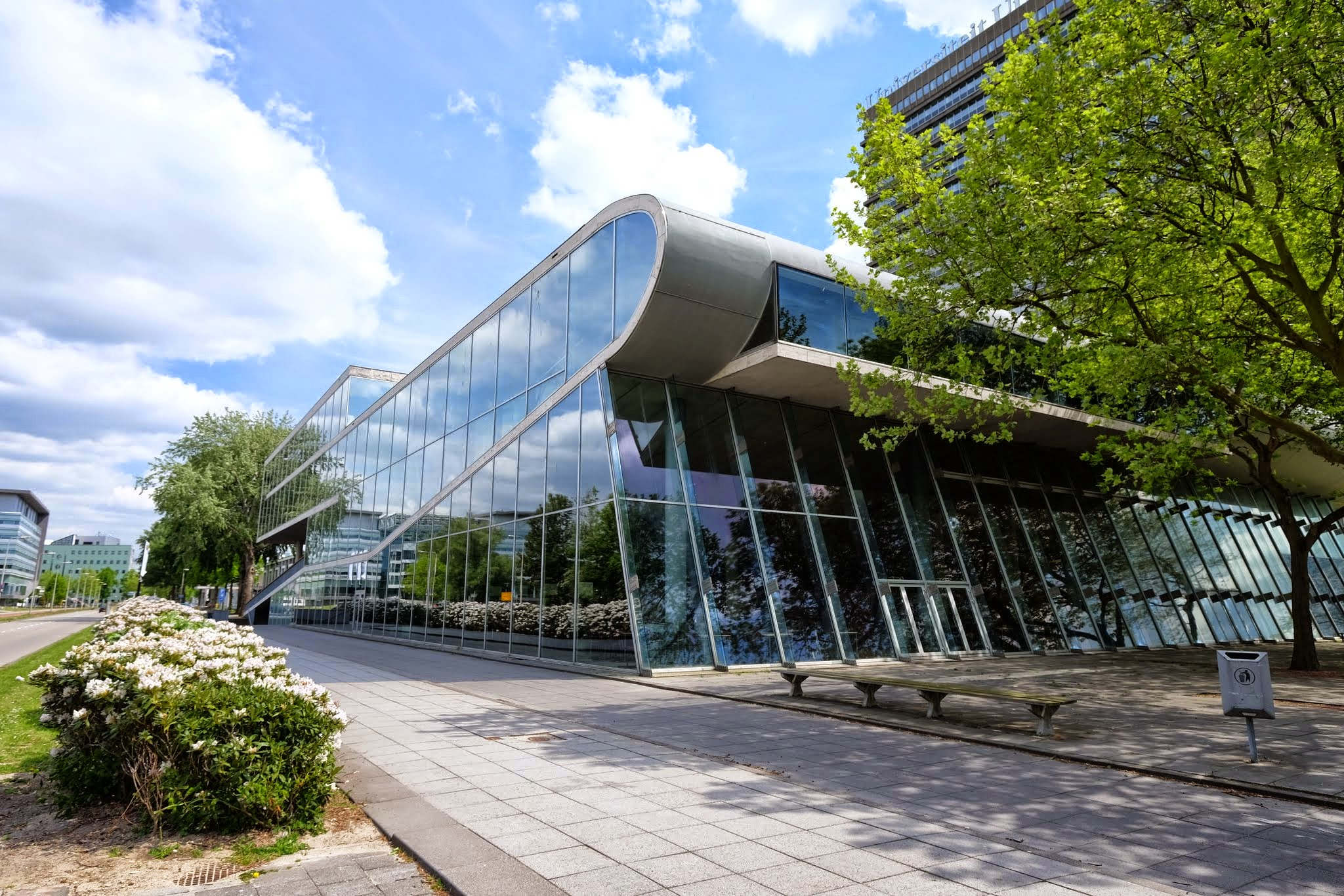
Educatorium, Utrecht, The Netherlands, OMA

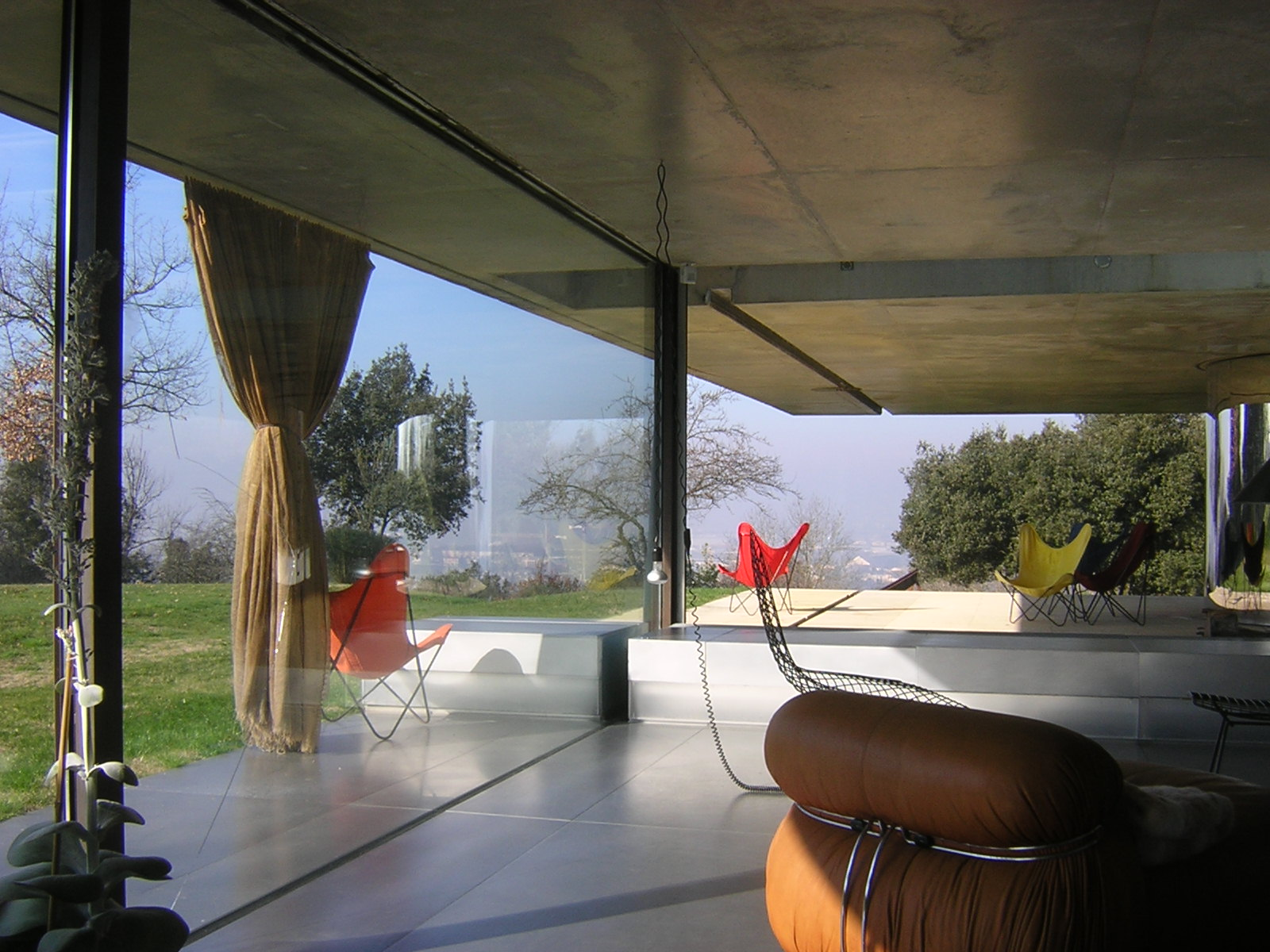
Maison à Bordeaux, France, OMA

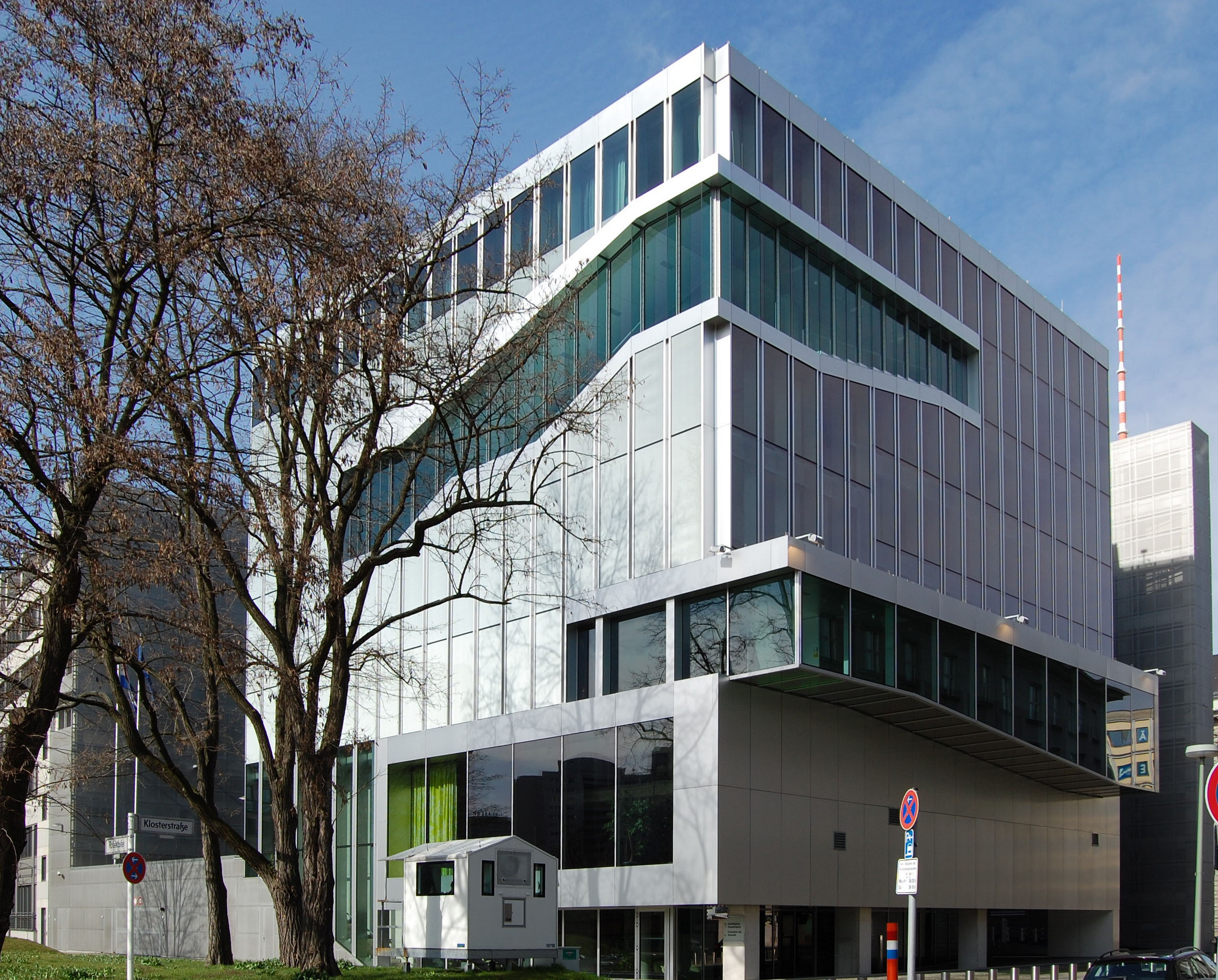
Embassy of the Netherlands, Berlin, Germany, OMA

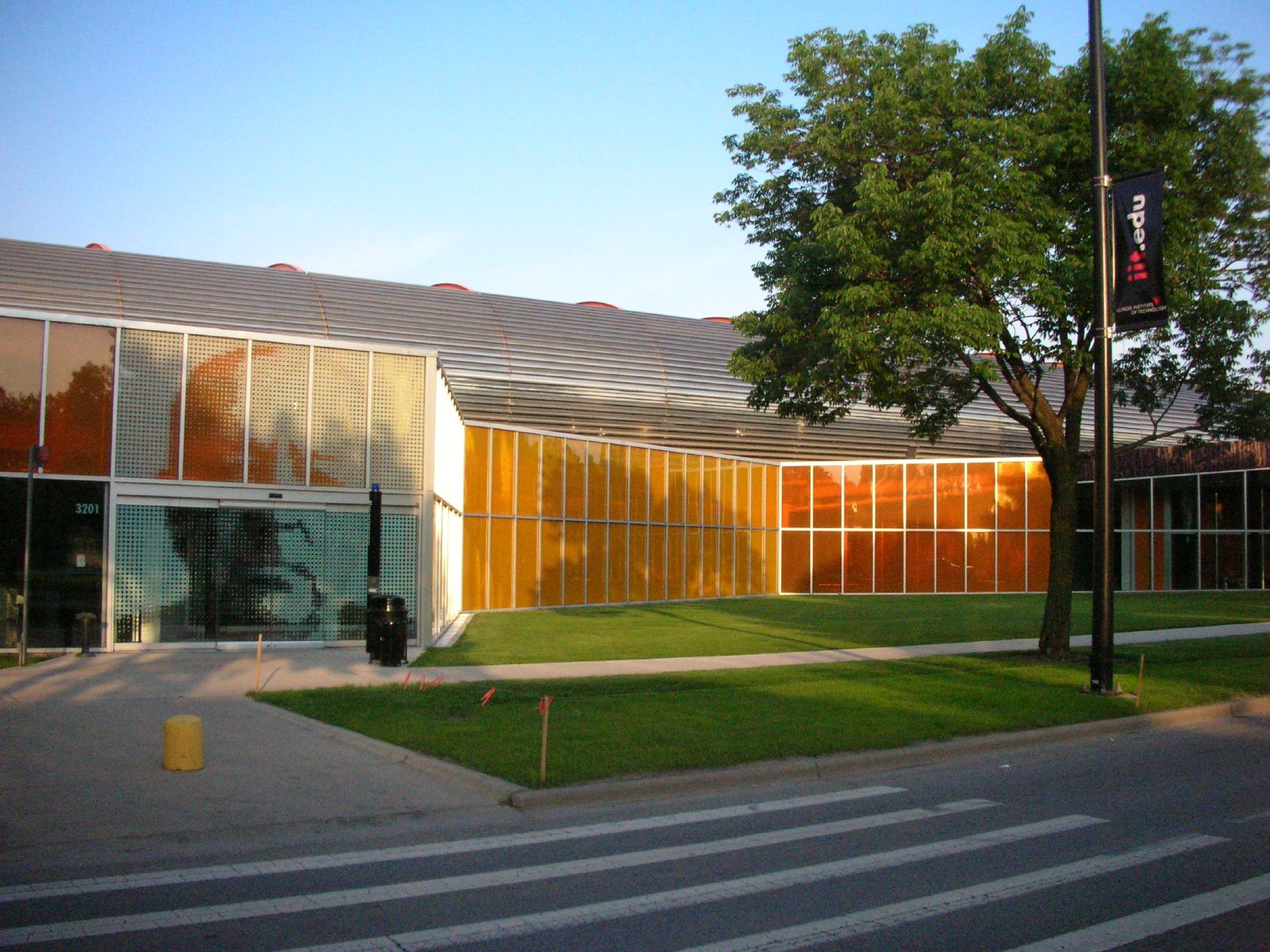
McCormick Tribune Campus Center, Chicago, United States, OMA

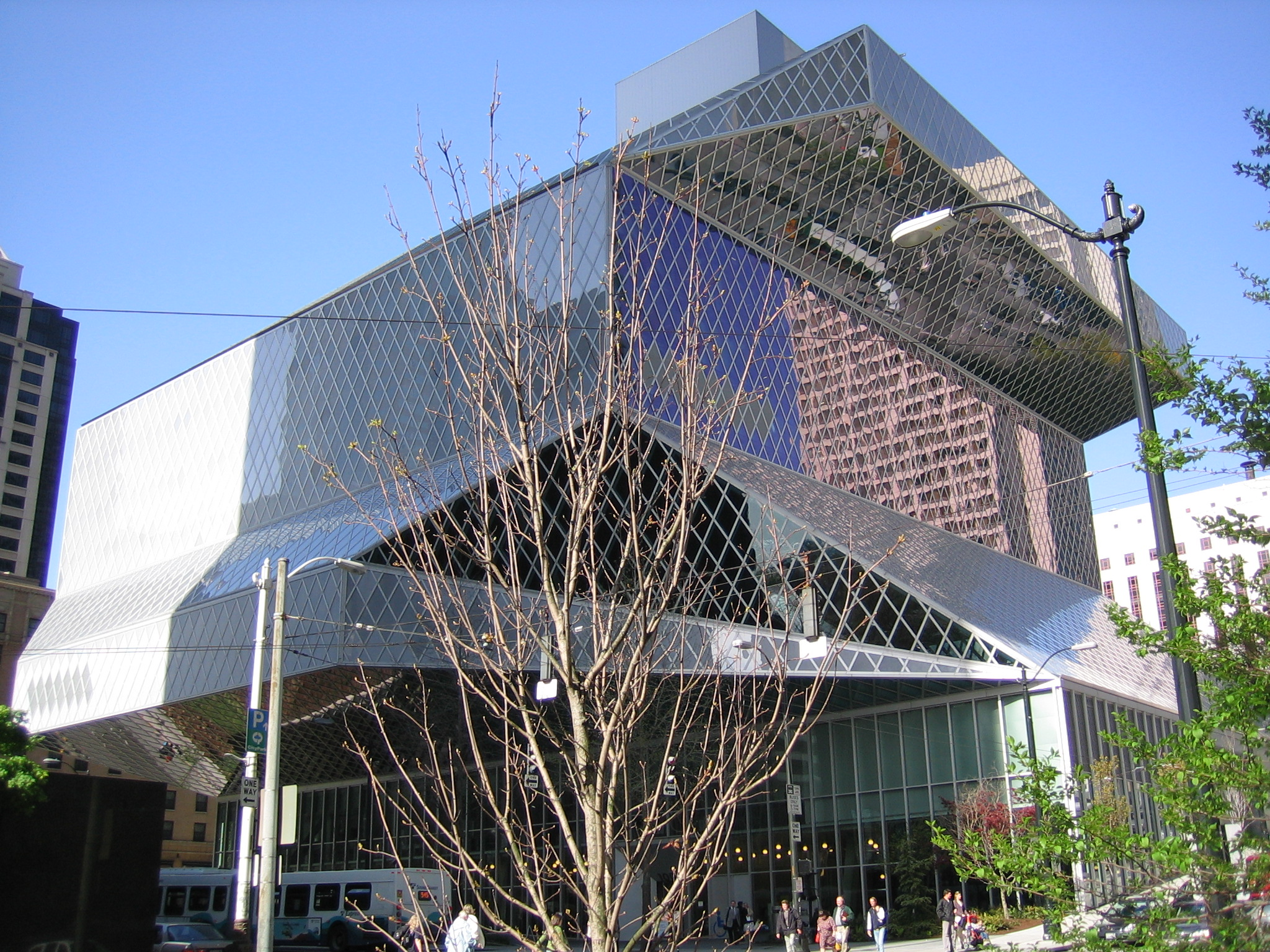
Seattle Central Library, Seattle, United States, OMA

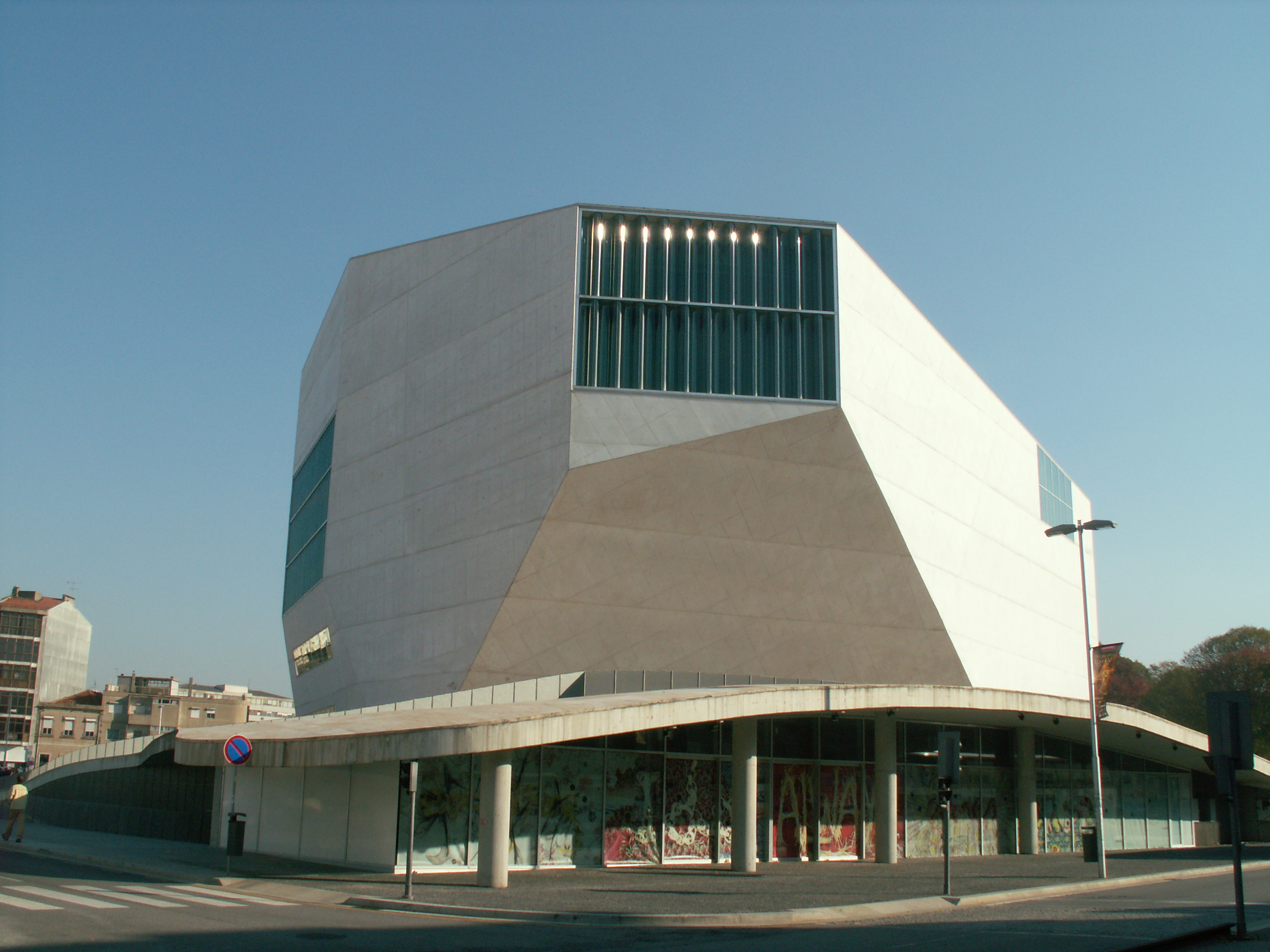
Casa da Música, Porto, Portugal, OMA

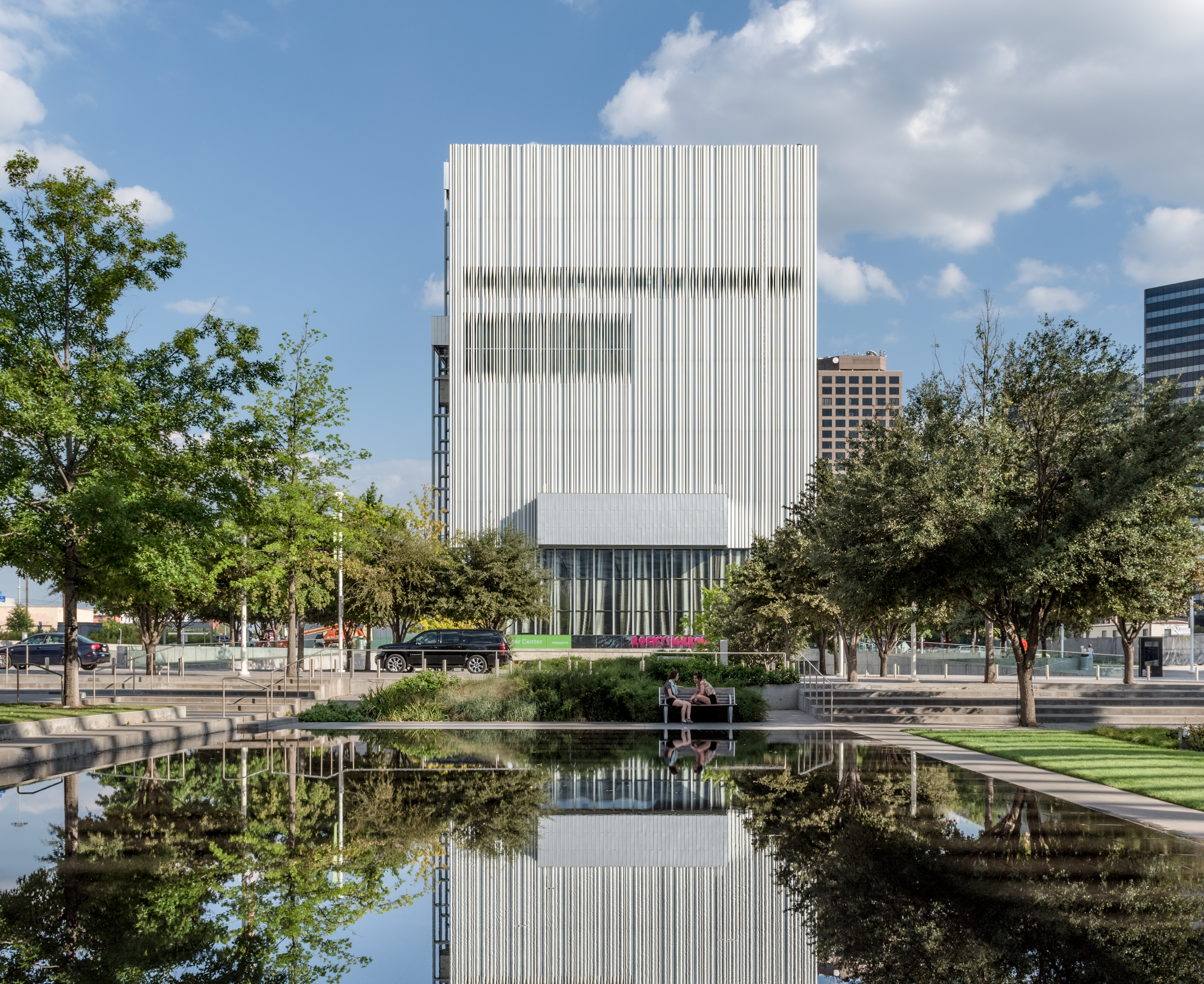
Dee and Charles Wyly Theater, Dallas, US, OMA

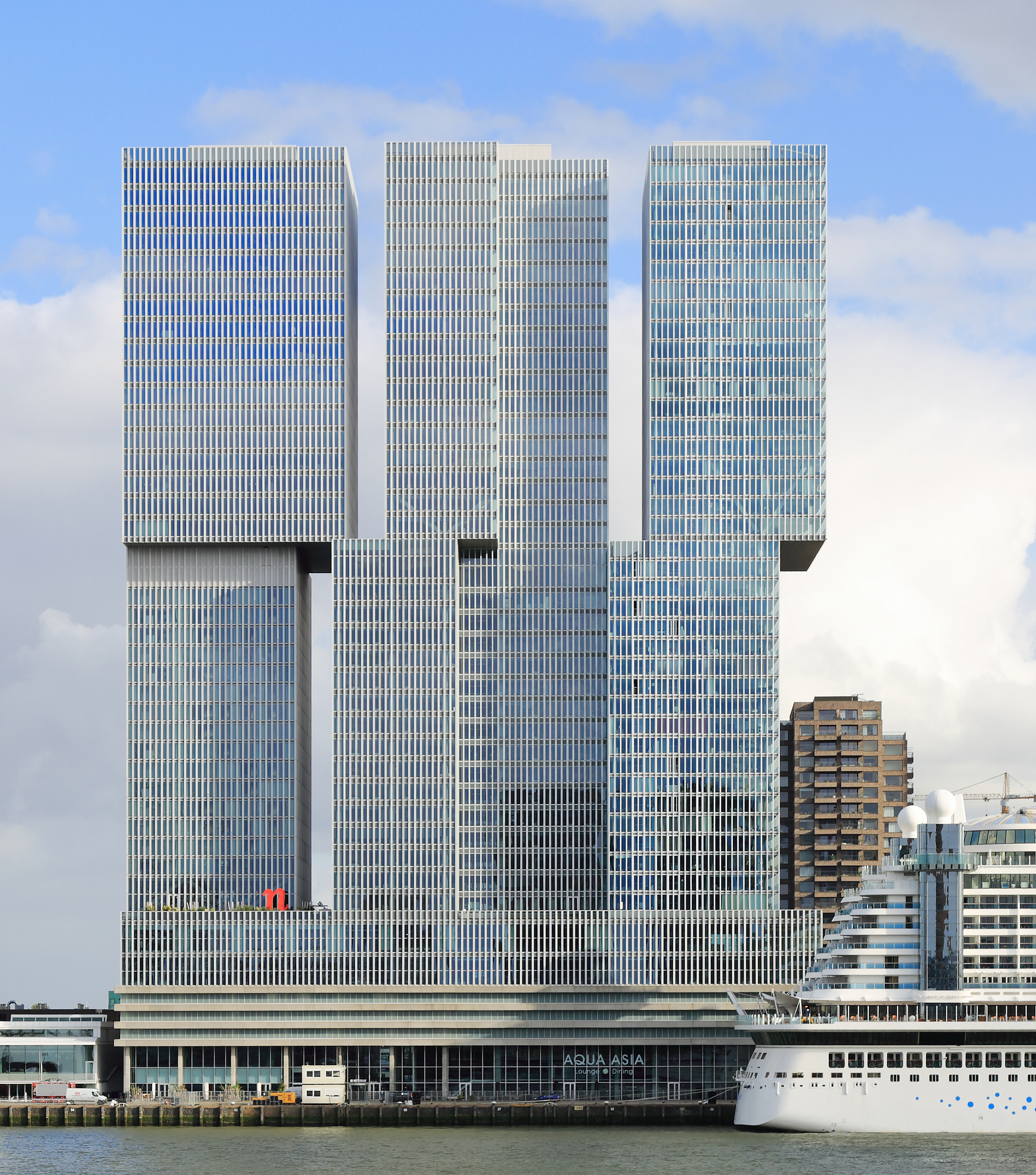
De Rotterdam, Rotterdam, The Netherlands, OMA

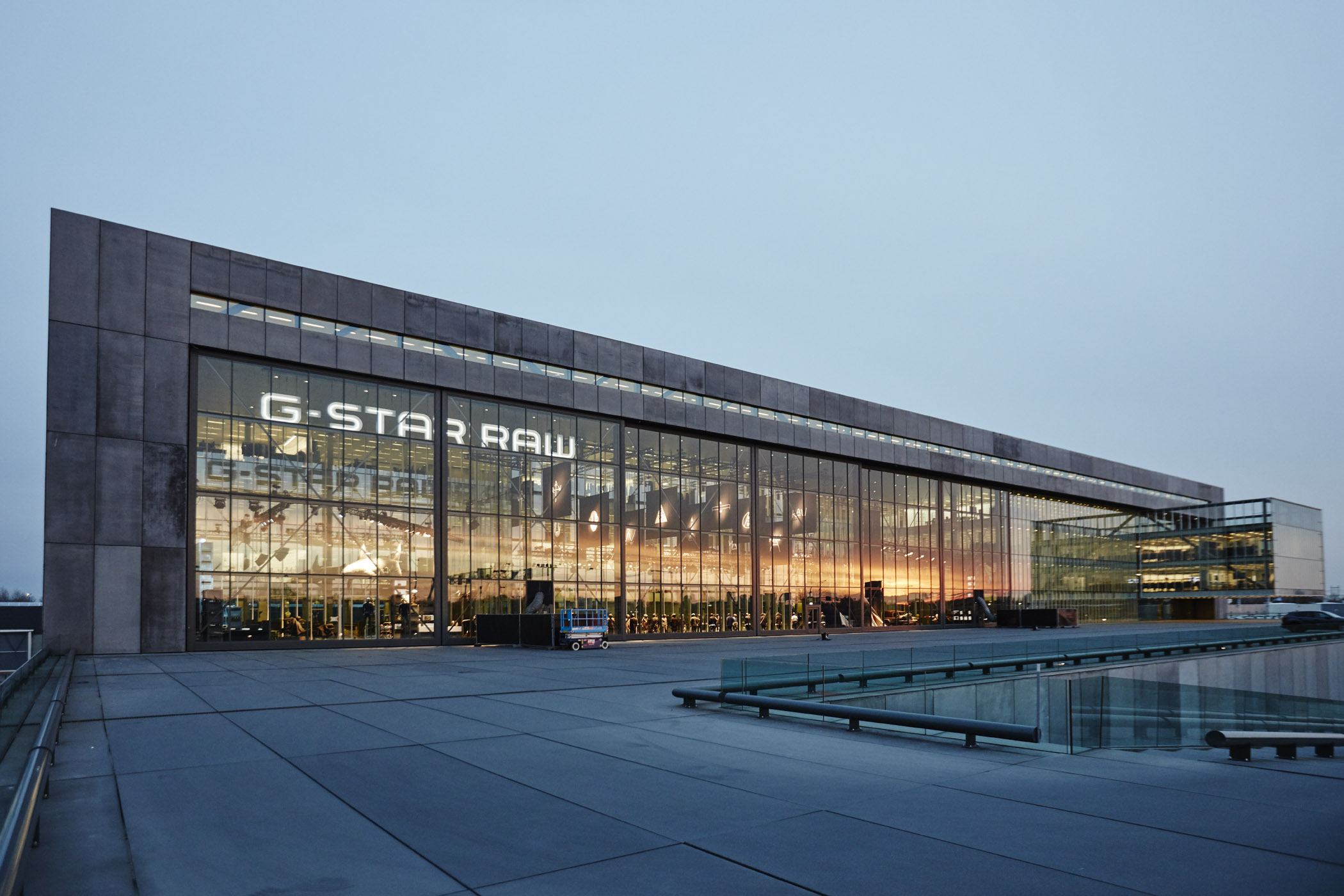
G-Star Raw Headquarters, Amsterdam, The Netherlands, OMA

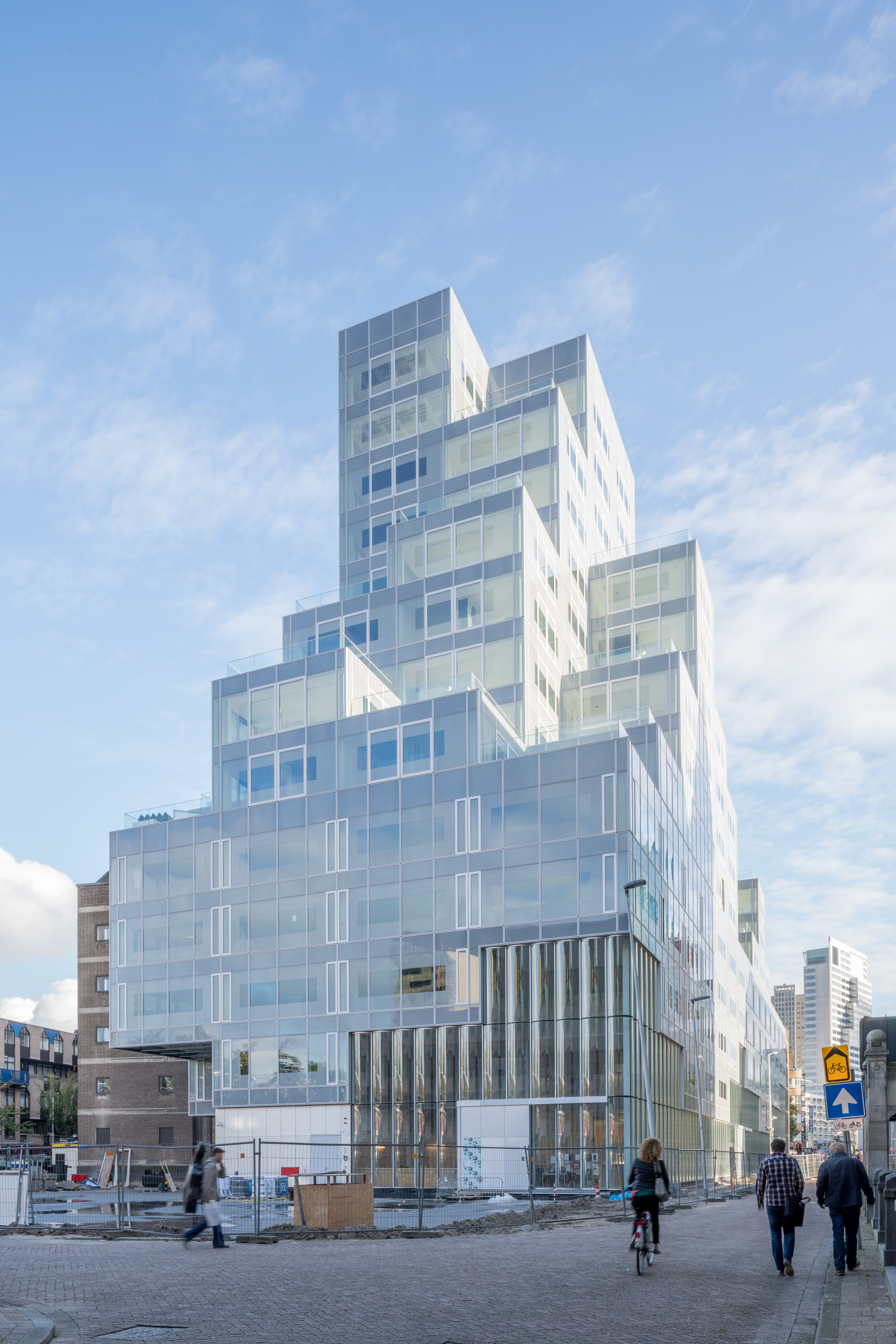
Timmerhuis, Rotterdam, The Netherlands, OMA

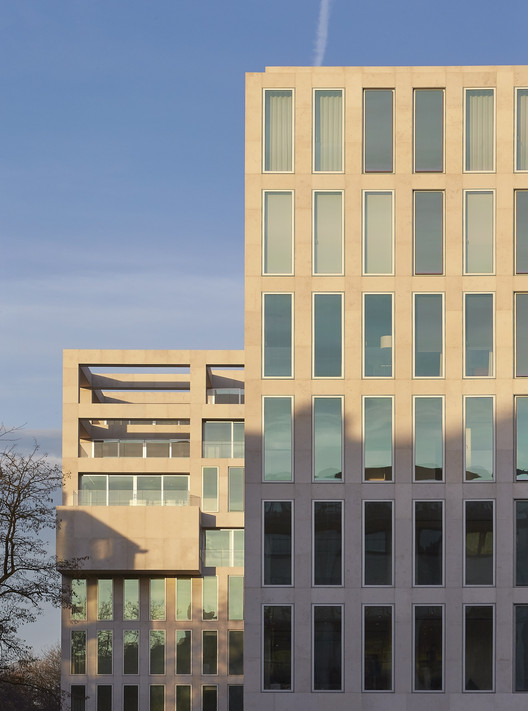
Holland Green, London, UK, OMA

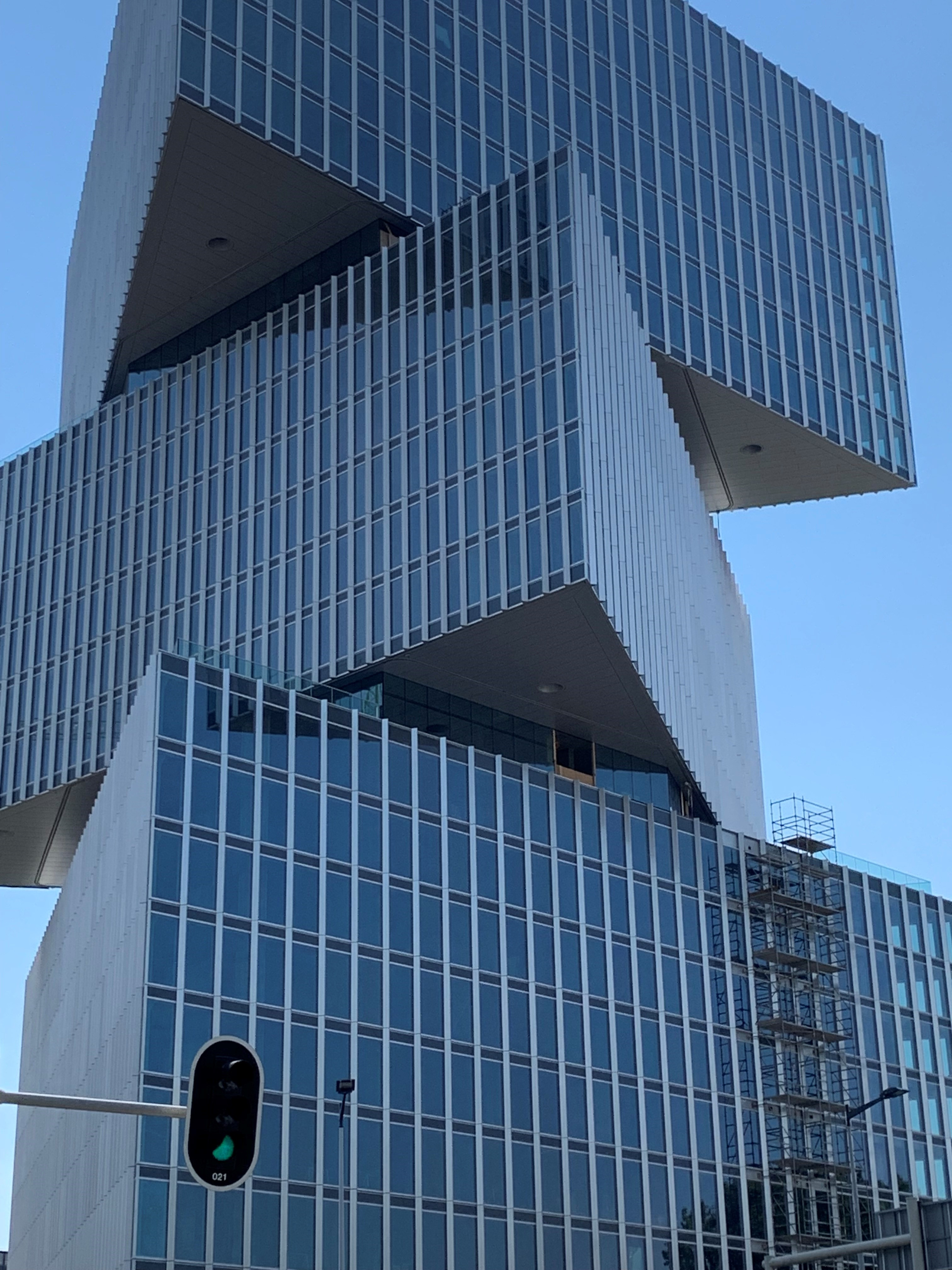
nhow Amsterdam RAI Hotel, Amsterdam, The Netherlands, OMA

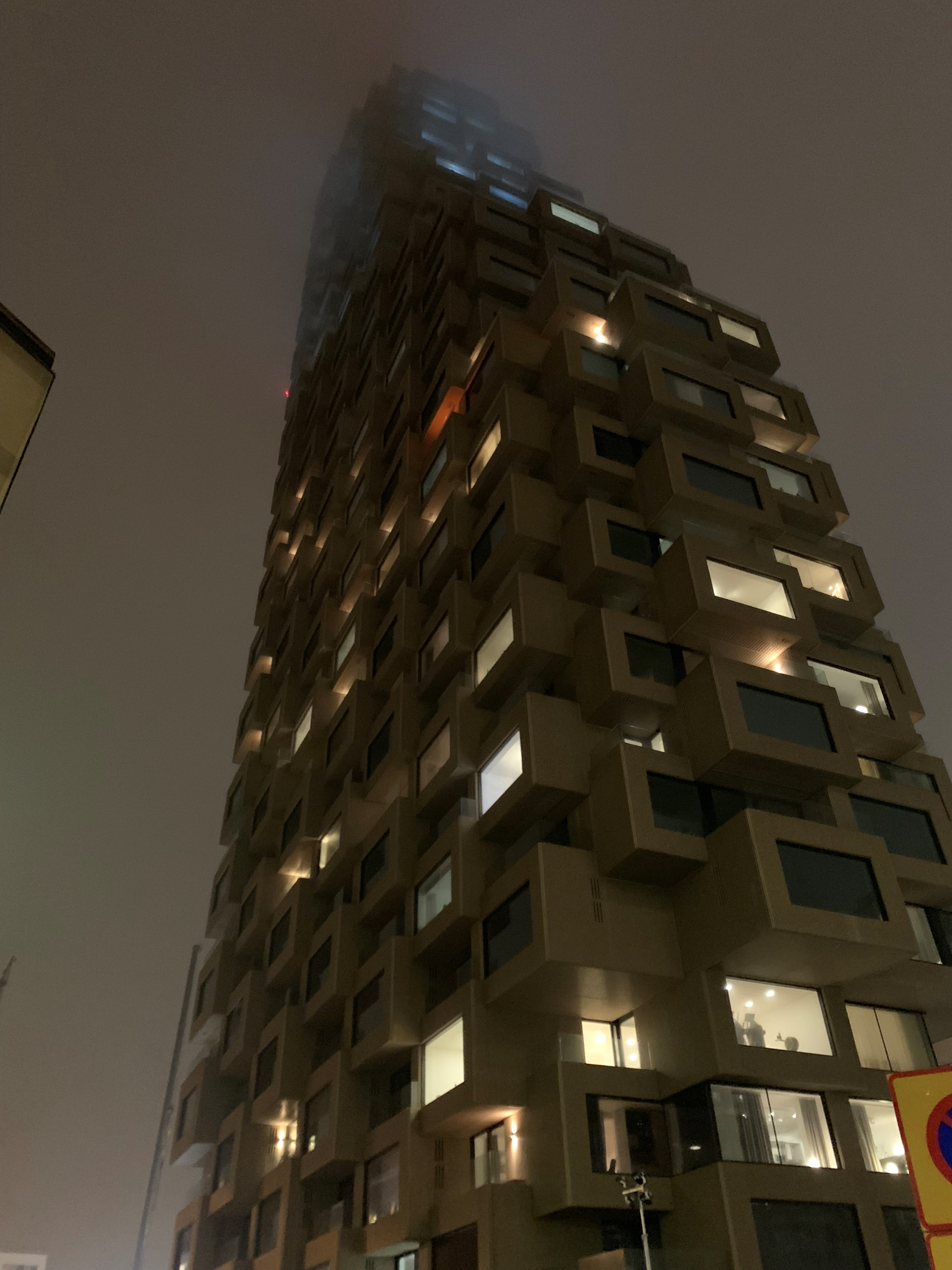
Norra Tornen, Stockholm, Sweden, OMA

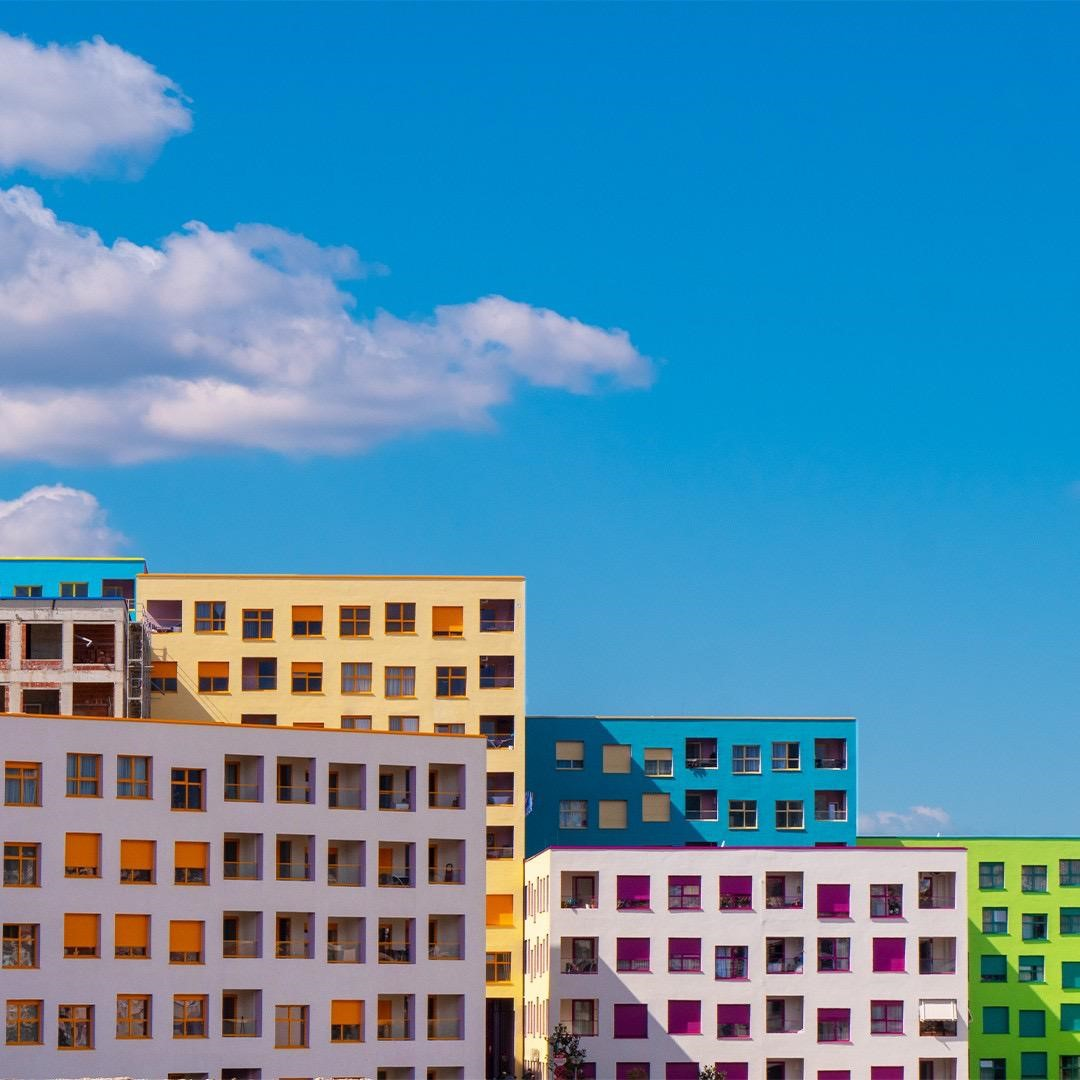
Mangalem 21, Tirana, Albania, OMA
