= Taipei Performing Arts Center =

Art center in Shilin, Taipei, Taiwan

- 臺北表演藝術中心

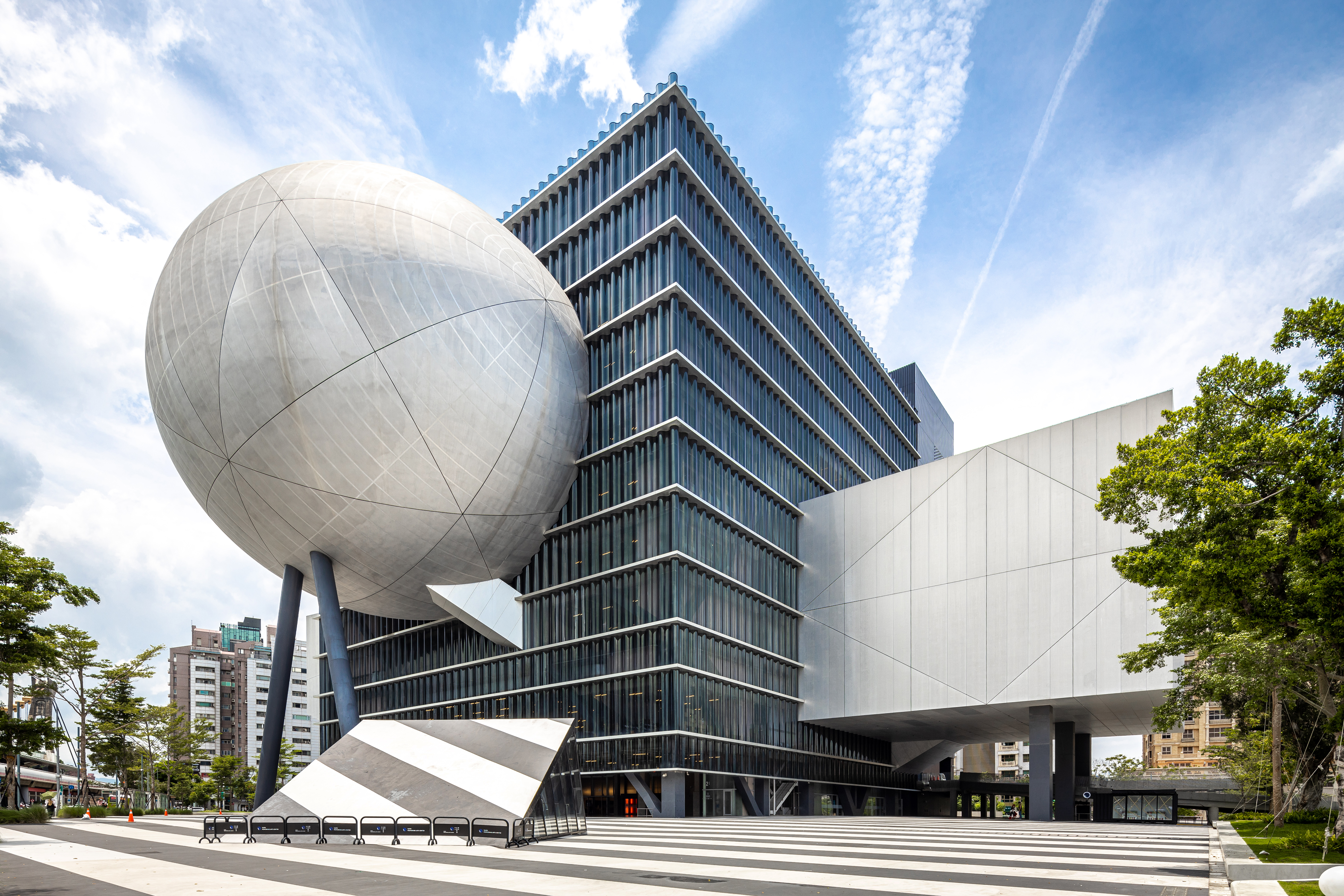
- Taipei Performing Arts Center in 2023
- Interactive map of Taipei Performing Arts Center
- Former names: Taipei Arts Center (2004–2014)
- Address: No. 1, Jiantan Rd., Shilin Dist; Taipei, Taiwan
- Coordinates: 25°5′6″N 121°31′27″E
- Owner: Department of Cultural Affairs, Taipei City Government
- Capacity: 3100
- Type: art center
- Event: theatre

Construction
- Groundbreaking: 28 February 2012
- Opened: July 2, 2022; 4 years ago
- Cost: NT$6.75 billion
- Architect: Office for Metropolitan Architecture
- Structural engineer: Evergreen Consulting Engineering

Website
- Official website

The Taipei Performing Arts Center (TPAC; traditional Chinese: 臺北表演藝術中心; simplified Chinese: 台北表演艺术中心; pinyin: Táiběi Biǎoyǎn Yìshù Zhōngxīn) is a performance center in Shilin District, Taipei, Taiwan.

== History ==
The construction of the center began in 2012. The center construction topped out on 27 August 2014. On 31 August 2016, the center facade was revealed. The structure was constructed with a cost of NT$5.4 billion. The center had a trial opening in March–May 2022 before it officially opened on 2 July 2022.

== Architecture ==
The center was designed by David Gianotten and Rem Koolhaas at Office for Metropolitan Architecture. It has geometrical shapes with a total space area of 50,000 m^{2}. At the center, there is a cube-shaped structure. It also consists the sphere-shaped playhouse which has a capacity of 800 seats. The Grand Theater is an asymmetrical-shaped building which has a capacity of 1,500 seats. The Blue Box for experimental performances has a capacity of 500 seats. The building is owned by the Department of Cultural Affairs, Taipei City Government.

== Transportation ==
The center is accessible from Jiantan Station of Taipei Metro.

=== Gallery ===
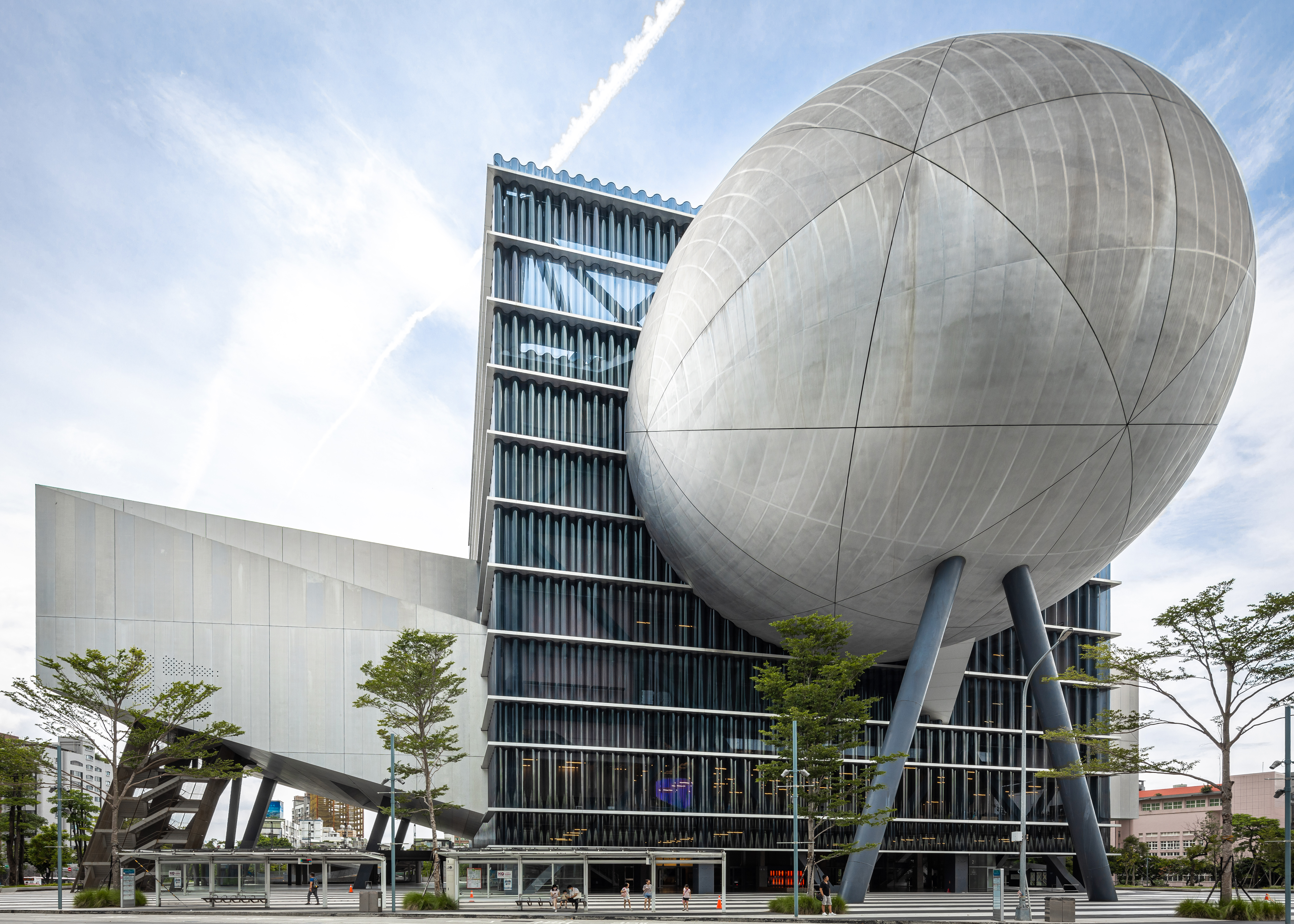
Taipei Performing Arts Center in 2023

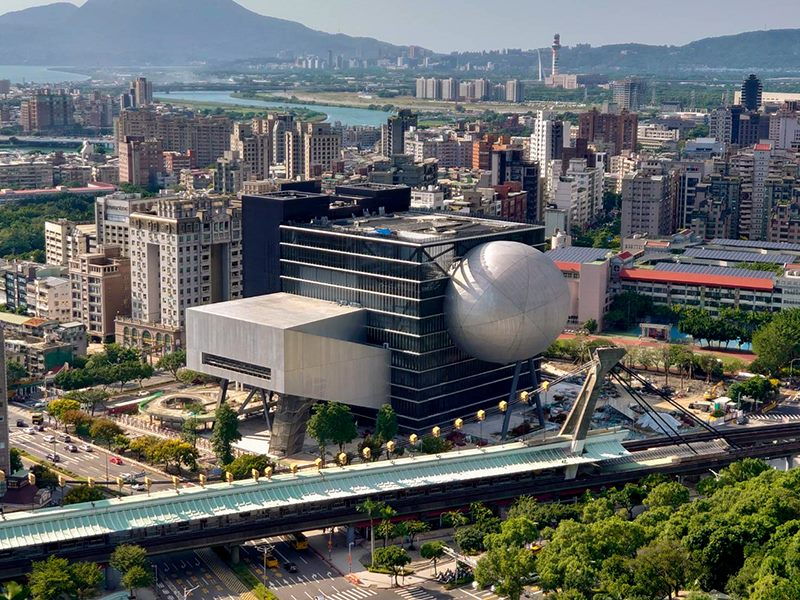
Aerial photograph

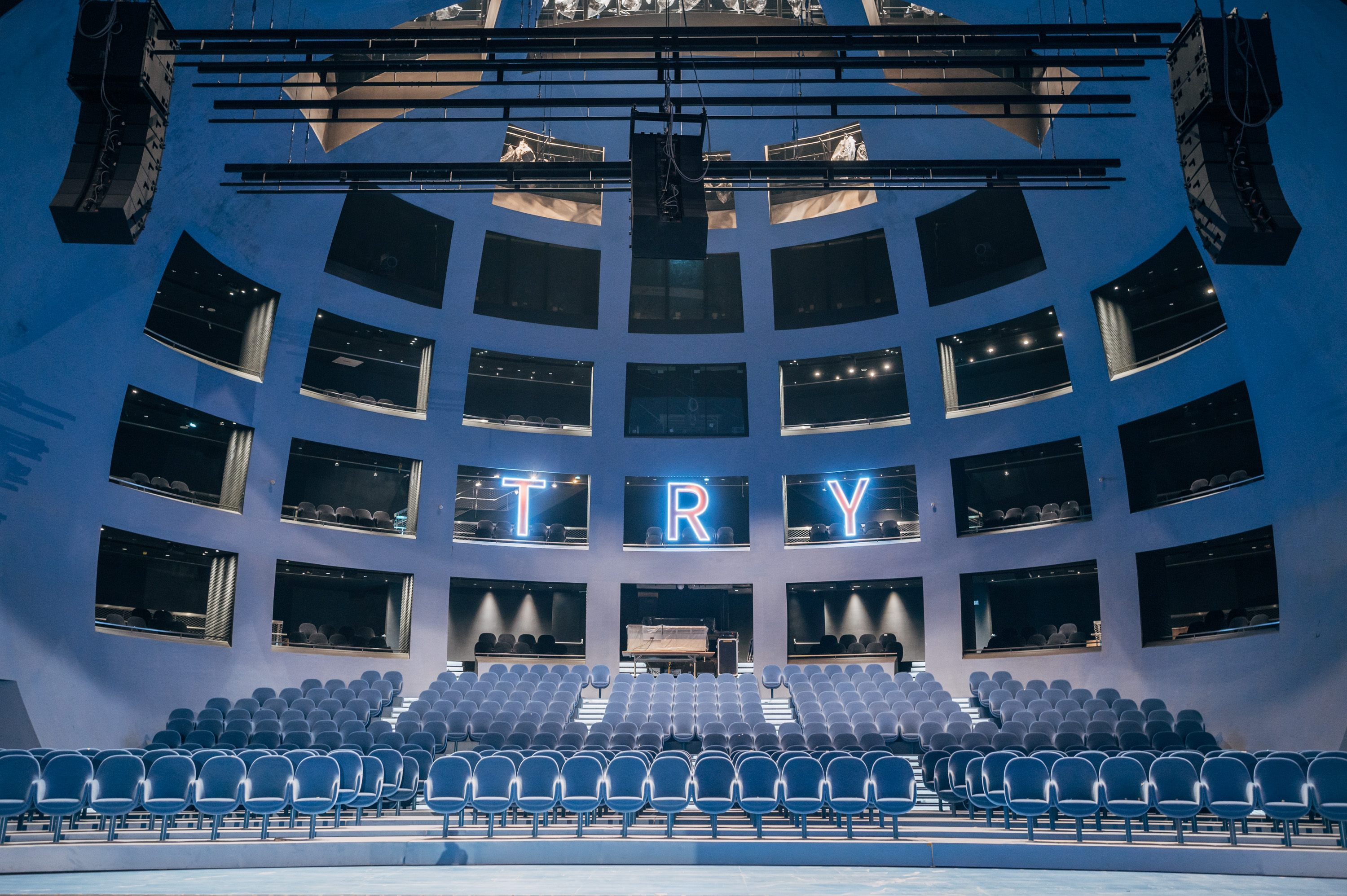
Globe Playhouse interior

== See also ==
- List of tourist attractions in Taiwan
