= Simone Veil Bridge =

Bridge in Bordeaux, France

Pont Simone Veil
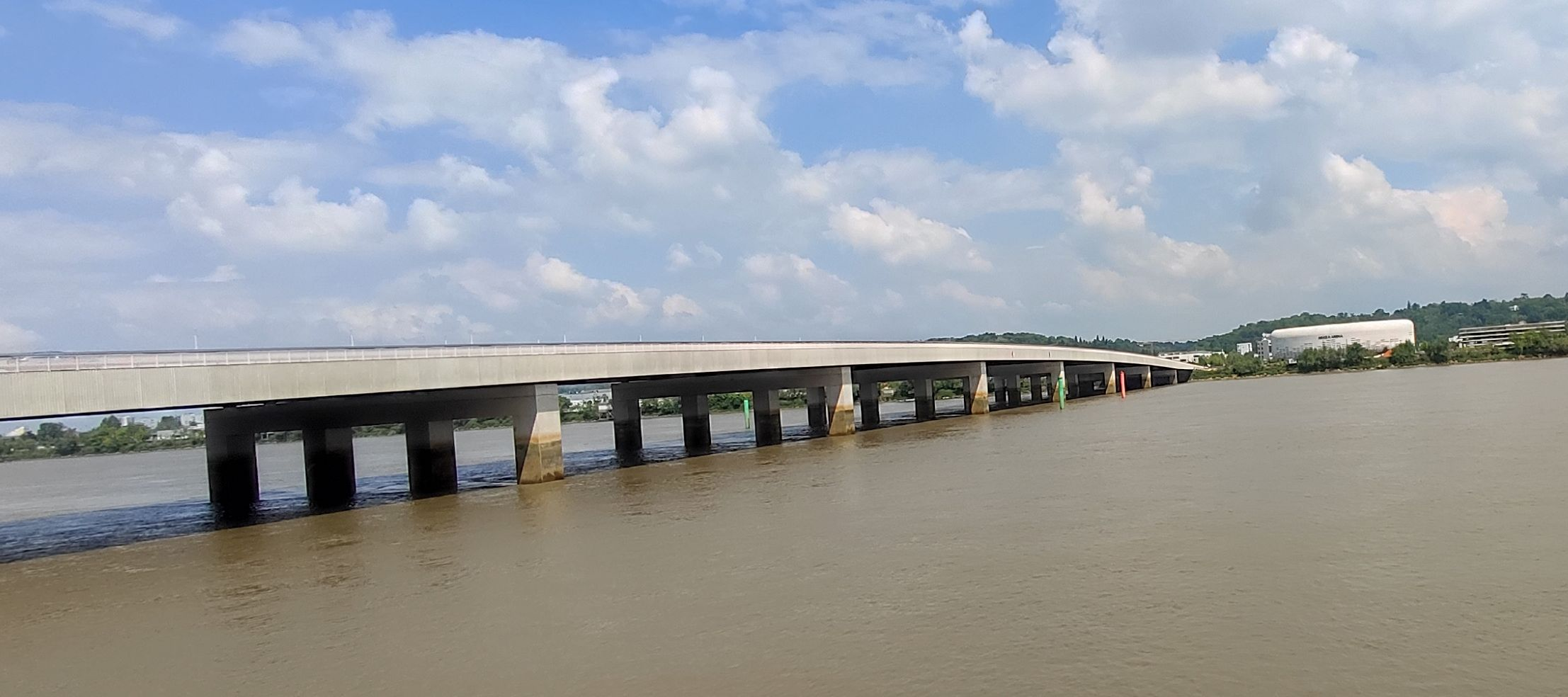
- Coordinates: 44°49′N 0°32′W
- Crosses: Garonne river
- Locale: Bordeaux

Characteristics
- Design: Beam bridge
- Material: Concrete and steel
- Total length: 545 m (1,788 ft)
- Width: 55 m (180 ft) to 45 m (148 ft)
- Height: 77 m (253 ft)

History
- Construction start: 2016
- Construction end: 2024
- Opened: 2024

Location
- Interactive map of Pont Simone Veil

The Simone Veil Bridge (French: Pont Simone Veil) is a passageway across the Garonne river in Bordeaux, France. It was designed by OMA/Rem Koolhaas. It is the overall widest bridge in Europe, measuring 550 meters long and 44 meters wide, purposely doubled in width with a massive concrete platform for pedestrians, bicyclists. and public transit. All of the modes of transport on the bridge have their own dedicated lanes, with the largest being for foot traffic.

It is named for the French magistrate, politician, and Holocaust survivor Simone Veil (1927–2017).

The bridge opened in 2024 and is now the sixth crossing over the river Garonnae.
