= Ashley Zelinskie =

American visual artist

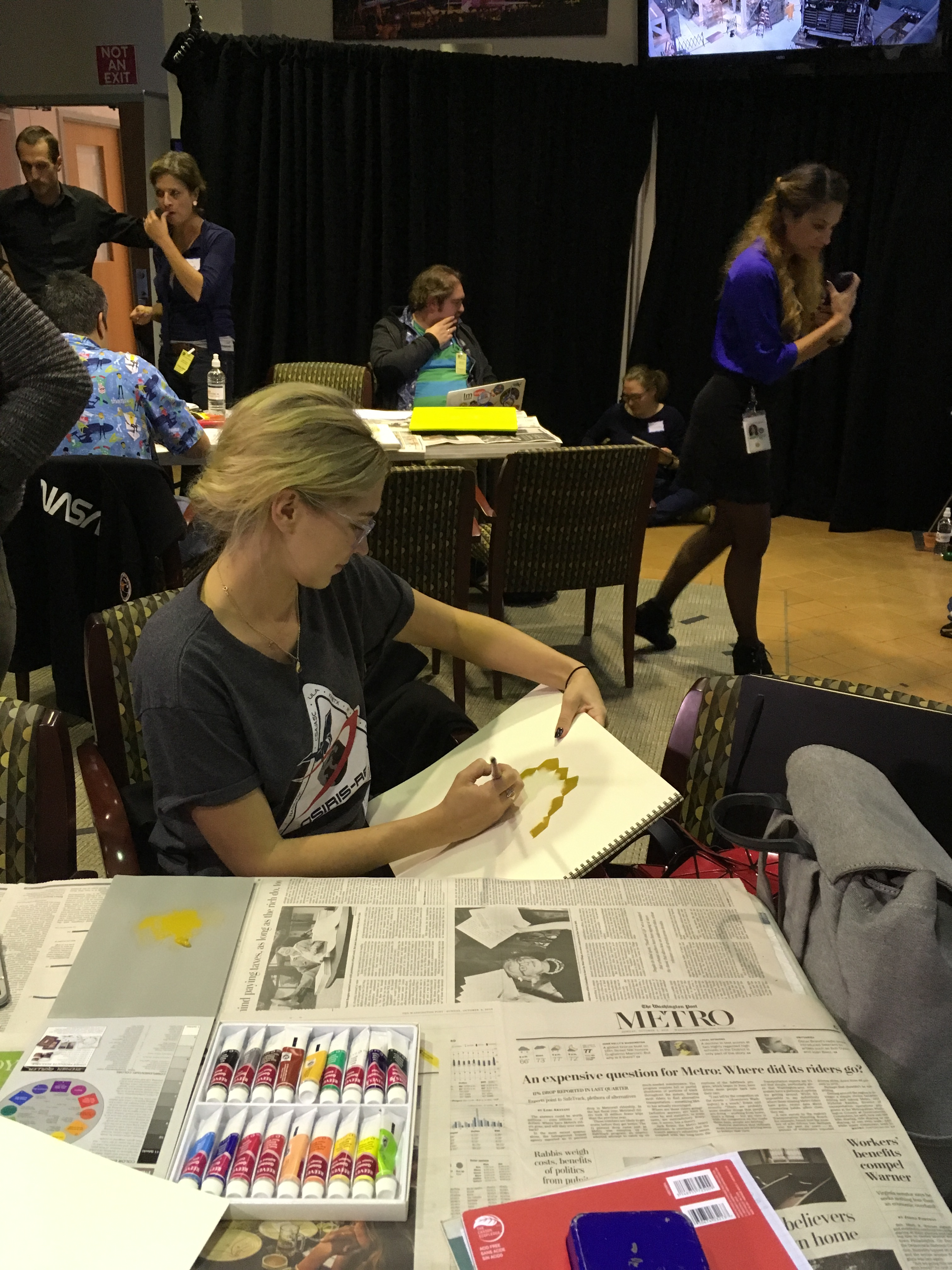
- Education: Rhode Island School of Design
- Known for: Digital art, 3D printing
- Website: ashleyzelinskie.com

Ashley Zelinskie is a contemporary visual artist who uses 3D printing and other digital technology to create her work.

She is a former resident of NEW INC, the New Museum's Art and Technology Incubator. She began working in collaboration with NASA in 2021. She is a graduate of the Rhode Island School of Design.

Zelinskie is vegetarian.
