= MEETT Toulouse Exhibition and Convention Centre =

- MEETT site
- MEETT site logo

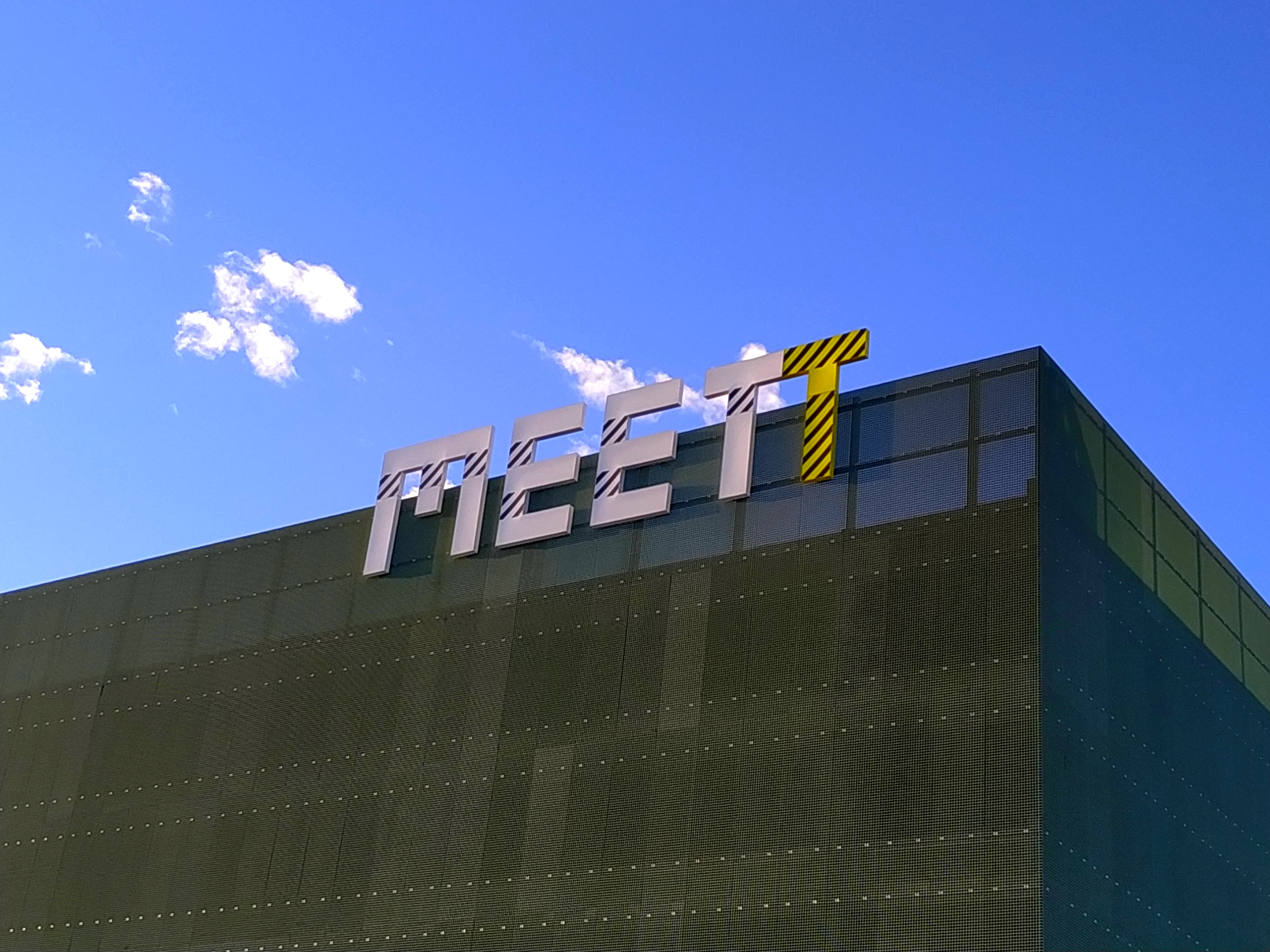
- MEETT site in 2019

- Location within France
- Address: MEETT Exhibition, Convention & Conference Centre, Concorde Avenue, 31840 Aussonne, Tram T1 – Bus L30; Toulouse; France
- Coordinates: 43.66540299817507°N 1.3540519391895687°E
- Owner: Toulouse événements (subsidiary of GL events)
- Type: Exhibition centre, convention & conference centre
- Events: Conferences, conventions, trade fairs/exhibitions, cultural, sports, political etc.
- Surface: 97 000 m² surface area
- Parking: 75 000m² (A silo car park for 3,000 cars)

Construction
- Opened: 28 September 2020
- Architects: Clément Blanchet, Marcus Franck, Gilles Guyot
- Project manager: Toulouse events

Website
- meett.fr

MEETT Toulouse Exhibition and Convention Centre (MEETT meaning: Meet Toulouse) is the one of the largest exhibition centers in France, located in Toulouse. It is designed and built by Office for Metropolitan Architecture (OMA).

== The venue ==
The centre was inaugurated on September 28, 2020.

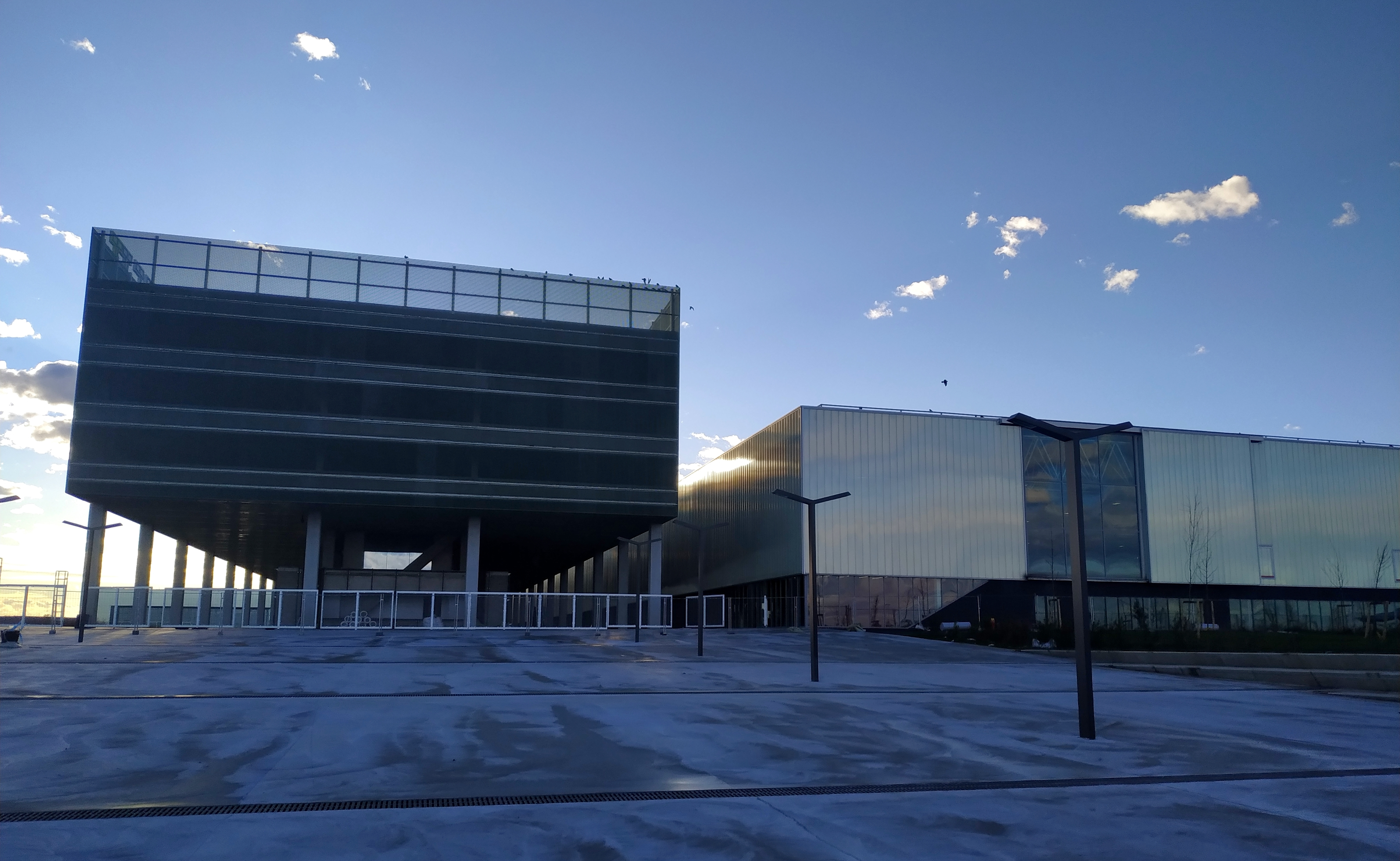
MEETT site forecourt in 2019
