= Jeff Daly =

Architect, museum gallery and exhibition designer

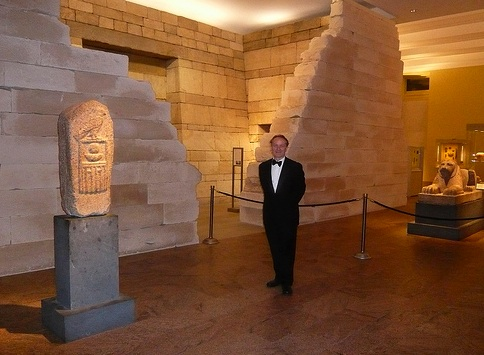
Jeff Daly at the Metropolitan Museum of Art.

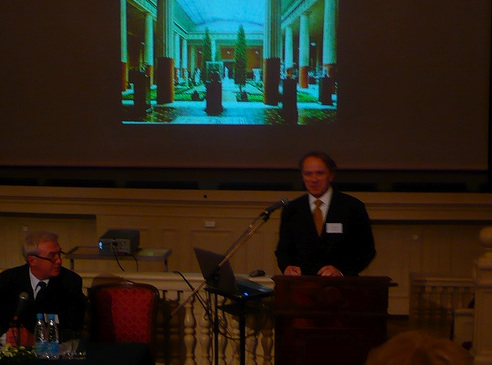
Daly at the Hermitage lecture.

Jeffrey L. Daly is an American designer, specialising in museum gallery and exhibition design.

== Design career ==
Daly received a master's degree from the Rochester Institute of Technology. He served as the Head of Design of the Metropolitan Museum of Art, New York, United States, from 1979 to 2006. From 2006 to 2009, he worked as the Senior Design Advisor to the Director for capital and special projects. He started his own consulting firm after leaving the Metropolitan and worked on new galleries, exhibitions and renovations at the Gibbes Museum, Morgan Library, Indianapolis Museum of Art, Driehaus Museum, Ringling Museum and several exhibits for The Winter Show at the Park Avenue Armory.

During Daly's tenure, the Metropolitan Museum of Art expanded or renovated nearly continuously, and Daly was the designer in charge of many of the museum's most well-known public spaces, including the galleries of Greek and Roman art, the European Paintings galleries, the Ancient Near East Galleries, and the renovation of the Egyptian wing. In addition to designing most of the permanent galleries, he was exhibit designer of hundreds of special exhibits ranging across all departments. In 2008 he designed the special exhibit celebrating the highlights of 30 years of Met collecting to honor the retirement of the director Philippe de Montebello. During his years at the Metropolitan he worked closely with Diana Vreeland and Anna Wintour on a series of special exhibits for the Costume Institute.
