= Lisa Park (artist) =

Korean-American artist (born 1987)

Lisa Park (born 1987) is a Korean-American artist and lecturer in the Fine Arts & Design department of the Stuart Weitzman School of Design at the University of Pennsylvania.

== Early life and education ==
Lisa Park was born in Boston, United States, but was raised Seoul, South Korea.She earned her BFA degree from the Art Center College of Design in Pasadena, California. Additionally, she holds a MPS degree from the Interactive Telecommunications Program (ITP) at the New York University Tisch School of the Arts.

== Career ==
Her works include "Eunoia" and "Eunoia II," which are interactive installation and performance pieces where the artist utilizes a brainwave sensor to visualize real-time pools of water based on her thoughts.

Park "has been working with biofeedback devices (heart rate sensors, commercial brainwave headsets) to display auditory and visual representations of physiological measurements. These performances explored the possibilities of self-monitoring her physical and psychological states." This was done by using electroencephalography (E.E.G.) data to create sound-waves which were pushed through pools of water, causing them to ripple. Park sat in the center of the pools as this occurred.

For Eunoia, Park separated the E.E.G. data into five emotions, each of which fed into one of five pools of water. For Eunoia II, she expanded her conception of brain activity to cover forty-eight pools of water, matching the forty-eight emotions described by philosopher Baruch Spinoza. While Park strove to control her emotions in Eunoia in order to keep the pools of water still, she changed her approach in Eunoia II to focus on expressing emotions.

Another installation piece, titled "Blooming," was commissioned by Nokia Bell Labs and supported by New Museum's NEW INC. This interactive audiovisual installation features a life-sized digital cherry blossom tree that blossoms in real-time in response to participants' skin-to-skin contact.

== Exhibitions ==
Year	Exhibition
2022	Trapholt Museum for Moderne Kunst, Denmark
2021	National Museum of Modern and Contemporary Art, South Korea; Ocean Flower Island Museum, China
2020	IA&A at Hillyer, Washington D.C; LABoral Centro de Arte y Creación Industrial, Spain; Cheongju Museum of Art, South Korea
2019	ArtScience Museum, Singapore; Apple Carnegie Library, Washington D.C; Museum of Contemporary Art Busan, South Korea; ARTECHOUSE, Washington D.C; SXSW Art (South by South West), Austin, Texas
2018	MANA Contemporary (Nokia Bell Labs X NEW INC), "Only Human", NJ
2017	MANA Contemporary BSMT "Flatland", Miami, FL; Simons Center gallery, "Manifesting Invisibles", Stony Brook, NY; Hong Kong Art Centre, Pao Galleries, "ifva award", Hong Kong
2016	Smithsonian Asian Pacific American Center, "CTRL+ALT", New York, NY; Nuit Blanche Toronto, "And the Transformation Reveals", Toronto, Canada; Storefront for Art and Architecture, "Work in Progress", New York, NY; MassArt, "Encircling the World", Boston, MA
2015	Today's Art Festival 2015, Hague, The Netherlands; Red Bull Studios, "NEW INC End-of-Year Showcase", New York, NY; Reverse gallery, "SYNAESTHETICS", Brooklyn, NY
2014	Digital Art Center, "Digital Art Festival 2014", Taipei, Taiwan; New York Hall of Science, "Maker Faire", Corona, NY

== Awards and fellowships ==
Park was the recipient of a 2014 New York Foundation for the Arts Fellowship

Park was selected to be an artist-in-residence at Nokia Bell Labs in 2017 as part of their Experiments in Art and Technology residency program with NEW INC. As part of the residency, Park was commissioned to create, "Blooming," which was featured in the exhibition Only Human at Mana Contemporary in May 2017 Blooming was an official selection of SXSW Art in 2019.

== Academic profession ==
Since the Fall semester of 2023, Park has been a lecturer within the Fine Arts and Design department at the University of Pennsylvania.
