= REX (architecture firm) =

American architecture firm

Practice information
- Key architects: Joshua Ramus
- Founded: 2000
- Location: New York, New York

Significant works and honors
- Buildings: Perelman Performing Arts Center; Museum Plaza

Website
- www.rex-ny.com

REX is an architecture and design firm based in New York City. The firm's name is intended to symbolize reappraisal ("RE") of architecture ("X"). Notable projects headed by its founder include the Dee and Charles Wyly Theatre in Dallas, Texas; the Vakko Fashion Center in Istanbul, Turkey; and the Seattle Central Library. The work of REX has been recognized with accolades including two American Institute of Architects' National Honor Awards in 2005 and 2011, a U.S. Institute for Theatre Technology National Honor Award, an American Library Association National Building Award, and two American Council of Engineering Companies' National Gold Awards.

== History ==
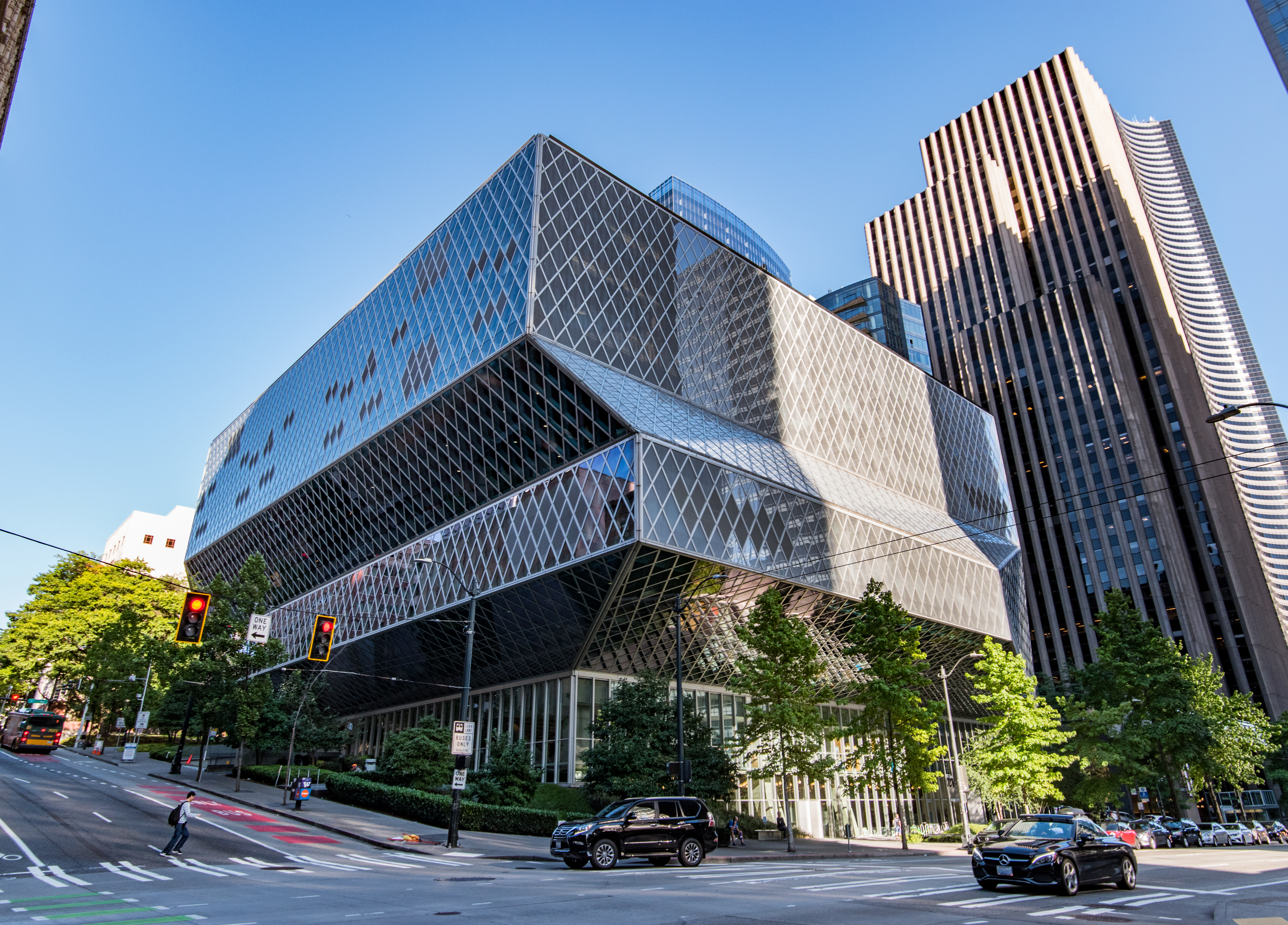
Seattle Central Library, Seattle, WA

REX's 10 designers are led by Joshua Prince-Ramus, who was founding partner of OMA New York —the American affiliate of the Office for Metropolitan Architecture/Rem Koolhaas—until he left to start REX in 2006.

While at OMA New York, Prince-Ramus was Partner in Charge of the Guggenheim-Hermitage Museum in Las Vegas and the Seattle Central Library, hailed as Time's 2004 Building of the year and by Herbert Muschamp in The New York Times as "the most exciting new building it has been an honor to review in more than 30 years of writing about architecture." In 2005, the Seattle Central Library was awarded the top honors bestowed by the American Institute of Architects, the American Library Association, and the American Council of Engineering Companies. The Library was one of seven finalists for the inaugural Mies Crown Hall Americas Prize, awarded in 2014 to the best architectural work in North and South America completed from 2000 to 2013.

== Projects ==
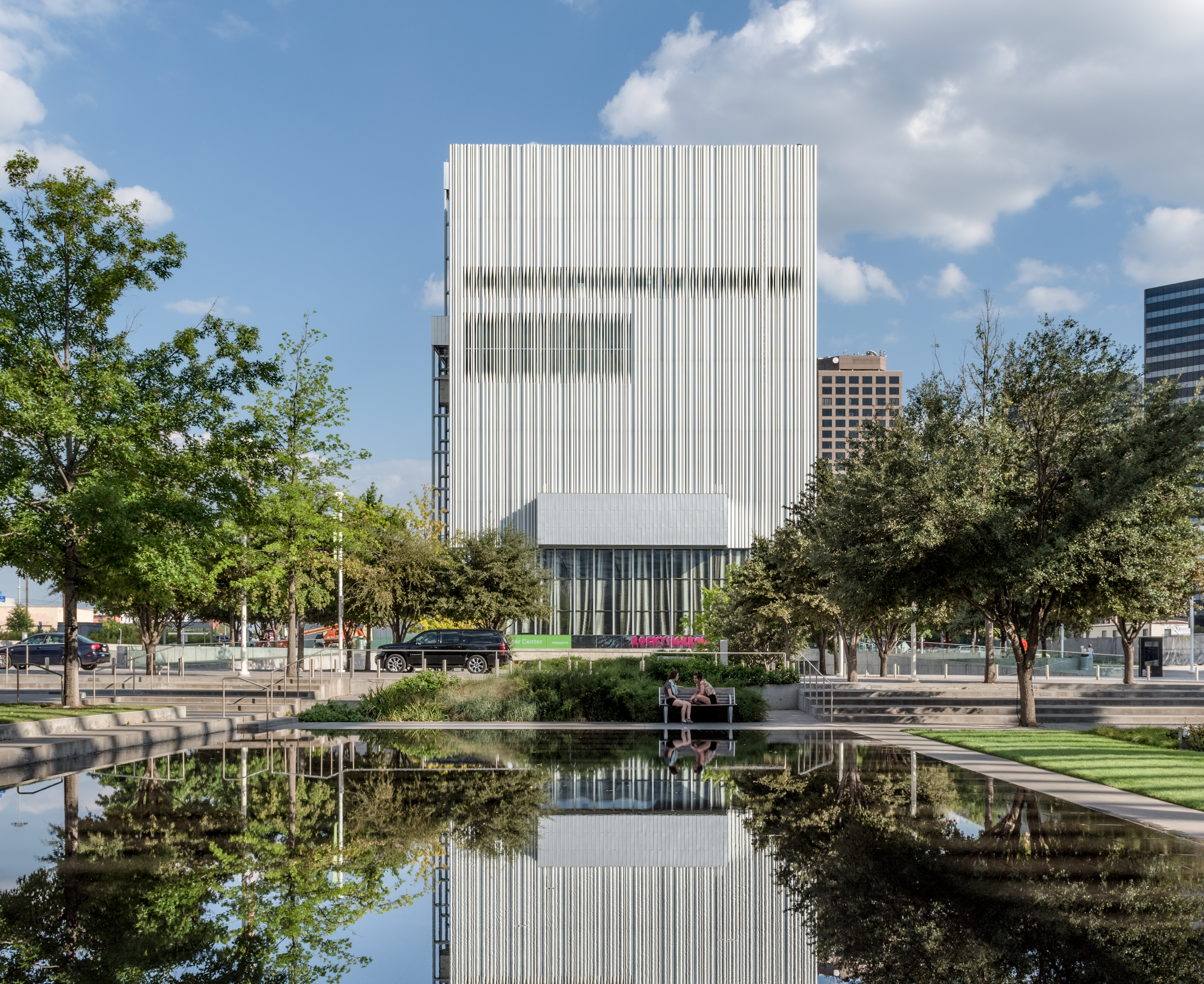
AT&T Performing Arts Center's Dee and Charles Wyly Theatre, Dallas, TX

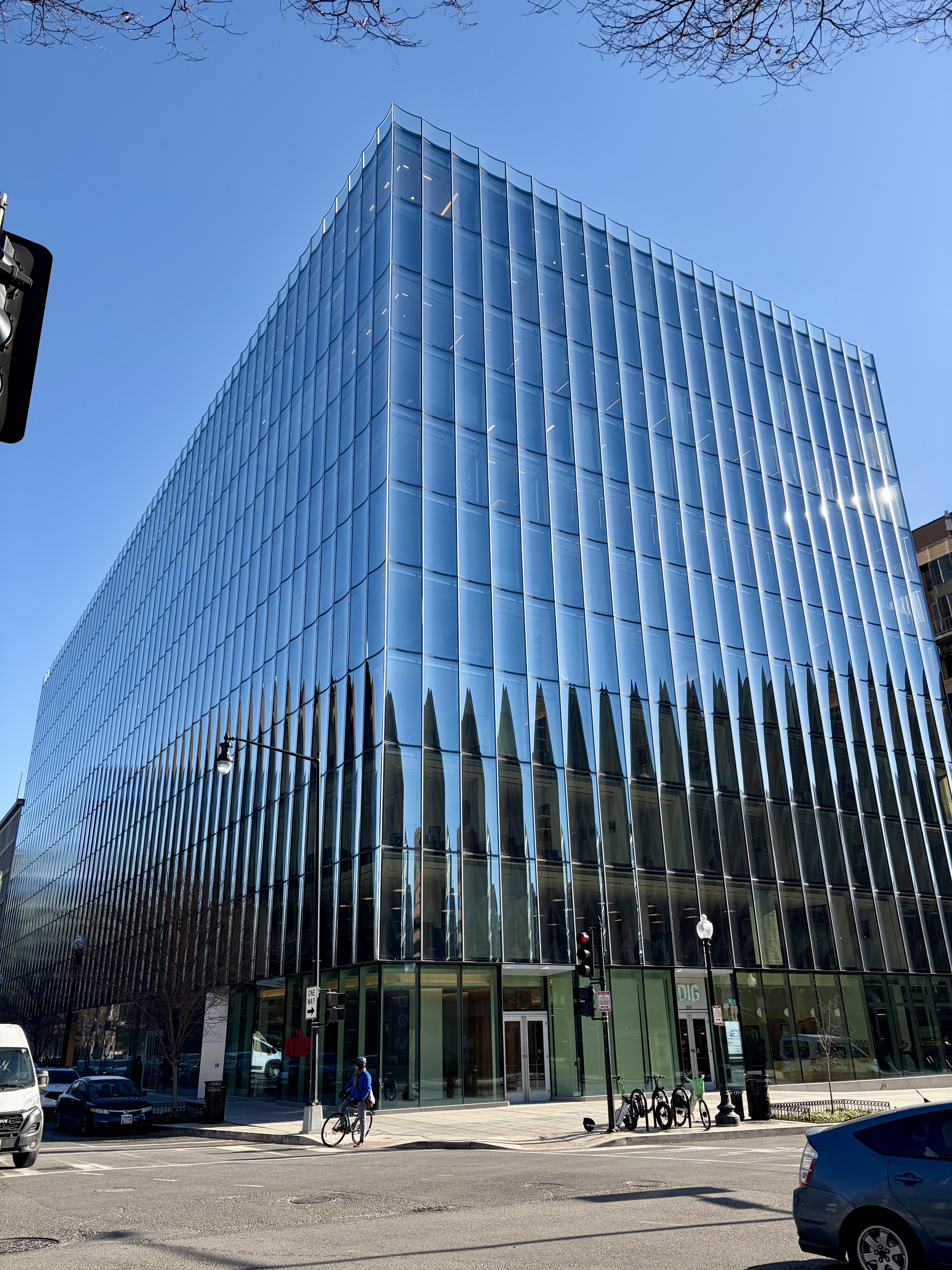
2050 M Street NW, an office building in downtown Washington, D.C.

Ongoing projects include the Performing Arts Center at the World Trade Center, an 80,000 sq ft (7,400 m^{2}) building for the production and premiering of theater, dance, music, musical theater, opera, and film works; the Mercedes-Benz Future Lab in Stuttgart, Germany, a 110,000 sq ft (10,200 m^{2}) public showcase for the brand's impact on mobility and a factory for debating the future; a 46,000 sq ft (4,300 m^{2}) private residence on Long Island; 2050 M Street, a new office building in Washington, DC, and a performing arts center at Brown University.

Completed projects include the re-cladding and interior renovation of Five Manhattan West

- Lindemann Performing Arts Center (commenced 2019), Brown University, Providence, Rhode Island
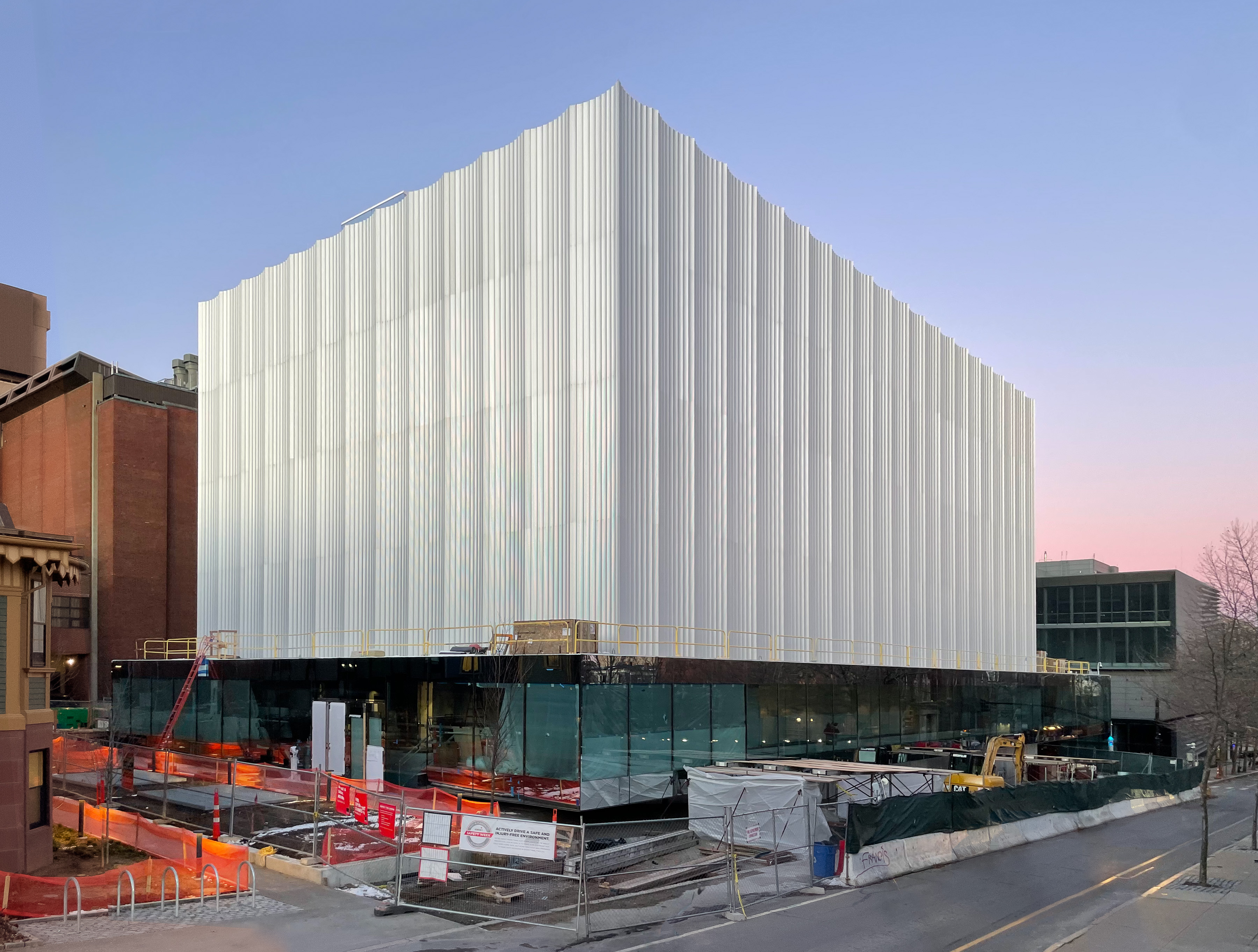
  Brown University's Lindemann Performing Arts Center, Providence, RI
- Ronald O. Perelman Performing Arts Center, (commenced 2015), New York, New York
- 2050 M Street (2019 completion), Washington, DC
- Necklace Residence (2018 completion), New York, New York
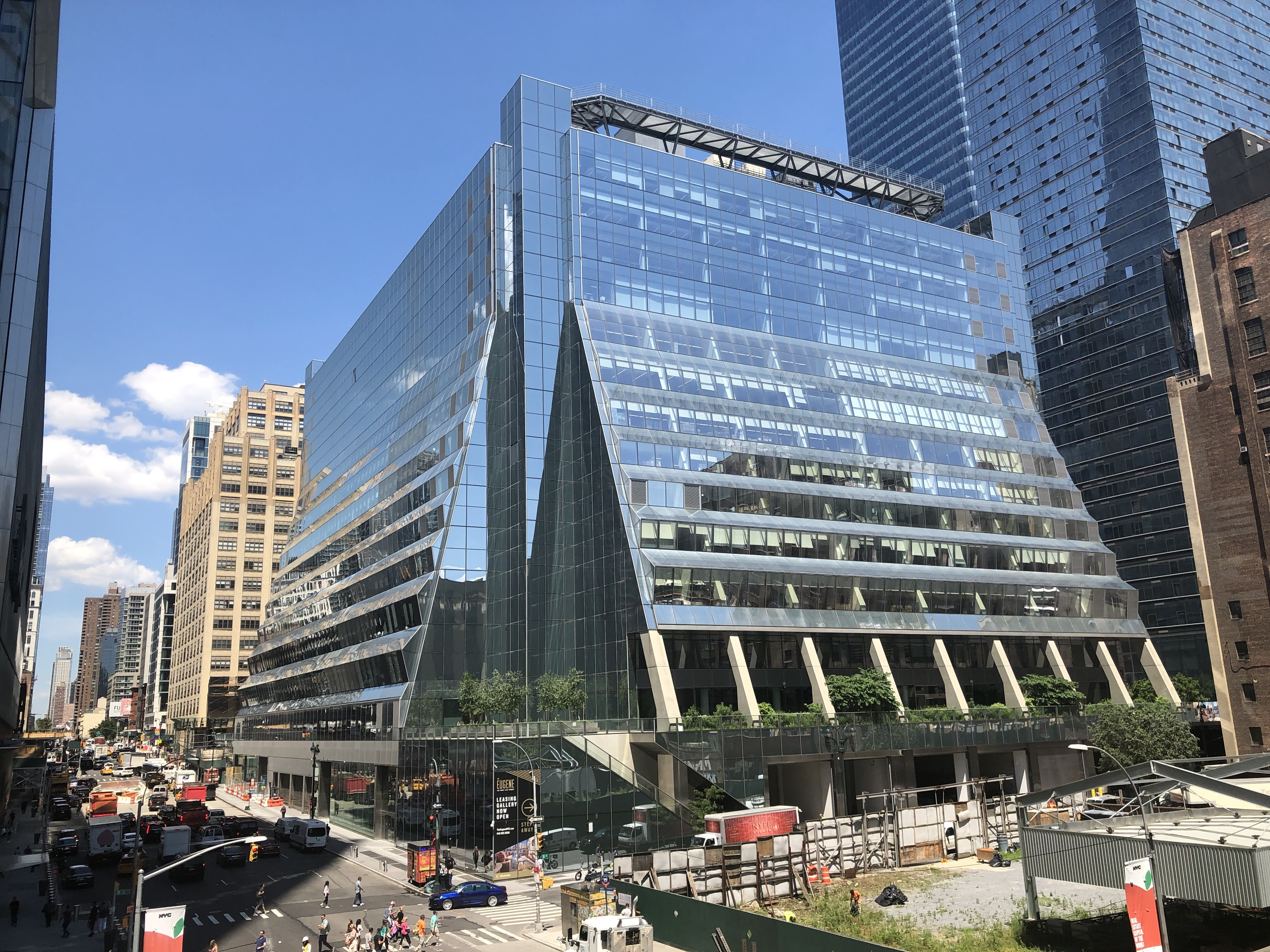
- Five Manhattan West, New York City, NY
  Five Manhattan West (2016 completion), New York, New York
- Mercedes-Benz Future Lab & Campus Extension (invited competition 2012), Stuttgart, Germany
- Vakko Fashion Center and Power Media Center (2010), Istanbul, Turkey
- Dee and Charles Wyly Theatre (2009), AT&T Performing Arts Center, Dallas, Texas
- Vestbane (2007), Oslo, Norway
- Annenberg Center for Information Science and Technology II at the California Institute of Technology (2006), Pasadena, California
- Museum Plaza (2005), Louisville, Kentucky
- Seattle Central Library (2004), Seattle, Washington
- Guggenheim-Hermitage Museum and Guggenheim Las Vegas Museum (2001), Las Vegas, Nevada

== Awards ==
- 2016 Architect, Progressive Architecture Award (Yongsan International Business District "Project R6")
- 2015 AIANY, Honor Award in Architecture Category (Vakko Fashion Center and Power Media Center)
- 2014 Architizer, A+ Award in Architecture + Technology (Equator Tower)
- 2014 AZ, Best Unbuilt Competition Entry, Jury Award and People's Choice (Media Headquarters Buildings)
- 2014 Chicago Athenaeum Museum of Architecture and Design and the European Center for Architecture, Art, Design and Urban Studies, American Architecture Award (Yongsan International Business District "Project R6")
- 2013 Architizer, A+ Awards for Low Rise Office Building (Vakko Fashion Center and Power Media Center)
- 2012 U.S. Institute for Theatre Technology, National Honor Award (Dee and Charles Wyly Theatre)
- 2012 AZ, Best Unbuilt Competition Scheme, People's Choice (CLC & MSFL Towers)
- 2011 ICON magazine, Award for the World's Coolest Office (Vakko Fashion Center and Power Media Center)
- 2011 AIA, National Honor Award (Dee and Charles Wyly Theatre)
- 2010 American Council of Engineering Companies, Engineering Excellence Grand Award (Dee and Charles Wyly Theatre)
- 2010 ArchDaily, Office Building of the Year (Vakko Fashion Center and Power Media Center)
- 2010 TEXO, Distinguished Building Award (Dee and Charles Wyly Theatre)
- 2010 Architype Review, Performing Arts Center: Most Notable North American Project (Dee and Charles Wyly Theatre)
- 2010 American Council of Engineering Companies, National Gold Award (Dee and Charles Wyly Theatre)
- 2009 ArchDaily, U.S.A Building of the Year (Dee and Charles Wyly Theatre)
- 2005 Wired magazine, Rave Award (Seattle Central Library)
- 2005 Travel + Leisure magazine, Design Award (Seattle Central Library)
- 2005 GQ magazine, 25 Buildings Every Man Should Know (Seattle Central Library)
- 2005 Condé Nast Traveler magazine, Design Award (Seattle Central Library)
- 2005 SPACE magazine, Design Award (Seattle Central Library)
- 2005 ASCE, Honor Award for Excellence in Engineering (Seattle Central Library)
- 2005 AIA/ALA, Library Building Award (Seattle Central Library)
- 2005 ACEC of Washington, Gold Award (Seattle Central Library)
- 2005 ACEC of Washington, Platinum Award (Seattle Central Library)
- 2005 AIA, National Honor Award (Seattle Central Library)
- 2004 LEED, Silver Certification (Seattle Central Library)
- 2004 TIME magazine, Building of the Year (Seattle Central Library)
- 2004 Los Angeles Times, Best Reviewed Buildings (Seattle Central Library)
- 2004 The New York Times, Most Exciting Building Ever Reviewed (Seattle Central Library)
- 2003 Canadian Institute of Steel Construction, Krentz Award (Seattle Central Library)
- 2001 Seattle Design Commission, Design Excellence Award (Seattle Central Library)

== Videos ==
- Joshua Prince-Ramus at TEDxSMU, 2009, 18 minutes, 58 seconds, color.
- Joshua Prince-Ramus: Building a Theater that Remakes Itself, 2009, 18 minutes, 42 seconds, color.
- Joshua Prince-Ramus: Behind the Design of Seattle's Library, 2006, 19 minutes, 58 seconds, color.
