= Perelman Performing Arts Center =

Performing arts center in Manhattan, New York

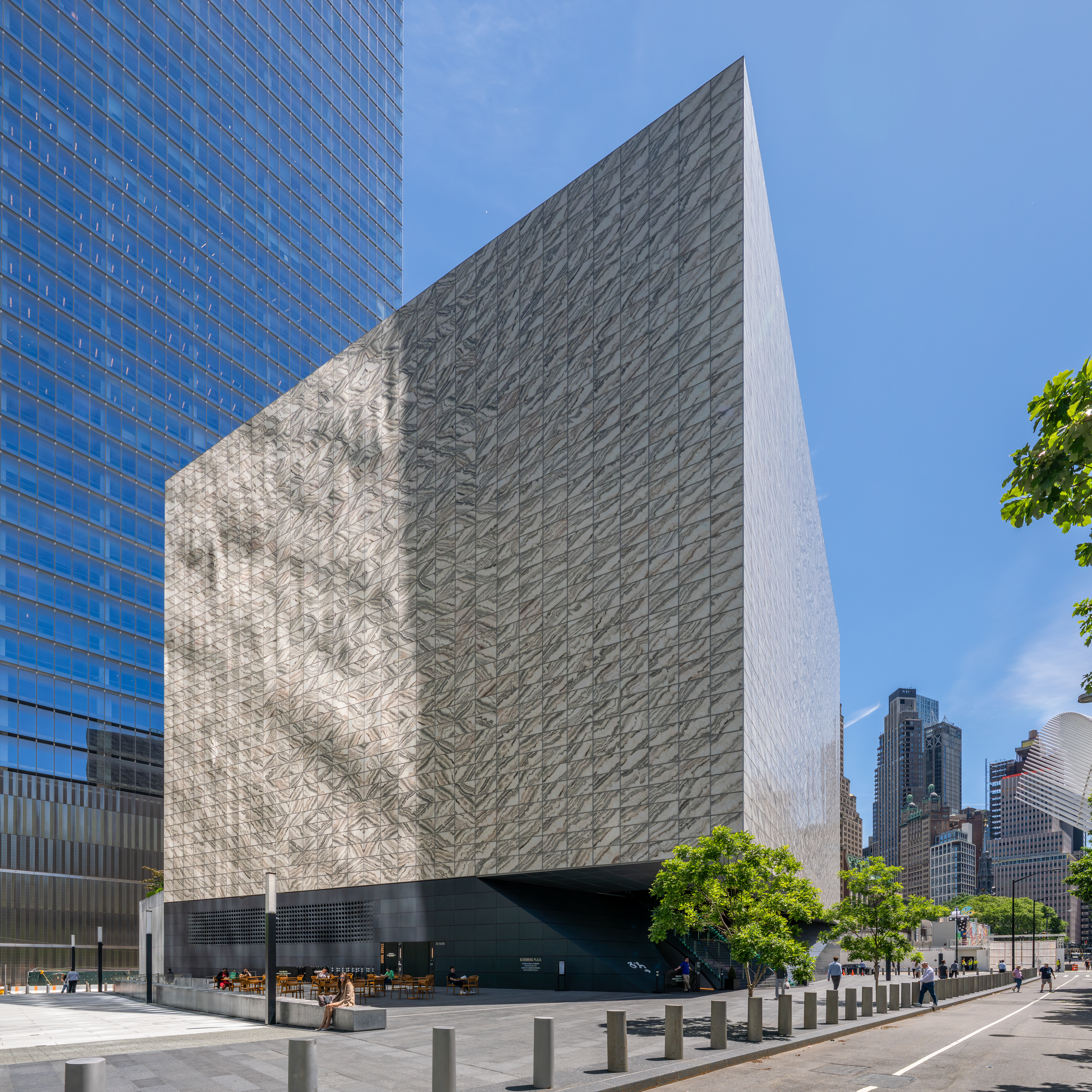
- Perelman Performing Arts Center in 2026.
- Alternative names: PAC WTC; 6 World Trade Center; 6 WTC

General information
- Status: Open
- Location: 251 Fulton Street; Manhattan, New York City, United States
- Coordinates: 40°42′45.3″N 74°0′44.5″W
- Construction started: August 31, 2017
- Opening: September 13, 2023
- Cost: $275 million
- Owner: Port Authority of New York and New Jersey
- Operator: World Trade Center Performing Arts Center, Inc.

Height
- Height: 138 feet (42 m)

Design and construction
- Architects: Joshua Ramus (REX), Davis Brody Bond

Other information
- Public transit: World Trade Center (PATH), WTC Cortlandt, Chambers Street–World Trade Center/Park Place/Cortlandt Street, Fulton Street, Battery Park City Ferry Terminal, Staten Island Ferry Whitehall Terminal

Website
- Official website

The Perelman Performing Arts Center, also known as 6 World Trade Center (6 WTC) and branded as PAC NYC, is a multi-space performing arts center at the northeast corner of the World Trade Center complex in Manhattan, New York City. The Performing Arts Center is located at the intersection of Vesey, Fulton, and Greenwich Streets in Lower Manhattan. The building is named for billionaire Ronald Perelman, who donated $75 million to its construction.

Plans for the Performing Arts Center were first announced by the Lower Manhattan Development Corporation (LMDC) in 2004 as part of the rebuilding of the World Trade Center site after the September 11 attacks. Gehry Partners LLP and Snøhetta were selected as the original designers, but plans were repeatedly stalled and later scrapped. Joshua Ramus and Davis Brody Bond were selected as architects in 2015, joined by Magnusson Klemencic Associates as the structural engineer. Below-ground construction began in August 2017, followed by the construction of the above-ground frame in 2020. The center, known during construction as the Ronald O. Perelman Performing Arts Center at the World Trade Center, opened on September 13, 2023. The Performing Arts Center includes approximately 90,000 square feet (8,400 m^{2}) across three floors.

== Development ==
=== Original design ===
Original Gehry model

After the World Trade Center was destroyed during the September 11 attacks in 2001, officials sought to redevelop the site. Daniel Libeskind's 2003 design for the new World Trade Center, known as Memory Foundations, included space for a performing arts center at the site. The Lower Manhattan Development Corporation (LMDC) announced on October 12, 2004, that Gehry Partners LLP and Snøhetta, an architectural firm from Norway, would design the Performing Arts Center. Gehry's proposal, which incorporated a boxlike design, would have housed the Joyce Theater, as the Signature Theatre Company had dropped out due to space constraints and cost limitations. Then-mayor Michael Bloomberg announced in 2010 that he would provide $100 million for the theater's construction from a federal fund dedicated to projects in Lower Manhattan.

Maggie Boepple was appointed as the Performing Arts Center's president in March 2012. Plans for the construction of the Performing Arts Center were reportedly stalled over financing and design, although construction was also hindered by the presence of the entrance to the PATH train's temporary World Trade Center station within its footprint. In February 2014, David Lan, artistic director of London's Young Vic Theatre, was announced as consulting artistic director of the Performing Arts Center, a position he was to hold simultaneously with his Young Vic leadership. The venue's mission was revised to originate works of theater, music, and dance in three small flexible theaters.

=== Redesign ===
By September 2014, Gehry Associates were no longer connected with the project. Plans were proceeding for the choice of a new architect and future programming for a 2019 opening. Gehry's design was scrapped; the board of the Performing Arts Center planned to choose a new design from one of three other architects. This change came after Boepple was said to have disapproved of Gehry's work.

In July 2015, it was reported that the construction budget for the Performing Arts Center was to be reduced from $350 million to $200 million. The Lower Manhattan Development Corporation (LMDC) announced at a board meeting that the $99 million in federal funds committed to the project was contingent on the arts center's leaders' "producing an affordable design and a viable plan for raising the remaining money from private sources". In November 2015, the Performing Arts Center announced that they had awarded the design architect contract to Joshua Ramus of REX, with the firm Davis Brody Bond serving as executive architect.

On March 3, 2016, the permanent PATH station building opened one block to the south, and the temporary entrance was closed. The opening of the new station building allowed the temporary station entrance to be demolished in August of that year. This, in turn, allowed the construction of the Performing Arts Center on the site.

On June 29, 2016, billionaire Ronald Perelman donated $75 million to the construction and endowment of the Performing Arts Center at the World Trade Center. The donation funded part of the Performing Arts Center's construction, as well as provided an endowment and funded the operations. The center was renamed for Perelman. The project also received $130 million from Michael Bloomberg (although this was not disclosed until 2023) and had previously obtained $100 million from the LMDC. In September 2016, Barbra Streisand was named the chairwoman of the center's board. The concept art for the new building was revealed that month, with mostly positive reviews from architecture critics. On March 27, 2017, it was announced that construction would be delayed due to ongoing disputes between the Lower Manhattan Development Corporation (LMDC) and the Port Authority regarding funding for the project.

=== Construction ===
Preliminary site plans for the World Trade Center rebuild

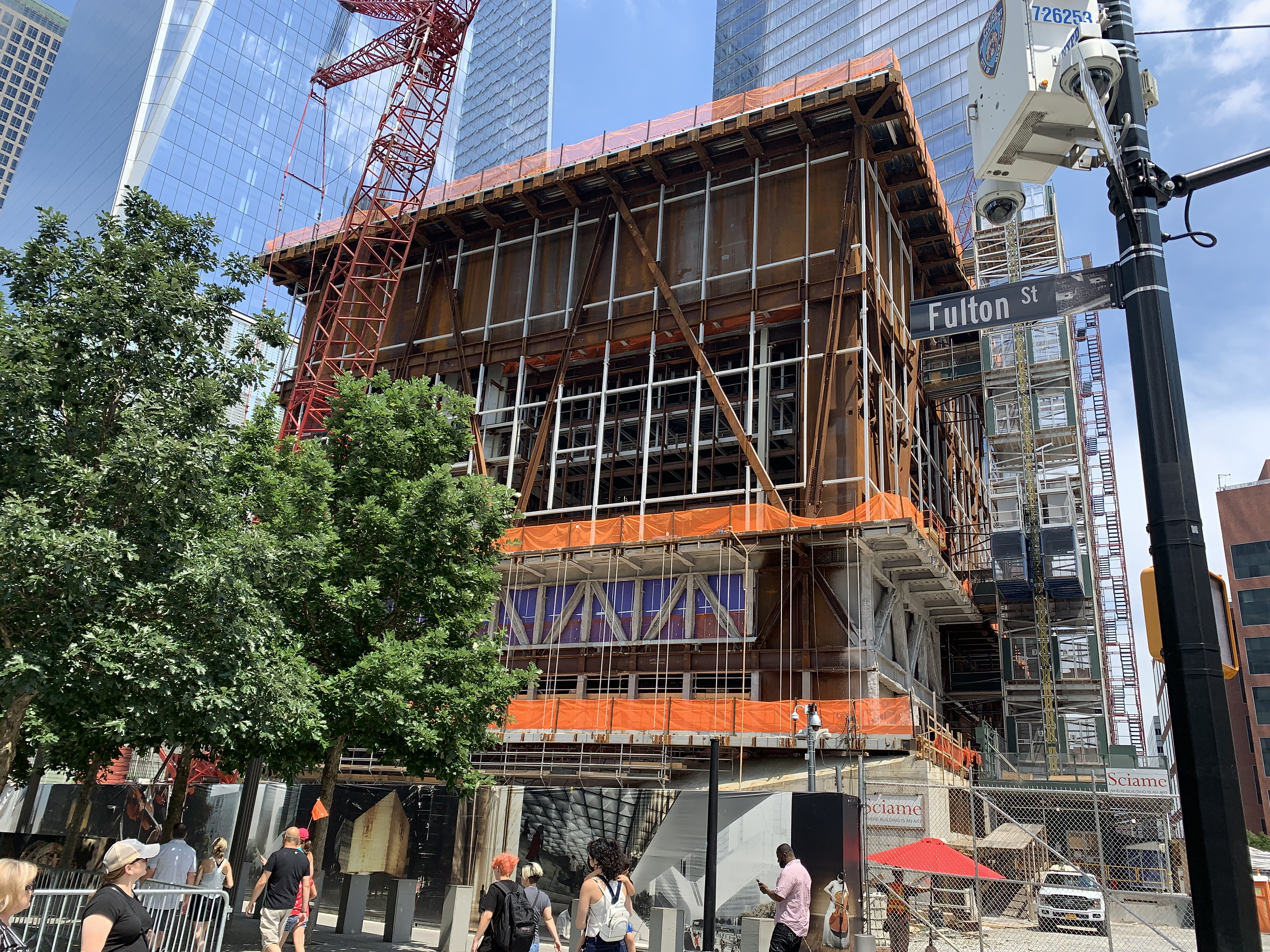
Construction on the Performing Arts Center in June 2021

Construction began in August 2017 on its below-grade parking garage, which will be accessible from the rear of the building on Vesey Street. Work on the building itself was originally expected to begin in 2018, with an estimated 2020 completion date and opening. The Port Authority gave the Performing Arts Center a 99-year lease in February 2018, and Bill Rauch was appointed as the new artistic director. The first pieces of structural steel arrived that April. Work was halted in early 2018 due to financial disagreements between the Port Authority and LMDC, but routine steel work and concrete pouring resumed shortly thereafter. The Performing Arts Center received $89 million from the LMDC and the United States Department of Housing and Urban Development in December 2018.

Underground work was completed in July 2019, and steel construction began later that year. Leslie Koch was also named as the president of the Perelman Performing Arts Center that year, replacing Boepple. At the time, the Performing Arts Center was scheduled to open in 2021. The lead designer described the venue as resembling "multiple buildings being constructed inside the building—because it was". The building topped out on September 11, 2020, the 19th anniversary of the September 11 attacks. Khady Kamara of Second Stage Theater was appointed in October 2022 as the center's executive director.

== Opening and operation ==
Construction manager Sciame Construction conducted various tests and installed finishes on the center in mid-2023, in advance of a scheduled opening on September 15, 2023. A ribbon-cutting ceremony for the Perelman Performing Arts Center was hosted on September 13, 2023, two days ahead of schedule. The first public performance was scheduled for September 19. The venue had cost $560 million in total. Kamara stated that her mission was to convince visitors to travel to the World Trade Center for entertainment purposes. The center, branded as PAC NYC, planned to host dance, film, music concerts, opera, and theatrical productions. The Metropolis restaurant, operated by Marcus Samuelsson, opened at the Performing Arts Center in November 2023. Joseph Lebus also created a special typeface and a square logo as part of PAC NYC's brand.

During its initial season in 2023–2024, PAC NYC hosted performances such as Trinity Church Wall Street's concert series Refuge; a piano recital by Mahani Teave; Tamar-kali and Marc Bamuthi Joseph's opera Watch Night; and CATS: 'The Jellicle Ball'. In 2024, PAC NYC announced that it would develop 25 pieces over five years as part of its The Democracy Cycle series; the first eight works were produced during the 2024–2025 season.

== Architecture ==
The Perelman Performing Arts Center was designed by main architect REX, executive architect Davis Brody Bond, acoustic consultant Threshold Acoustics, and theatrical consultant Charcoalblue. The structural engineers on the project include Magnusson Klemencic Associates and Robert Silman Associates; the MEP, fire protection, IT and security engineer is Jaros, Baum & Bolles; and the construction manager is Sciame Construction, LLC. Other key contributors to the project team include David Rockwell's Rockwell Group, architect of the restaurant and lobby interiors; Charcoalblue, theater designer; and Tillotson Design Associates, architectural lighting designer.

=== Exterior ===
The Performing Arts Center measures 160 by 160 feet (49 by 49 m) across and 117 feet (36 m) tall, resting upon a black-granite pedestal that measures 21 feet (6.4 m) tall. The building's facade consists of 5,000 panels of veined Portuguese marble. The panels contain lozenge-shaped patterns and turn an amber color at night. The stone on the facade measures 0.5 inches (12.7 mm) thick and is covered in glass on both sides to reduce energy use and increase security. There are no windows on the facade; according to Ramus, this "keeps the buzz of theatergoers at a respectful distance from people who are paying tribute at the memorial, and vice versa". Just inside the facade, a corridor runs around the Performing Arts Center's auditoriums, with chandeliers that backlight the facade at night.

=== Interior ===
The venue includes 129,000 square feet (12,000 m^{2}) across three floors. The Performing Arts Center rests upon the footings of the first, unbuilt performing arts venue on the site. Due to the complexity of the infrastructure under the Performing Arts Center, the structure is connected to its foundations at only seven locations. The public floor is located at street level and houses a restaurant/bar to provide refreshments during intermissions. The second floor consists of rehearsal and dressing rooms for theater actors, and the third floor houses three theaters. The largest auditorium, named after businessman John Eugene Zuccotti, has 450 seats. Another auditorium named for director Mike Nichols has 250 seats, while the smallest space, named for philanthropist Doris Duke, has 99 seats.

All three theaters are designed so that the walls will be able to rotate and expand to provide extra space for a single theater if needed. The theaters can hold approximately 1,000 or 1,200 people combined. To reduce vibrations from nearby subway lines, the three theaters are separated from each other and from nearby structures by 1-foot-thick (0.30 m) pads. The floor and ceiling heights can also be modified, The auditoriums can be arranged in at least 60 configurations and can also be combined into a single space with 950 seats. The "guillotine doors" between each auditorium measure up to 46 short tons (41 long tons; 42 t) and can retract into mechanical spaces above each auditorium.

== Operation ==
Since 2022, Khady Kamara has been PAC NYC's executive director. Former mayor Michael Bloomberg is the chairman of PAC NYC's board of directors, while Bill Rauch is the artistic director. PAC NYC's inaugural artistic advisers included Murielle Borst-Tarrant, Ty Defoe, Wendall K. Harrington, David Henry Hwang, Lisa Kron, David Lan, Joe Melillo, Nico Muhly, Lynn Nottage, Arturo O'Farrill, Jason Samuels Smith, Sonya Tayeh, Julie Taymor, Ivo van Hove, Alexandria Wailes, and Jawole Willa Jo Zollar.

== Reception ==
When the Performing Arts Center was completed, architectural critic Justin Davidson described the structure as holding "the spotlight on a highly visible stage, offering spectacle without garishness". Peter Marks of The Washington Post wrote: "The windowless, marble-clad structure sits on the Ground Zero site like a giant sugar cube. Or more aptly, perhaps, like one in a pair of massive stone dice." According to The New York Observer, "The Perelman, in all its grandeur, is more than just a venue—it's a beacon of potential, further amplifying New York's prominence in the global arts scene and standing as Manhattan's fresh fountain of creativity."

The Performing Arts Center has received multiple design awards, including the Society of Registered American Architects New York, Special Award for Innovation in Cultural Architecture, 2022; American Institute of Architects New York, Honor Award in Projects, 2022; The Chicago Athenaeum American Architectural Award, 2021; Architizer A+ Awards, Winner in the Unbuilt Cultural Category, 2019.
