= Dee and Charles Wyly Theatre =

Theatre at the AT&T Performing Arts Center in Dallas, Texas

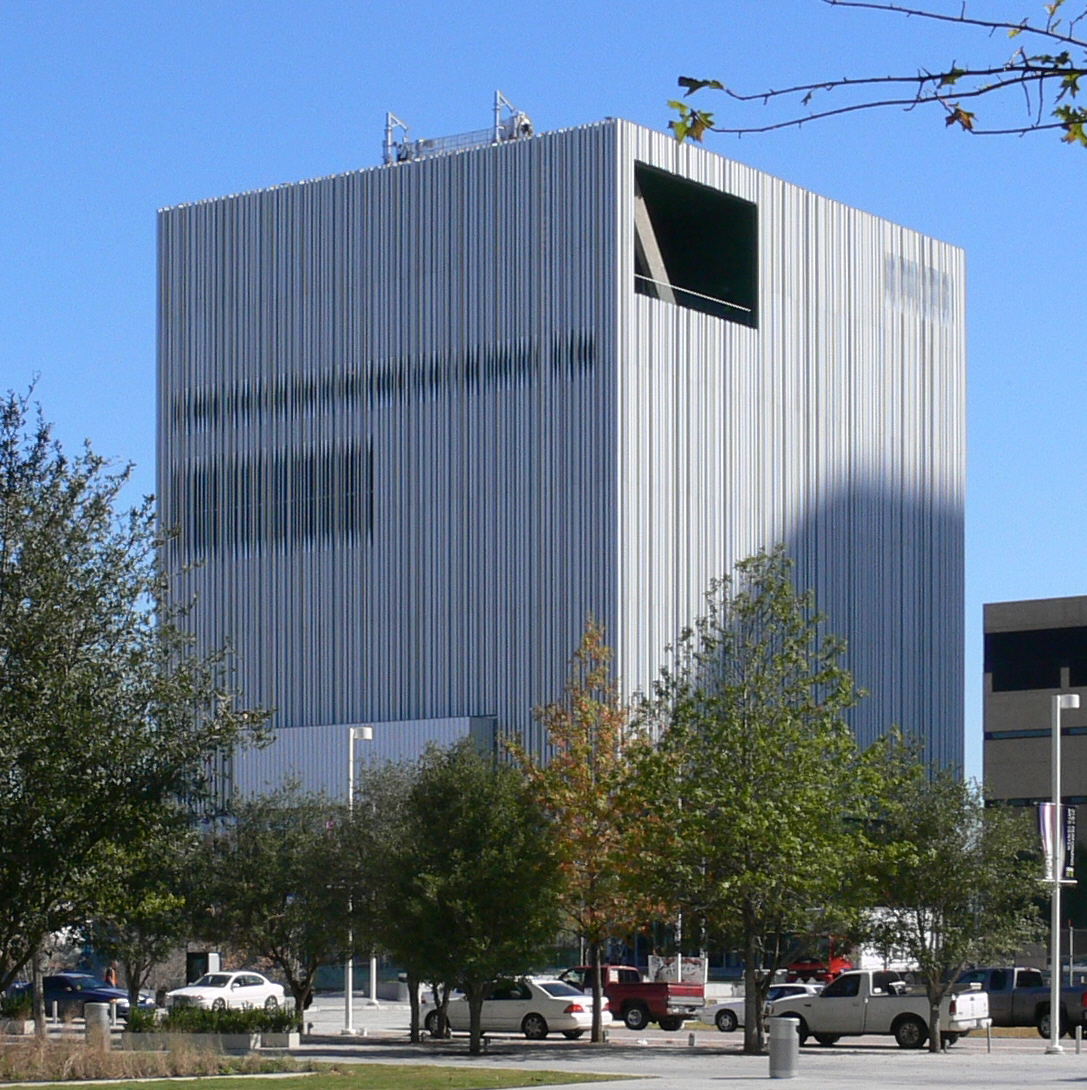
- Interactive map of Dee and Charles Wyly Theatre
- Address: Dallas Arts District; 2403 Flora Street; Dallas; United States
- Coordinates: 32.789946°N 96.796386°W
- Owner: City of Dallas
- Capacity: 600 (est.)
- Type: Theatre
- Public transit: M-Line: Olive & Flora

Construction
- Opened: 2009
- Architects: Joshua Prince-Ramus, Rem Koolhaas

Website
- www.attpac.org

The Dee and Charles Wyly Theatre is a theatre at the AT&T Performing Arts Center, located in the Arts District of downtown Dallas, Texas (USA). It is one of four venues that comprise the AT&T Performing Arts Center and was dedicated October 12, 2009. The 80,300-square-foot building is twelve stories tall and holds about 600 people, depending upon the stage configuration. It is the new venue for the Dallas Theater Center, Dallas Black Dance Theatre and Anita N. Martinez Ballet Folklorico.

The Wyly Theatre was designed by REX | OMA, Joshua Prince-Ramus (partner in charge) and Pritzker Prize winning architect Rem Koolhaas. It features a groundbreaking design with an unprecedented "stacked" vertically organized facility that completely rethinks the traditional form of theatre. It is named for Dee and Charles Wyly, who donated $20 million to the Center.

The vertical rods lining the outside of the building on all four sides are intended to be symbolic of the folds of a theater curtain. The rods comprising the facade are extruded anodized aluminum.

== Gallery ==
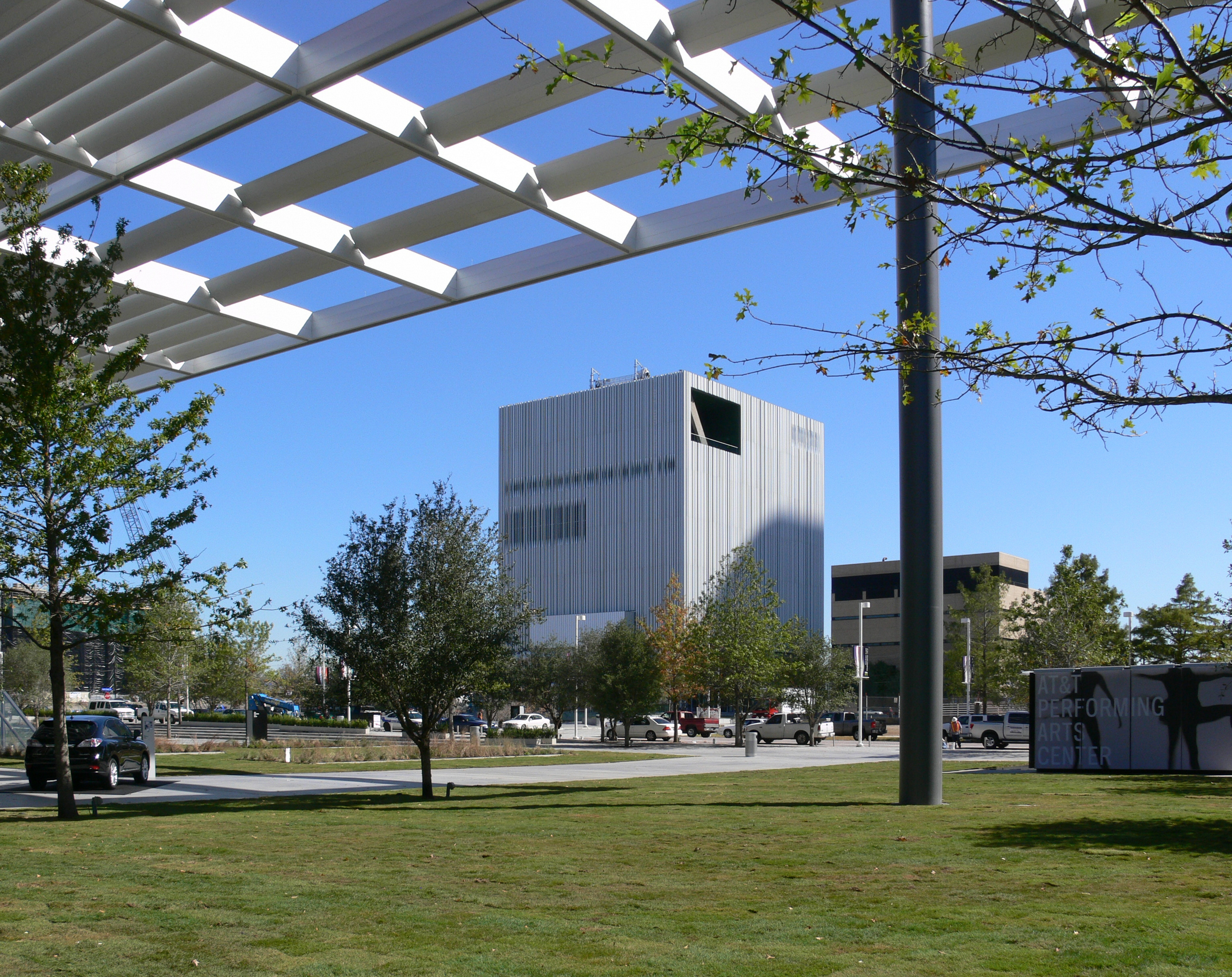

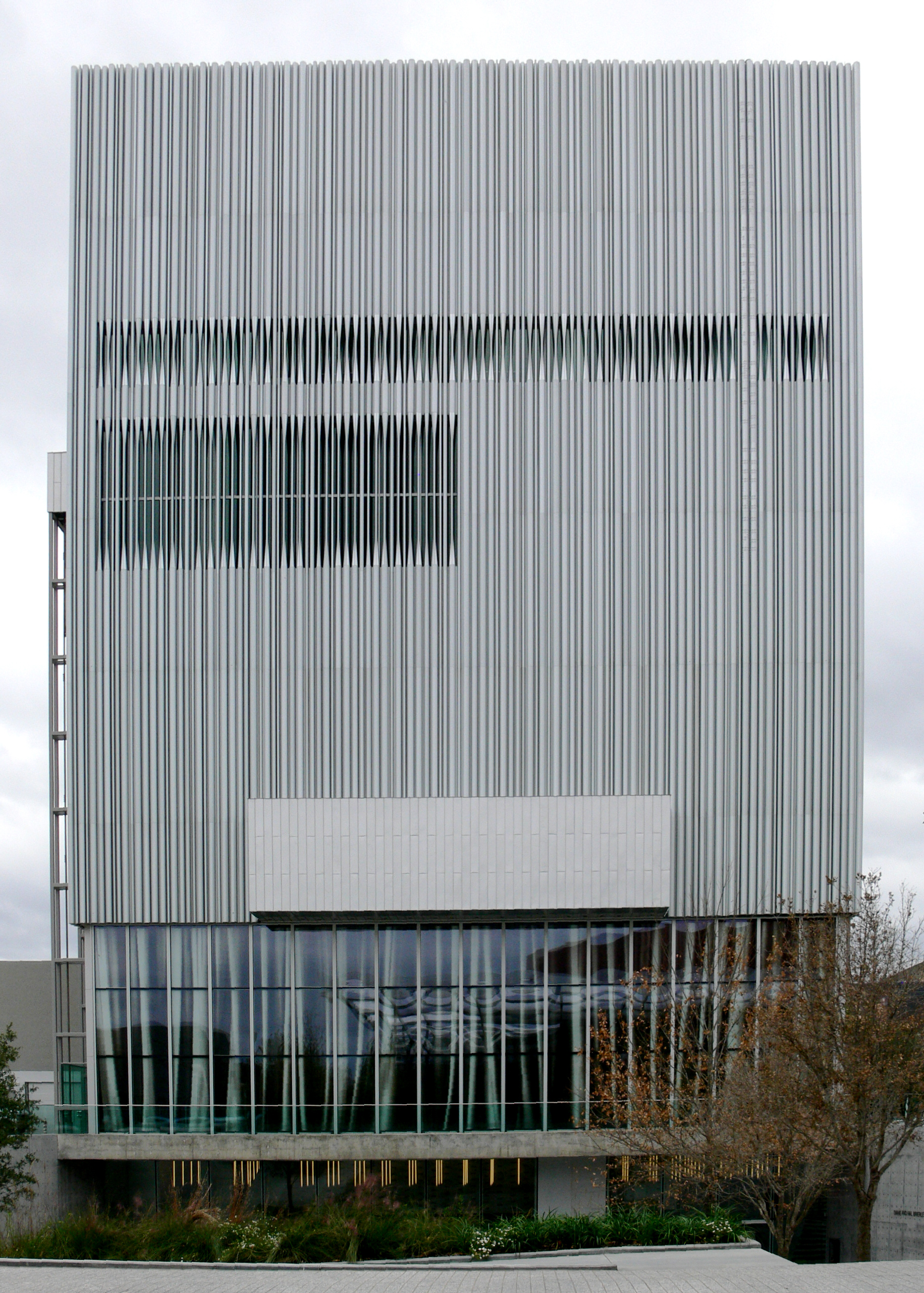

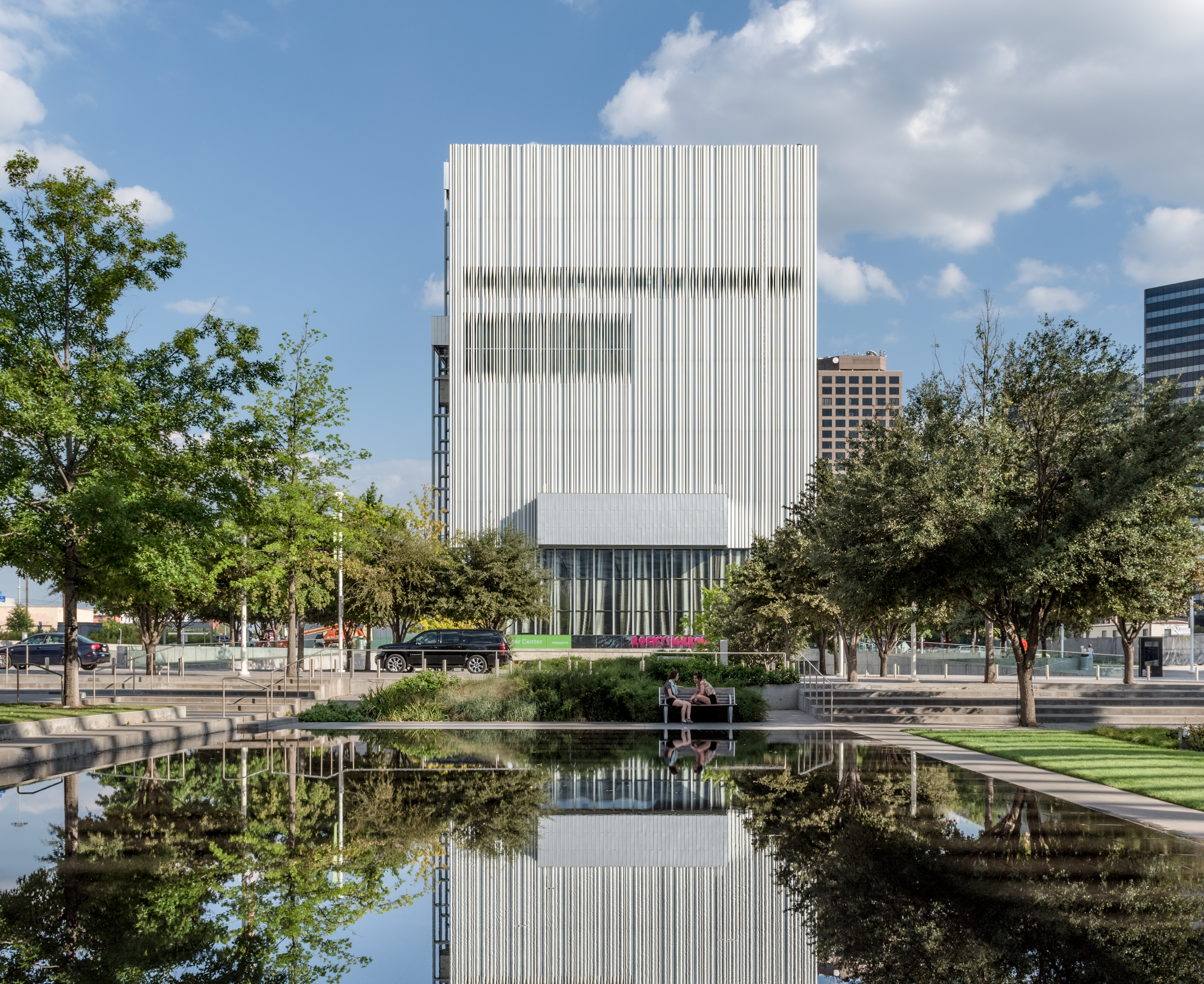
