= Louisville Museum Plaza =

Defunct U.S. skyscraper proposal

Museum Plaza

- Location within Kentucky

General information
- Status: Never built
- Type: Residential, commercial, retail, museum, University of Louisville Master of Fine Arts program, public park
- Location: Intersection of Seventh St. and Washington St., between River Road and Main St.
- Coordinates: 38°15′30″N 85°45′42″W
- Construction started: October 25, 2007

Height
- Roof: 214.2 m (703 ft)

Technical details
- Floor count: 62

Design and construction
- Architect: REX
- Developer: Steve Wilson and Laura Lee Brown, Steve Poe, Craig Greenberg
- Structural engineer: Magnusson Klemencic Associates

Louisville Museum Plaza was a 62-story skyscraper that was planned for Louisville, Kentucky, United States. By August 1, 2011, despite the expenditure of public funds on its behalf, its developers had officially announced that they were abandoning plans to build it. The 703-foot (214 m) tall skyscraper was projected to cost $490 million and contain a 1-acre (0.40 ha) public plaza and park, condominiums, lofts, a hotel, retail shops and a museum. If built, it would have replaced the AEGON Center as the tallest building in Kentucky. The avant-garde design of the skyscraper was chosen by New York City REX architect Joshua Prince-Ramus. A groundbreaking ceremony was held on October 25, 2007, and construction at that time was expected to be complete by 2010. Delays disrupted the project. Prior to announcing that the project had been abandoned, Craig Greenberg, one of the project's four developers, had stated that he was "hopeful that construction will start this year [2010]" and that he also expected the project to be completed by late 2012.

The location of Museum Plaza would have been between River Road, Main Street, 7th Street and 6th Streets in downtown within the West Main district, adjacent to the Muhammad Ali Center.

== History ==
=== Initial offering ===
The Museum Plaza project was first announced on February 9, 2006, as a 62-story three-tower skyscraper. The original intent of the project was to house a "contemporary art museum, restaurants, retail stores, 85 luxury condominiums, 150 lofts, a 300-room hotel, office space and a 1,100-car underground parking garage." The project originally contained approximately 1,200,000 square feet (110,000 m^{2}) of space, nearly twice the size of AEGON Center, 300,000 sq ft (30,000 m^{2}). of which would be reserved for office space. Sales of the lofts, condos and offices began in March.

The $380 million project that featured a fairly radical skyscraper concept would have engulfed the West Main district, also known as "Museum Row" for its diverse collections of exhibitions. $305 million would have been paid for with private money and income from operations, with the remainder coming from the city and state in the way of upgrading adjacent infrastructures which would include moving the adjacent floodwall, redirecting several city streets, and constructing a public park and walkway; plans were for the city and state money to come from rebates on new taxes expected to be generated by Museum Plaza over 20 years.

The location of the proposed skyscraper was chosen for its derelict structures; it was donated by the city to the developers.

At the time of its unveiling, the University of Louisville was negotiating with the developers to move its Master of Fine Arts program into the complex. The primary reason was that there would have been ample gallery space that could be shared between various artists and the university; the public could also have collaborated with the residents, university students, workers or visitors to Museum Plaza.

One of the main concerns was that the design would have been "out-of-context" with the West Main Street district. The surrounding structures are a mix of four- and five-story period structures that would have been "engulfed" by the 62-story tower. Several, including Louisville's mayor, Jerry Abramson, raised concerns that the skyscraper would "separate itself" from the district due to its size and style.

=== Preliminary construction begins ===
Preliminary construction began on November 13, 2006, with the selective demolition of four West Main Street buildings. The facades of 615-621 West Main were to have been saved to serve as an entrance to a "pedestrian promenade and retail corridor." The buildings were abandoned, having been purchased by the Parking Authority of River City in 2001 for a "grand entrance" for the failed 30-story Vencor Tower, which since-abandoned plans had located on the same site as planned for Museum Plaza.

The "retail arcade," as planned, would have extended from West Main Street to a pedestrian overpass over Washington Street, where it would have connected to a plaza and amphitheater. If completed it would have featured 34 trees, a terrace, and connections to Museum Plaza and the Muhammad Ali Center.

The skyscraper's groundbreaking occurred on October 25, 2007.

=== Growing larger ===
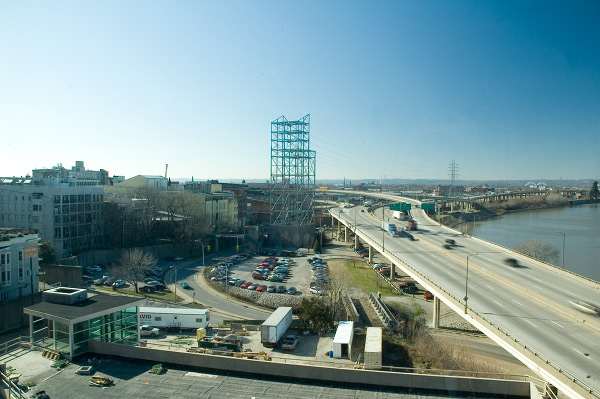
The proposed Museum Plaza location is adjacent to the Muhammad Ali Center in downtown Louisville, Kentucky. The viaduct at right carries Interstate 64. This was the former location of the proposed but never built Vencor Tower

On December 6, 2006, it was announced that Museum Plaza was becoming larger. The $380 million price tag had risen to $465 million due to several additions to the complex, adjacent roadway improvements and rising basic material costs; new alterations to the city's waterfront would entail more work for the city and state. The announcement also stated that the project would contain a 246-room Westin Hotel, the addition of 14 luxury condominiums for a total of 99, a 140,000 sq ft (13,000 m^{2}). park that would connect to the nearby Muhammad Ali Center, and for the demolition of the LG&E tower at Eighth Street. The proposed project grew to contain 1,500,000 sq ft (140,000 m^{2}). of space, a 40,000 sq ft (4,000 m^{2}). contemporary art museum, 20,000 sq ft (2,000 m^{2}). of restaurants and retail space, 99 luxury condominiums, 117 lofts, a 246-room hotel, office space and an 800-car underground parking garage.

In the revisions, the number of lofts was lowered from 150 to 117 because the University of Louisville's Master of Fine Arts program was intending to move to Museum Plaza; this would have given the school additional room. The arts program, covering 36,500 sq ft (3,390 m^{2}). over four levels, was to include a glass-making shop. The hotel also lost 50 rooms in the process, but the addition of a ballroom, fitness center, spa, restaurant and bar would have made up for the difference.

On January 22, 2007, it was announced that the number of lofts would be decreased to 108 and the number of luxury condominiums would be 95, a loss of four. The amount of proposed restaurant and retail space was increased to 40,000 sq ft (4,000 m^{2}). It was also announced that there would be 16 floors with a total of 295,000 sq ft (27,400 m^{2}). dedicated to offices. The total number of floors was also increased to 62.

It was expected that, once construction began in May or June 2007, there would be 561 full-time workers employed at the construction site for three years. The developers claimed that the combined economic impact of the project was planned to be $900 million, which would have made it one of Kentucky's largest economic development projects.

==== Details ====
The fourth level was slated to be a public plaza. Located on multiple floors would have been an art showcase titled the "Island"; if built, the five galleries within the "Island" would have featured frequently changing contemporary exhibits. Two of the galleries were to be dedicated to the University of Louisville, one specifically for their glass-arts study. Offices would have been located around the "Island" and surrounding that would have been a lobby, spas, stores and other support facilities.

The public plaza outside of the Museum Plaza was planned to feature a playground, flora and water features, and a playing field. The Fort Nelson Park would have served as a "parkway" to this plaza.

=== Financial issues ===
The city of Louisville's Convention and Visitors Bureau, and numerous groups representing the hotel and tourism industries, opposed the legislation that would have allocated portions of the room tax for the proposed Westin Hotel at Museum Plaza to the developers. A resolution by the groups was passed in late-January 2007. The money would have reimbursed Museum Plaza officials for construction costs regarding a new floodwall and the River Road extension, among other public work improvements.

The developers claimed that the $465 million development could not be built without the tax changes and two other measures that were introduced in the Kentucky General Assembly. The other measures included requesting changes in state law that would allow them to extend the tax increment financing from 20 to 30 years, and to remove sales tax from all construction materials.

On February 1, 2007, Mayor Jerry Abramson intervened, urging the Museum Plaza developers and opponents of the room tax to reach agreement "within 48 hours".

One day later, agreement was reached between the Convention and Visitors Bureau, hotel and tourism industries and Museum Plaza officials regarding the tax proposal. According to the deal, the amount of tax revenue spent on public infrastructure would have been limited to a maximum of $400,000 per year, to increase by four percent per year over thirty years. Any revenue generated above the upper limit would have gone to the Convention and Visitors Bureau.

=== Museum Plaza is approved ===
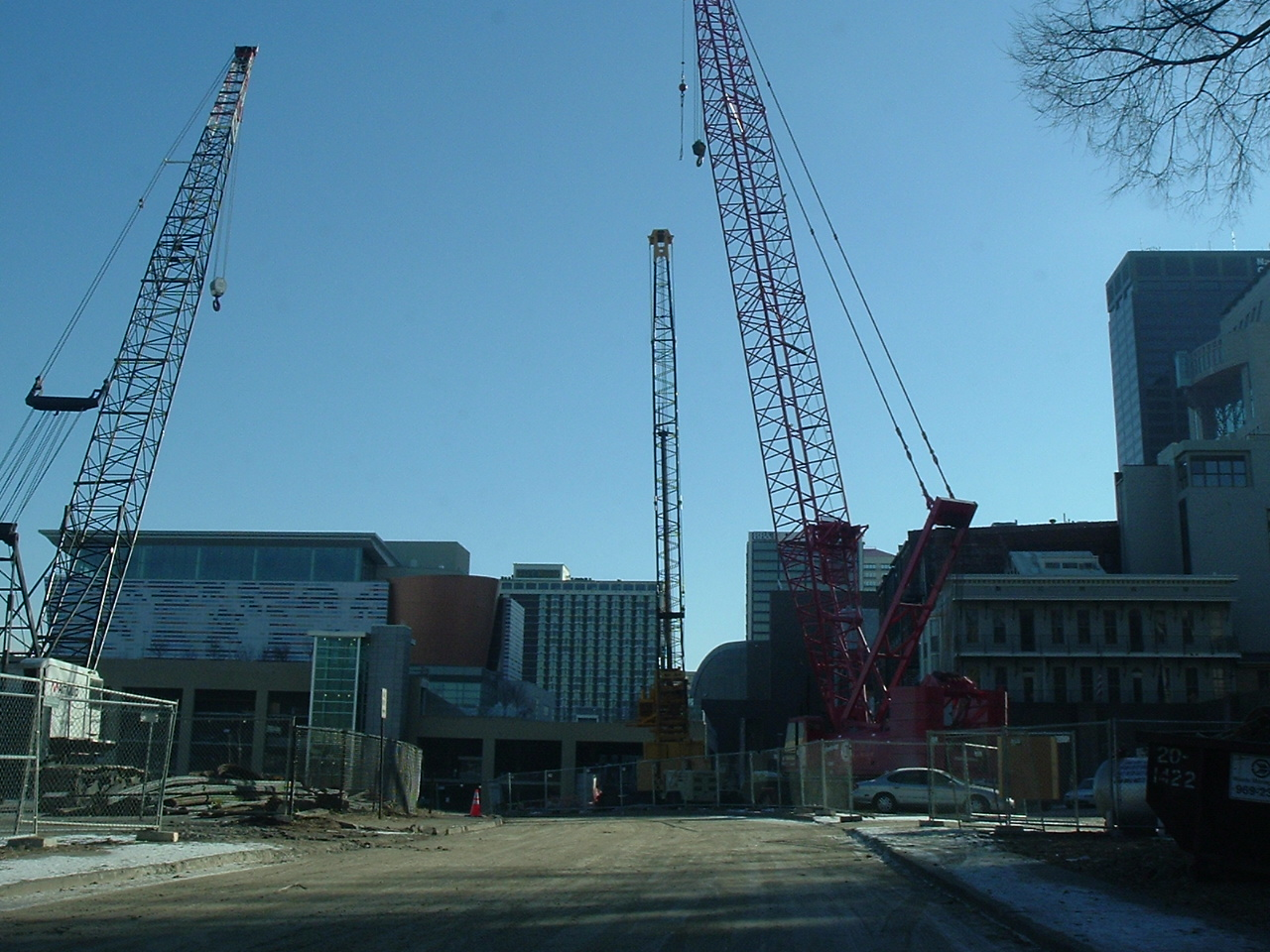
Ongoing construction on Museum Plaza on January 22, 2008

On March 2, 2007, House Bill 549 passed by a 79–13 vote that allowed the state to provide funding for one fourth, or $130 million, of the Museum Plaza project. It then cleared the Senate on March 12 by a 35–1 margin, and the House approved the Senate changes 85–11.

On April 20 it was announced that the groundbreaking for Museum Plaza' construction would be September 27. The finalized list of features included:

- 98 luxury condos
- 117 studio loft condos,
- 270,400 sq ft (25,120 m^{2}). of offices on 13 floors,
- 250-room Westin Hotel that has a ballroom, fitness center, spa, restaurant and bar/lounge,
- 140,000 sq ft (13,000 m^{2}). public plaza,
- 20,000 sq ft (2,000 m^{2}). of restaurants and shops,
- 36,500 sq ft (3,390 m^{2}). of studios for the University of Louisville fine-arts program, a glass shop, and fine arts gallery,
- 40,000 sq ft (4,000 m^{2}). of contemporary art space,
- 800-space parking garage.

A "string of shops" would have been constructed behind the three facades that were saved at 615-621 W. Main Street, providing an entryway over the floodwall into Museum Plaza.

On May 23, 2007, the Downtown Development Review Overlay board, which oversees the design of downtown projects, stated that Museum Plaza met most of its guidelines for new construction. It suggested a few improvements for the project, including:

- A way to connect a public plaza to the Ohio River, similar to how the Belvedere reaches the wharf at Fourth Street and River Road.
- Encourage public art on the site.
- Submit plans for signage, landscaping, exterior lighting and details on the four-story parking structure that will serve as the base of Museum Plaza.

The city landmarks committee also recommended that an obelisk at Fort Nelson Park (Seventh and Main streets) remain at its current location. Museum Plaza officials wanted to remove it to build a parkway that would lead to the public plaza. The obelisk marks certain distances to Fort Nelson, the second fort built in Kentucky.

=== Groundbreaking ceremony ===
On October 25, 2007, an official groundbreaking ceremony was held on the site to kick off actual construction.

=== Subsequent problems ===
Construction on the building halted in January 2008. The developers cited as the cause vibrations from digging tools at the site that shook nearby 19th century Main Street structures. At the time, the building's developers still projected that the building would be completed in 2011.

In March 2008 construction was halted due to financial problems and engineering problems related to the bedrock on the site. Construction preparation resumed in June 2008 with the relocation of underground utilities.

By January 23, 2009, two contractors on the project had filed liens against the project, for $2.3 million and $1.4 million. The lienholders stated that they had not been paid for work previously done on the project.

=== On hold in 2010 ===
In February 2010 Mayor Abramson forecasted that financing would be resolved in 2010 with construction starting up again in 2011. In an article Abramson implied that part of the funds might come from federal stimulus funds. In another article from February, 2010, Craig Greenberg, one of four Museum Plaza developers expressed his hopes that construction would restart in 2010. Greenberg referred to a 30-month project completion time and predicted a 2012 opening based upon a 2010 resumption of construction. However, there were no concrete details of progress in either of these news reports.

A news conference was held at the site, on June 25, and an announcement was made that a $100 million HUD loan application was to be filed, in July. The primary developer, Laura Lee Brown, was to use her personal guarantee as the collateral.

=== Plans abandoned ===
By August 1, 2011, after a long period of inactivity on the project and despite public expenditures on its behalf, the project developers had officially announced that they were abandoning plans to build Museum Plaza.

== See also ==
- City of Parks
- List of attractions and events in the Louisville metropolitan area
- KFC Yum! Center
- List of tallest buildings in Louisville
