= Memory Foundations =

Proposed World Trade Center site plan

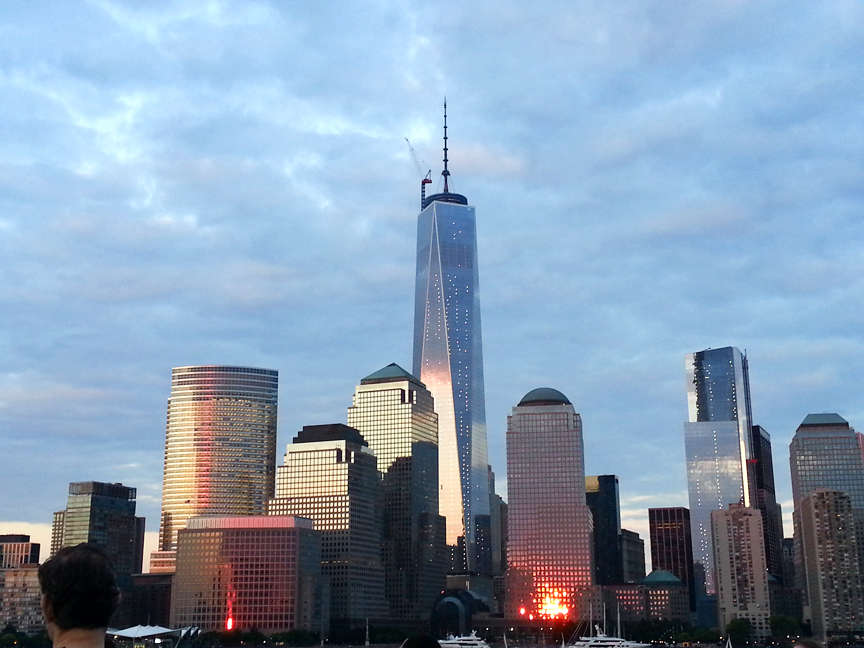
Final design

Memory Foundations is Daniel Libeskind's site plan for the World Trade Center, which was originally selected by the Lower Manhattan Development Corporation (LMDC) to be the master plan for rebuilding at the World Trade Center site in New York City in February 2003.

Memory Foundations placed a large memorial to the victims of the September 11, 2001, attacks at the center of the World Trade Center. Surrounding the memorial was to be five large office buildings arranged in an ascending spiral upward from the southeast of the site. The spiral would culminate in the complex's tallest building, the One World Trade Center, a 1,776-foot (541 m) spire. Also included would be the World Trade Center Transportation Hub; the National September 11 Museum; a Performing Arts Center designed by Frank Gehry; and various parks and public spaces.

The actual design (the one which is constructed) involves a different design and arrangement of buildings. The original plan aimed to fully replace the 10,000,000 square feet (930,000 m^{2}) of office space lost on September 11, 2001, to memorialize the victims of the attacks, and to revive New York City's economy and skyline.

== See also ==
- World Trade Center (1973–2001)
- World Trade Center site
