= Joshua Ramus =

American architect

- Born: August 11, 1969 (age 57); United States
- Education: Yale University, Harvard University
- Occupation: Architect
- Children: 1
- Practice: REX, Office for Metropolitan Architecture (OMA)
- Buildings: Perelman Performing Arts Center at the World Trade Center, Lindemann Performing Arts Center at Brown University, AT&T Performing Arts Center Dee and Charles Wyly Theatre, Vakko Fashion Center & Power Media Headquarters, Seattle Central Library, Guggenheim-Hermitage Museum
- Website: www.rex-ny.com

Joshua Ramus (born August 11, 1969) is an American architect, educator, and founding principal of REX, an architecture and design firm based in New York City.

Ramus has designed renowned buildings including the Perelman Performing Arts Center at the World Trade Center in New York, New York; The Lindemann Performing Arts Center at Brown University in Providence, Rhode Island; the AT&T Performing Arts Center Dee & Charles Wyly Theatre in Dallas, Texas; the Vakko Fashion Center & Power Media Headquarters in Istanbul, Turkey; the Seattle Central Library in Washington state; and the Guggenheim-Hermitage Museum in Las Vegas, Nevada.

== Early life and education ==
Born in New Haven, Connecticut, Ramus was raised between Bainbridge Island, Washington, and Beaufort, North Carolina.

Ramus holds a Bachelor of Arts in Philosophy from Yale University (1991) and a Master of Architecture from Harvard University (1996), where he earned the inaugural Araldo Cossutta Fellowship and the SOM Fellowship. Ramus rowed at Yale, was a member of the 1994 U.S. Pre-Elite Team, won a gold medal at the 1994 U.S. Olympic Festival, and competed in the 1996 U.S. Olympic Trials.

== Career ==
Ramus joined the Office for Metropolitan Architecture (OMA) in Rotterdam, Netherlands, in 1996. In 2001, he became a partner at OMA and moved to Manhattan to co-found OMA New York with Rem Koolhaas. In 2006, Ramus purchased Koolhaas's half of OMA New York and rebranded the firm as REX.

Ramus's recently completed work includes 2050 M Street, a premium office building that hosts CBS's Washington, DC bureau as well as 205 North Quay and 9 The Esplanade, office towers in Brisbane and Perth, Australia, respectively. His projects under design or construction include 15 The Esplanade, a mixed-use skyscraper in Perth, Australia; Domino Site B, two 50-story residential towers on the Brooklyn, New York waterfront, as part of the redevelopment of the Domino Sugar Factory site; a hybrid retail and cultural hub for Kia Motors in Seoul, South Korea; and the 4,050 m^{2} (43,600 SF) Necklace Residence on Long Island, New York.

Ramus is the John Portman Visiting Critic in Architecture at the Harvard Graduate School of Design and an AIA New York TORCH Mentor. He has been the Eero Saarinen Visiting Professor at Yale University, the Cullinan Visiting Professor at Rice University, and a visiting professor at Columbia University, The Cooper Union, Massachusetts Institute of Technology, and Syracuse University. An early member of the TED Brain Trust, Ramus shared REX's design methodologies at TED2006 and TEDxSMU.

== Recognition ==
Ramus is a Fellow of the American Institute of Architects in the first category, "granted to architects who have produced an extensive body of distinguished work that has been broadly recognized for its design excellence." In 2015, Ramus became the first American recipient of the $100,000 Marcus Prize, a biennial international architecture award conferred by the Marcus Corporation Foundation and the University of Wisconsin.

Ramus's projects have been recognized with two American Institute of Architecture (AIA) National Honor Awards, a U.S. Institute for Theatre Technology National Honor Award, an American Library Association National Building Award, Time magazine’s Building of the Year, the International Design Awards (IDA) Building of the Year, two American Council of Engineering Companies' National Gold Awards, a Council on Tall Buildings and Urban Habitat Award of Excellence, three Mies Crown Hall Americas Prize Outstanding Project Awards, and numerous state AIA, Society of American Registered Architects (SARA), ArchDaily, Architect/Progressive Architecture, Architect's Newspaper, Architectural Review/MIPIM, Architizer, and Wallpaper* design awards.

== Personal life ==
Ramus married a Dutch citizen in 2004, after which the couple hyphenated their surnames as "Prince-Ramus." Ramus reverted to his original name after their divorce. Ramus has one child, whom he raised in Tribeca, New York.

== Notable work ==
- Guggenheim-Hermitage Museum & Guggenheim Las Vegas Museum (2001) Las Vegas, Nevada
- 9/11 Response: Don't Rebuild. Reimagine. (2002) New York, New York
- Seattle Central Library (2004), Seattle, Washington
- Caltech Annenberg Center for Information Science & Technology (2006), Pasadena, California
- Governors Island (2007), New York, New York
- Museum Plaza (2007), Louisville, Kentucky
- Forward Residence (2008), New York, New York
- Kunsthaus Zürich Extension (2008), Zurich, Switzerland
- Munch Museum & Stenersen Museum Collections (2008), Oslo, Norway
- Madison Avenue (Doll)House (2008), New York, New York
- Vestbane (2008), Oslo, Norway
- Yongsan Experiment (2008), Seoul, South Korea
- AT&T Performing Arts Center Dee & Charles Wyly Theatre (2009), Dallas, Texas
- Low2No Sustainable Development (2009), Helsinki, Finland
- Vakko Fashion Center & Power Media Headquarters (2010), Istanbul, Turkey
- Songdo Landmark City Block A4 (2010) Incheon, South Korea
- Victoria & Albert Museum at Dundee (2010), Dundee, Scotland
- CLC & MSFL Towers (2011), Shenzhen, China
- World Financial Center Winter Garden (2011), New York, New York
- Equator Tower (2012), Kuala Lumpur, Malaysia
- Mercedes-Benz Future Lab & Campus Extension (2012), Stuttgart, Germany
- McDonald's Future Restaurant Platform (2012)
- Yongsan International Business District "Project R6" (2012) Seoul, South Korea
- Activision|Blizzard Headquarters (2013), Santa Monica, California
- Calgary New Central Library (2013), Calgary, Canada
- Surya (2013), Dallas, Texas
- Calvin Klein Voyeur House Singapore (2014), Kallang Airport, Singapore
- Al Jazeera Headquarters Buildings (2015), Doha, Qatar
- Wakefield School Performing Arts Center (2015), The Plains, Virginia
- Canti-Lever House (& Astroid House) (2016), New York, New York
- Farley Annex High Garden (2016), New York, New York
- The Museum of the 20th Century (2016), Berlin, Germany
- Five Manhattan West (2017), New York, New York
- IIᴑᴑ (2017) New York, New York
- Shenzhen Opera House (2020), Shenzhen, China
- CDMX Mash-Up (2018), Mexico City, Mexico
- 2050 M Street (2020), Washington, District of Columbia
- Komische Oper Berlin Expansion (2020), Berlin, Germany
- 15 The Esplanade (2021), Perth, Australia
- The Lindemann Performing Arts Center at Brown University (2023), Providence, Rhode Island
- Perelman Performing Arts Center at the World Trade Center (2023), New York, New York
- 205 North Quay Tower (2025), Brisbane, Australia
- 9 The Esplanade (2025), Perth, Australia
- The Necklace Residence (2025) Long Island, New York
