= Seattle Central Library =

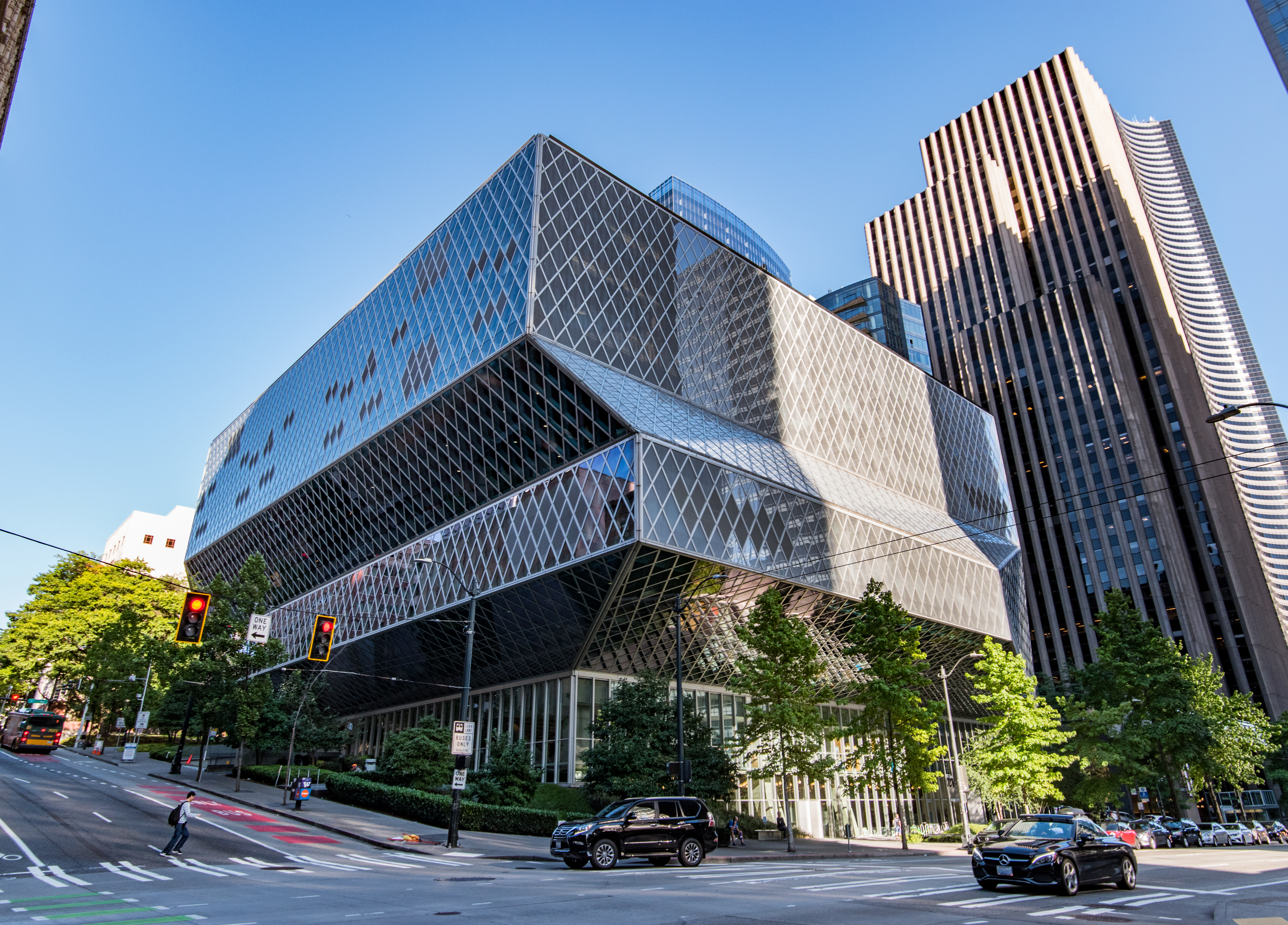
- Seattle Central Library in 2019

- Location within Downtown Seattle

General information
- Type: Public Library
- Location: 1000 Fourth Avenue; Seattle, Washington; 98104
- Coordinates: 47°36′24″N 122°19′57″W
- Construction started: 2002; 24 years ago
- Completed: 2004; 22 years ago
- Opening: May 23, 2004
- Cost: $165.9 million
- Owner: Seattle Public Library

Height
- Architectural: 196 ft (60 m)
- Roof: 185.01 ft (56.39 m)

Technical details
- Floor count: 11
- Floor area: 362,987 sq ft (33,700 m^{2})

Design and construction
- Architect: LMN Architects/Office for Metropolitan Architecture
- Developer: Seattle Public Library
- Structural engineer: Magnusson Klemencic Associates with Arup Group Limited
- Main contractor: Hoffman Construction Company

The Seattle Central Library is the flagship library of the Seattle Public Library system. The 11-story (185 feet or 56.9 meters high) glass and steel building in the downtown core of Seattle, Washington was opened to the public on May 23, 2004. Rem Koolhaas and Joshua Prince-Ramus of OMA/LMN were the principal architects, and Magnusson Klemencic Associates was the structural engineer with Arup. Arup also provided mechanical, electrical, and plumbing engineering, as well as fire/life safety, security, IT and communications, and audio visual consulting. Hoffman Construction Company of Portland, Oregon, was the general contractor.

The 362,987 square feet (33,722.6 m^{2}) public library has the capacity to hold about one and a half million books and other materials. It offers underground public parking for 143 vehicles and over 400 computers accessible to the public. Over two million people visited the library during its first year. It is the third Seattle Central Library building to be located on the same site at 1000 Fourth Avenue, the block bounded by Fourth and Fifth Avenues and Madison and Spring Streets. The library has a unique, striking appearance, consisting of several discrete "floating platforms" seemingly wrapped in a large steel net around glass skin. Architectural tours of the building began in June 2004.

In 2007, the building was voted #108 on the American Institute of Architects' list of Americans' 150 favorite structures in the U.S. It was one of two places in Seattle to be included on the list of 150 structures, the other being T-Mobile Park.

== History ==
There has been a library located in downtown Seattle as far back as 1891; however, the library did not have its own dedicated facilities and it was frequently on the move from building to building. The Seattle Carnegie Library, the first permanent library located in its own dedicated building at Fourth Avenue and Madison Street, opened on December 19, 1906, with a Beaux-Arts design by Peter J. Weber. Andrew Carnegie, whose patronage of libraries later included five others in Seattle, donated $200,000 for the construction of the new library. That library, at 55,000 square feet (5,100 m^{2}), with an extension built in 1946, eventually became too small and cramped for the city's growing population by the 1950s; it had also sustained structural damage from the 1949 Olympia earthquake. A temporary library was set up in the Electric Building on the corner of Seventh Avenue and Olive Way; originally built in 1909, the building was owned by Puget Sound Power and Light until December 1956, when the company sold the building to Frederick & Nelson and moved its offices to the Puget Power Building in Bellevue. The Carnegie library closed on March 22, 1957, with demolition commencing that July.

A second library, at five stories and 206,000 square feet (19,100 m^{2}), was built at the site of the old Carnegie library and opened on March 26, 1960. The new building designed by architects Bindon and Wright, with Decker, Christenson, and Kitchin as associates, featured an international-style architecture and an expanded interior, with features such as drive-thru service to offset the lack of available parking. George Tsutakawa's "Fountain of Wisdom" on the Fifth Avenue side (relocated to Fourth Avenue in the current library) was the first of that artist's many sculptural fountains. A remodeling finished in 1972 gave the public access to the fourth story, dedicated to the arts and sound recordings. By the late 1990s, the library became too cramped again and two-thirds of its materials were held in storage areas inaccessible to patrons. Renewed consciousness of regional earthquake dangers drew concern from public officials about the seismic risks inherent to the building's design.

To make way for the current Seattle Central Library, which is the third library building to inhabit the city block between Fourth and Fifth Avenues, the second library was closed on June 8, 2001, and demolished that November; a temporary library had opened on July 7 in rented spaced at the Washington State Convention and Trade Center. Funding for the new Seattle Central Library building, as well as other construction projects throughout the library system, was provided by a $196.4 million bond measure, called "Libraries for All," approved by Seattle voters on November 3, 1998. The project also received a $20 million donation from Bill Gates, of Microsoft.

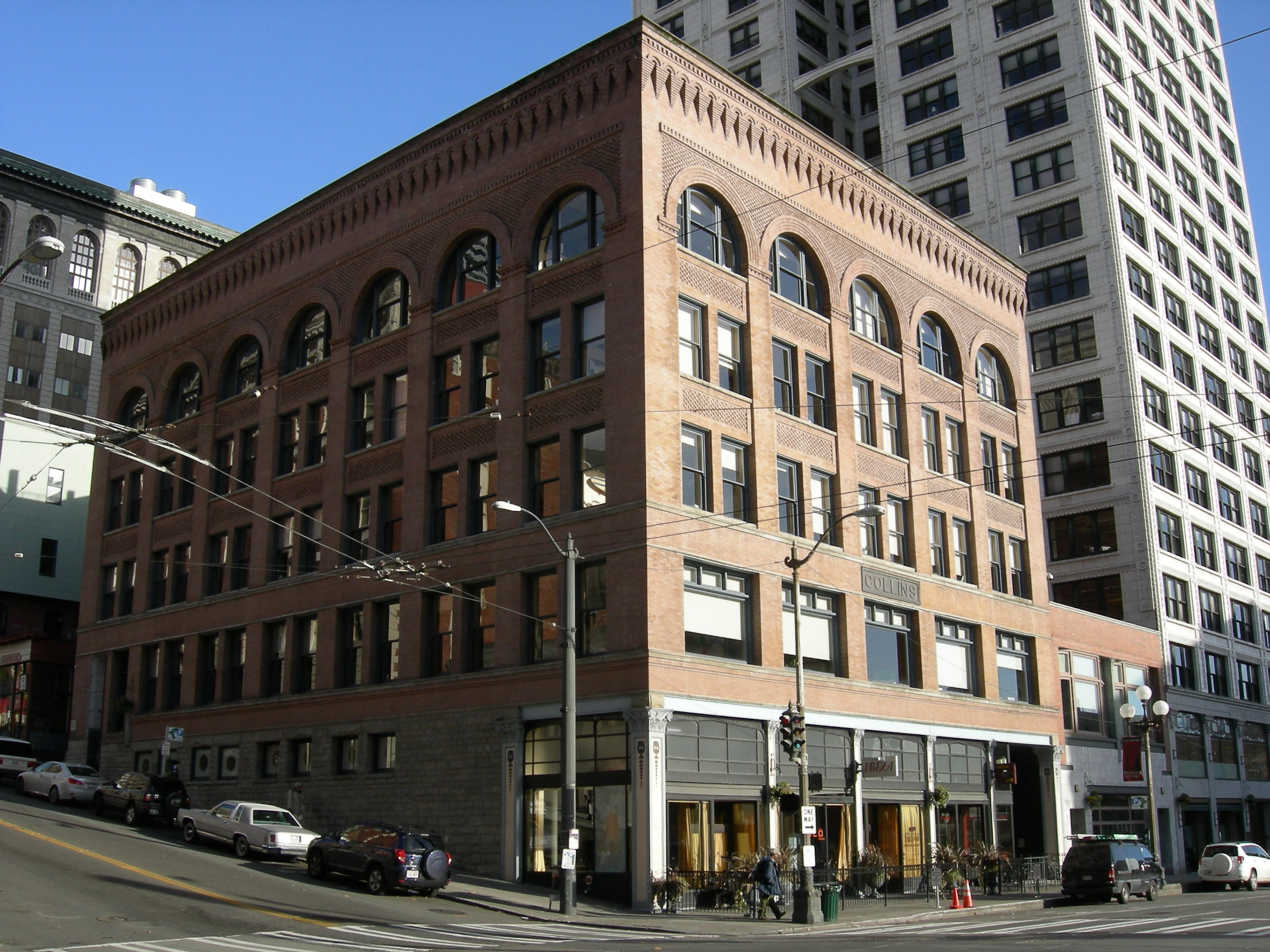
The Collins Block at Second and James; the public library was one of its original 1894 tenants.

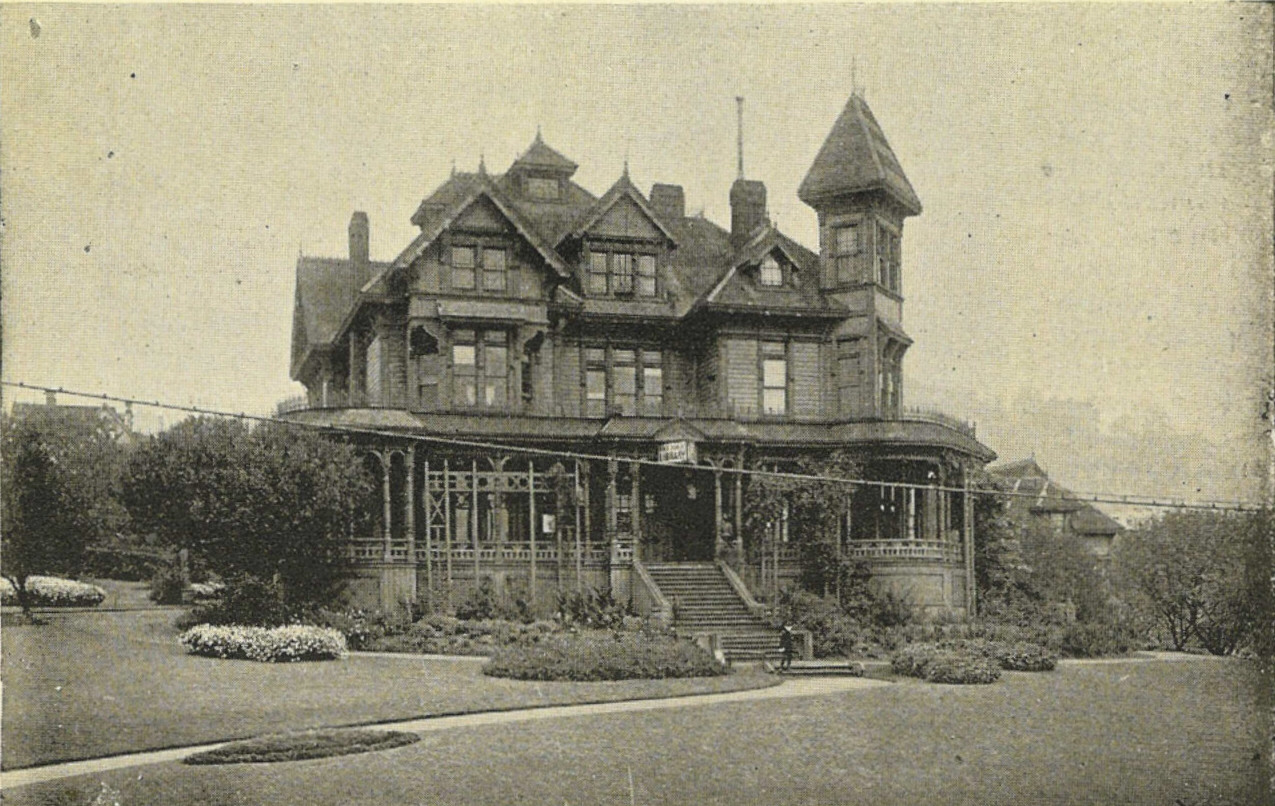
Henry Yesler's former mansion at Third and James was supposed to be a permanent home for the library, but burned January 2, 1901.

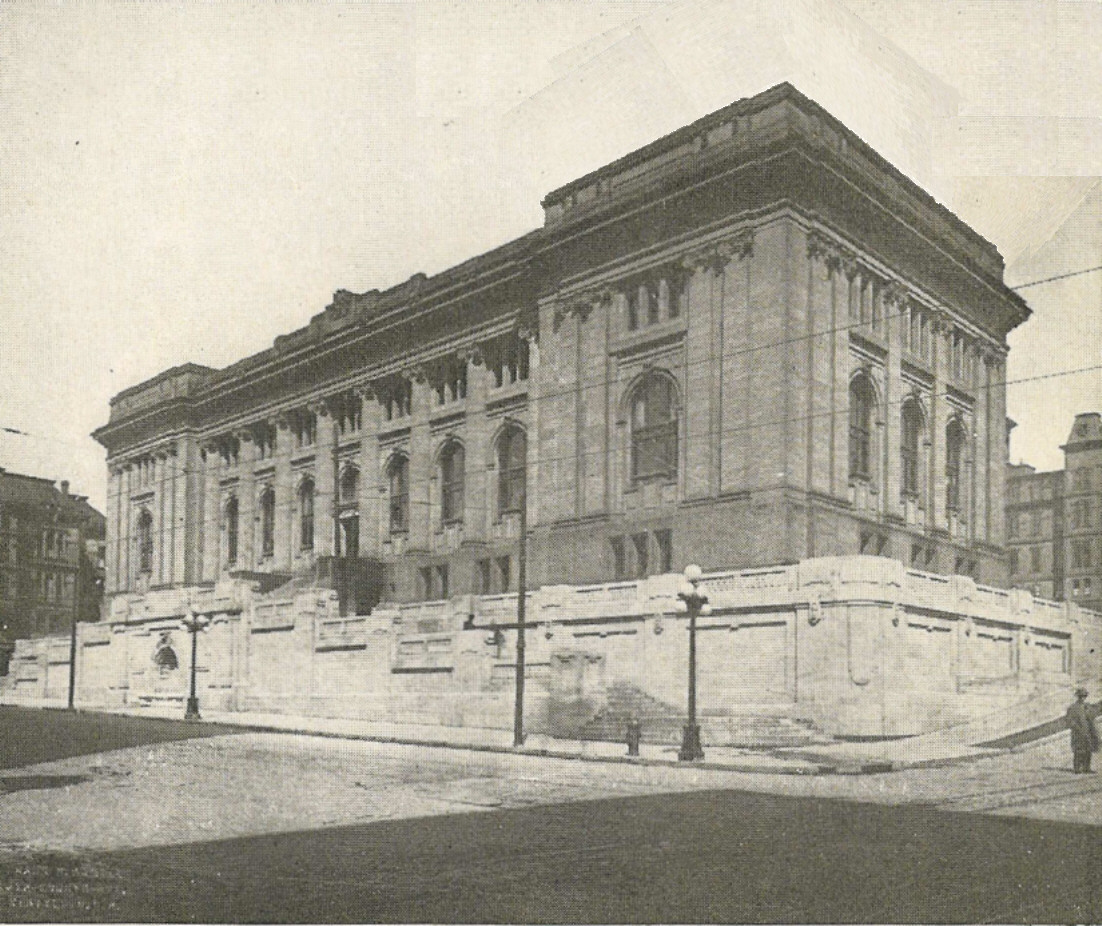
The Carnegie Library, on the same site as the current building, was Seattle's downtown library for just over a half-century.

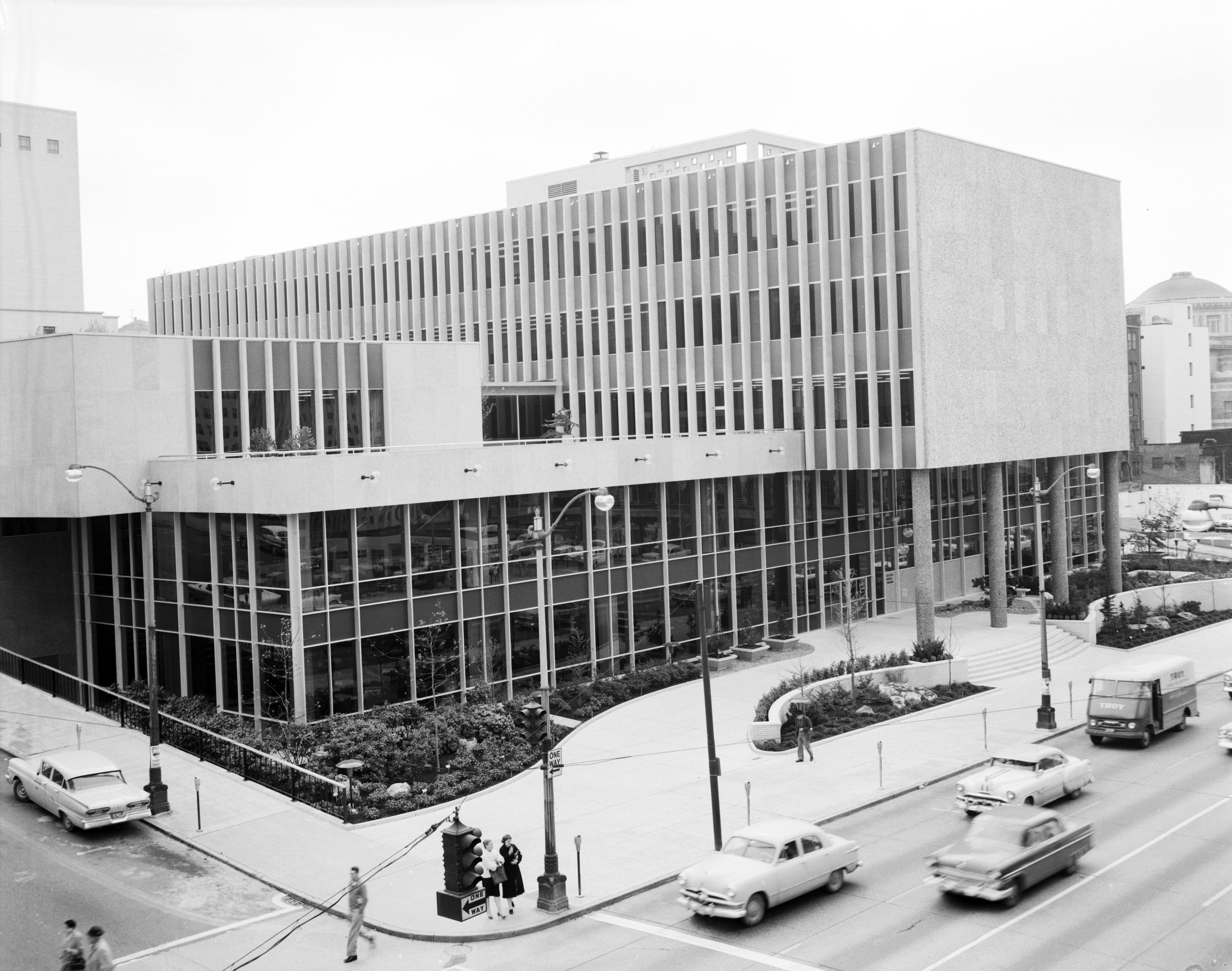
The Bindon and Wright library, which replaced the Carnegie Library on the same site, stood for over 41 years.

== Design ==
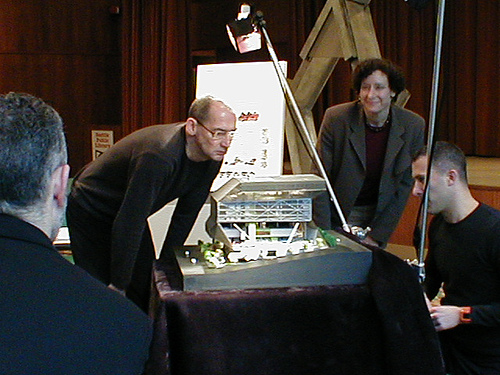
Architect Rem Koolhaas inspecting a model of the building. Joshua Prince-Ramus is kneeling.

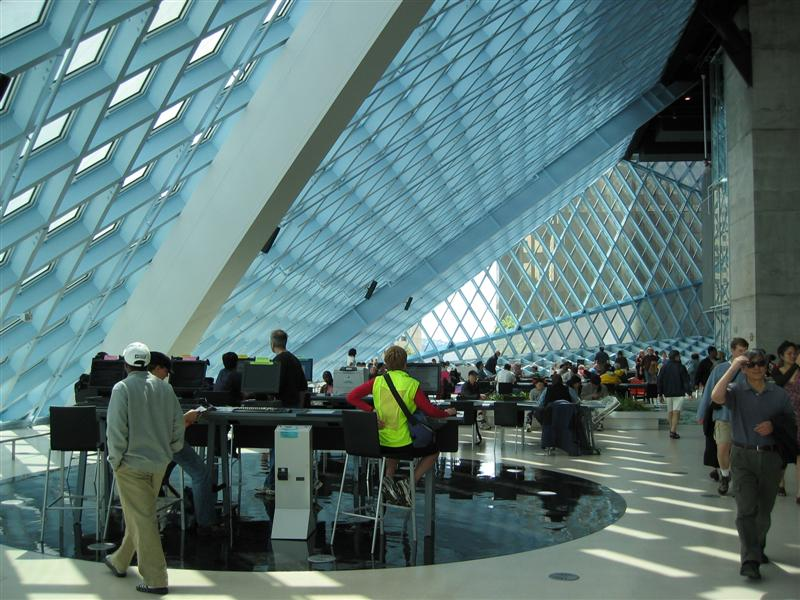
Seattle Central Library interior

Rem Koolhaas and Joshua Prince-Ramus of the Dutch firm Office for Metropolitan Architecture (OMA), working in conjunction with the Seattle firm LMN Architects, served as the building's principal architects. Ramus served as the partner in charge. Bjarke Ingels designed the interior boxes for OMA. OMA was not one of the firms invited to compete for the project. Ramus, formerly a Seattle resident, found out from his mother one day in advance that the library board was inviting interested firms to attend a mandatory public meeting. He flew in, and OMA ended up winning the project.

Deborah Jacobs, Chief Librarian in the Seattle Public Library system, spearheaded the project from the library's perspective and served as the primary client voice, while Betty Jane Narver served as president of the Library Board. The architects conceived the new Central Library building as a celebration of books, deciding after some research that despite the arrival of the 21st century and the "digital age," people still respond to books printed on paper. The 11-story Central Library has a capacity for over 1.5 million books, in comparison to only 900,000 in the old library building. The building has nearly 10,000 windows of custom sizes that were produced in Italy and are estimated to cost $300 million total to replace. The replacement process for some windows requires a closure of nearby streets for measurement and installation.

The architects also worked to make the library inviting to the public, rather than stuffy, which they discovered was the popular perception of libraries as a whole. Although the library is an unusual shape from the outside, the architects' philosophy was to let the building's required functions dictate what it should look like, rather than imposing a structure and making the functions conform to that. The building was later modified by library staff to accommodate public and logistical needs, such as a bathroom near the 5th Avenue entrance and floors able to support lifts for replacing lighting fixtures.

=== Layout ===
The first level, facing 4th Avenue, has a lobby, holds pick-up, and a children's center. It also includes the Microsoft Auditorium, which seats 275 people for events. An escalator connects the 4th Avenue lobby to the third level, which faces 5th Avenue and is named the Norcliffe Foundation Living Room. It includes a small cafe, a gift shop, and a teen center. The fourth level, named the "Red Floor", uses 13 shades of red paint on surfaces and includes four meeting rooms and two computer labs. The main computer lab is located on the fifth level, named the Charles Simonyi Mixing Chamber, with 338 computer stations and a reference desk.

A major section of the building is the "Books Spiral", which is designed to display the library's nonfiction collection without breaking up the Dewey Decimal System classification onto different floors or sections. The collection occupies the sixth, seventh, eighth, and ninth stories on a continuous series of shelves with a maximum slope of 2 degrees. The eighth level also includes music practice rooms, while the ninth level has a genealogy collection and map room. The tenth level is divided between the Seattle Room, which contains local history collections, and the Betty Jane Narver Reading Room with 400 seats. It also includes the highest viewpoints in the building.

New functions include automatic book sorting and conveyance, self-checkout for patrons, pervasive wireless communications among the library staff, and over 400 public computer terminals.

Below the library is a 143-stall parking garage that is open for use by library patrons and other members of the public for a fee.

== Response ==
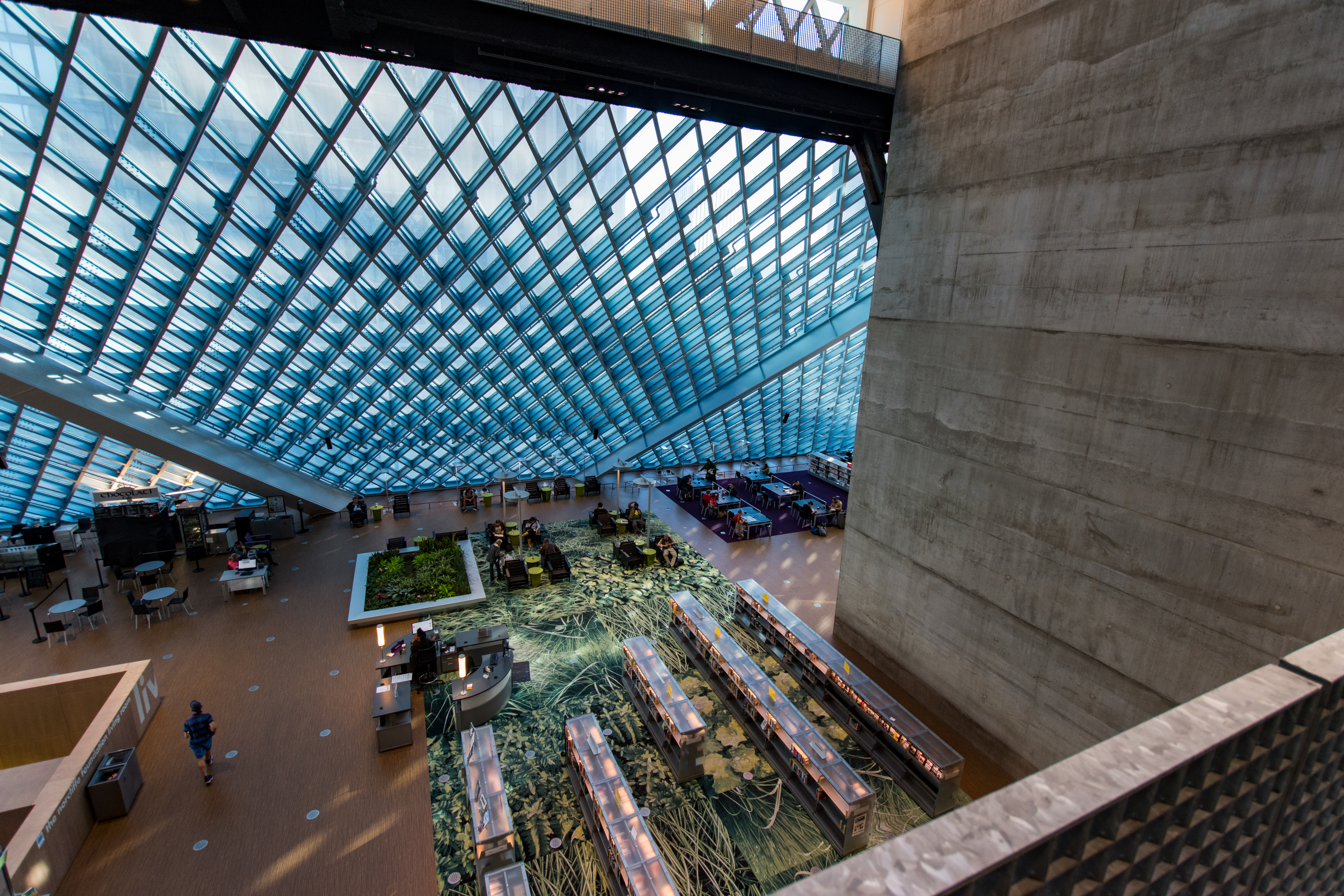
An overhead view of one floor of the library

Use of the building is more than double the predicted volume. In the library's first year, 2.3 million people came to visit the library; roughly 30% were from outside Seattle. The library generated $16 million in new economic activity for its surrounding area in its first year. The opinion of architectural critics and the general public has been mixed. Paul Goldberger, writing in The New Yorker, declared the Seattle Central Library "the most important new library to be built in a generation, and the most exhilarating." The American Council of Engineering Companies (ACEC) of Washington awarded the Library its Platinum Award for innovation and engineering in its "structural solutions". The library also received a 2005 national AIA Honor Award for Architecture.

Lawrence Cheek, the architecture critic for the Seattle Post-Intelligencer, revisited the building in 2007 and found it "confusing, impersonal, uncomfortable, oppressive" on the whole, with various features "decidedly unpleasant," "relentlessly monotonous," "badly designed and cheesily detailed," "profoundly dreary and depressing," and "cheaply finished or dysfunctional," concluding that his earlier praise for the building was a "mistake."

The library was roundly condemned by the Project for Public Spaces, which noted "if the library were a true 'community hub,' its most active areas would connect directly to the street, spinning off activity in every direction. That is where Koolhaas's library, sealed away from the sidewalks and streets around it, fails completely." It went on to note "critics have cast it as a masterpiece of public space design. As if blinded by the architect's knack for flash and publicity, they cannot locate, or perhaps refuse to acknowledge, the faults in his creation."

The confusing layout of the library's structure was also addressed in a book by architect Ruth Conroy Dalton and cognitive scientist Christoph Hölscher, called Take One Building: Interdisciplinary Research Perspectives of the Seattle Central Library. Researchers examined it as a model case for investigating the interplay between the building's complexity and individual differences in wayfinding ability.

== Additional images ==
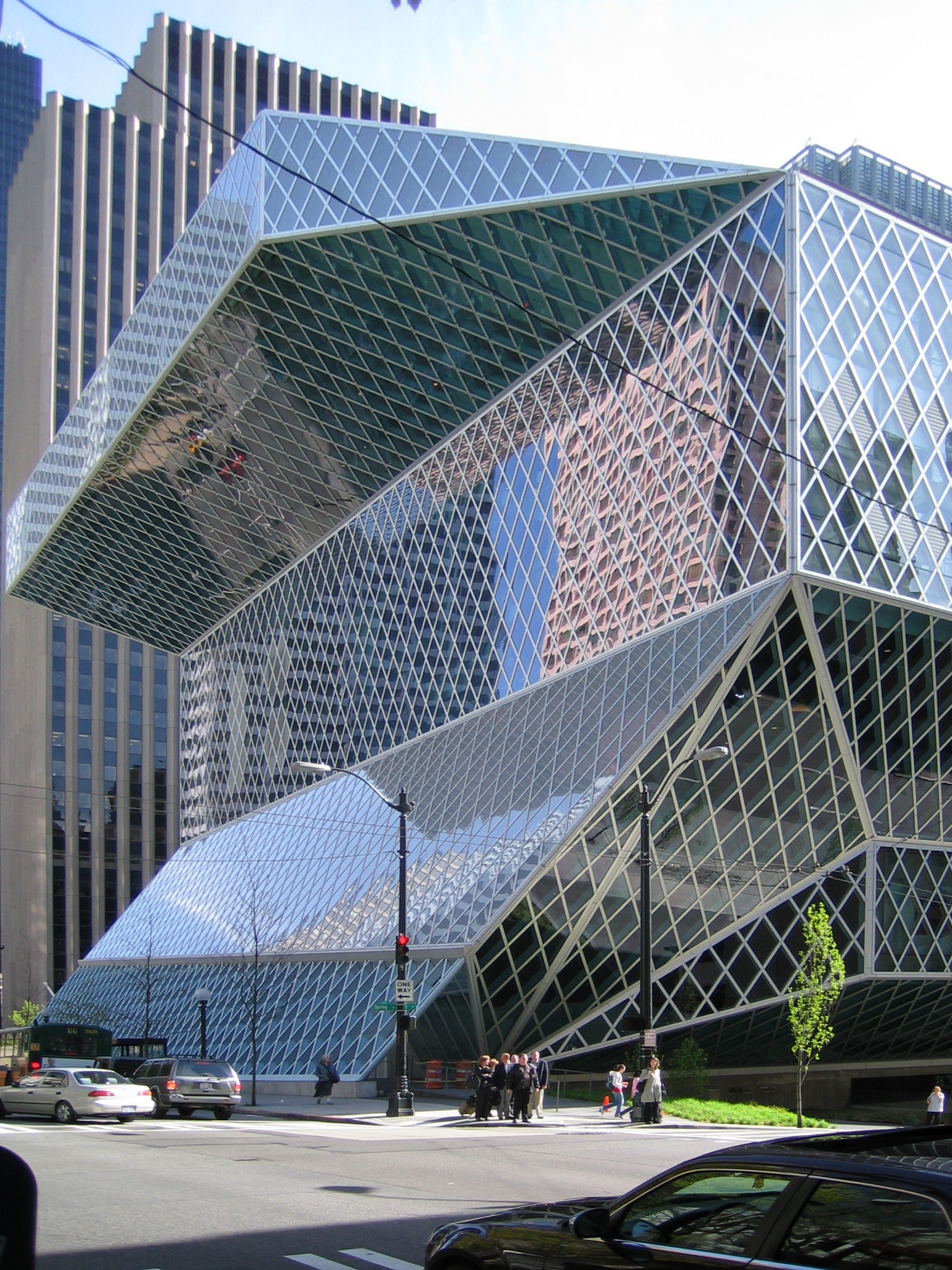

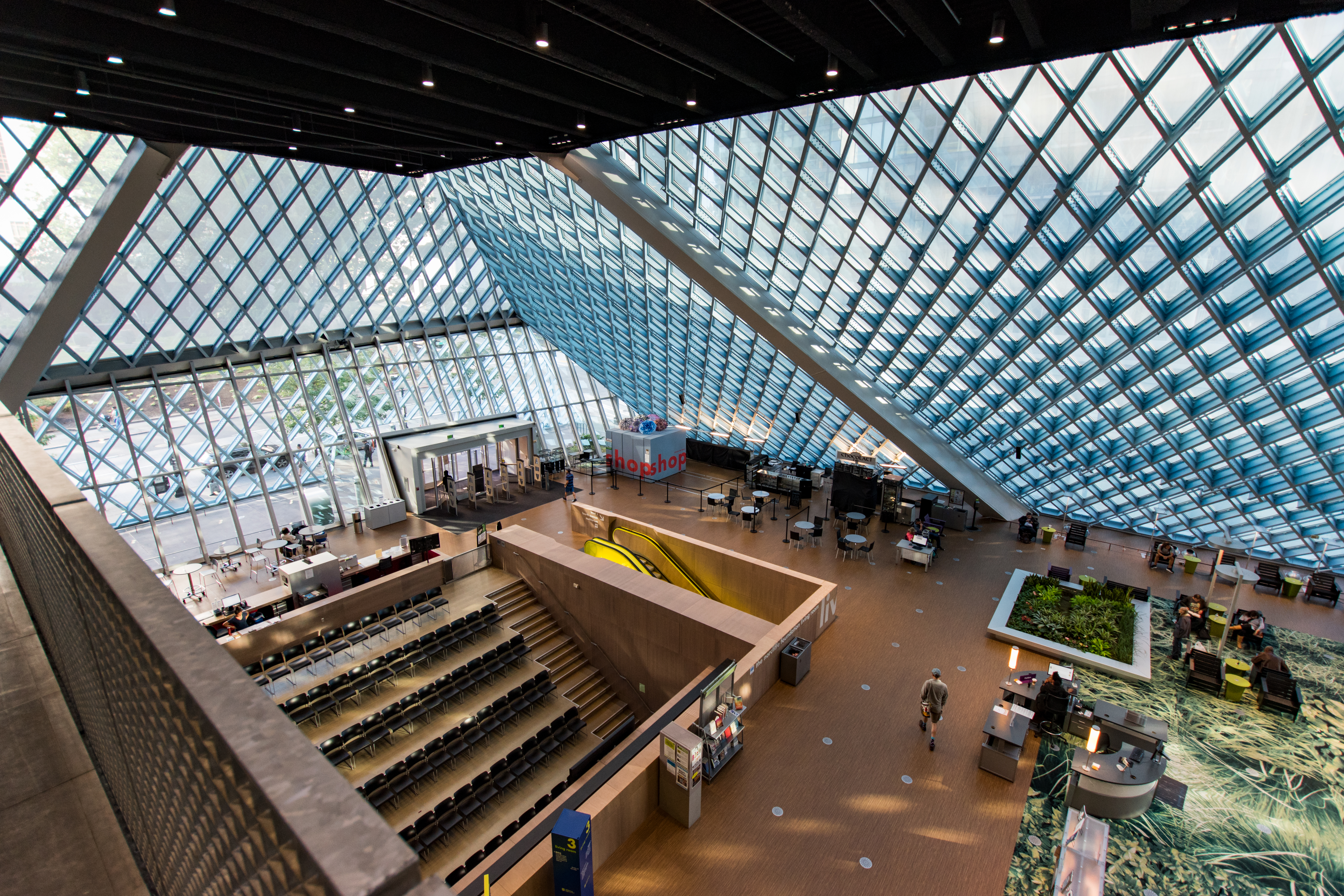

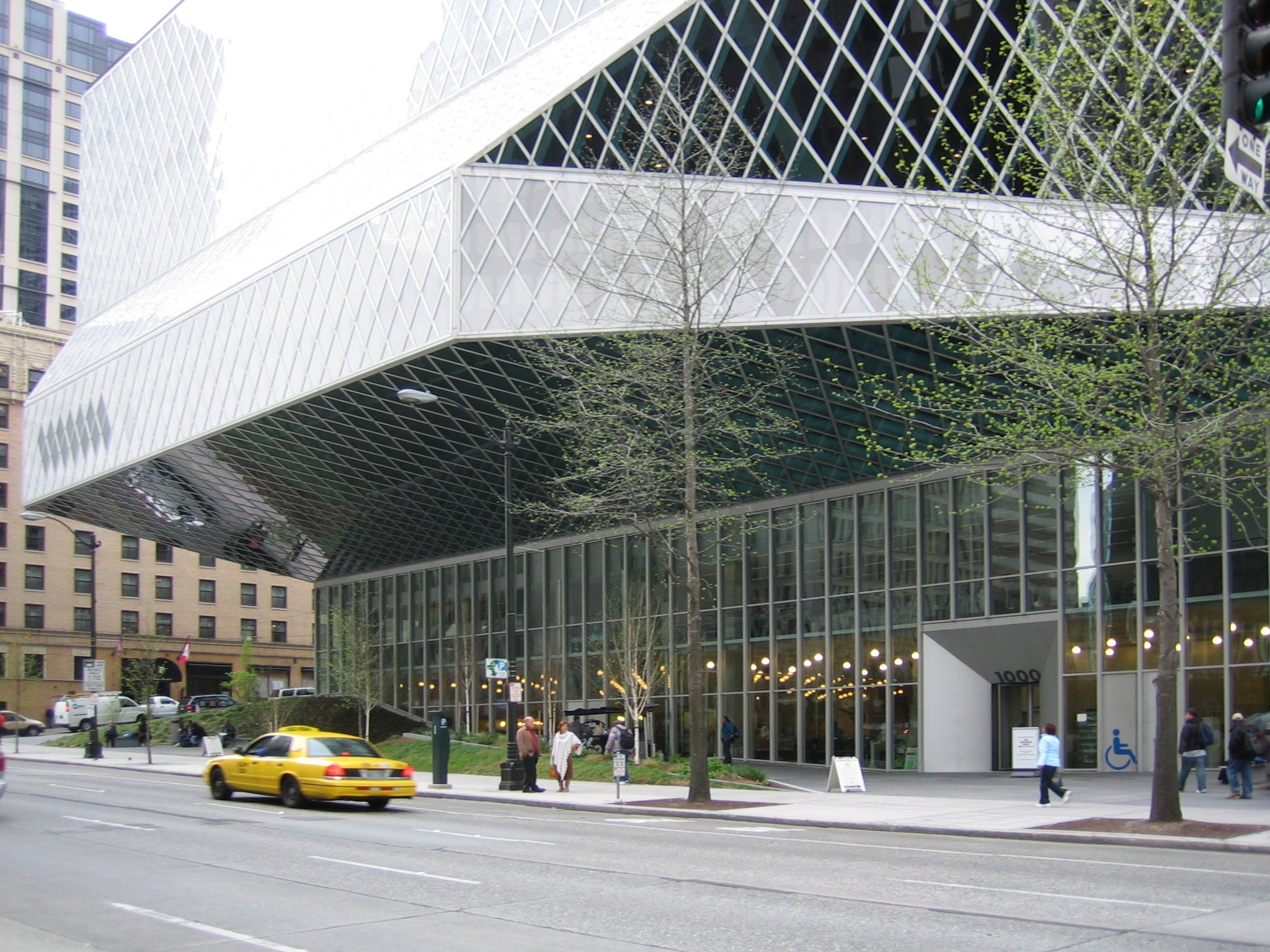

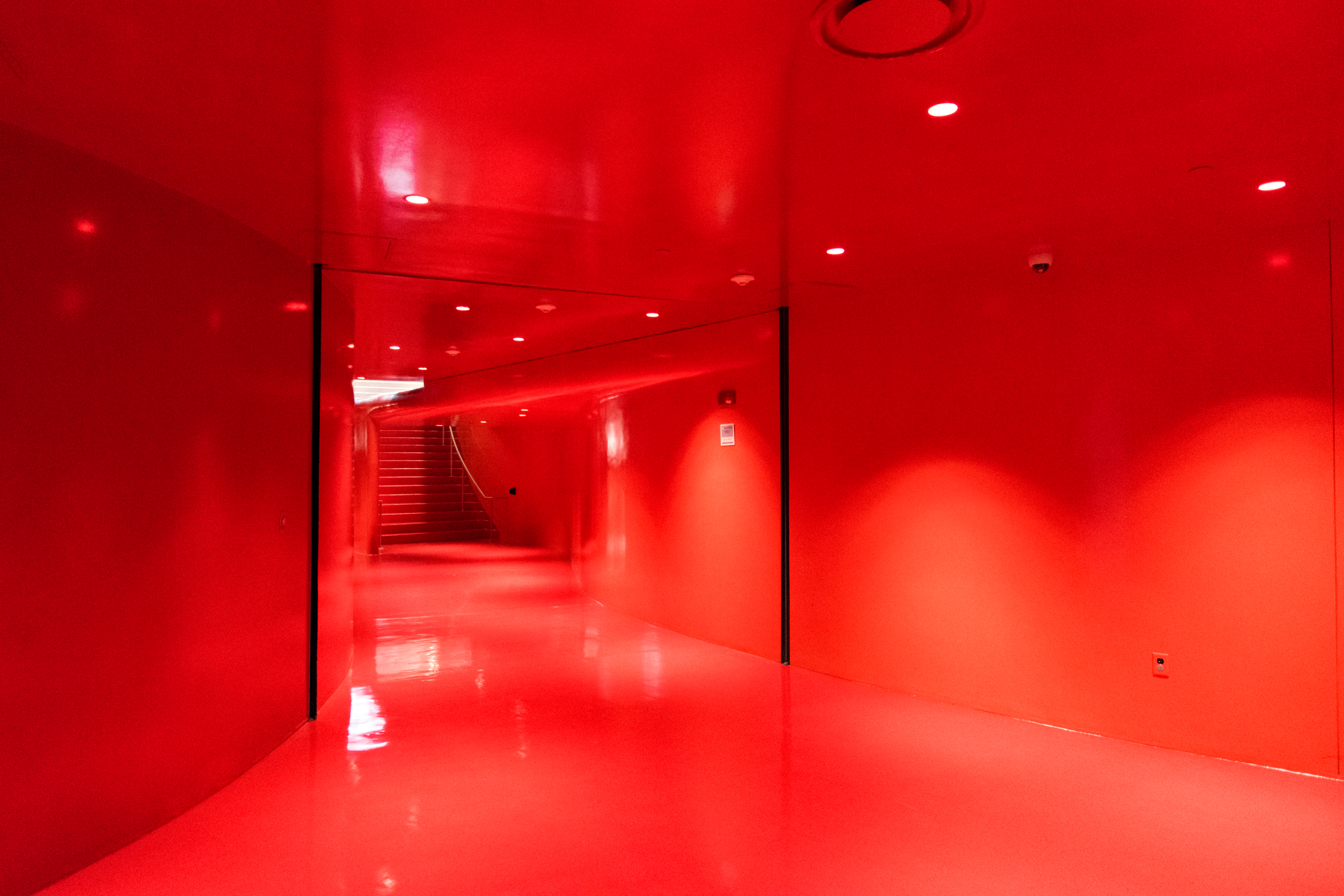

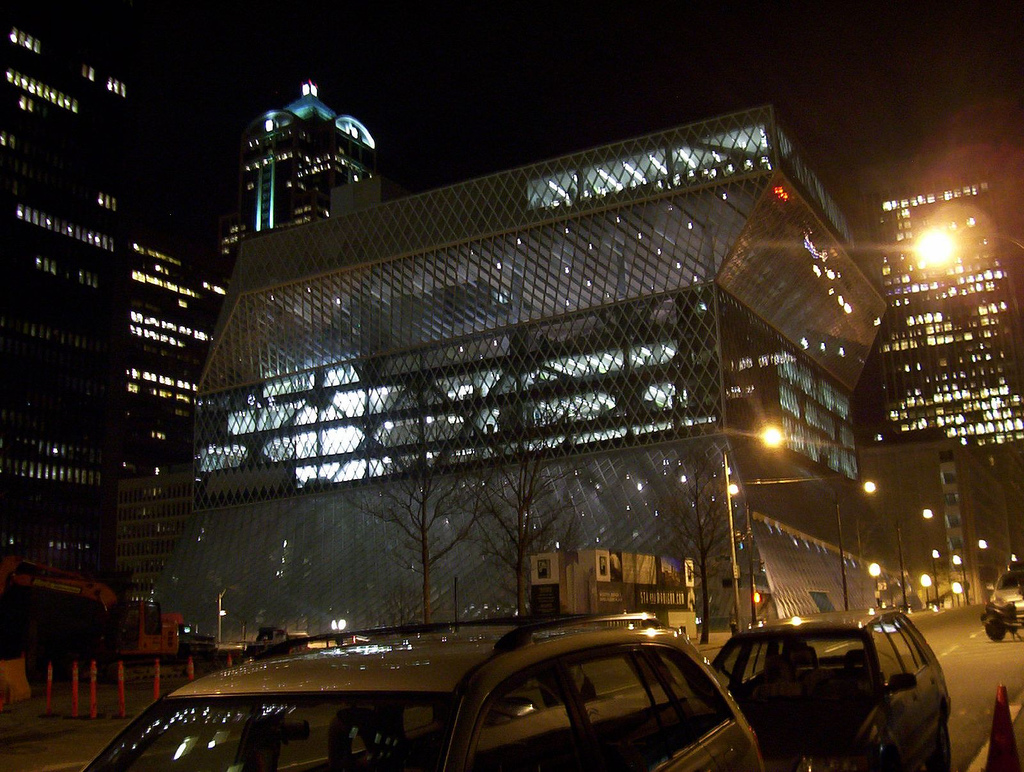

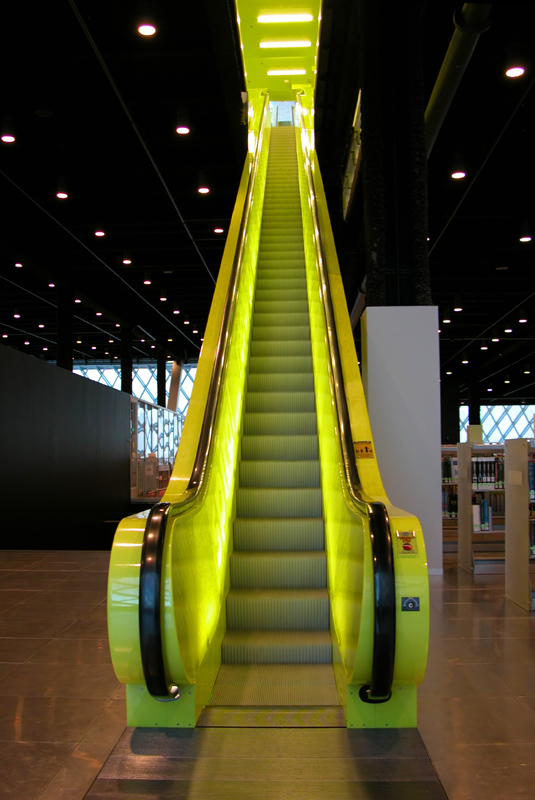

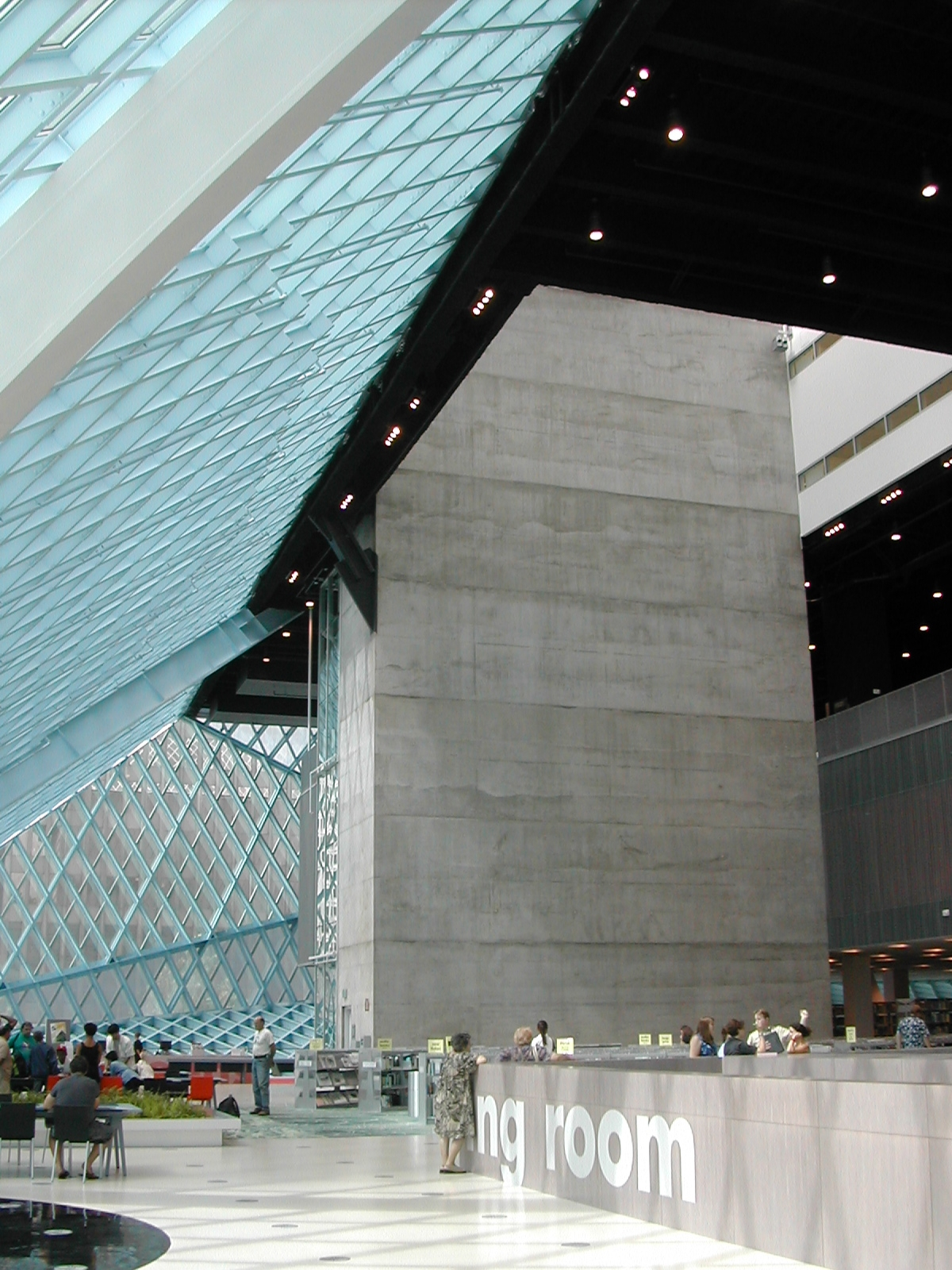

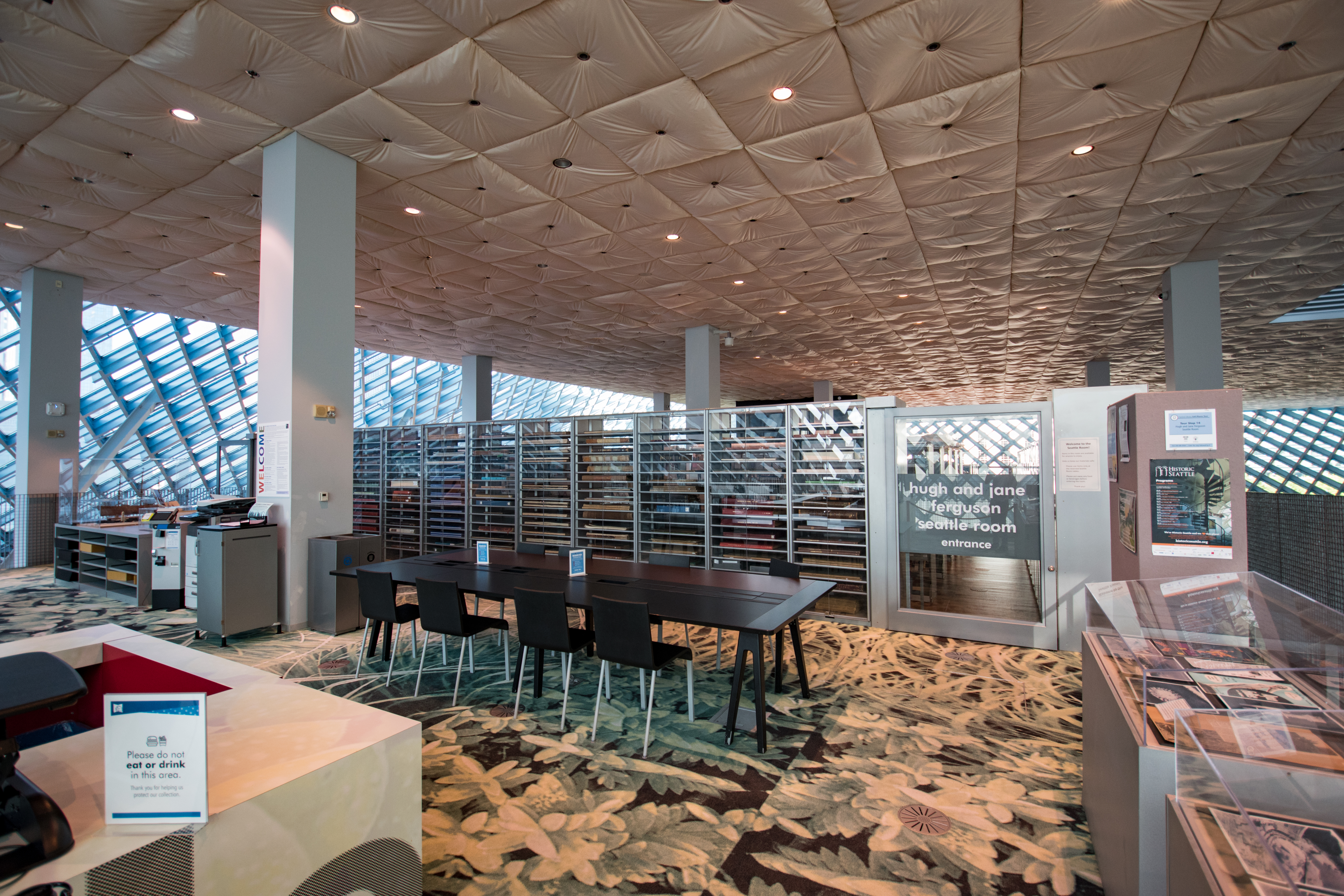

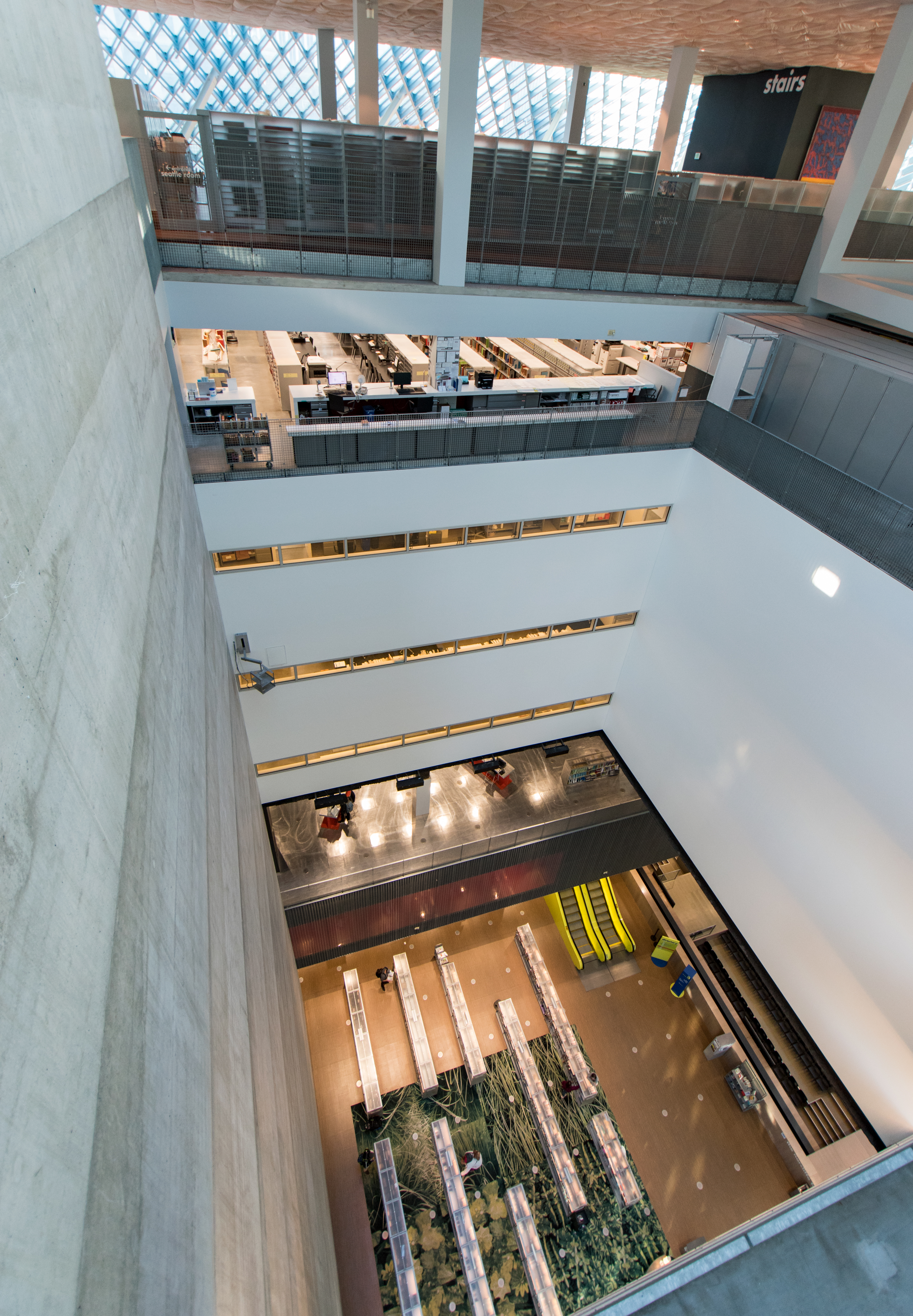
