= Francine (given name) =

- Pronunciation: fran-SENE
- Gender: Female

Origin
- Language: French
- Meaning: Free One, From France
- Region of origin: France

Other names
- Alternative spelling: Francene

Francine is a female given name. The name is of French origin. The name Francine was most popular in France itself during the 1940s, and was well used in the United States during the 1940s and 1950s. Short forms are Fran and Frannie.

== Translations ==
- Afrikaans: Francine
- Catalan: Francina
- Danish: Frandsine
- Dutch: Francien
- English: Frankie
- Filipino: Franxine
- French: Françoise
- German: Franziska
- Italian: Francesca
- Norwegian: Frances
- Polish: Franciszka
- Portuguese: Francesa, Francisca
- Slovak: Frantiska
- Spanish: Francisca
- Zulu: Rancina

== Persons ==
- Francine Bergé (born 1938), French film and stage actress
- Francine Brunel-Reeves (1933–2018), Québécois singer, caller and researcher
- Francene Cosman (born 1941), Canadian politician from Nova Scotia
- Francine Descartes (1635–1640), René Descartes' daughter
- Francine Diaz (born 2004), Filipina teen actress and model
- Francine "Fran" Drescher (born 1957), American actress, comedienne and producer
- Francine Gálvez (born 1966), Cameroonian-born Spanish television presenter
- Francine Gaudet (born 1948), Canadian politician
- Francine Jordi (born 1977), Swiss pop singer
- Francine Justa (1942–2016), American activist and affordable housing advocate in New York City
- Francine Lalonde (1940–2014), Canadian Quebec provincial politician
- Francine McKenna, American journalist, blogger, and columnist
- Francine G. McNairy, American academic administrator
- Francine Meeks née Fournier (born 1972), professional wrestler
- Francine Misasi (1944–2001), Clerk of the New York State Assembly 1985–2000
- Francine Mussey (1897–1933), French actress
- Francine Pascal (born 1938), American author
- Francine Pelletier (writer) (born 1959), Canadian science fiction author
- Francine Pelletier (journalist) (born c. 1955), Canadian television and print journalist
- Francine Prieto (born 1982), Filipino-Norwegian beauty queen, fashion model, product endorser, singer, actress and child star
- Francine Prose (born 1947), American writer
- Francine Reed (born 1947), American blues singer
- Francine Rivers (born 1947), American author of fiction with Christian themes
- Francine Stock (born 1958), British radio and TV presenter and novelist
- Francine Villeneuve (born 1964), Canadian thoroughbred jockey and racing pioneer
- Francine Weisweiller née Worms (1916–2003), French socialite and patron of Yves Saint Laurent and Jean Cocteau
- Francine York (1936–2017), American movie and television actress

== Fictional characters ==
- Francine Briggs, a mean English teacher in the Nickelodeon sitcom iCarly portrayed by Mindy Sterling
- Francine Frensky, character on the children's book and animated television series Arthur voiced by Jodie Resther
- Francine Smith, character on the animated television series American Dad! voiced by Wendy Schaal
- Francine "Frankie" Osborne, character in UK soap opera Hollyoaks, portrayed by Helen Pearson
- Francine "Frankie" Osborne, character in UK soap opera Hollyoaks, portrayed by Isabelle Smith
- Francine, an Animal Crossing snooty villager
- Francine Nebulon, a character on the TV series Lloyd in Space voiced by Nicolette Little
- Francine "Franny" Fantootsie, titular character from the children's animated television series Franny's Feet voiced by Phoebe McAuley
- Francine Carruthers, a major antagonist from the TV series The Electric Company portrayed by Ashley Austin Morris
- Francine, a female sloth from Ice Age: Collision Course voiced by Melissa Rauch
- Francine Frye, a supervillain appearing from Marvel Comics, also known as "Electro" in Spidey and His Amazing Friends
- Francine "Fran" Joy Fine, main character from the TV series The NannyThe Nanny

== Other ==
- Francine (band), indie rock band from Boston
- "Francine" (song), a 1971 song by American rock band ZZ Top from their album Rio Grande Mud
- List of storms named Francene
  - Hurricane Francine, a 2024 hurricane that struck southeast Louisiana
- Francine (cat), a cat living in a Richmond, Virginia Lowe's

== See also ==
- Francina (name)
