= Pieter Jacobsz. Duyfhuysen =

Dutch Golden Age painter

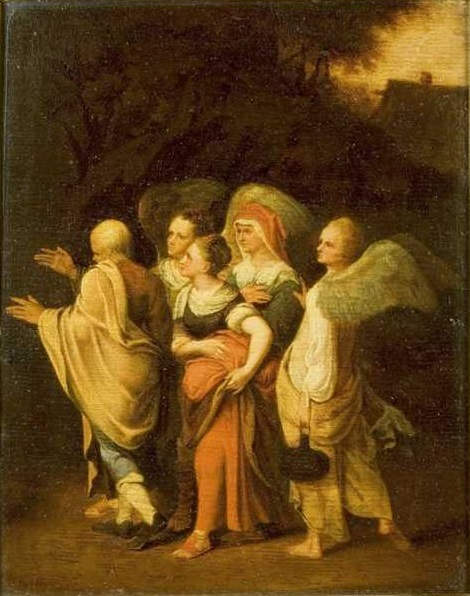
- Lot and his daughters, collection Museum Rotterdam
- Born: 1608; Rotterdam
- Died: 1677 (aged 68–69); Rotterdam
- Notable work: Peasant interior
- Style: genre art

Pieter Jacobsz. Duyfhuysen (1608–1677) was a Dutch Golden Age painter of genre.

Duyfhuysen was born and died in Rotterdam. According to the RKD he was also known as Colinchovius. He worked in Rotterdam except for a short stay in Haarlem, where he was probably a pupil of Torrentius, during the years 1625–1627.

== Sources ==
- Rosen, Jochai (2005). "On the question of portraits in some Dutch 17th-Century genre paintings". Dutch Crossing. 29 (2). Informa UK Limited: 265–288. doi:10.1080/03096564.2005.11730862. ISSN 0309-6564.
- Van de Watering, Willem L. (1987). "Pieter Duyfhuysen (1608-1677): een reconstructie van het oeuvre van een vergeten Rotterdamse schilder van boereninterieurs". In Bock, H.; Gaehtgens, T.W. (eds.). Holländische Genremalerei im 17. Jahrhundert: Symposium Berlin 1984. Jahrbuch Preussischer Kulturbesitz: Sonderband (in Dutch). Berlin, West Germany: Mann. pp. 357–384. ISBN 978-3-7861-1499-4.
