= Francina (name) =

Francina or Francena is a common feminine given name as well as a surname. Notable people with the name include

== Given name Francina ==
- Francina Armengol (born 1971), Spanish politician
- Francina Elsje Blankers-Koen (1918–2004), Dutch track and field athlete known as Fanny Blankers-Koen
- Francina Broese Gunningh (1783-1824), Dutch soldier
- Francina Díaz Mestre, Spanish model
- Francina Louise Schot, Dutch painter
- Francina Margaretha van Huysum (1707–1789), Dutch painter
- Francina Pubill (born 1960), Spanish footballer
- Francina Sorabji (1833–1910), Indian educator
- Francina Susanna Louw, South African missionary and linguist

== Given name Francena ==
- Francena McCorory (born 1988), American athlete
- Francena H. Arnold (1888–1972), American novelist

== Last name ==
- Marc Francina (1948–2018), French politician

== See also ==
- Euphaedra francina, a butterfly species
- Francine (given name)
- Francinaina Cirer Carbonell (1781–1855), Spanish religious figure
