= Tiiu Kuik =

Estonian model (born 1987)

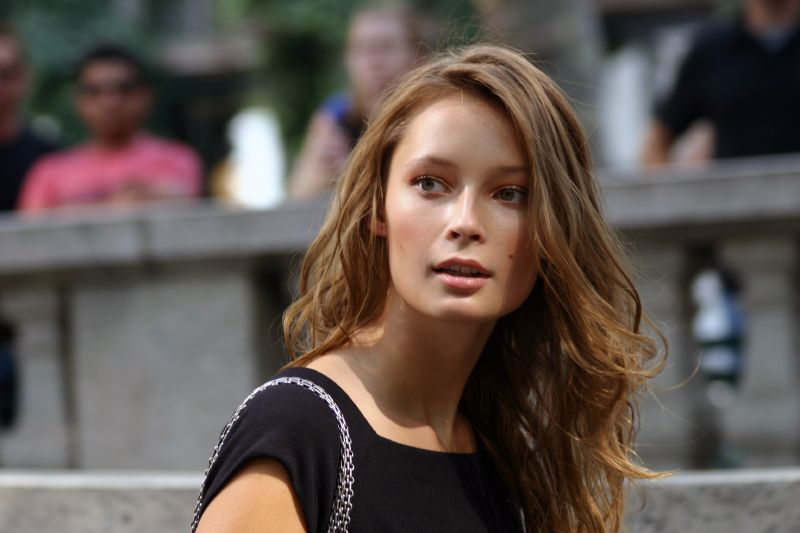
- Tiiu Kuik at 2007 Mercedes-Benz Fashion Week, 8 September 2007
- Born: 16 March 1987 (age 39); Tallinn, then part of Estonian SSR, Soviet Union
- Modeling information
- Height: 1.88 m (6 ft 2 in)
- Hair color: Blonde
- Eye color: Green
- Agency: Marilyn Models; Marilyn Agency; Francina; D Management; Storm Models

Tiiu Kuik (Estonian pronunciation: [ˈtiːu ˈkui̯k]; born 16 March 1987) is an Estonian fashion model.

== Early life ==
Born in Tallinn, Estonian SSR, Kuik was discovered at age 13 in an Estonian supermarket by model scout Paolo Moglia. She was then sent to Japan for modeling work, and after that, to Italy.

== Modeling ==
Her modeling agencies include her mother agency, Marilyn New York, D Management Milan and the famous Marilyn Agency in Paris.

She has walked the runways for more than 50 designers, including Gucci (for which she opened the fall 2003 and spring 2004 shows), Chanel, Louis Vuitton, Versace, Ralph Lauren, Giorgio Armani, Paul Smith, Narciso Rodriguez, Paco Rabanne, Salvatore Ferragamo, Dsquared2, Emilio Pucci, Fendi, Prada, Jil Sander, Marc Jacobs, Karl Lagerfeld, Jean Paul Gaultier, John Galliano, Dolce & Gabbana, Chloé and many others. Kuik's face has graced the covers of several high-profile fashion magazines like Elle, Marie Claire, Velvet and multiple Vogue covers. She also has appeared in fashion advertising campaigns for: Christian Dior (J'Adore fragrance), Louis Vuitton, Moschino, Valentino, Pollini, Bill Blass, MontBlanc, Kenneth Cole, Neiman Marcus, Bergdorf Goodman, Swarovski and many others.

She is now representing CoverGirl cosmetics and appeared in a CoverGirl commercial with Queen Latifah and America's Next Top Model, Dani Evans.

She is noted and recognized for her mole on her left cheek.
