= Reinier de Graaf (architect) =

Dutch architect, architectural theorist, urbanist and writer

Reinier Hendrik de Graaf
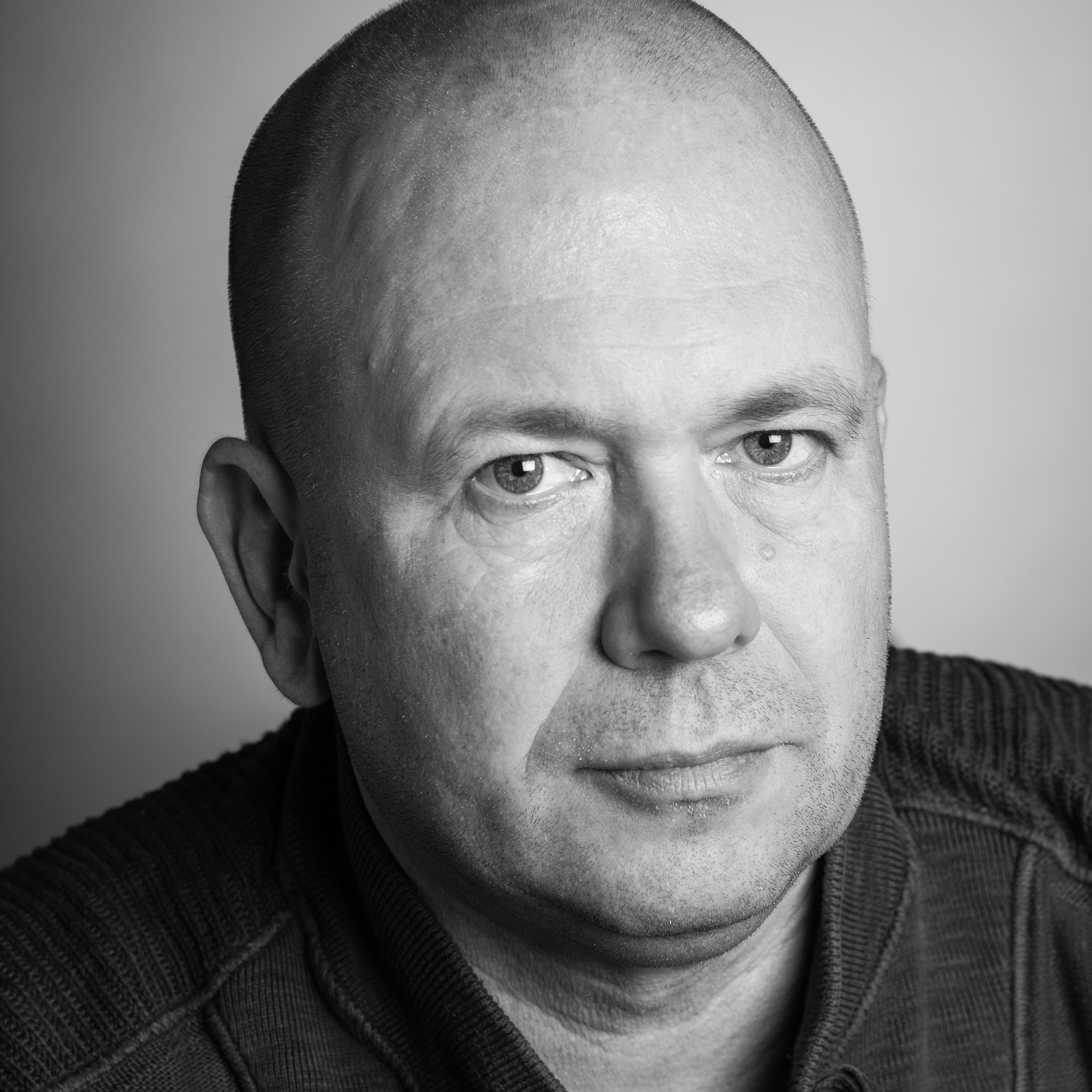
- Born: 30 June 1964 (age 62); Schiedam, Netherlands
- Education: TU Delft; Berlage Institute
- Occupations: architect, urbanist, writer

Reinier de Graaf (born 1964) is a Dutch architect, architectural theorist, urbanist and writer. He is a partner in the Office for Metropolitan Architecture (OMA), and author of the books Four Walls and a Roof: The Complex Nature of a Simple Profession and The Masterplan.

== Life ==
Reinier Hendrik de Graaf was born in Schiedam, Netherlands, where he graduated from Stedelijk Gymnasium in 1982. He holds an architecture diploma from Delft University and a master's degree in architecture from the Berlage Institute. De Graaf worked for architecture firms in the Netherlands and the United Kingdom before joining OMA in 1996.

== Work ==
=== OMA ===
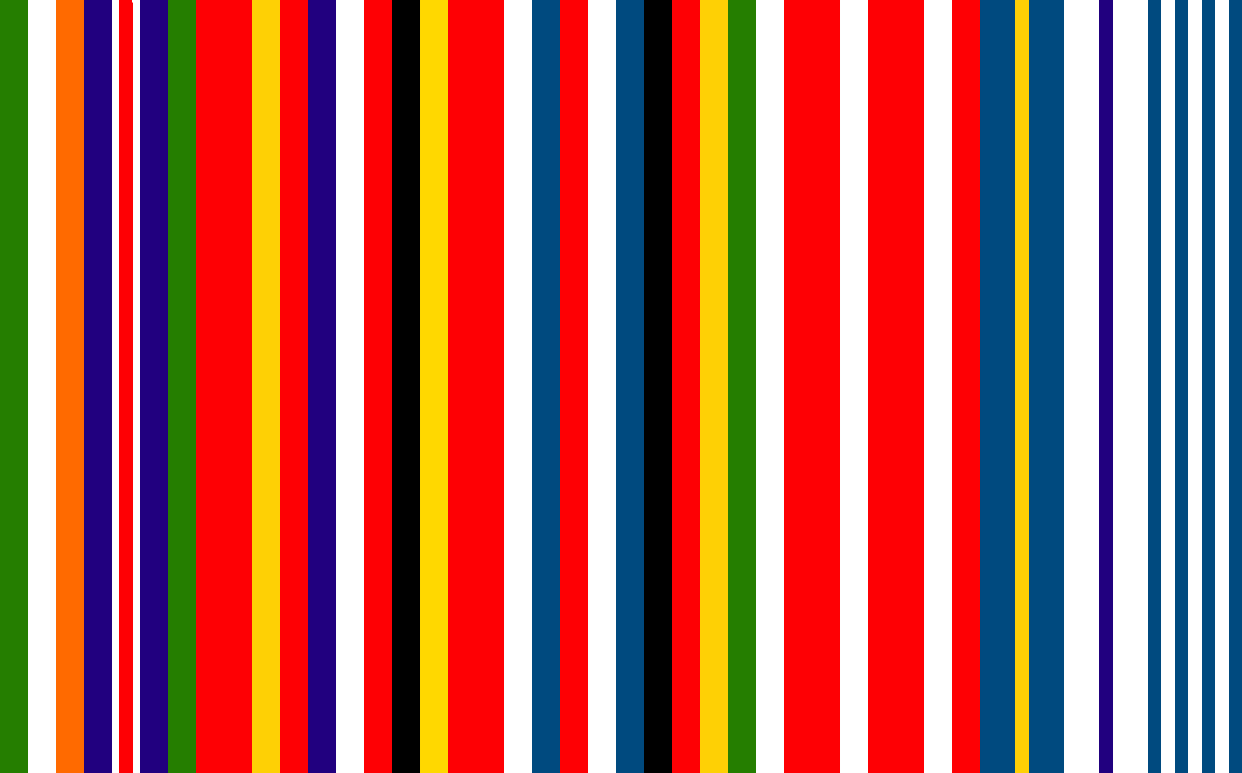
The Image of Europe, AMO's proposal for the European Flag

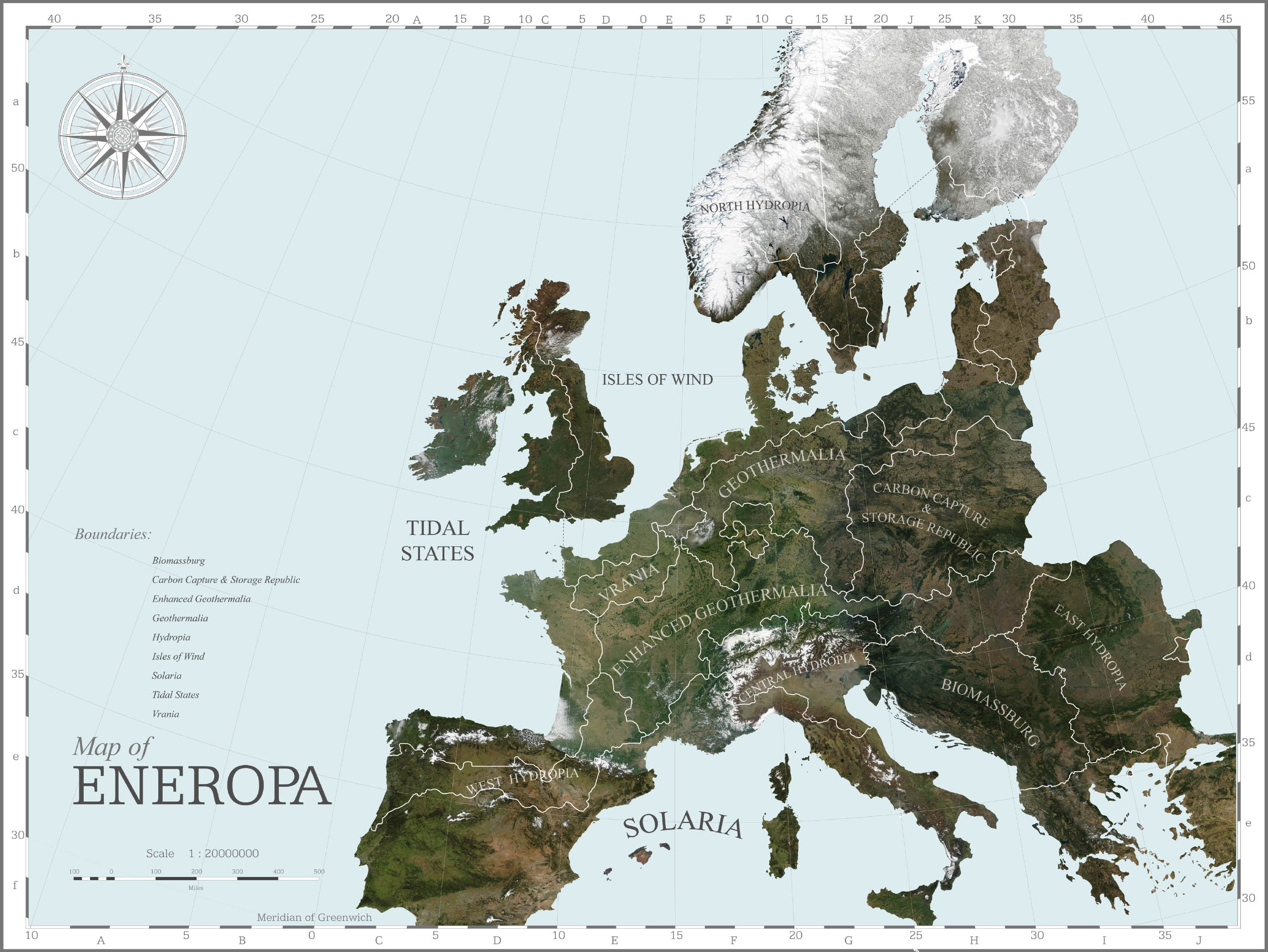
Eneropa, Europe reorganized according to the type of energy each region brings to the grid (Roadmap 2050: A Practical Guide to a Prosperous, Low-Carbon Europe)

Reinier de Graaf is OMA’s longest serving non-founding partner. He is responsible for building and master planning projects in Europe, Russia and the Middle East. His built projects include Norra Tornen (2020) in Stockholm, winner of the International Highrise Award in 2020; the nhow RAI Hotel (2019) in Amsterdam; Holland Green (2016), the redevelopment of the former Commonwealth Institute in London; Timmerhuis (2015) in Rotterdam, the new G-Star Headquarters (2014) in Amsterdam; and De Rotterdam (2013). Among De Graaf's ongoing projects is Mangalem 21, a residential housing development in Tirana. He has led the masterplan of the Skolkovo Innovation Centre (the “Russian Silicon Valley”) and the Greater Moscow Development Framework. His involvement in the future planning of Amsterdam Airport Schiphol and the Hamad International Airport in Qatar have made him widely regarded as one of the world's leading experts on the development of airports as urban systems.

Since 2019, De Graaf has led OMA's research on healthcare architecture. He has co-authored the film The Hospital of the Future, which premiered at Matadero Madrid in 2020 and is on view at the Venice Biennale of Architecture.

=== AMO ===
Since 2002, De Graaf has directed the work of AMO, OMA’s think tank. AMO’s clients include Prada, Universal Studios, Condé Nast, Schiphol Airport, the Hermitage Museum, Harvard University and the European Union, for which it conceived a new graphic identity in 2004, including a proposal for a new European flag. De Graaf is responsible for AMO’s involvement in sustainability and energy planning, with projects such as Zeekracht: A Strategic Masterplan for the North Sea; Roadmap 2050: A Practical Guide to a Prosperous, Low-Carbon Europe for the European Climate Foundation; and The Energy Report, a global plan for 100 percent renewable energy by 2050, made with the WWF.

In 2011, De Graaf curated the exhibition On Hold at the British School in Rome about the impact of the financial crisis on OMA's master planning work across the globe. The exhibition Public Works: Architecture by Civil Servants featured at the Venice Biennale of Architecture in 2012 and at the König Galerie Berlin in 2013.

== Teaching ==
In 2010, De Graaf was involved in the founding of the Strelka Institute for Media, Architecture and Design in Moscow, where he taught topics such as energy planning, the history of utopian predictions and the advent of the megacity. In 2014, he continued the research on megacities with graduate students at PennDesign, the architecture program at the University of Pennsylvania, under the title Megalopoli(tic)s.

In 2018, De Graaf taught a design studio at the Harvard University Graduate School of Design titled “Phantom Urbanism.” The studio produced a database of urban projects that never managed to attract residents.

Since 2018, De Graaf is the Sir Arthur Marshall Visiting Professor of Urban Design in the Department of Architecture at the University of Cambridge.

Since 2020, De Graaf teaches the 'Asset Class' seminar at The Berlage, which investigates the relation between architecture and finance.

== Publications ==
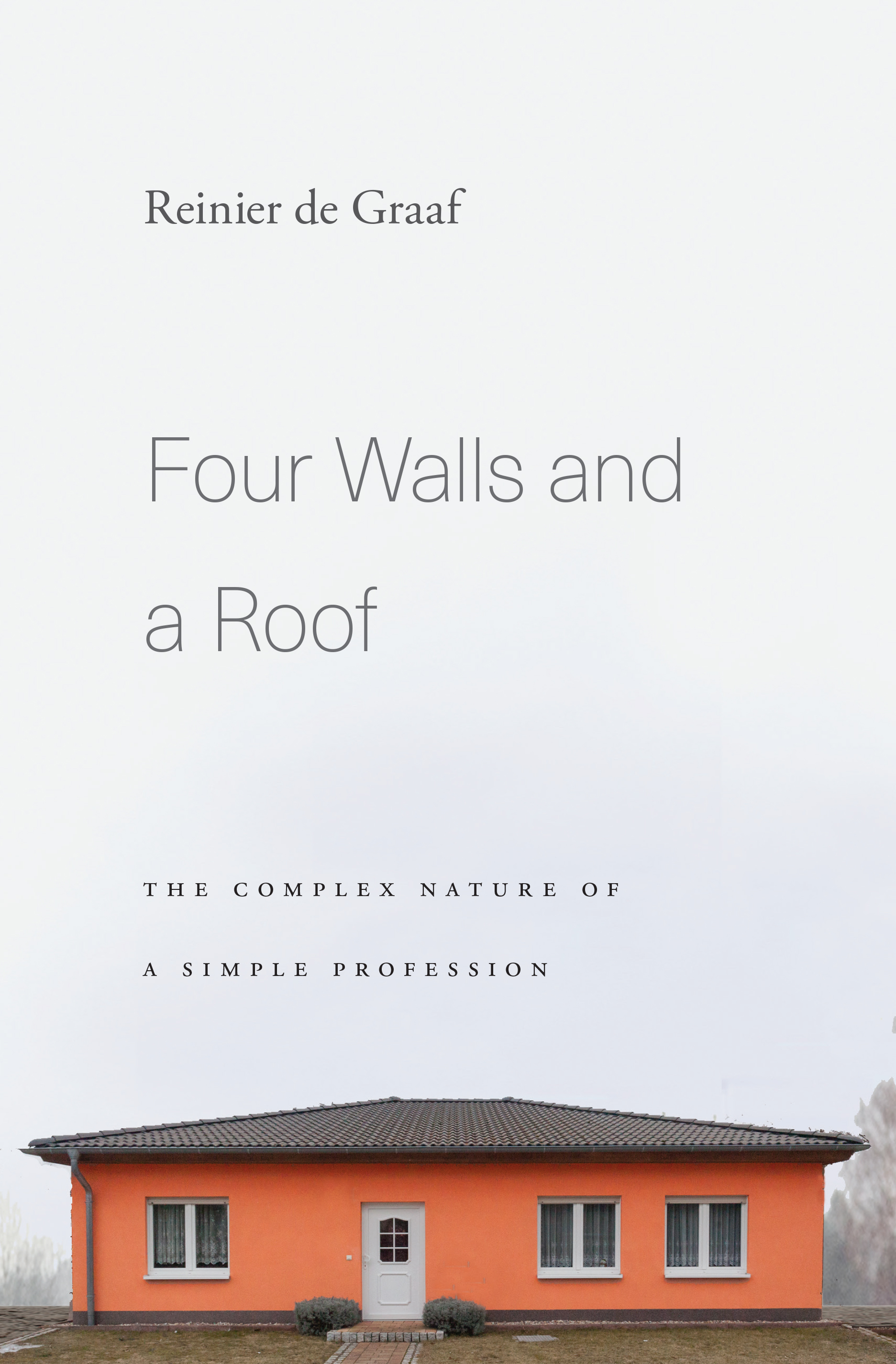
Four Walls and a Roof, the Complex Nature of a Simple Profession, Harvard University Press, 2017

De Graaf co-authored three books on behalf of OMA: Content (2003), Al-Manakh I (2007) and Al-Manakh II, Gulf Continued (2010).

De Graaf's first book under personal title Four Walls and a Roof: The Complex Nature of a Simple Profession, published in 2017, is a collection of essays on the changing nature of the architecture profession into the 21st century. Four Walls and a Roof was named among the best books of 2017 by The Financial Times and The Guardian.

In 2019, De Graaf was the guest editor of the German architecture magazine Baumeister.

De Graaf's second book The Masterplan, published in 2021, is a novel that chronicles the trajectory of an architect craving recognition. The Architects' Journal describes The Masterplan as "a short novel about professional vanity, succession within large practices and the Faustian dilemmas facing ‘international starchitects’." The book reflects on "the shifting and unstable nature of global power and the corrupting character of the global property market." His most recent publication is Architect, Verb: The New Language of Building (Verso, 2023), which "skewers the platitudes of the [architecture] industry".

== Selected text ==
- "The Real World," Volume #57, November 30, 2020, http://archis.org/volume/real-world-reinier-de-graaf/
- "The current crisis has exposed the structural shortcomings of our healthcare systems," Dezeen, April 22, 2020, https://www.dezeen.com/2020/04/22/coronavirus-shortcomings-healthcare-systems-reinier-de-graaf/
- "Too much is at stake to leave architecture to architects," Dezeen, January 20, https://www.dezeen.com/2020/01/20/placemaking-cities-reinier-de-graaf-opinion/
- "L’hôpital du futur devra être plus qu’un hôpital," Le Monde, November 15, 2019, https://www.lemonde.fr/idees/article/2019/11/15/reinier-de-graaf-l-hopital-du-futur-devra-etre-plus-qu-un-hopital_6019345_3232.html
- "In the age of big data, everything is quantifiable, even happiness," Dezeen, October 3, 2019
- "2008 (Year Zero)," Machine Books, 2019, https://www.machinebooks.co.uk/portfolio/2008-2/
- "Cabrini Blues," The New York Review of Books, September 27, 2018, https://www.nybooks.com/articles/2018/09/27/cabrini-green-blues/
- "Like it Never Happened: An 'IN MEMORIAM' by Architect Reinier de Graaf of OMA," 032c, January 30, 2018, https://032c.com/like-it-never-happened-an-in-memoriam-by-architect-reinier-de-graaf-of-oma
- “The Inevitable Box,” The Architectural Review, October 18, 2017, https://www.architectural-review.com/archive/notopia-archive/the-inevitable-box-architectures-main-achievement-and-its-main-trauma
- “How Architecture should adapt to Climate Change,” Time Magazine, September 22, 2017, https://time.com/4950746/architecture-buildings-climate-change-hurricane-earthquake-destruction/
- “Architecture Is Now a Tool of Capital, Complicit in a Purpose Antithetical to Its Social Mission,” The Architectural Review, April 24, 2015, https://www.architectural-review.com/rethink/viewpoints/architecture-is-now-a-tool-of-capital-complicit-in-a-purpose-antithetical-to-its-social-mission/8681564.article
- “Balance of power: a renewed case for renewable energy for Europe,” De Volkskrant, May 4, 2014, https://www.volkskrant.nl/vk/nl/3184/opinie/article/detail/3651397/2014/05/08/Europa-heeft-meer-energie-dan-het-Midden-Oosten.dhtml/
- “Tackling Climate Change Still a Luxury in Developing World,” CNN International, August 17, 2011, https://edition.cnn.com/2011/OPINION/08/17/graaf.climate.change.bind/index.html
- “Look Past the Livability Ranks,” Financial Times, April 7, 2010, http://www.ft.com/intl/cms/s/0/e6d98b84-38d4-11df-9998-00144feabdc0.html#axzz32AyNRN9F/

== Gallery ==
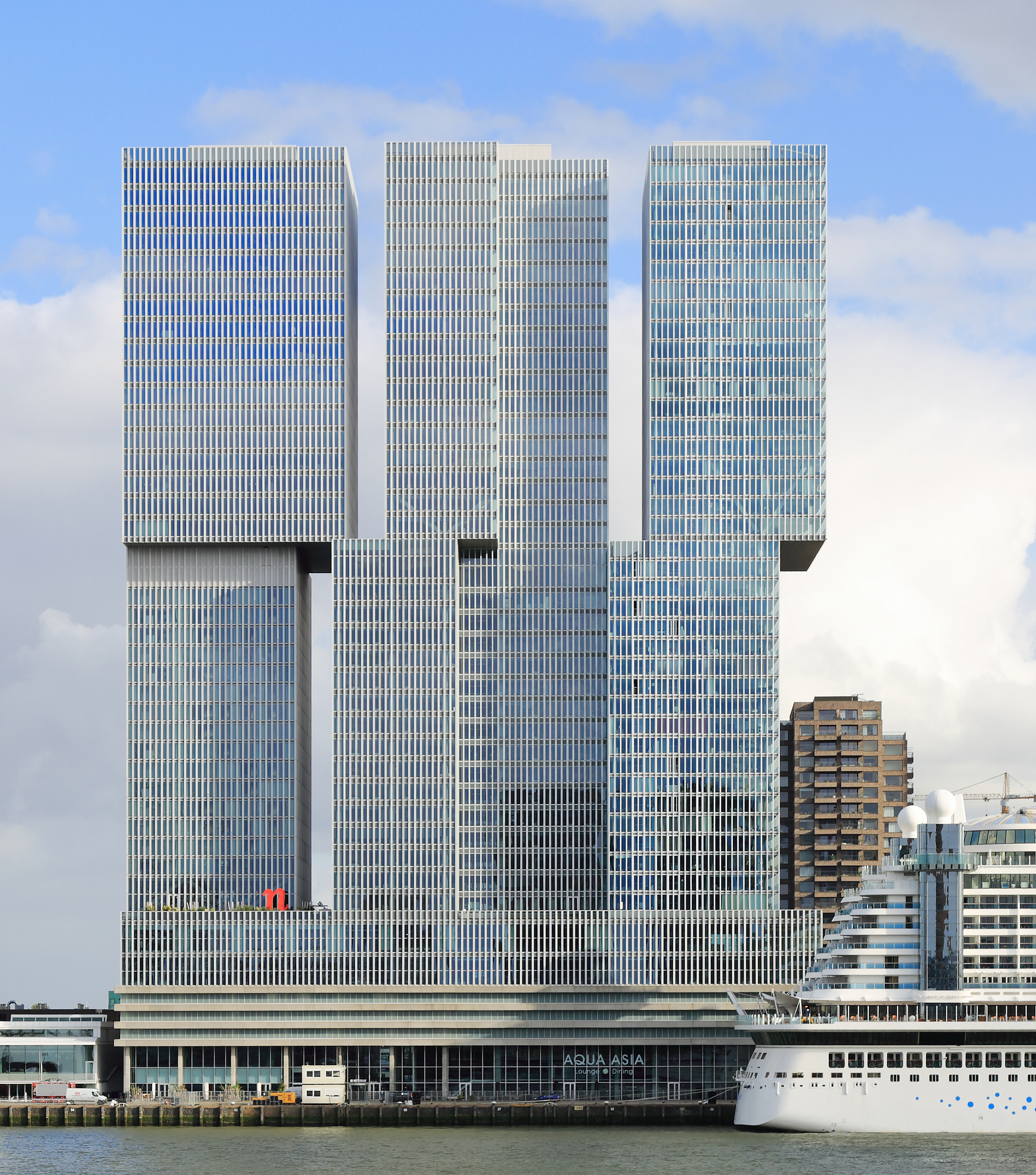
De Rotterdam, Rotterdam, The Netherlands, OMA

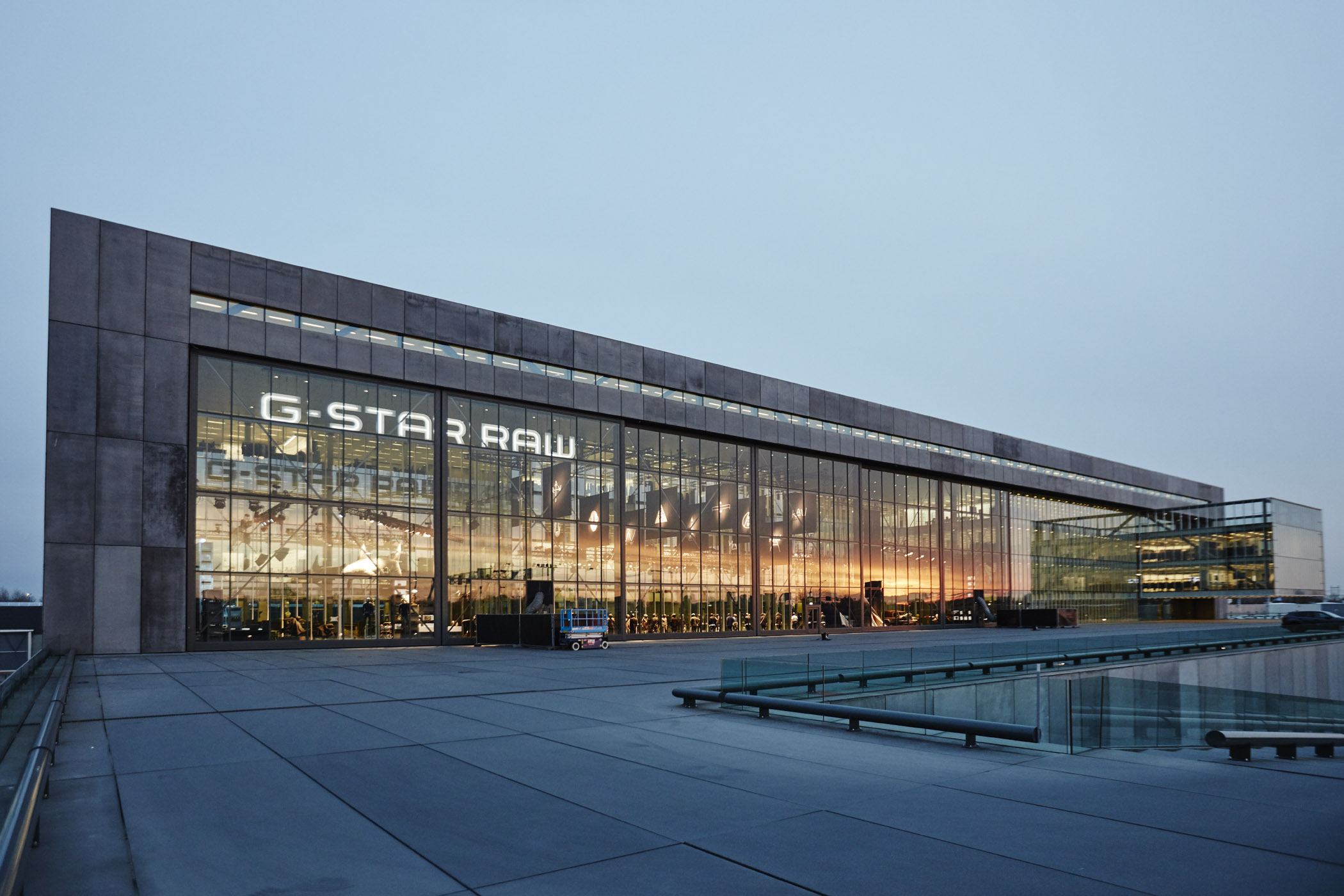
G-Star Raw Headquarters, Amsterdam, The Netherlands, OMA

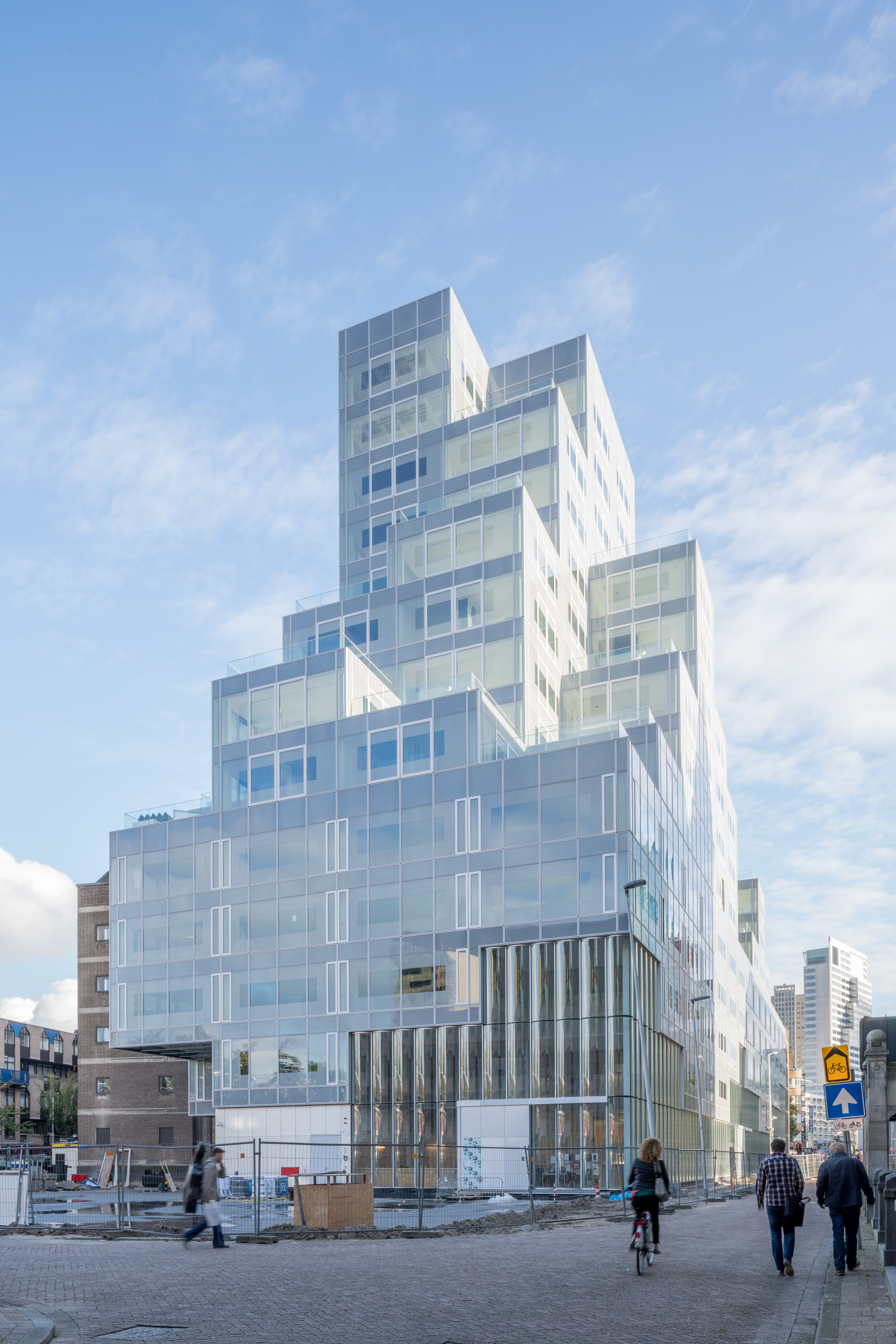
Timmerhuis, Rotterdam, The Netherlands, OMA

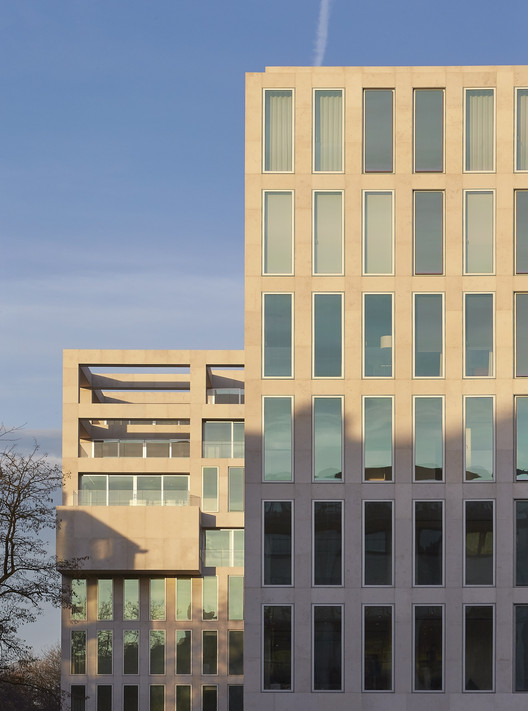
Holland Green, London, UK, OMA

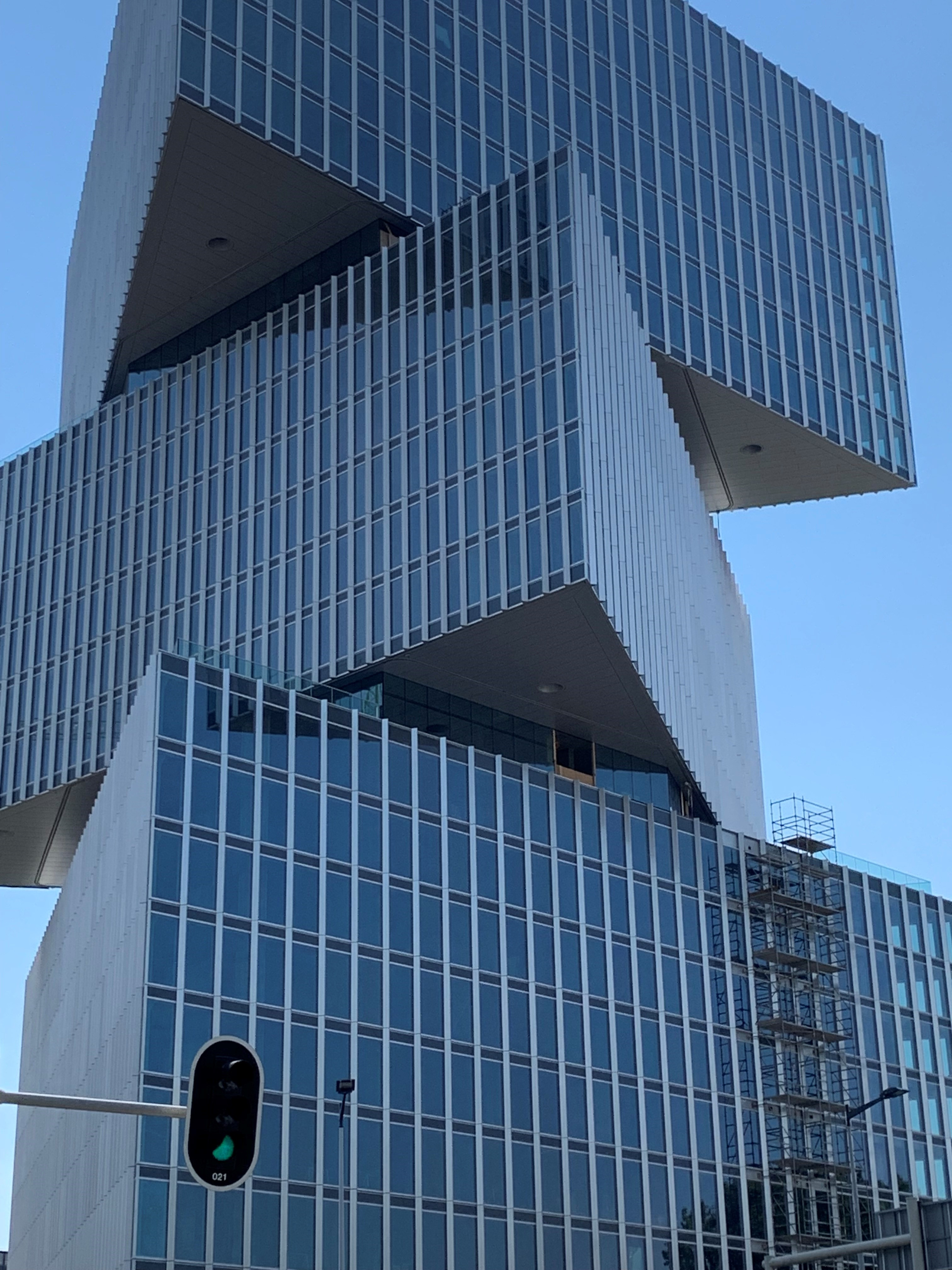
nhow Amsterdam RAI Hotel, Amsterdam, The Netherlands, OMA

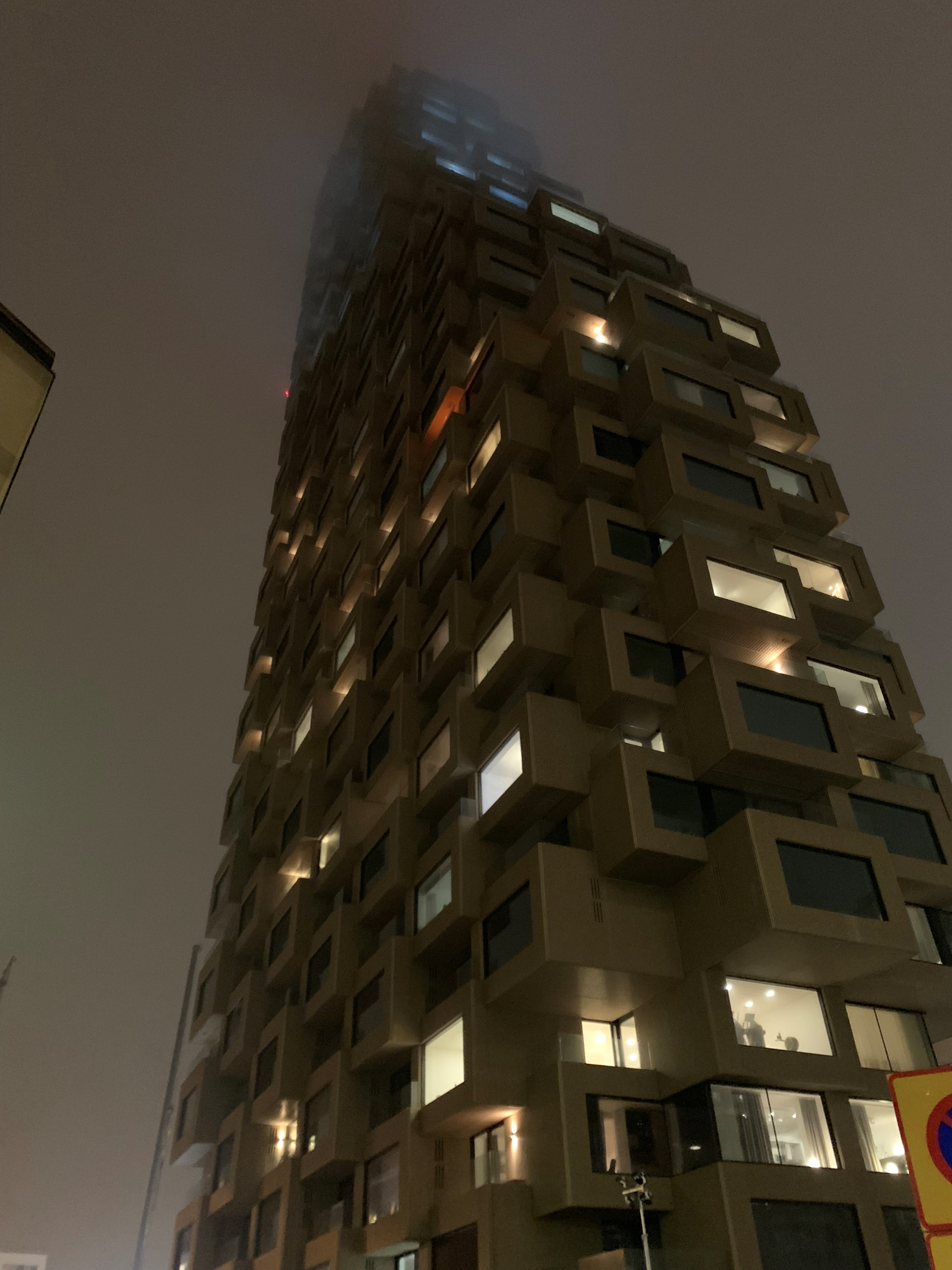
Norra Tornen, Stockholm, Sweden, OMA

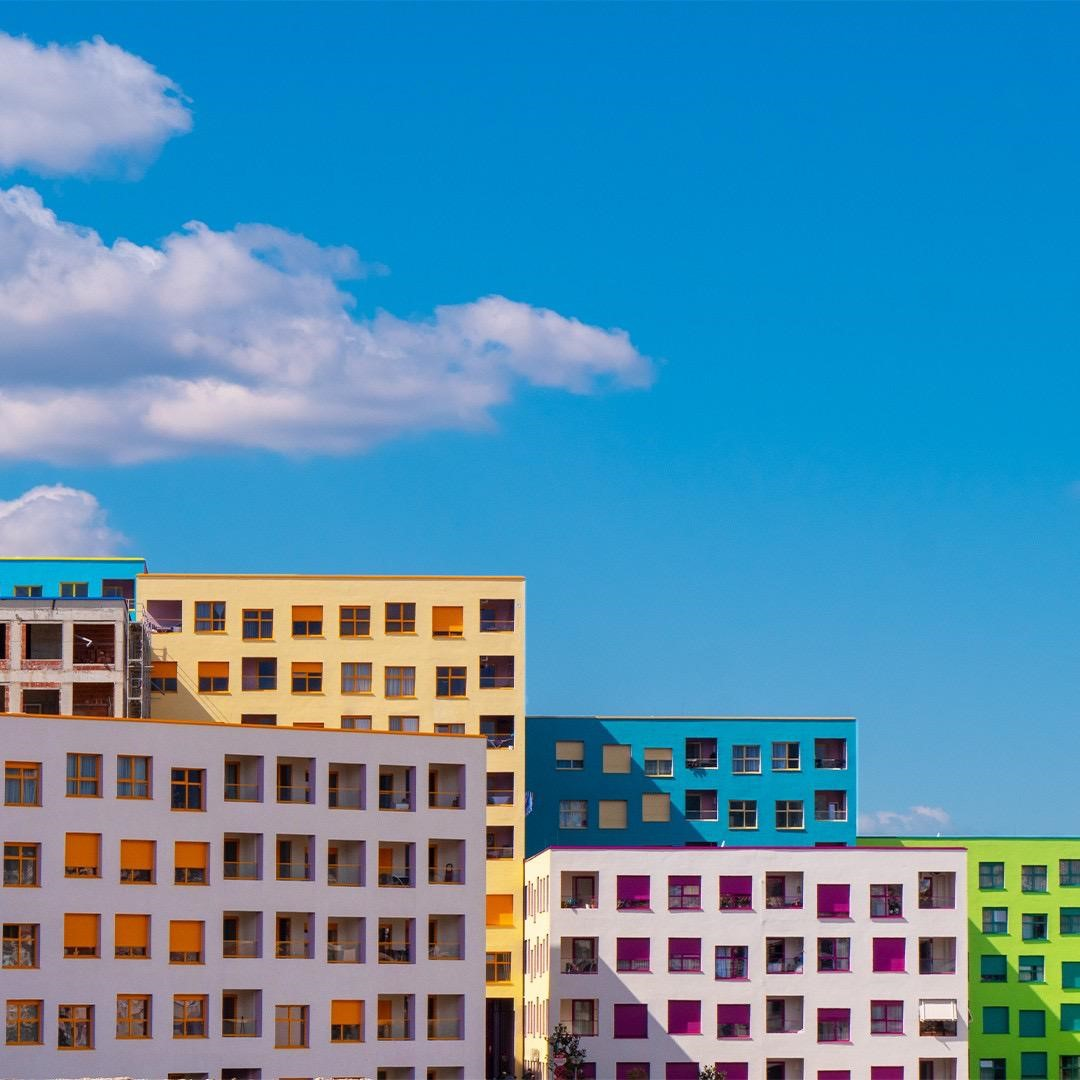
Mangalem 21, Tirana, Albania, OMA
