= Francine (cat) =

Viral cat in Richmond, Virginia

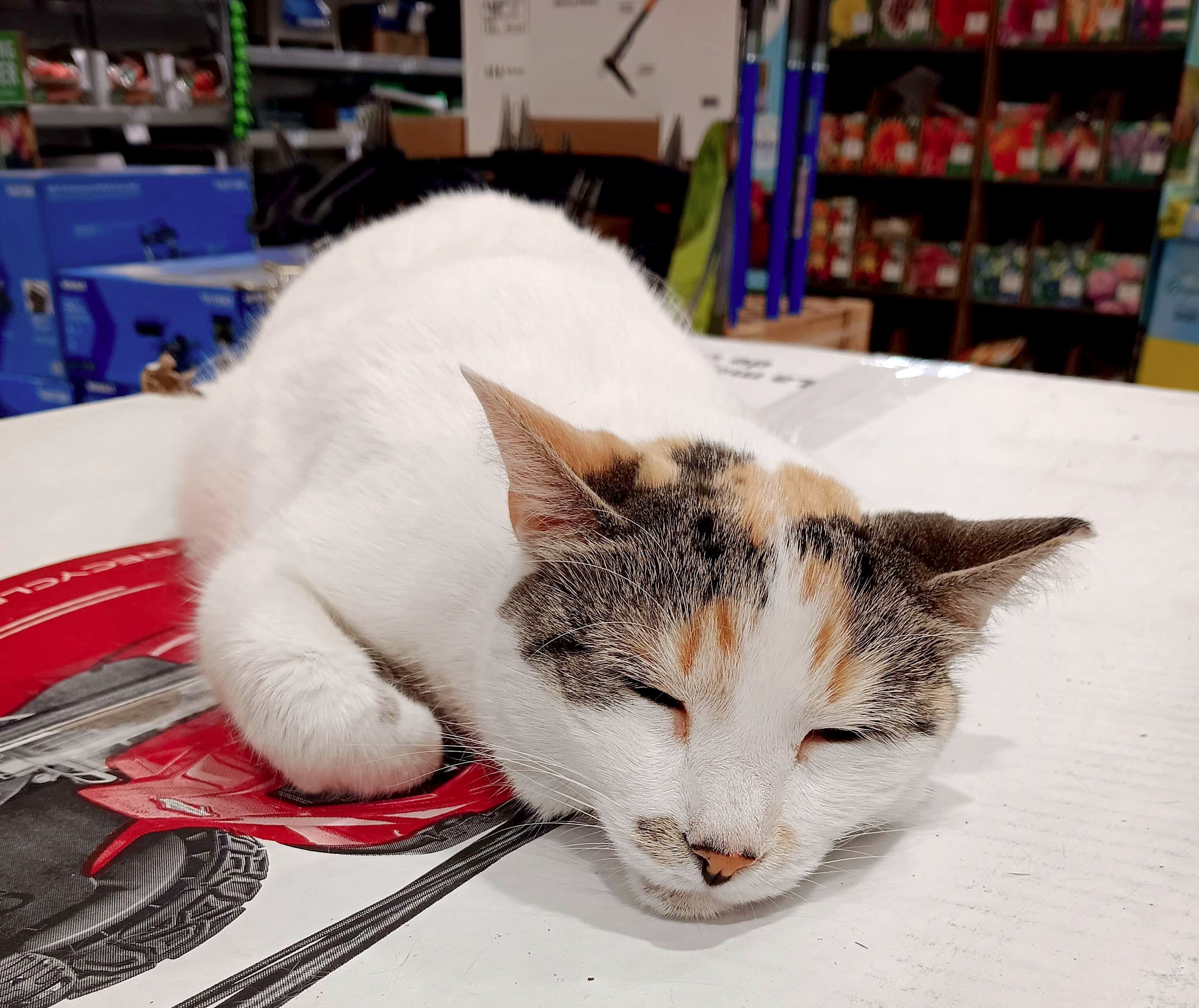
- Francine in May 2025
- Species: Felis catus
- Sex: Female
- Years active: 2017–
- Residence: Lowes #1037, Broad Street, Richmond, Virginia
- Appearance: Shorthair

Francine, also known as the "Lowe's Cat," is a cat that lives at Lowe's #1037 on Broad Street in Richmond, Virginia. She disappeared in September 2025, but later was returned to the store. She has been described as a "beacon of the community."

She is a calico cat with black and brown patches of fur by her ears, is short-haired, and has been described as "very friendly, [...] calm," and "serene," as well as very welcoming to all who wanted to pet her and take photographs.

== Life ==
=== Entry into the store ===
She first entered the store's Lawn and Garden area in 2017. She initially sustained herself on mice and refused to let humans near her, but after employees noticed that she looked thin, they started to feed her. She formed an especially close bond with one employee and became outwardly friendly after about 18 months. Despite being free to leave, Francine remained at the store ever since, until her disappearance in September 2025.

=== Life at the store ===
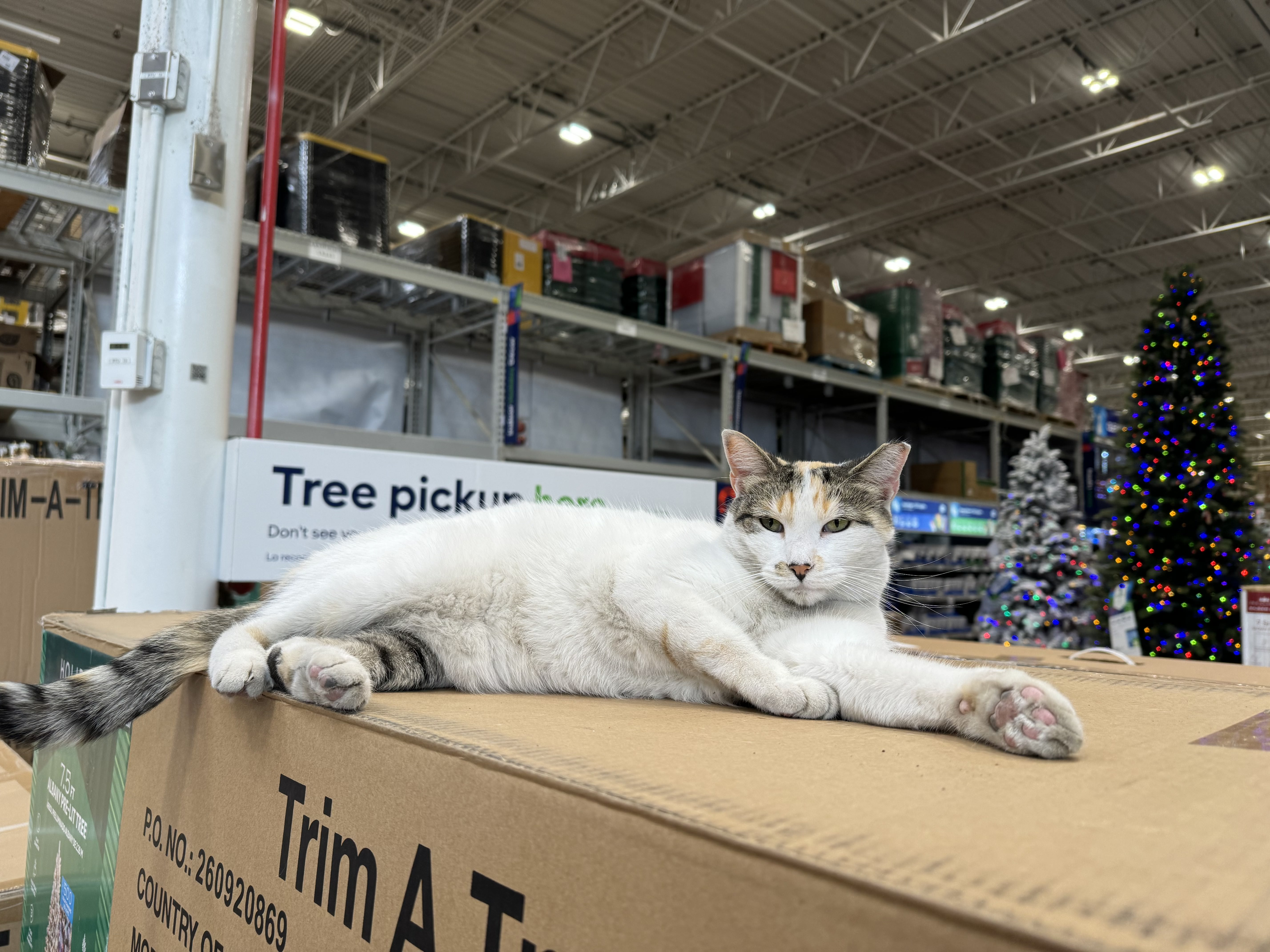
Francine lounging on boxes.

The store and its associates take care of her food, water, and veterinary needs, with assistance from the community. Francine has a microchip that identifies her home as the Lowe's. Her favorite spot in the store is the stack of boxes between the registers and Lawn & Garden section.

=== Fame ===
While Lowe's initially did not approve of her presence, they eventually embraced her with a YouTube video. She is especially popular on the r/rva subreddit. She has been described as one of Richmond's most famous residents, and as a mascot for the city.

Many customers visit the store solely to visit Francine, or bypass nearer stores in favor of #1037 because of her. One employee said that the store perhaps receives more visits from people looking to see her than actual customers.

Some have tried to remove her from the store.

Monopoly included a Community Chest Card, directing the player to "Visit the Lowe's Cat Francine," in its official Richmond edition of the game, and a print of the cat, made by a local artist, hangs in the store.

The cat gained increased notoriety in 2024 when she was featured in a YouTube video.

During the 2024 Richmond mayoral election, signs popped up around the city saying "Elect Francine for whatever she wants." The cat received eight votes.

She won RVA's Most Unlikely Icon of 2024, as presented by Style Weekly.

== Disappearance ==
=== Initial events ===
Francine was last seen on September 17, 2025. Reports indicated that, on September 18, she got into a truck bound for a Lowe's distribution center in Garysburg, North Carolina. On 20 September, staff there opened the doors, saw a cat, and then closed the doors to prevent her from escaping while they called the SPCA to come take it. However, an employee uninformed of the plan then opened the doors, allowing her to escape. At the time, it was not confirmed if the cat in the trailer was indeed Francine.

=== Search ===
Two local residents who enjoyed seeing Francine at the Lowe's created an Instagram account, @WheresFrancine, (Note: Their stylization.) which, within a few hours, had 400,000 views. It quickly garnered 5,000 followers, later 10,000, and helped spread awareness of and information on the search. An online spreadsheet was also coordinated by the group to aid in collaboration for the search effort. People behind the search called themselves Task Force Francine.

The distribution center coordinated with the search and asked the public not to call unless it was with information of her whereabouts. The SPCA planned to send staff with traps if permission from the distribution center was received. On the evening of Sunday, September 28, WheresFrancine announced that a search party was going to be sent on the morning of Monday, September 29. Eight volunteers went, along with two Richmond SPCA workers. They hung pictures, searched the woods for her, and talked with locals. While Lowe's denied them access to the facility due to safety concerns, they said that they brought in experts from a local animal shelter to aid in the search, thanked people for keeping an eye out and their outpouring of support, and urged people to call the store directly if they had information. Northampton County animal control officers were allowed access to the facility and planned to set traps and provide updates to the Instagram account; they were put in charge of the search, with help from the task force. They set humane traps to help look for her. The task force brought a blanket favored by her and her cat carrier to help with the search.

A $2,000 reward was offered for anyone who helped facilitate Francine's return by SOS Cats RVA, a local organization that engages in Trap, Neuter, and Return work. Fliers promoting the reward were placed around the facility. Thermal drones were brought in to help with the search, and asset protection staff monitored the network of 246 existing ones at the facility. Participating organizations in the search included Northampton County Animal Shelter, Thermal Bird, Carmen Brothers Professional Pet Trappers, Richmond SPCA, Richmond Animal Care and Control, SOS Cats RVA, and Best Friends.

=== Reactions ===
News of her disappearance dominated r/rva over the weekend of September 27.

A medium offered her services. Gwar, a local heavy metal band, participated in the search.

Her search was compared to the search for Bagel the Beagle. One of the people behind the Instagram account praised the outpouring of support received for the cause and said that it demonstrated that Richmond was a "great, but weird place to live," while a Richmond SPCA official said that the response was "encouraging and inspiring," demonstrating the community's compassion towards animals in need. Axios Richmond said that Richmond had not been this unified since VCU made it to the Final Four in 2011, and noted that a Reddit commenter said that "this is the biggest emergency in Richmond since the water system failure."

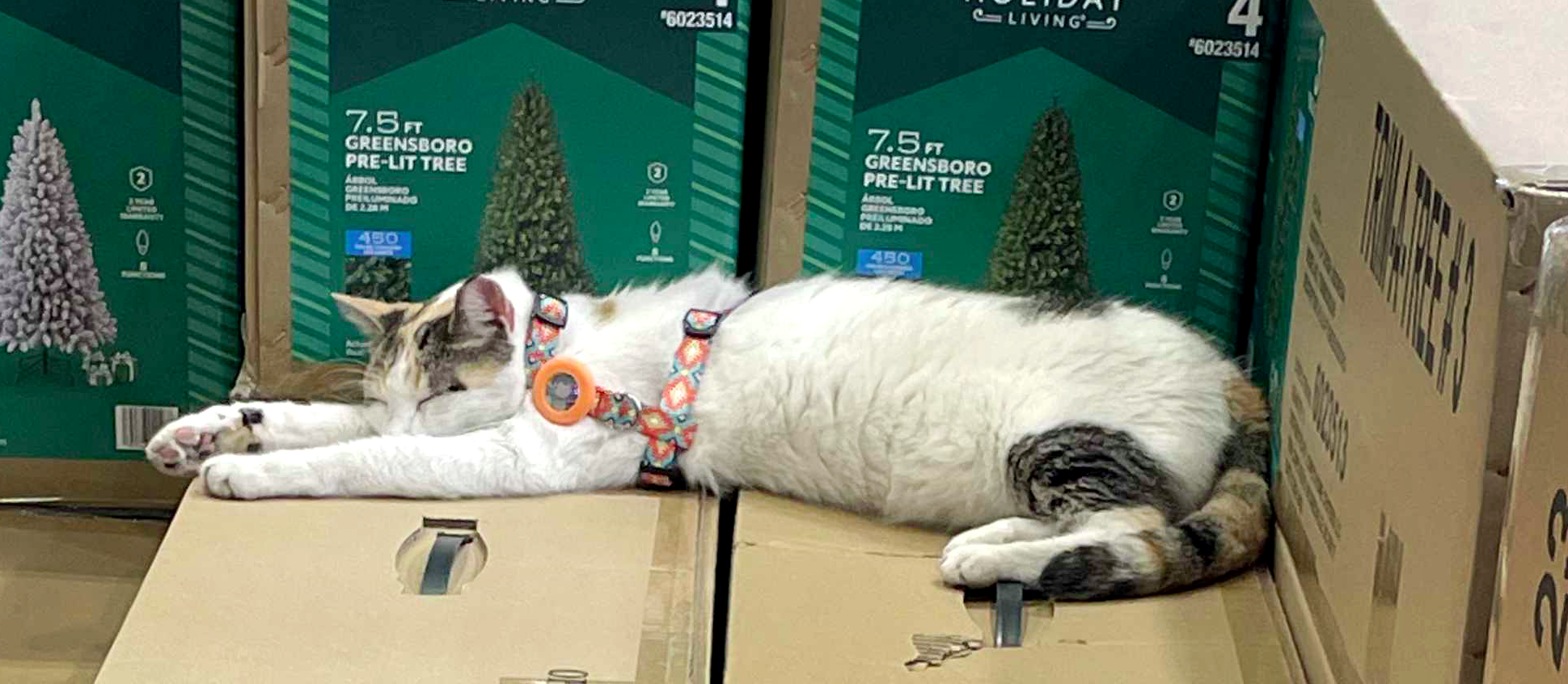
After her return, Francine was given a harness and AirTag to prevent future incidents.

=== Return ===
Employees at the distribution center reported sightings of a cat after the search effort commenced.

On the evening of Sunday, October 4th, a camera spotted her near the facility. Immediately, a small team was gathered to travel to the facility; they brought her favorite food and dish, hoping that the familiar rattle might draw her out. Additional cameras and seven additional humane traps were installed, and a maintenance associate volunteered to check each every night. That evening, Francine triggered one of the traps and was found on Sunday morning. At 4am on the morning of Monday, October 6th, two Lowe's employees drove down to Garysburg to pick her up.

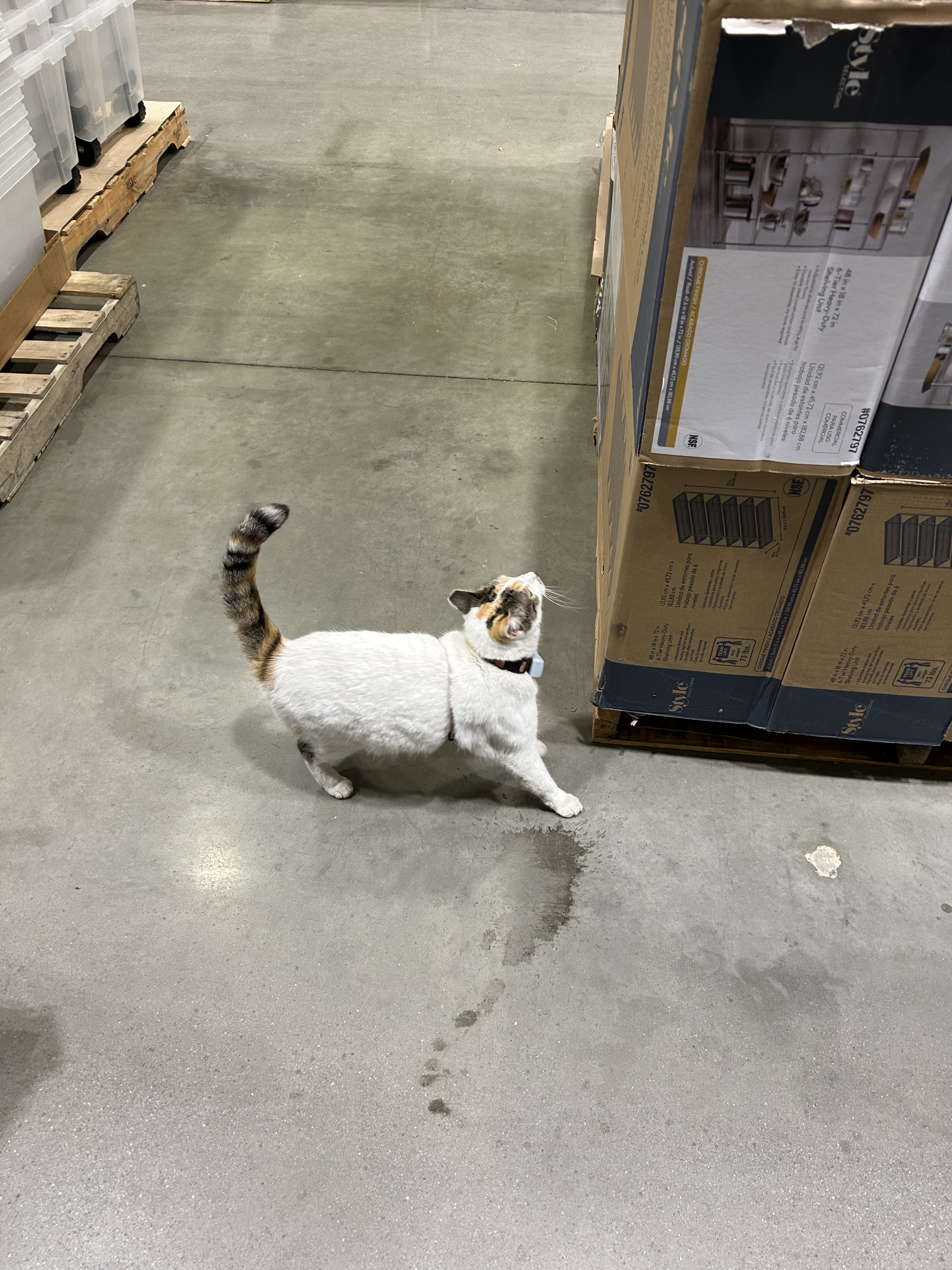
Francine jumping onto a box some months after her return.

The Richmond SPCA waived all adoption fees on October 6-7 in honor of her return.

She quickly returned to her normal routine, albeit with more affection from locals; a harness and new AirTag were placed on her.

=== Francine Fest ===
Coordinators of the search effort held a "Francine Fest" to celebrate her return, urging people to not overwhelm the Lowe's store on Monday. The event was held on the evening of Wednesday, October 8th, at Main Line Brewery and featured live musicians, food trucks, a raffle, and a pet supply drive. To avoid overwhelming her, the cat was not to be present at the celebration.

=== General Assembly recognition ===
The Virginia General Assembly passed a resolution, patroned by multiple Richmond-area legislators, commending Task Force Francine for their multistate rescue efforts.
