= Francina Louise Schot =

Dutch painter (1816–1894)

Francina Louise Schot (19 December 1816, in Rotterdam – 13 April 1894, in Schaerbeek) was a Dutch painter, best remembered for her floral, still life, and portrait paintings. A member of the Rijksakademie van beeldende kunsten, her work are now part of the collections of the Museum Rotterdam.
