= Francine Justa =

American activist (1942–2016)

Francine Cyvia Justa (1942–2016) was an activist and advocate for affordable housing in New York City.

== Early life ==
Justa was born in Richmond, Virginia in 1942. Her father abandoned the family during her childhood, and she was raised solely by her mother. They relocated to Miami Beach when Justa was a junior in high school, and she went on to enroll at the University of Florida at Gainesville. However, her mother suffered a nervous breakdown, necessitating a move north to Brooklyn, New York, where Justa's mother's only relative, her brother Howard, lived. Justa's mother was institutionalized and Justa moved in with her uncle Howard and found work at a department store. She remained in New York for the rest of her life.

== Education and professional life ==
Justa completed her BA at Hunter College in 1972, graduating summa cum laude. In September 1976 she completed her MA in Environmental Psychology at the CUNY Graduate from Center, and then continued on to get her doctorate, which she completed in 1984. Her doctoral work examined connections between housing issues and policy and development of community organizations. She also taught at Queens College as an adjunct professor while completing her dissertation.

In 1973, Justa started a block association for her block of Carroll Street in Park Slope. The Carroll Street Block Association was incorporated in 1974 with Justa as its first president, a position that she held for three years. The Carroll Street Block Association was a member of the United Block Associations (UBA) of Park Slope, of which group Justa also served as secretary.

In 1975, Justa studied the Little Italy Restoration Association as part of her graduate coursework, and it helped her to "recognize and understand the connection between not-for-profit groups and funding from city, state, federal and private sources." This work and the insights that stemmed from it eventually led to her dissertation, "Effects of Housing Abandonment, Resettlement Processes, and Displacement on the Evolution of Voluntary Community Organizations in Park Slope, Brooklyn, New York," completed in 1984.

In 1976, after the release of a report by the New York Public Interest Research Group titled "Take the Money and Run: Redlining in Brooklyn," Justa and other concerned community members from the UBA started the group United Blocks Against Investment Discrimination (AID). AID was disbanded after the passage of the Community Reinvestment Act (CRA).

Also in 1976, Justa joined other community members in forming the Fifth Avenue Neighborhood Committee, later simply the Fifth Avenue Committee (FAC). FAC was incorporated in 1978 with Justa as its first president. The organization has been very successful and continues to thrive today. At FAC's 20th anniversary celebrations in 1998, Justa's early leadership was lauded: "She knew the challenges of trying to improve and redevelop a community like lower Park Slope while simultaneously preventing displacement and creating opportunity for low- and moderate-income residents. Those early strategy sessions and years of hard work laid the foundation for the next twenty years."

In the early 1980s, Justa was hired as executive director at the Neighborhood Housing Services (NHS) office in the Kensington/Windsor Terrace area of Brooklyn, a division of the NHS of New York City. NHS is a nonprofit organization dedicated to community revitalization with a board of directors composed of community residents, supported by a national umbrella organization, NeighborWorks. In 1986, Justa became the executive director of the NHS of NYC, overseeing the organization's six offices across the city's five boroughs. At the time the organization was floundering with only 20 people on staff. Under Justa's leadership, the organization was able to bounce back and expand, employing over 100 people by her retirement in 2003.

Justa won many accolades and honors for her accomplishments with NHS. In 1990, Brooklyn Borough President Howard Golden chose her as one of the "outstanding women of Brooklyn". In June 1996, she was awarded the NHSEF Neighborhood Vision Award. In 1995, she met Bill Clinton at the National Homeownership Ceremony. In 2001, she was accepted into the yearlong James A. Johnson Community Fellows Program of the Fannie Mae Foundation. In 2003, Justa was awarded a Lifetime Achievement Award and met keynote speaker Hillary Clinton at the National Housing Conference. After her retirement, NHS named an award in Justa's honor.

In 2004, Justa was appointed to the Board of Directors of the New York State Banking Department, a position she held until 2007, when her advancing Parkinson's disease made it impossible for her to continue working.

Justa was also active on the boards of many private and public corporations, including the Affordable Housing Advisory Council for the Federal Loan Home Bank, the Association of Neighborhood Housing Development, the Board of Advisors for the New York Housing Policy Resources Project of the Community Training and Resource Center, the National Insurance Task Force, the Neighborhood Reinvestment Corporation Campaign for Homeownership, and Women in Housing and Finance, as well as advisory and community boards for several commercial banks.

== Writing and philosophy ==
In addition to her dissertation, Justa wrote a number of additional articles, essays, and letters on the subject of urban revitalization and community activism. For example, in relation to her activities with the Fifth Avenue Committee, Justa wrote an article for a local newspaper The Phoenix in 1978 titled "Saving Our City Shouldn't Be This Hard". In it, she lambasts the city officials and bureaucracy that prevented community residents from making meaningful change in their neighborhood.

According to her husband Moe Kornbluth, "there was a goodness and altruism that encompassed all that Fran did" and "she felt that all people should be treated fairly, justly, equitably, and sympathetically." This is evident in words that she wrote in January 1985:

I know now that … the haves and the have-nots are inextricably intertwined … New York City is becoming increasingly polarized … That's unfortunate we say but what has that to do with us? Everything.

In a January 1985 statement, she wrote about the connections between economic inequality and social polarization, warning that responses to crime risk disproportionately affecting communities based on race, language, and religion.

== Personal life ==
Justa married her first husband on September 19, 1962. They divorced in 1966. On June 24, 1971, Justa married Morris (Moe) Kornbluth. The couple at first lived in Manhattan, but eventually moved to Park Slope, Brooklyn. They had to seek the help of the Park Slope Civic Council in order to obtain a mortgage in a neighborhood that was at that time labeled "declining" and suffering from redlining. In 1976, Justa gave birth to her and Kornbluth's only child, a daughter named Sarah. In December 1997, Justa was diagnosed with Parkinson's disease, the complications of which led to her death in 2016.
