= Francine G. McNairy =

American academic administrator

13th President of Millersville University of Pennsylvania
- In office March 2003 – January 26, 2013
- Preceded by: Joseph Caputo
- Succeeded by: John M. Anderson

Personal details
- Education: University of Pittsburgh
- Alma mater: Clarion University; West Chester University; Millersville University of Pennsylvania

Francine Gladys McNairy is an American academic administrator who served as the thirteenth president of Millersville University of Pennsylvania from 2003 to 2013. McNairy was the first African American woman to head one of Pennsylvania’s 14 state-owned universities.

== Life ==
McNairy earned a bachelor's degree sociology in 1968, a master's degree in social work in 1970, and a Ph.D. in speech rhetoric/communication with emphasis on interpersonal and small group communication from the University of Pittsburgh in 1978. Her dissertation was titled, Black Students' and White Faculty Members' Perceptions of Black Students' Classroom Communication.

In 1973, McNairy became an assistant professor at Clarion University. She was promoted to dean of academic support services and assistant to the vice president for academic affairs. For three years, McNairy served as the associate provost and interim social equity director at the West Chester University. In August 1994, she joined Millersville University of Pennsylvania as its provost and vice president of academic affairs. During the fall 1997 semester, she was the acting president while Joseph Caputo was on sabbatical. She succeeded Caputo in March 2003 as the thirteenth president. She was the first African American and woman in the role. She stepped down on January 26, 2013 and announced her retirement. She was succeeded by John M. Anderson.
