= Richmond SPCA =

Animal shelter in Virginia, US

The Richmond SPCA is an independent non-profit animal shelter in Richmond, Virginia, founded in 1891.

== History ==
The organization was formed in 1891 by Nellie Palmer and W. Ben Palmer, a Confederate Civil War soldier in the 43rd Battalion, Virginia Cavalry, at their 315 E. Grace Street home. This group was known for their "deep devotion to their horses", leading her husband to be an activist against animal abuse as well. Nellie Palmer was the only woman who was involved in the founding of the shelter.

After the Civil War, people’s concerns were raised regarding animal abuse and cruelty. In the late 19th century organizations throughout the United States began to arise in the effort to protect animals. The Palmers recruited influential leaders to assist them in the creation of this organization such as Joseph Bryan, founder of the Richmond Times-Dispatch. The SPCA in Richmond struggled with its finances, but Nellie Palmer's aunt, Louisa Nalle, left her Richmond estate to Palmer upon her death. Not only did the Palmers have a new location for their shelter but, a sum of $24,000 was left to the SPCA that could be used to advocate for animal protection.

In the 20th century, leadership of the Richmond SPCA was taken by Ellen Glasgow, a women's activist and Pulitzer Prize winner. Glasgow had joined the organization the year after it formed at age 19. She became vice president of the Richmond SPCA in 1911. At this time, much of the Society's work involved the mistreatment of working animals, such as horses and mules. Drivers who failed to care for their animals could be warned or prosecuted in the city Police Court or in the county magistrates' courts.

Ellen Glasgow highlighted the idea of "Anthropomorphic pomposity", an idea that humans are superior to animals. Glasgow was the president of the Richmond SPCA's board and the enforcer of the first shelter to be created in 1924 for this organization. For two decades Glasgow was president of the board and recruited other influential Richmonders, Douglas Southall Freeman and James Branch Cabell. Glasgow died in 1945.

In 1979, the Richmond SPCA began programs to address the link between animal and human abuse.

In the 60s and 70s humane societies began to kill animals, going against the mission of animal shelters. Ed Duvin wrote an article named "in the Name of Mercy" in 1989 about euthanasia at animal shelters. He stated that "is the dark secret that it is, in part, little more than a vast killing machine." He highlighted how billions of dollars was spent but this never formed a national association that was effective in giving proper treatment to the shelter animals. This article was a catalyst for animal treatment in shelters. Shelters began spaying and neutering animals and promoting adoption. Places started changing to "no-kill" which led to saving millions of cats and dogs lives. The San Francisco SPCA was the first to move to nonkill and the Richmond SPCA was the first to successfully replicate it.

In 2002, the Richmond SPCA switched to an appointment-based relinquishment system. In 2013, the Richmond SPCA was among SPCA shelters across the country targeted by PETA with undercover video to claim the no-kill shelters send too many animals to local pounds that euthanize.

The shelter has taken in animals affected by hurricanes. After Hurricane Ida in summer of 2021, the shelter rescued 20 cats and 6 dogs from Louisiana. In 2020, photographer Kristen Murray created a book, Tails of the River City, to raise funds for the Richmond SPCA.

== About ==
The Richmond SPCA is a non-kill animal shelter founded in 1891. They are a "non-profit, non-kill (as of January 2002) humane organization dedicated to the principle that every life is precious." ("Richmond SPCA") The organization has been credited with the dropping numbers of dog euthanasia numbers in Virginia.

The founder is Nellie Palmer and currently operated by Robin Starr. Previous CEO of the Richmond SPCA, Robin Starr was "one of the first to put no-kill principles into practice in a major American city", said Wayne Pacelle, former CEO of the Humane Society of the United States. The shelter is located in the capital of Virginia on Hermitage Road. This shelter consists of cats and dogs that have been transferred to the location or "surrendered" by their families. 70 percent of the cats and dogs that come to the Richmond SPCA are transferred from other pounds and shelters while 30 percent are surrendered to the SPCA by their families ("Richmond SPCA").

The Richmond SPCA does not accept stray pets because "the owners who have lost a pet need a central location to find him, and that is their local municipal shelter. ("Richmond SPCA")" Also, cage space is limited, and the Richmond SPCA wishes to save the largest number of lives possible, but strays must be held at the shelter for a period of time where they cannot be adopted. When stray animals are brought to the Richmond SPCA, "the good Samaritans who found him are directed to the appropriate animal control facility." ("Richmond SPCA") If an owner is searching for their pet, there is a mandatory period of time called a "stray period" which, under state law, requires the shelter to hold that animal there. The owner then has a chance to find the pet at a government shelter. As the "stray period" concludes the Richmond SPCA can then transfer the pet to their location to prevent the animal from death and provide proper care. Transfer agreements are put in place with the Richmond SPCA and government shelters and this "policy exists to give stray pets the best chance of being reunited with their families." ("Richmond SPCA").

The Richmond SPCA has a strict policy for relinquishing pets. Relinquishing pets, also known as surrendering, is when a pet owner decides to sign over their legal rights as a pet owner, pay a fee, and leave their pet with an animal shelter. Staff can also help the owners resolve behavioral issues, get the pet fully inoculated, spayed, or neutered so as to perhaps facilitate the family's ability to keep their pet or find the animal new home on their own.

The Richmond SPCA is involved with a program called Maddie's Fund, their "mission is to revolutionize the status and well-being of companion animals." ("Alternatives to Relinquishment at the Richmond SPCA") Maddie is the dog of Dave and Cheryl (the creators of the Fund) who inspired them to "give generously and to help save homeless pets in desperate need of love and care." This program finds alternatives to relinquishment of pets.

The Richmond SPCA offers the "Clinic for Compassionate Care, which provides low-cost, full-service veterinary care to pets of income-qualified guardians as well as some other eligible groups." ("Richmond SPCA"). The clinic also provides "treatment for pets in the custody of area municipal pounds and shelters, pets adopted from the Richmond SPCA, pets of former Wellness Clinic clients, pets of Richmond SPCA employees and pets referred to the clinic by other veterinarians." ("Richmond SPCA").

== Programs ==
The Richmond SPCA is partners with Pets for Patriots which is a program designed for military veterans to adopt a pet. The Seniors for Seniors program, created by Carol Young Godin, assists in matching senior dogs and cats with senior citizens over the age of sixty.

Along with programs, the Richmond SPCA also provides owners and their pets with resources to promote responsible ownership. The Pet Behavior Hotline is one of the resources that owners can utilize to speak to trainers as they will assist in solving pet behavior issues. The Richmond SPCA also provides the public with a guide to pet-friendly housing and other locations such as stores, restaurants, hotels, and parks in Richmond.

== Events ==
Supper Club, beginning in January 2010, is an event where individuals who participate attend a local restaurant in Richmond that is a participant in the event. 15% of the proceeds from the restaurant obtained the night of the Supper Club event benefit the Richmond SPCA.

The Richmond SPCA annually hosts the Fur Ball which is a black-tie event for people and their pets to attend. Proceeds from the Fur Ball go into the "Cinderella Fund". The Cinderella Fund is the pot of money that helps fund surgeries and veterinary care for the animals within the shelter. In 2021, the Fur Ball was awarded "Best Charity Event" by the Richmond Times-Dispatch.

The annual Dog Jog event is a 5k run where proceeds benefit the Richmond SPCA and the Susan M. Markel Veterinary Hospital. Due to COVID-19, participants for the 19th annual Dog Jog for the year 2021, were given the option to participate virtually by running their own course using the RaceJoy App.

The Richmond SPCA has made efforts to help clear the shelter at certain times by taking away the adoption fees in support of Clear the Shelters for one day. In 2019, the shelter also had an adoption special to help with Clear the Shelters where individuals or families could adopt two cats for the price of one.

== Susan M. Markel Veterinary Hospital ==
The Susan M. Markel Veterinary Hospital is a non-emergent veterinary hospital that is designed to provide affordable veterinary care to those who qualify. This veterinary hospital caters to low-income pet owners and animals that have been adopted from the Richmond SPCA.

The Richmond SPCA raised $10.5 million during the Campaign for Compassionate Care which gave the green light to begin building the Susan M. Markel Veterinary Hospital in 2015. What was once Lakeside Appliance, is now the veterinary hospital. Susan M. Markel Veterinary Hospital was built next to the Richmond SPCA in May 2015. The animal hospital was complete and open for business in January 2016. The veterinary hospital opened during the Richmond SPCA's 125th anniversary. This is the first veterinary hospital in Virginia to be run by a nonprofit "on a charitable basis."

The services that the Susan M. Markel Veterinary Hospital has "include general and preventive health care, dentistry, routine surgery, geriatric care, dietary management, in-house laboratory and radiology services, microchipping, and puppy and kitten care." In April 2021, the hospital received a $10,000 grant from Petco love that helped them provide veterinary care to more animals at an affordable price.
