= Timmerhuis =

Building complex in Rotterdam

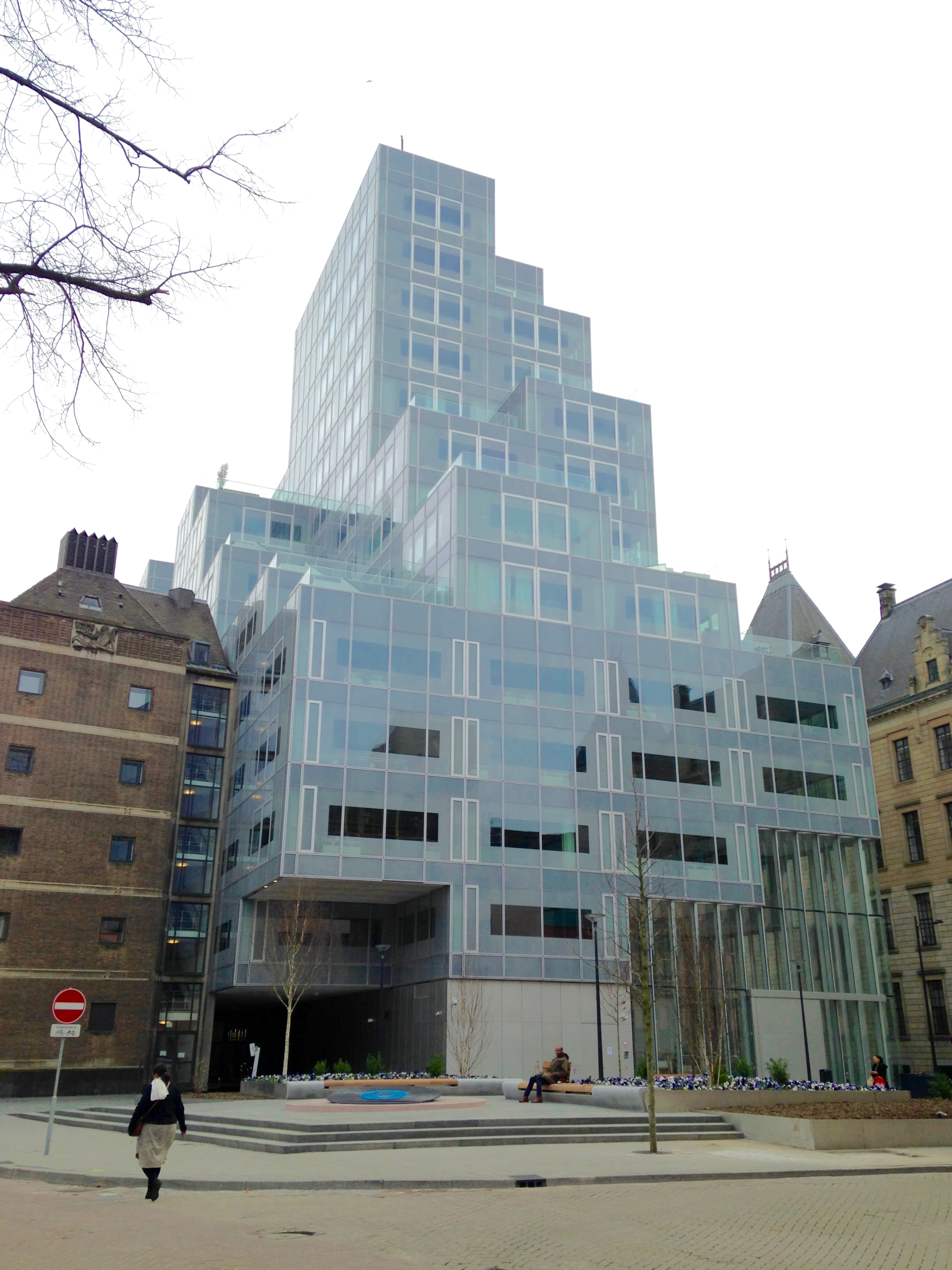
- Timmerhuis - Rotterdam - from corner Raamplein-Haagseveer
- Interactive map of the Timmerhuis area

General information
- Type: Offices, Retail, Residential
- Architectural style: Wederopbouwarchitectuur, Modernist
- Location: Stadsdriehoek, Rotterdam, Netherlands
- Coordinates: 51°55′21″N 4°28′52″E
- Construction started: 2011
- Completed: 2015
- Opened: December 11, 2015
- Cost: €100 million

Height
- Height: 60 m (197 ft)

Technical details
- Floor count: 14 (North Tower); 11 (South Tower)

Design and construction
- Architect: OMA

The Timmerhuis (formerly Stadstimmerhuis) is a building complex in the Stadsdriehoek district in the center of Rotterdam. The building is a combination of post-World War II reconstruction architecture by municipal architect J.R.A. Koops and contemporary architecture by the Office for Metropolitan Architecture (OMA).

== History ==
A Stadstimmerhuis (translated literally: "city carpentry house") is the office of the municipal service that deals with building and construction. It is named after the profession of civil carpenter, and later civil architect or master builder. An earlier Stadstimmerhuis in Rotterdam was located on the Haringvliet, but was destroyed in the Second World War during the German bombing of Rotterdam in World War II. Then, from the early 1940s to 1953, the Stadstimmerhuis was located as an emergency building near the cattle market, between the Warande and the Goudse Rijweg, on the Boezemweg. This emergency building was still in use after 1953. In 1947, municipal architect J.R.A. Koops designed the new Stadstimmerhuis, originally conceived as an elongated building on the Haagseveer with four wings at right angles to each other. Ultimately, only one of the four wings was realized: the one on the Meent. In this way, an L-shaped office building was created on the Meent and the Haagseveer. Its construction took place between 1950 and 1953; it was one of the first larger buildings in the empty center of Rotterdam to be erected after the bombing.

The building was completed in 1953 and housed the Department of Municipal Works and four technical departments. The reconstruction of Rotterdam would be led from this place.

== Architecture ==
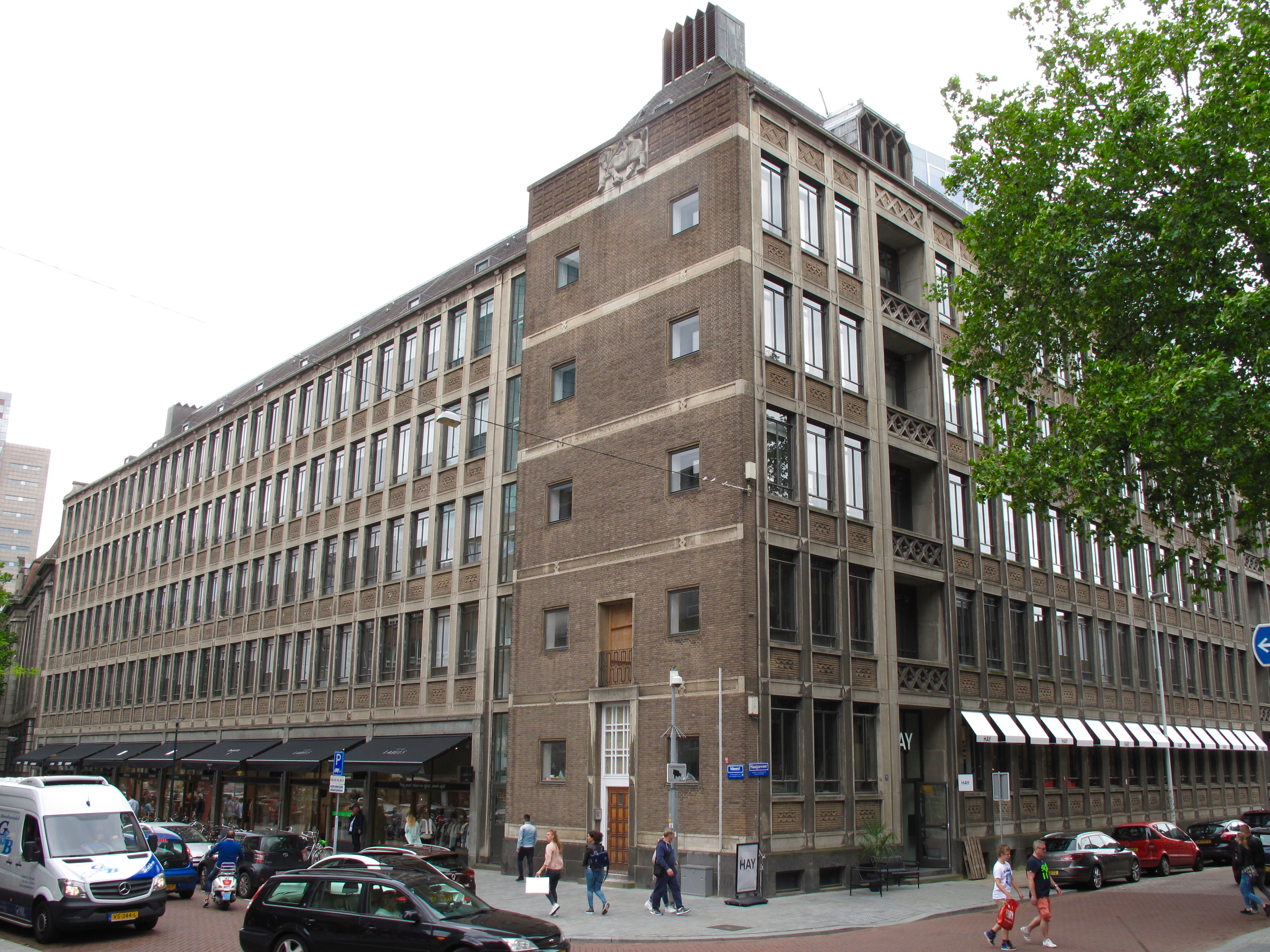
Stadstimmerhuis at the corner of Meent and Haagseveer

Koops' original Stadstimmerhuis is a sleek building, made of concrete with brick and stone details. It features gabled roofs and chimneys, giving it a traditionalist look, but it was also considered progressive, due to the concrete skeleton, flexible ventilation system and self-service elevators. Partition walls in the office spaces are movable. On the Meent there is a row of steel and glass shop fronts, and the gable ends have granite reliefs. There is also a bronze plaque in honor of engineer Cornelis van Traa - city architect of the reconstruction between 1940 and 1964 - after a design by Cor van Kralingen.

In 2000, the building received the status of a municipal heritage monument and has been extensively restored.

== Expansion ==
An extension of the Stadstimmerhuis, contained within the L-shape, designed by Ronald Gill in the 1970s, was demolished in 2011. In 2009, a call for proposals was issued to design a new wing, in which five architectural firms took part (Claus and Kaan, Mecanoo, Meyer and Van Schooten, OMA and SeARCH). OMA's design was selected by a professional jury and is described as 'a shapeless pile of pixels', 'a building like a kind of cloud'. It is a set of white glass cubes, cantilevered over a steel construction on two legs.

The new complex, the Timmerhuis, opened on December 11, 2015. It contains offices, 91 apartments, an underground parking garage and houses Museum Rotterdam. Museum Rotterdam self-proclaims to be "The most Rotterdam museum in the world," connecting the past, present and future.

The old L-shaped building has been integrated into it. The extension comprises two towers, consisting of step-shaped, receding residential floors with roof terraces. On the ground floor, between the towers, is an atrium with a publicly accessible pedestrian passage (Halvemaanpassage) that connects Haagseveer with Rodezand.

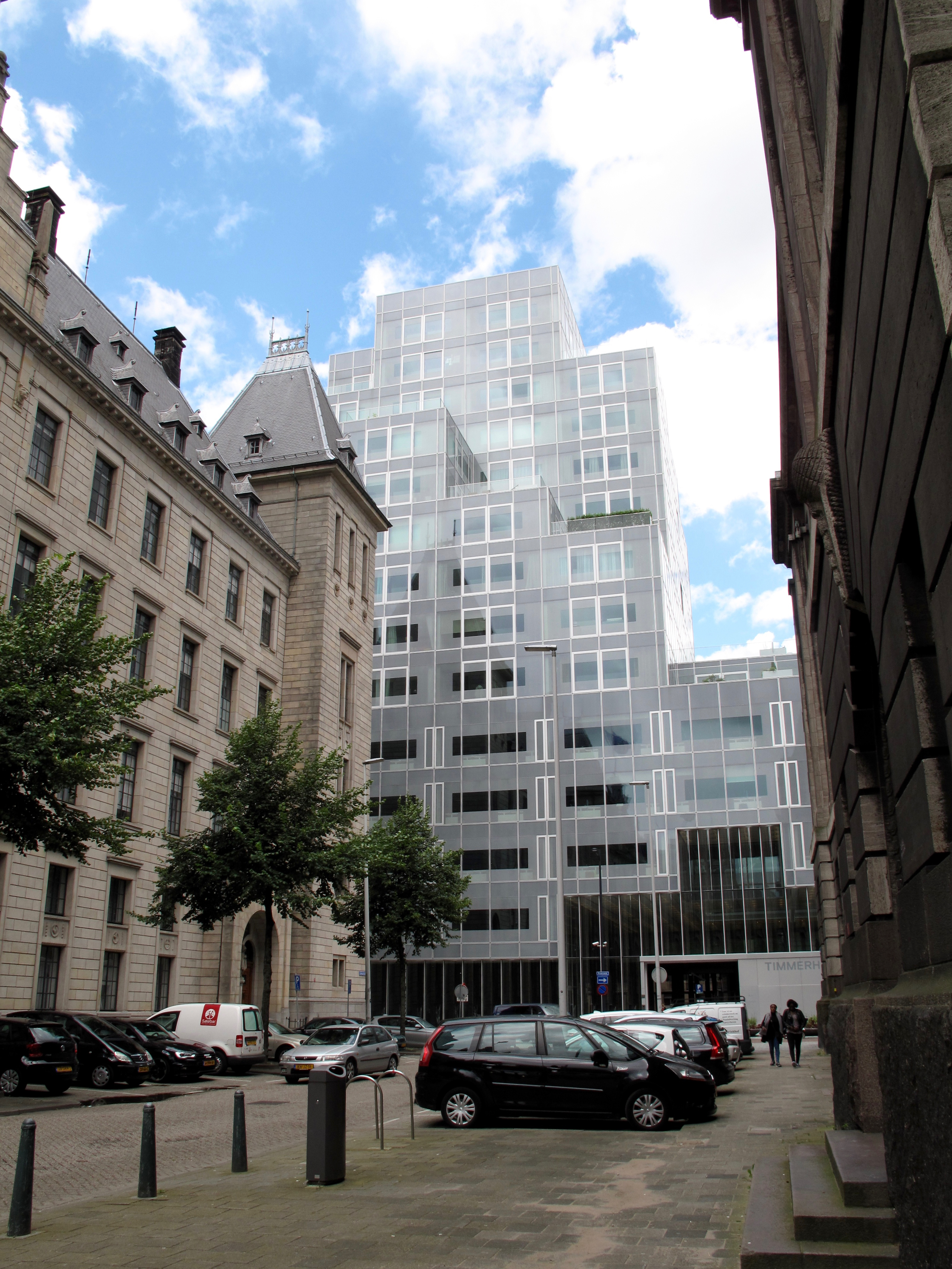
North tower from Stadhuisstraat

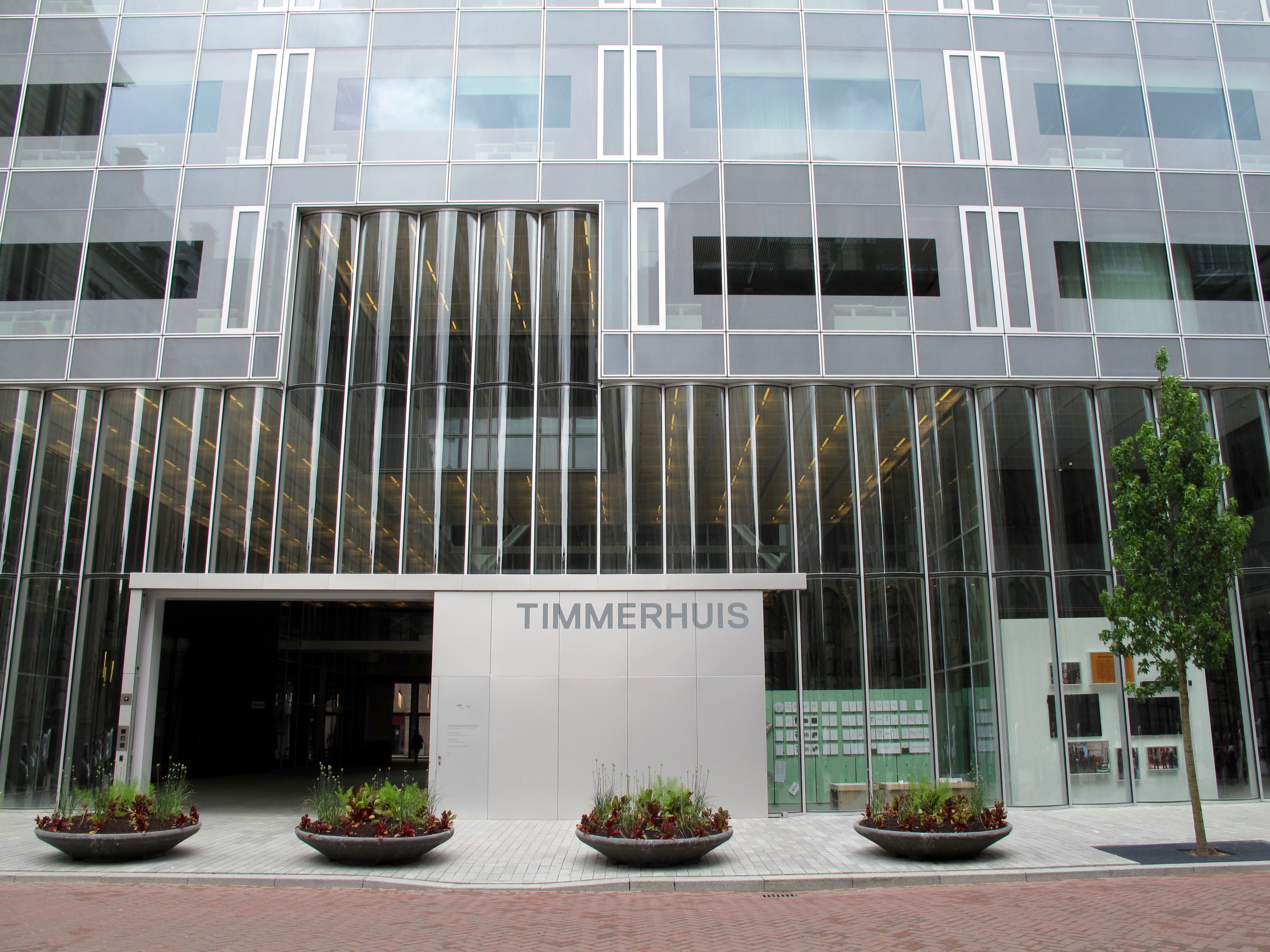
Facade on Rodezand with access to the Halvemaanpassage

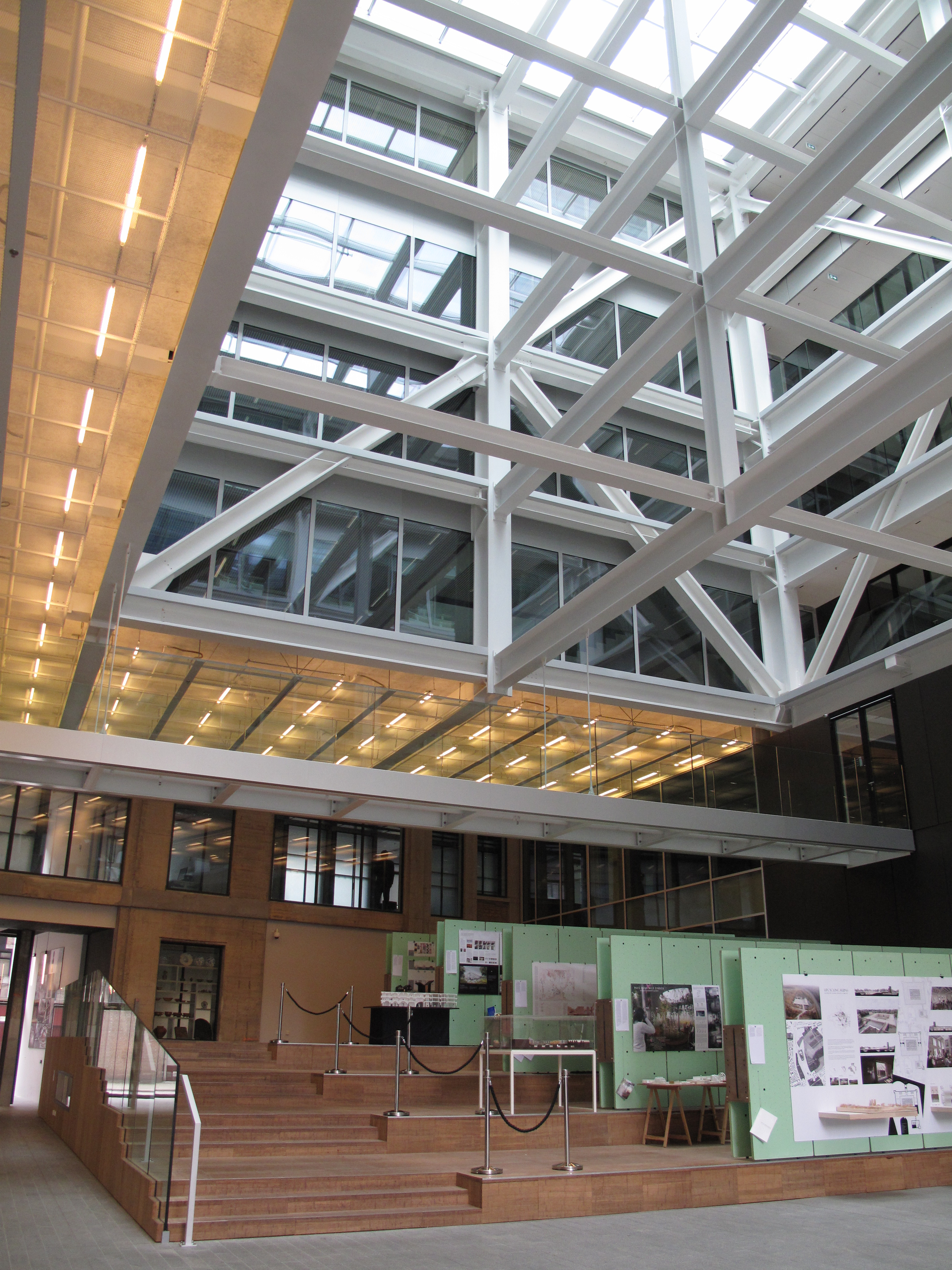
Atrium and public passage with steel construction between the two towers

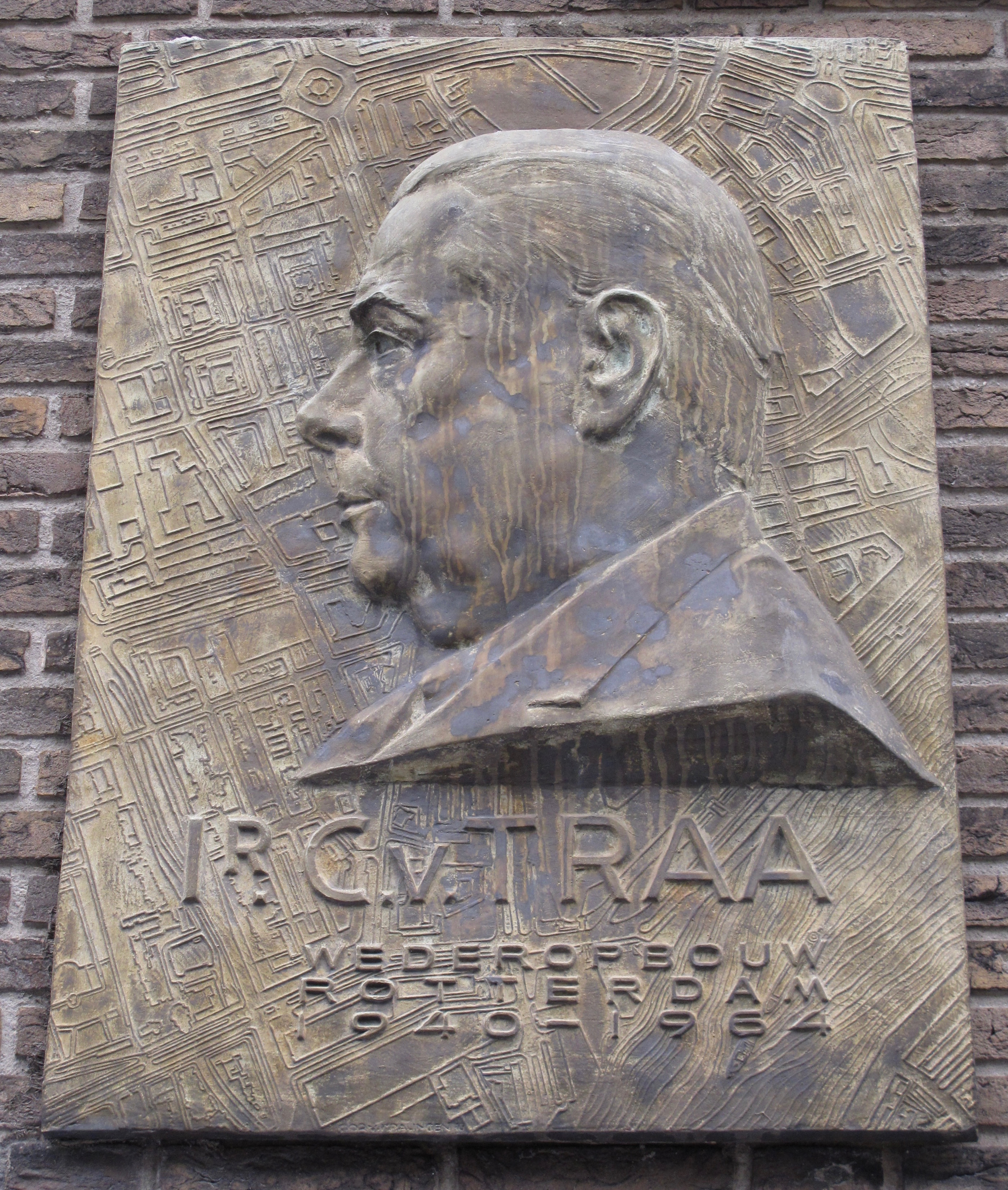
Bronze plaque in honor of engineer Cornelis van Traa

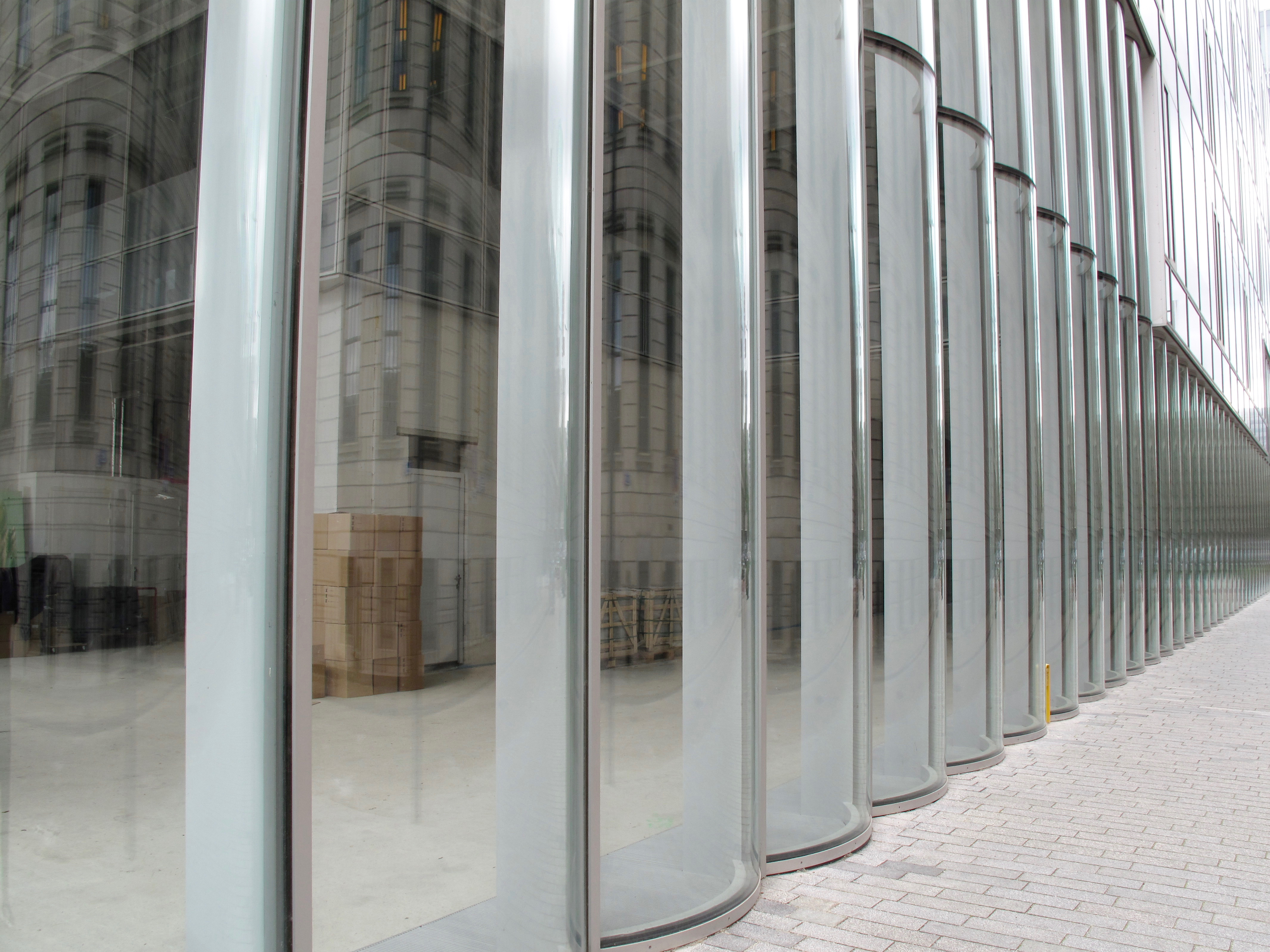
Detail of facade with curved glass
