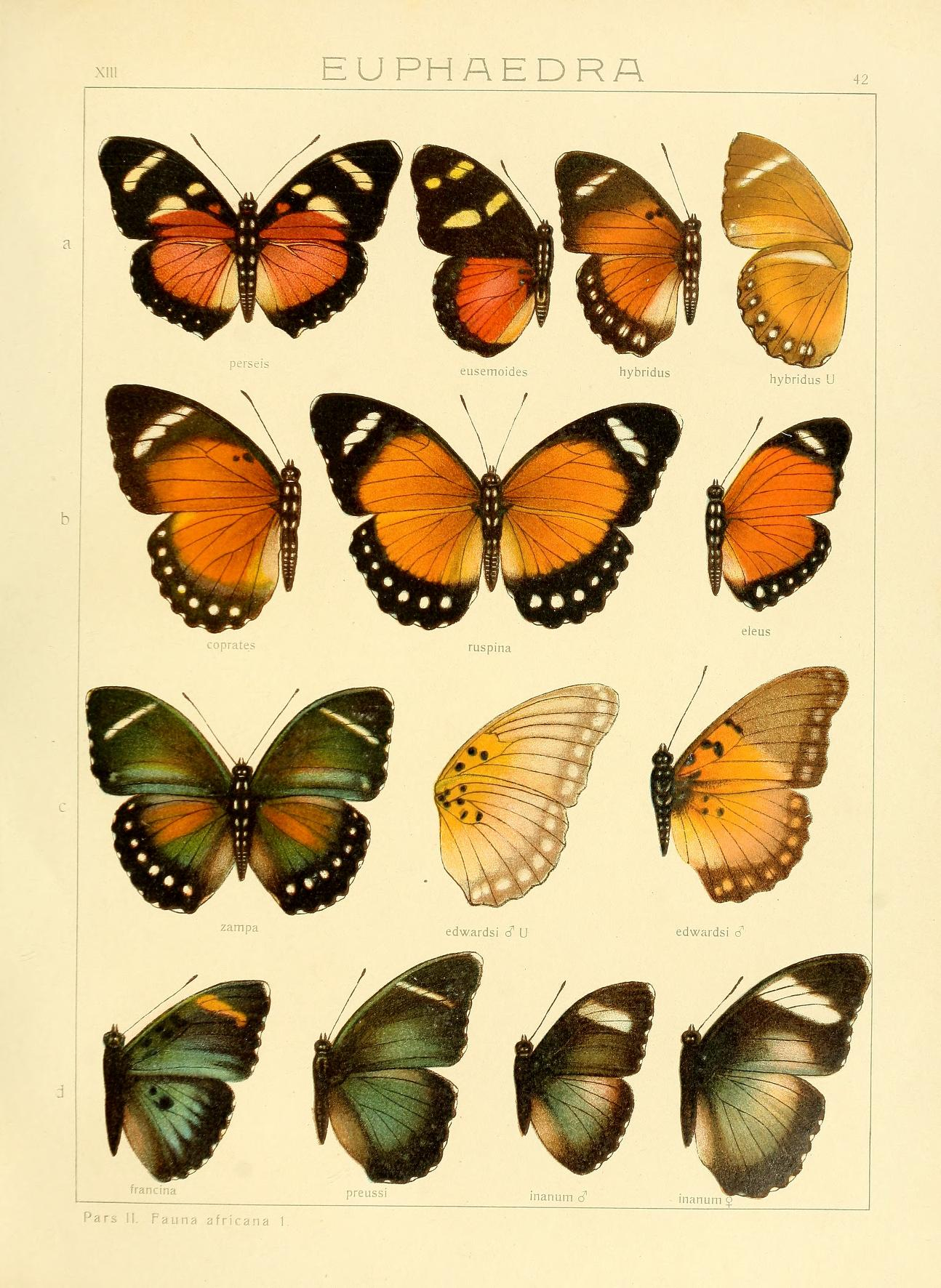
- In Adalbert Seitz's Fauna Africana

Scientific classification
- Kingdom: Animalia
- Phylum: Arthropoda
- Clade: Pancrustacea
- Class: Insecta
- Order: Lepidoptera
- Family: Nymphalidae
- Genus: Euphaedra
- Species: E. francina

Binomial name
- Euphaedra francina (Godart, 1824)

Synonyms
- Nymphalis francina Godart, 1824; Euphaedra (Euphaedrana) francina; Romaleosoma sophron Doubleday, 1848; Euphaedra franzina ab. latefasciata Neustetter, 1916

= Euphaedra francina =

Species of butterfly

Euphaedra francina, the magnificent forester, is a butterfly in the family Nymphalidae. It is found in Sierra Leone, Liberia, Ivory Coast and Ghana. The habitat consists of primary wet forests.

== Description ==
E. francina Godt. (42 d) varies but little and is a very easily recognized species. The wings are black above, at the base and hindmargin of the forewing and on the hindwing to beyond the middle a fine (greenish) blue with black spots in the cell (and at the base of cellule lb) on the forewing and a very large, rounded black spot at the end of the cell on the hindwing; the broad black marginal band is nearly always ornamented with large, sharply marked, rounded blue submarginal spots; the subapical band of the forewing is narrow, orange-yellow above, indistinct or whitish yellow beneath; the fringes are dotted with white at the ends of the interneural folds. The under surface is uniform greenish, more or less suffused with yellow or brown-yellow, with 2 or 3 black dots in the cells, but without distinct discal and submarginal spots; the hindwing at least in cellule 7 with the beginning of a narrow white median band, which is there bounded proximally by an angled black transverse streak. Sierra Leone.

== Similar species ==
Other members of the Euphaedra ceres species group

== Subspecies ==
- Euphaedra francina francina (Sierra Leone, Liberia)
- Euphaedra francina exuberans Collins & Larsen, 2005 (Ivory Coast, western Ghana)

Torben Larsen developed a species numbering system for his 2005 publication Butterflies of West Africa. The subspecies exuberans is #1106. The 'Larsen' numbers have since been used with permission in A Sharp Eye on Butterflies of Ghana.
