= Museum Rotterdam =

Coordinates: 51.90893°N 4.45745°E

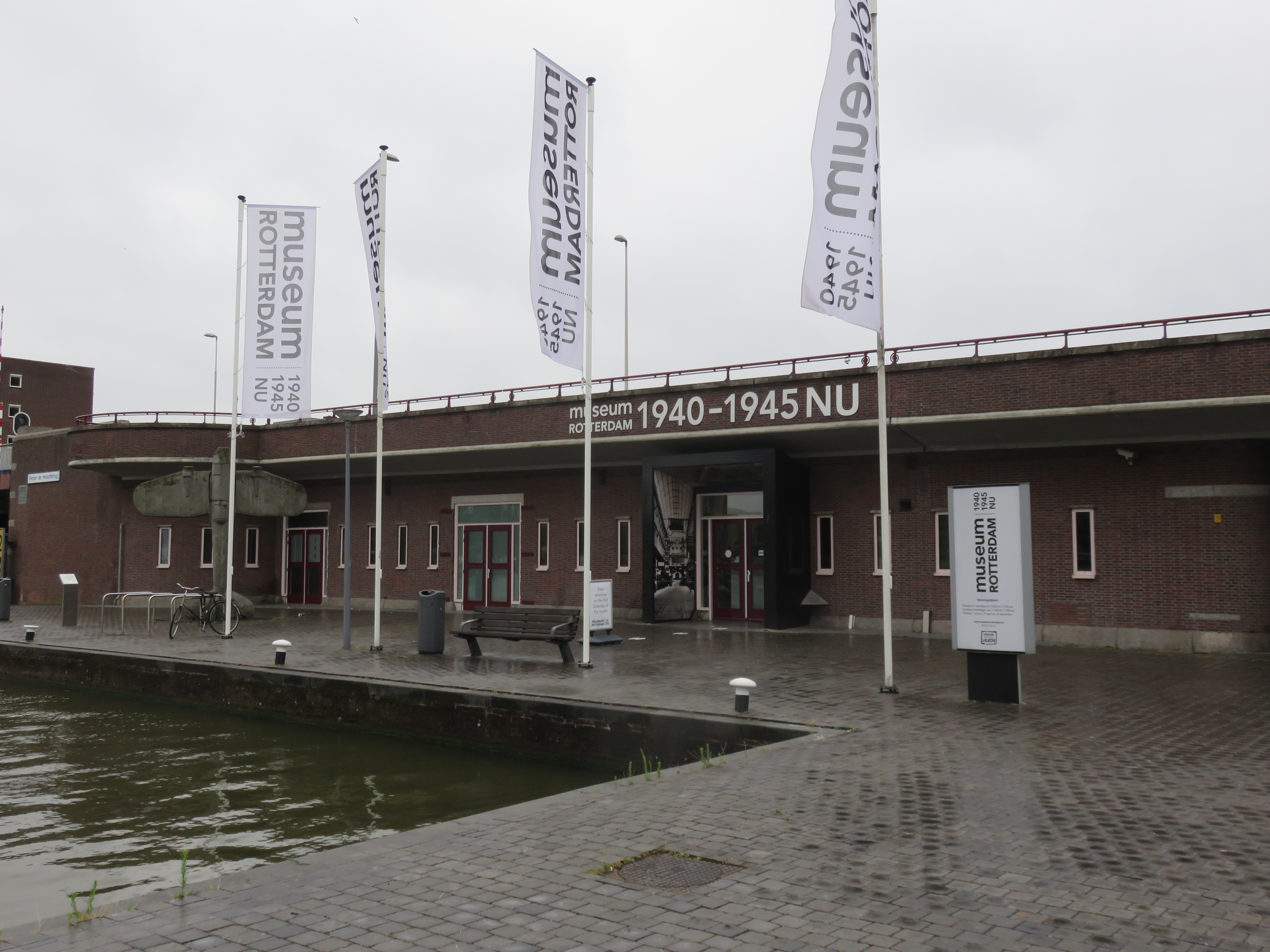
- Museum Rotterdam at the Coolhaven since 2020
- Former name: Historical Museum Rotterdam
- Established: 15 April 1905
- Location: Rodezand 26; Rotterdam, Netherlands
- Type: History museum
- Visitors: 70,000 (2018)
- Director: Paul van de Laar
- Website: www.museumrotterdam.nl

The Museum Rotterdam, until 2011 called the Historical Museum Rotterdam, is a museum about the history of Rotterdam located at the Coolhaven.

== History ==
In 1905 the museum was opened to the public as the Museum of Antiquities located at the Schielandshuis. In 1948 it was renamed the Historical Museum Rotterdam with the explicit purpose to preserve, describe and inventory objects related to urban history.

In 2011 the museum was renamed Museum Rotterdam, with the aim to exhibit Rotterdam as a contemporary transnational city in past and present sense. In 2016 it was located in the Timmerhuis designed by Rem Koolhaas in the city center, with a second location at the Coolhaven, called Museum Rotterdam '40-'45 NU.

Due to an ongoing reorganization in 2020 the Museum Rotterdam was relocated in the location at the Coolhaven.

== Collection ==
The museum has a collection ranging from household objects, such as ceramic tiles, furniture, kitchenware and tableware to textiles, clothing, hand fans, handbags, jewellery and coats of arms. Also needleworks, weaponry, tools and tobacco. And also from coins and medals, playing cards, board games to glassware, tins to books, paintings, photographs to sculptures and maquettes. All related to Rotterdam.
