= Delirious New York =

1978 book by Rem Koolhaas

- The cover of the first edition of the book, designed by Madelon Vriesendorp
- Author: Rem Koolhaas
- Original title: Delirious New York: A Retroactive Manifesto for Manhattan
- Illustrator: Nigel Smith, Donald Chong, Bob Gundu, Chris Rowat, and Nazik Tahri
- Cover artist: Madelon Vriesendorp
- Language: English
- Subject: New York City, architecture
- Genre: Non-fiction
- Set in: Franklin and News Gothic
- Publisher: Oxford University Press, The Monacelli Press
- Publication date: 1978
- Media type: Print, e-book
- Pages: 320
- ISBN: 978-1885254009
- OCLC: 31765587
- Dewey Decimal: 720.9747
- LC Class: 94076577
- Preceded by: -
- Followed by: S,M,L,XL
- Website: oma.eu/publications/delirious-new-york

Delirious New York: A Retroactive Manifesto for Manhattan is a 1978 book, written by Dutch architect Rem Koolhaas. The book serves as a "retroactive manifesto" for Manhattan between 1850 and 1960, analyzing the development of architecture and urban design throughout New York's history from the founding of New Amsterdam by the Dutch, to the design of the Headquarters of the United Nations by Le Corbusier. Rem Koolhaas describes the concept of 'Manhattanism', the theory of the creation and functioning of the city of New York, at length in the book.

== Background ==
The first drafts for the book originate from 1969 in a manifesto by Rem Koolhaas titled 'The Surface'. Koolhaas had been studying at the Architectural Association School of Architecture in London since 1968 and wrote the manifesto as a reaction against lectures by Tony Dugdale of the architectural collective Archigram.

In 1972, after obtaining a grant to study at Cornell University, Koolhaas moved to New York in an effort to research the city. In doing so, Koolhaas collected magazines, books and postcards from Manhattan for research and joined a postcard collectors' club. Furthermore, Koolhaas joined the Institute for Architecture and Urban Studies. In an interview with Robert Venturi and Denise Scott Brown, Koolhaas cites their book Learning from Las Vegas as being an influence on the writing of Delirious New York during this period at Cornell.

Delirious New York was published three years after Koolhaas founded the Office for Metropolitan Architecture with Elia Zenghelis, Zoe Zenghelis and Madelon Vriesendorp in London in 1975. During this period, Koolhaas further collaborated with Elia Zenghelis on several hypothetical projects in Manhattan, such as redeveloping Roosevelt Island (1975) or the design for the Sphinx Hotel at Times Square (1975).

In a 1993 interview with architecture critic Cynthia Davidson, Koolhaas stated that the aim of publishing Delirious New York was to lay the written foundation to work from as an architect, before actually starting out as one. In this sense, Koolhaas has been described as being a paper architect around this time, given that his first built design was in 1985.

== Cover ==
The cover image of the first edition of the book was designed by Madelon Vriesendorp. The painting 'Flagrant Délit' depicts the Chrysler Building and the Empire State Building laying in bed, with 30 Rockefeller Plaza intruding on them. The gridiron street pattern of Manhattan is shown through the window, with the rooftops of skyscrapers being faces looking at the ordeal. Furthermore, the nightlight near the Empire State Building is the torch of the Statue of Liberty and a used condom in the shape of a Goodyear Blimp can be seen lying on the bed, referencing the zeppelin docking station built on top of the tower.

The 1994 republication of the book by The Monacelli Press changed the cover image to a black and white photo of the 1221 and 1251 Avenue of the Americas buildings as seen from 30 Rockefeller Plaza.

== Publication ==
Delirious New York was first published as a hardcover in 1978 by the New York division of the Oxford University Press and was printed in France. A paperback version with a new cover was published in 1994 by New York based Monacelli Press for distribution in the United States and Rotterdam based 010 Publishers for Europe. Further versions by the Monacelli Press have been printed in 1997, 2005, 2014. Aside from the covers, these versions do not differ from the original text.

== See also ==
- S, M, L, XL, the 1995 book from Koolhaas which includes excerpts from Delirious New York.
