= Embassy of the Netherlands, Berlin =

Coordinates: 52°30′55″N 13°24′43″E

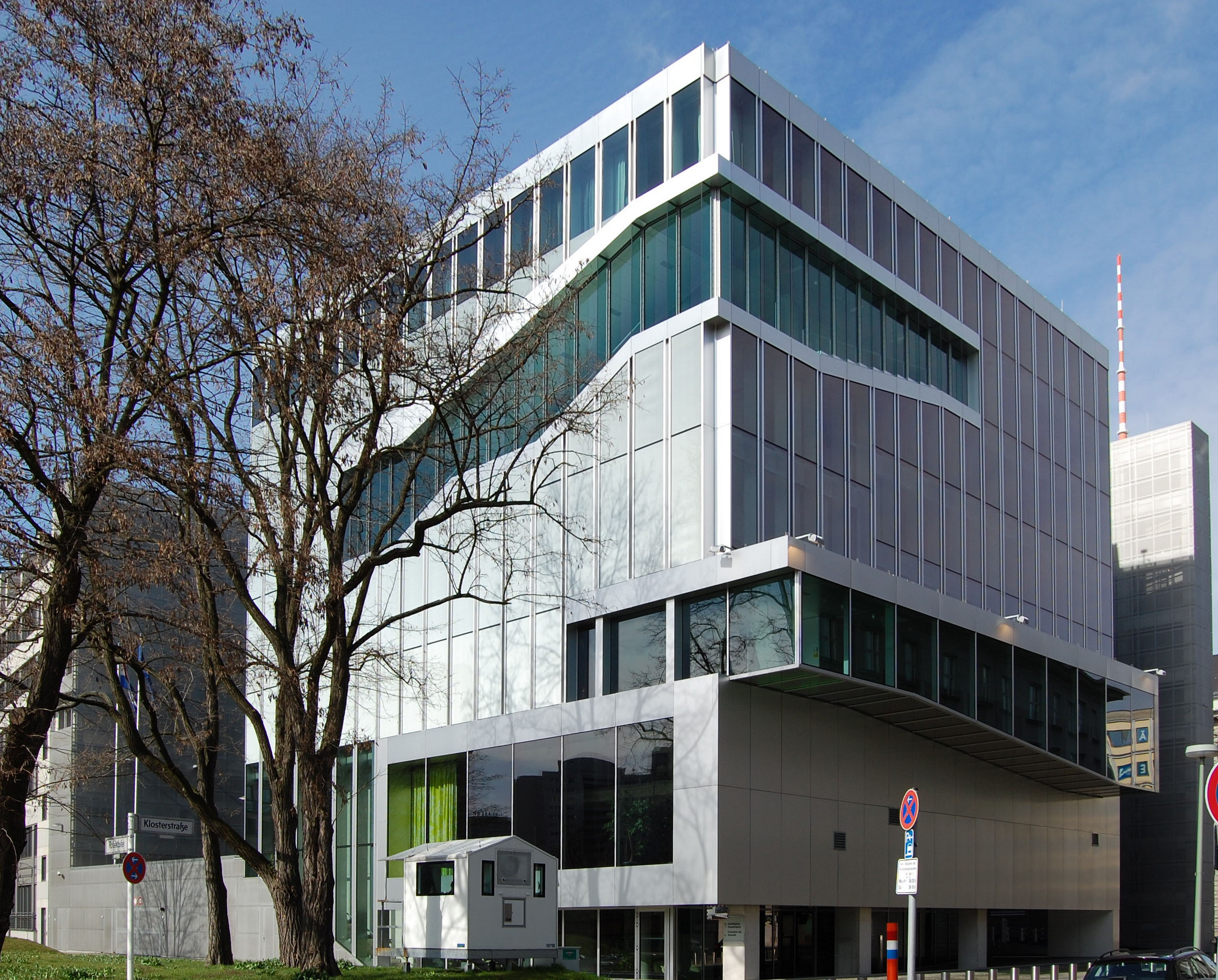
- The Embassy in Berlin
- Location: Berlin, Germany
- Address: Klosterstraße 50
- Opened: 2 March 2004
- Ambassador: Wepke Kingma
- Chargé d'affaires: Dr. Henk Voskamp

The Embassy of the Netherlands in Berlin (Dutch: Nederlandse ambassade te Berlijn, German: Niederländische Botschaft in Deutschland) is the Netherlands' diplomatic mission in Berlin, Germany. Designed by Rem Koolhaas of OMA, the building was opened in 2004.

== History ==
In the wake of the reunification the German government decided to relocate the capital to Mitte, Berlin. The Netherlands, having sold their former embassy site after the War, was free to choose a new location and preferred Roland Ufer in Mitte, the oldest Berlin settlement, next to the (new) government district of their main trade partner.

Queen Beatrix of the Netherlands opened the Embassy on 2 March 2004 together with the Ministers of Foreign Affairs Ben Bot of the Netherlands and Joschka Fischer of Germany.

== Concept ==
A solitary building, integrating requirements of conventional civil service security with Dutch openness was needed. Traditional (former West Berlin) city planning guidelines demanded the new building to complete the city block in 19th century fashion, the (former East Berlin) city planning officials had an open mind towards the OMA proposal for a freestanding cube on a - block completing - podium. The office in the end realized the building in a combination of obedience (fulfilling the block’s perimeter) and disobedience (building a solitary cube).

As the diplomats used the hallway in the old embassy building a lot for informal meetings OMA gave them a building with an enormous hallway as centre: a continuous trajectory reaching all eight stories of the embassy shapes the building’s internal communication. The workspaces are the ‘leftover areas’ after the trajectory was ‘carved’ out of the cube and are situated along the facade. Reception spaces are activated inside the cube. Other semi-public spaces are located closer to the facade and at one point cantilever out over the drop-off area. From the entry, the trajectory leads on via the library, meeting rooms, fitness area and restaurant to the roof terrace. The trajectory exploits the relationship with the context, river Spree, Television Tower (Fernsehturm), park and wall of embassy residences; part of it is a ‘diagonal void’ through the building that allows to see the TV Tower from the park.

The (slightly over pressurized) trajectory works as a main airduct from which fresh air percolates to the offices to be drawn off via the double (plenum) facade. This ventilation concept is part of a strategy to integrate more functions into one element.

== Awards ==
Koolhaas's design won the Architekturpreis Berlin in 2003 and the Mies van der Rohe Award for European Architecture in 2005.
