= Glodok prison =

Former prison in Jakarta, Indonesia

- Prisoner's illustration of the Glodok prison courtyard c.1942–3
- Interactive map of Glodok prison
- Location: 6.141992083396053°S 106.81695435103622°E
- Status: closed
- Opened: 1743
- Closed: 23 October 1972

Glodok Prison (Indonesian: Penjara Glodok, Dutch: Gevangenis Glodok or Boei Glodok) was a historical prison in Jakarta, Indonesia. Originally built by the Dutch to imprison Chinese rebels in the 1740s, it was gradually expanded to include Indonesian criminals and used as a transit point for administrative exiles. From the 1920s to 1950s it was used to detain several different populations depending on which regime was in power. In the 1920s and 1930s it held Indonesian communists and nationalists, during the Second World War it held Europeans and Prisoners of War, and after the war it held former Japanese soldiers and Indonesian republicans. A number of notable Indonesians were imprisoned at Glodok, including the novelist Pramoedya Ananta Toer and the politician Mohammad Hatta.

The prison site was sold in 1972 and the remaining 500 prisoners were transferred to Cipinang Penitentiary Institution. The former site was redeveloped into Glodok Plaza Mall and adjacent buildings.

== History ==
=== 1740s to 1900 ===
The prison was built by the Dutch East India Company in 1743 in Glodok, then a newly-established ghetto for Chinese Indonesians outside the city walls of Batavia. It was originally intended to house mainly Chinese prisoners following the bloody 1740 Batavia massacre, when following a rebellion of Chinese workers almost 10,000 were massacred by the Dutch. As the city developed around it, the streets adjacent were were Molenvliet-Oost (today Jalan Hayam Wuruk in Jakarta) and Gang Lindeteves (today Jalan Blustru), near the Batang Hari canal off the Ciliwung river. Although it operated continuously before the 20th century, very little has been written about earlier eras of the prison's existence.

=== 1900 to 1942 ===
By the start of the 20th century the prison was used as a transit point for the exile of prisoners, as a local jail, and for long-term criminals. For example, In 1906, 200 Acehnese prisoners from the Aceh War were held in Glodok on their way to deportation to Nusa Kambangan. Conditions were poor in the prison in the early 20th century, with a high death rate, vermin infestations, regular deaths and riots, and outbreaks of conditions such as Beri-beri. Forced labour was also formalized in 1907 in Glodok and other civil and military prisons in Java, and almost immediately accusations arose that work gang foremen in Glodok were demanding bribes from new prisoners. As the population of Batavia continued to grow, Cipinang prison was opened in around 1915, a larger and more modern institution than Glodok. Glodok's operation and conditions were quite old-fashioned and even primitive; until the prison was attacked by armed members of the Communist Party of Indonesia in November 1926, it was still guarded by pikemen in blue uniforms.

Guards at the entrance of Glodok prison following the PKI attack, November 1926.

After the failed 1926 uprising the prison was turned over entirely to housing long-term prisoners who were mostly communists. Its security was updated a bit, as the former pikemen were removed and modern guards and a military detachment replaced them. The prison was extremely overcrowded following the mass arrests of communists, with an estimate of 1,450 prisoners in December 1927; by 1930 it had returned to roughly 800. The government was asked if it intended to expand the prison to ease the crowded circumstances, and in late 1927 it responded that it did not. Glodok continued to be treated as a transit centre; local communists were eventually sent to Padang to be imprisoned, while roughly 315 from East Java and Sumatra were held at Glodok. Many more stopped at Glodok until they were sent to Boven-Digoel concentration camp in Papua, but those were generally not charged with any crime (Administrative detention). Even with the lower numbers after 1930, Glodok prison continued to be very overcrowded, with often 40 to a room; communist prisoners held hunger strikes and other organized resistance into the 1930s.

Photo in Glodok prison, c.1880–1920.

A newspaper report from November 1930 upon the opening of a psychopathy section gives an idea of the general conditions in the prison. It describes 800 prisoners in total, among them 500 communists, divided into different sections by racial or ethnic background. There were various workshops in the prison making coconut oil soap, rope from coconut bark, and other products. Other articles during the 1930s commented on the unsanitary conditions in the prison, as in earlier eras. Mohammad Husni Thamrin, an Indonesian nationalist member of the Volksraad, had toured the prison in May 1935 and reported in the Volksraad in July that strict treatment of prisoners was contributing to the poor health and sanitation. For example, a single barrel of water for drinking was put out for prisoners in a particular section every day; prisoners were beaten if they crowded around it during break times from work shifts, and it was often not refilled if it was emptied. Soap was given, but 800 inmates had only 10 minutes to bathe themselves in 7 bathrooms. The medical room was infested with insects, and the amount of medicine supplied was utterly insufficient for a population of that size.

Political figures from other parties than the communist party were imprisoned at Glodok during the 1930s as Dutch repression of all political expression continued. In some cases these prisoners died under mysterious circumstances, as in the case of Sukabat, a member of Tan Malaka's Pari party who may have died by suicide in February 1930. In other cases future independence era politicians were held there. For example, in February 1934, Mohammad Hatta and Mohamad Bondan were arrested by Dutch authorities along with other prominent leaders of a nationalist intellectual group Indonesian National Education (Indonesian: Pendidikan Nasional Indonesia) and imprisoned at Glodok. By this time some European prisoners were also held in Glodok, though these may have been Indo people (of mixed European and Indonesian descent) who were treated as Europeans in the Indies legal system.

In early 1941, not long before the Japanese invasion, the Dutch declared their intention to renovate the prison and the adjacent police barracks, though it is unclear how much work was done before the fall of Dutch rule.

Inmates digging foxholes in the Glodok prison, 1945

=== World War II and war of independence ===
The Japanese occupied Batavia and the rest of Java in March 1942 following the Battle of Java, and before long Glodok prison was repurposed as an internment camp for Dutch nationals and other Europeans in the city. This included 3–400 Indo youths who refused to serve under Japan; many of these were treated harshly in Glodok and dozens died in prison. Survivors described forced labour (ropemaking and gardening), daily drills and very poor nutrition. As the war continued the prisoners came to include American, Australian and British prisoners of war who could not be fit in POW Camps elsewhere in Java.

Japanese troops captured by the Dutch in Sumatra and imprisoned in Glodok, September 1947.

When Jakarta fell back into Dutch hands during the Indonesian war of independence, the former European prisoners were released and it once again became a detention site for Indonesians with republican sympathies, including former soldiers for the Dutch army who had deserted to the Indonesian National Armed Forces as well as former collaborators with the Japanese. Japanese officers were also imprisoned there, most notably Major General Shōzō Nishida, former head of the Kempeitai in Java and a suspected war criminal, but also low-level former soldiers. A newspaper report in June 1946 noted that there were 700 Japanese prisoners at Glodok at the time. And after mass arrests of republicans in Dutch-held territory took place in July 1947, around 55 left-wing republicans ended up in Glodok. There were executions of former Japanese officers (mainly high-level war criminals), including Kenichi Sone, and Indonesians who had committed violent crimes during Bersiap in the prison during the late 1940s.

=== In independent Indonesia ===
After the Dutch–Indonesian Round Table Conference in late 1949, the Republic of Indonesia gained final control over Jakarta and the prison fell back into republican hands. Among the first round of high-profile prisoners there in 1950 were former Dutch government agents, accomplices and journalists who were rounded up after Raymond Westerling's attempted coup in Bandung. According to an account by one of these former prisoners, J. H. Ritman, the existing population of the prison was cleared out with the intention to make it a military prison. Leftists and Chinese Indonesians arrested in November 1950 were also held in Glodok, but these were released after a few days, whereas those detained during the 1951 mass arrests in Indonesia were in some cases held for as long as a year. That was the case for the novelist Pramoedya Ananta Toer, who was held there until 1952. In January 1951 some of those detained in the mass arrests went on hunger strike in Glodok prison; most were released without ever being charged with a new government (the Wilopo Cabinet) came to power in April 1952. The suspected Westerling associates, however, were held without trial for several years.

Less has been written about the use of the prison in its final two decades; it continued to operate as a part of the Indonesian prison system. In 1965 members of the Indonesian rock band Koes Bersaudara were imprisoned at Glodok for 100 days for performing songs by The Beatles. The prison did not last long into the New Order era, as it was closed in 1972 when the government decided to open a new, larger prison outside of Jakarta at Tanah Tinggi, Tangerang. The site was sold for 560 million rupiah in 1972 and demolished, with the remaining 500 prisoners relocated to Cipinang Penitentiary Institution. An earlier Glodok Plaza Mall was built on part of the site, though it was demolished and rebuilt within a decade. The current Glodok Plaza Mall is still on the same site the Glodok district of Jakarta, which is now a primarily Indonesian Chinese shopping district.
