= Kenichi Sone =

Japanese army officer and war criminal

- 曽根 健一
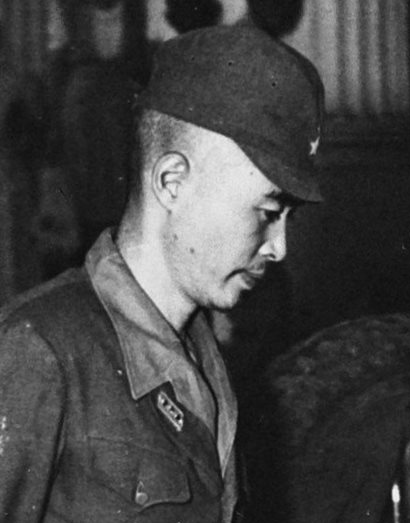
- Sone in 1946
- Born: c. 1909; Yura, Wakayama, Japan
- Died: 7 December 1946 (aged 36-37); Batavia, Dutch East Indies
- Status: Executed by firing squad
- Conviction: War crimes
- Penalty: Death

Kenichi Sone (曽根 健一, Sone Ken'ichi; c. 1909 – 7 December 1946), also rendered as Kenitji Sonei and variants, was an Imperial Japanese Army captain during the Pacific War. Following the Japanese conquest and occupation of the Dutch East Indies (present-day Indonesia), he was the commander of the 10th Battalion prisoner of war camp from September 1942 to February 1944 and of the Tjideng civilian internment camp from April 1944 to June 1945.

== Camp commandant of Tjideng ==
Nicknamed "Sunny Boy" by camp residents, Sone developed a reputation for being a rampant Europhobe and violent drunk who made life hell for internees and subordinates who defied him. Twice a day, he had all prisoners, including children and the infirm, line up for roll call and made them stand for hours in the full sun. When an inmate was absent, roll call would be extended until they were accounted for, sometimes until past midnight. Beatings were frequent and arbitrary.

While camp rations were meager, Sone had his dogs fed in front of the camp gate. In full view of the hungry prisoners, he personally served both animals fried eggs with meat, prepared by his cook. Similarly, Sone kept an aviary on camp grounds, where myna birds were fed freshly cooked rice, fruit, and vegetables as internees looked on. On occasion, he would halt food distribution entirely, notably between 5–7 June 1945, when he even ordered the burial of newly arrived bread.

Sone was said to have displayed symptoms of manic depression and was considered "moonstruck" as many of his most brutal acts of violence took place during a full moon, culminating on the night of 21–22 June 1945, when tens of women and girls were beaten and had their heads shaven. On 23 June, lieutenant Sado Sakai took over command of Tjideng and Sone was transferred to Bandung, where he would be arrested by the Allies following the end of World War II in Asia.

== Death ==
Convicted of the war crimes of exercising systematic terror and maltreating prisoners of war and civilian internees, Sone was sentenced to death by the Provisional Court-Martial at Batavia on 2 September 1946. The sentence was carried out by a firing squad in Glodok prison on 7 December of the same year, after a request for clemency to the acting governor-general of the Dutch East Indies, Hubertus van Mook, was rejected. Sone was one of over 200 Japanese nationals who were executed for wartime atrocities in the Dutch East Indies, out of more than 1,000 Japanese soldiers and civilians prosecuted for war crimes in the colony.

A quote from the court documents:

"[That he] in Tjideng concentration camp for civilian women and children committed war crimes and caused war crimes to be committed, in contravention of international law and the law of armed conflict, subjected them to bad treatment and a systematic reign of terror over the aforementioned persons maltreated many of them repeatedly unnecessarily, in any case, in a way that far exceeded the limits of the normal exercise of discipline, to mistreat and cause them to be mistreated, to leave them standing for hours, even at night, on roll calls and to give them sufficient rest, food, medicines and nursing care and furthermore to have women and children perform excessively hard labour, which by and at the behest of him, the Defendant, exercised terror and/or ill-treatment, caused the death of many prisoners and internees, and caused physical and mental suffering of those persons."
