= Anna Klingmann =

German architect, urbanist, author, and academic

- Born: Germany
- Education: Berlin University of the Arts, Architectural Association School of Architecture, Pratt Institute
- Occupation: Architect
- Practice: Klingmann Architects and Brand Consultants
- Projects: Khawr Awqad Ecological Community, Oman; Al Kifaf Mixed-Use District, Dubai, Al Kifaf Esplanade, Dubai, Al Khobar Waterfront, Saudi Arabia
- Website: www.klingmann.com

Anna Klingmann is a German-born American architect, urbanist, author, and researcher who specializes in destination creation, placemaking, and place branding. She is considered a preeminent expert on Brandism in architecture and is a consultant for several real estate developers in New York, the Middle East, and Europe. She is the founder and principal architect of Klingmann Architects and Brand Consultants, and author of Brandscapes: Architecture in the Experience Economy. Klingmann coined the term "brandism" which describes how architecture can communicate a company's brand to the public. She also has described the concept of a "brandscape" which describes corporate value systems embodied into the physical landscape. Her description of brandism can also be used not just to describe single structures; entire cities can have a unique brand or "expression of identity." Klingmann argues that "Branded architecture on a massive scale changes a city in profound ways." But Klingmann also believes that branded landscapes can "effect lasting, meaningful changes when drawing upon the dormant or explicit potential of particular cultures and places." In this process, she argues, identity, belonging, heritage and social factors play an important role in the co-designing and curation/branding of place to have a positive impact on residents’ feelings about the value of their place in the world. Anna Klingmann suggests that architects need to take control of this aspect of their work, using it for social good rather than manipulation.

== Education and career ==
Klingmann moved to New York City in 1984 and went to the Parson's School of Design. She earned her architecture degrees from Pratt Institute, the Architectural Association in London Architectural Association School of Architecture and the Berlin University of the Arts.

Klingmann's main influence is Louis Kahn. Other influences include Zaha Hadid and Rem Koolhaas. In 2007, she worked for the architecture firm, Gensler, to design two large-scale mixed-use projects. In 2014, she curated a collaborative project with the University and the Saudi Commission for Tourism and Antiquities (SCTA) which looks to connect artists, scientists, architects, and the community with the historic legacy and culture of Asir. The initiative seeks to engage international and local artists, architects, designers, scientists, curators, scholars and community stakeholders in a dialogue that explores ways to bring the past of Asir into a significant future, by merging ancient wisdom with cutting-edge trends and technology.

Klingmann is an adjunct associate professor at the New York Institute of Technology. She was the architecture department chair at Dar Al-Hekma University in Saudi Arabia from 2014–2017. She has also taught at Cornell University (2000–2003), and Columbia University(2004).

== Publications ==
=== Monograph ===
Klingmann, A. Brandscapes: Architecture in the Experience Economy, First Edition, MIT Press, Cambridge, 2007; Second Edition, MIT Press, Cambridge, 2010; Mandarin Edition, Electronic Publishing House, Beijing, 2014

=== Contribution to academic journals ===
- Klingmann, Anna (27 January 2023). "Rescripting Riyadh: how the capital of Saudi Arabia employs urban megaprojects as catalysts to enhance the quality of life within the city's neighborhoods". Journal of Place Management and Development. 16 (1): 45–72. doi:10.1108/JPMD-06-2021-0062. ISSN 1753-8335. S2CID 256298257.
- Klingmann, Anna (19 February 2022). "Adaptive Reuse Strategy for Abandoned Historic Villages in Asir (Saudi Arabia): A Participatory Approach". Ekistics and the New Habitat. 81 (2): 10–21. doi:10.53910/26531313-E2021812563. ISSN 2653-1313.
- Klingmann, Anna (19 February 2022). "Branding Saudi Arabia's Capital". Ekistics and the New Habitat. 81 (2): 39–51. doi:10.53910/26531313-E2021812458. ISSN 2653-1313.
- Klingmann, Anna (13 April 2022). "Re-scripting Riyadh's historical downtown as a global destination: a sustainable model?". Journal of Place Management and Development. 15 (2): 93–111. doi:10.1108/JPMD-07-2020-0071. ISSN 1753-8335. S2CID 233567942.
- Klingmann, Anna (2021). "Adaptive reuse strategy for abandoned historic villages in Asir (Saudi Arabia): a participatory approach". Ekistics and the New Habitat. 81 (2). doi:10.53910/26531313-E2021812563.
- Mohamed, Mady; Klingmann, Anna; Samir, Haitham (2019). "Examining the Thermal Performance of Vernacular Houses in Asir Region of Saudi Arabia". Alexandria Engineering Journal. 58 (2): 419–428. doi:10.1016/j.aej.2019.03.004.
- Klingmann, Anna (24 July 2009). "Eyes Which Do not See: Liners, Automobiles, Airplanes". Architectural Theory Review. 9 (1): 19–35. doi:10.1080/13264820409478504. S2CID 144487048.
- Klingmann, Anna (2005). "The Meaningless Popularity of Rem Koolhaas". Thresholds. 29 (29): 74–80. doi:10.1162/thld_a_00309.
- Angélil, M.; Klingmann, Anna (1999). "Hybrid Morphologies". Daidalos. 73 (1561–0152).
- Angélil, M.; Klingmann, A. (1999). "Militante Hermeneutik : Interpretation als Entwurfsmethode". Trans. 4 (1999): 38–48. doi:10.5169/seals-919194.

=== Bookchapters ===
- Klingmann, A. (2023). Rescripting Saudi Arabia: The crafting of a new nation brand. In Gottwald, D., Turner-Rahman, G., Vahdat, V. (Eds.), Virtual Interiorities, Carnegie Mellon ETC Press
- Klingmann, A. (2016). The Rise of Shopping Malls in the Framework of Gulf Capitalism. In Lepik, A., Baader, S.(Eds.), World of Malls: Architecture of Consumption. Berlin: Hatje Cantz.Part of ISBN 978-3-7757-4138-5
- Klingmann, A. (2010). Creative Brandscapes: Heroes with Flaws. In Kiib, Hans (Ed.) Performative Urban Design, Aalborg: Aalborg Universitetsforlag. Part of ISBN 978-87-7307-982-9
- Klingmann, A (2001). Datascapes: Libraries as Information Landscapes. In Bieri, S., Fuchs, W. (Ed.), Bibliotheken Bauen / Building for Books: Tradition und Vision. Basel: Birkhäuser. Part of ISBN 978-3-7643-6429-8
