= Madelon Vriesendorp =

Dutch artist, painter, sculptor and art collector

- Born: 1945 (age 80–81); Bilthoven, Holland
- Occupations: Artist, Illustrator
- Spouse: Rem Koolhaas (?–2012)
- Children: 2

Madelon Vriesendorp (born 1945 in Bilthoven) is a Dutch artist, painter, sculptor, and art collector. She was married to Rem Koolhaas and is best known as one of the co-founders of the Office of Metropolitan Architecture (OMA) in the early 1970s (together with Koolhaas and Elia Zenghelis and Zoe Zenghelis). Vriesendorp would often create visuals and graphics for OMA in the early years.

== Early life and education ==
Vriesendorp was born 1945, Bilthoven, Netherlands. She attended Rietveld Academy in Amsterdam in 1964. In 1969, she attended classes at St. Martin’s School of Art in London.

== Work ==
For many years Vriesendorp contributed to Office of Metropolitan Architecture (OMA) by providing graphics and illustrations for the publications of their theoretical concepts. Her painting "Flagrant Delit" (English: Flagrant Crime) (1978) is recognizable and was used as the cover image for Delirious New York, written by Rem Koolhaas and first published in 1978. Flagrant Delit features the Empire State building and the Chrysler building of New York City, post coitus in bed together while outside the window an armless version of the Statue of Liberty looks sad. Vriesendorp noted that both buildings were built in the 1930s in New York City and were competing to be the tallest in the skyline, however the Empire State building appeared more masculine when compared to the Chrysler building. Koolhaas suggested she add in the Rockefeller Center catching the two buildings in the act, as a reference to Modernity.

Her largest artwork was a mural (1987–2015) on the stage tower of the Netherlands Dance Theatre in The Hague, however in 2015 the building and the mural was demolished.

The World of Madelon Vriesendorp: Paintings/Postcards/Objects/Games was a 40-year retrospective exhibition of the artist's career, curated by Shumon Basar and Stephan Trüby. It originated at the Architectural Association School of Architecture, London in 2008, and then toured to Aedes, Berlin; the Venice Biennale of Architecture; and finally the Swiss Architecture Museum, Basel. It was accompanied by a richly illustrated catalogue, and had contributions from Beatriz Colomina, Douglas Coupland, Hubert Damisch, Teri Wehn-Damisch, Zaha Hadid, Charles Jencks, Charlie Koolhaas, Hans Ulrich Obrist, Brett Steele and Fenna Haakma Wagenaar.

In 2018, she was awarded The Architectural Review, Ada Louise Huxtable Prize for her contributions to the architectural industry. Her acceptance speech for the award was political and talked about the "women written out of the script", because for many years Vriesendorps contributions to Office of Metropolitan Architecture (OMA) were not acknowledged.

In 2025, she was awarded The Soane Medal, in recognition of her lasting contribution to architecture and the legacy of designs, images and paintings she has created. She collected her award and delivered a lecture at the Royal Academy on 18 November 2025. Established in 2017, the Soane Medal, organised annually by Sir John Soane's Museum, recognises those who have made a major contribution to their field through practice, history or theory, and in doing so have enriched the public understanding of architecture.

== Personal life ==
Vriesendorp lives in London and has two children, Charlie Koolhaas, a photographer, and Tomas Koolhaas, a filmmaker. She was previously married to Rem Koolhaas, they divorced in 2012.

== Collections ==
Vriesendorp's work is held in the following permanent collections:

- Museum of Modern Art, New York
- FRAC Centre, Orléans, France

== Bibliography ==
- Rem Koolhaas, Delirious New York: A Retroactive Manifesto for Manhattan, first edition. Oxford University Press, 1978
- Shumon Basar, Stephan Trüby (eds.): The World of Madelon Vriesendorp, Architectural Association Publications, London, 2008
