= Tjideng =

Japanese WWII internment camp for women and children

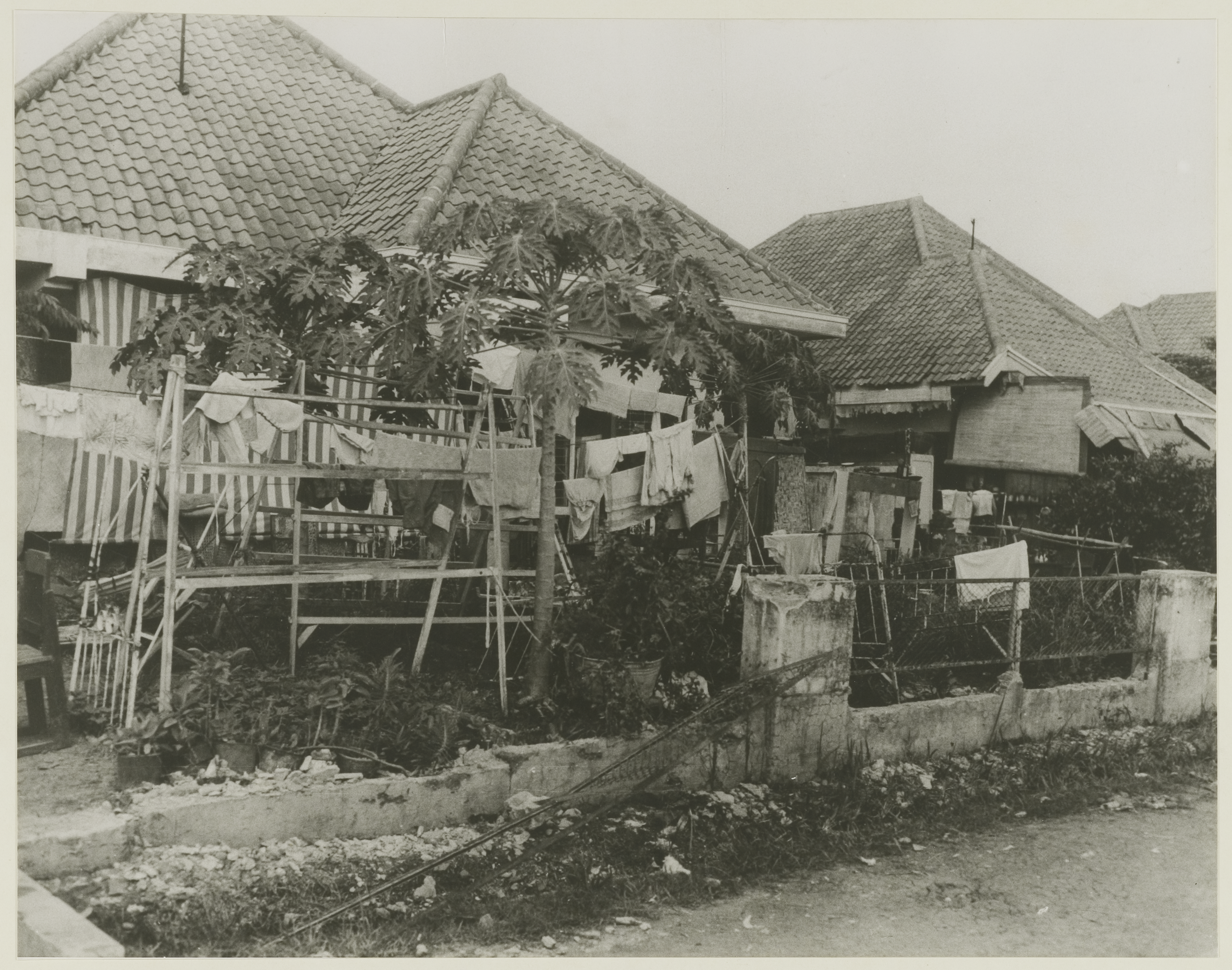
- Exterior of some of the houses of Tjideng internment camp (1945). Each house accommodated as many as twenty women and children.
- Interactive map of Tjideng
- Country: Kingdom of the Netherlands
- Colony: Dutch East Indies
- City: Batavia
- Opened: 1942
- Closed: 1945
- Founder: Japanese Empire

Tjideng was a Japanese-run internment camp for women and children during World War II, in the former Dutch East Indies (present-day Indonesia).

The Empire of Japan began the invasion of the Dutch East Indies on 10 January 1942. During the Japanese occupation, which lasted until the end of the war in September 1945, people from European descent were sent to internment camps. This included mostly Dutch people, but also Americans, British and Australians. The Japanese camps were described by ex-prisoners as concentration camps or passive extermination camps; due to the large-scale and consistent withholding of food and medicine, large numbers of prisoners died over time.

== Camp Tjideng ==
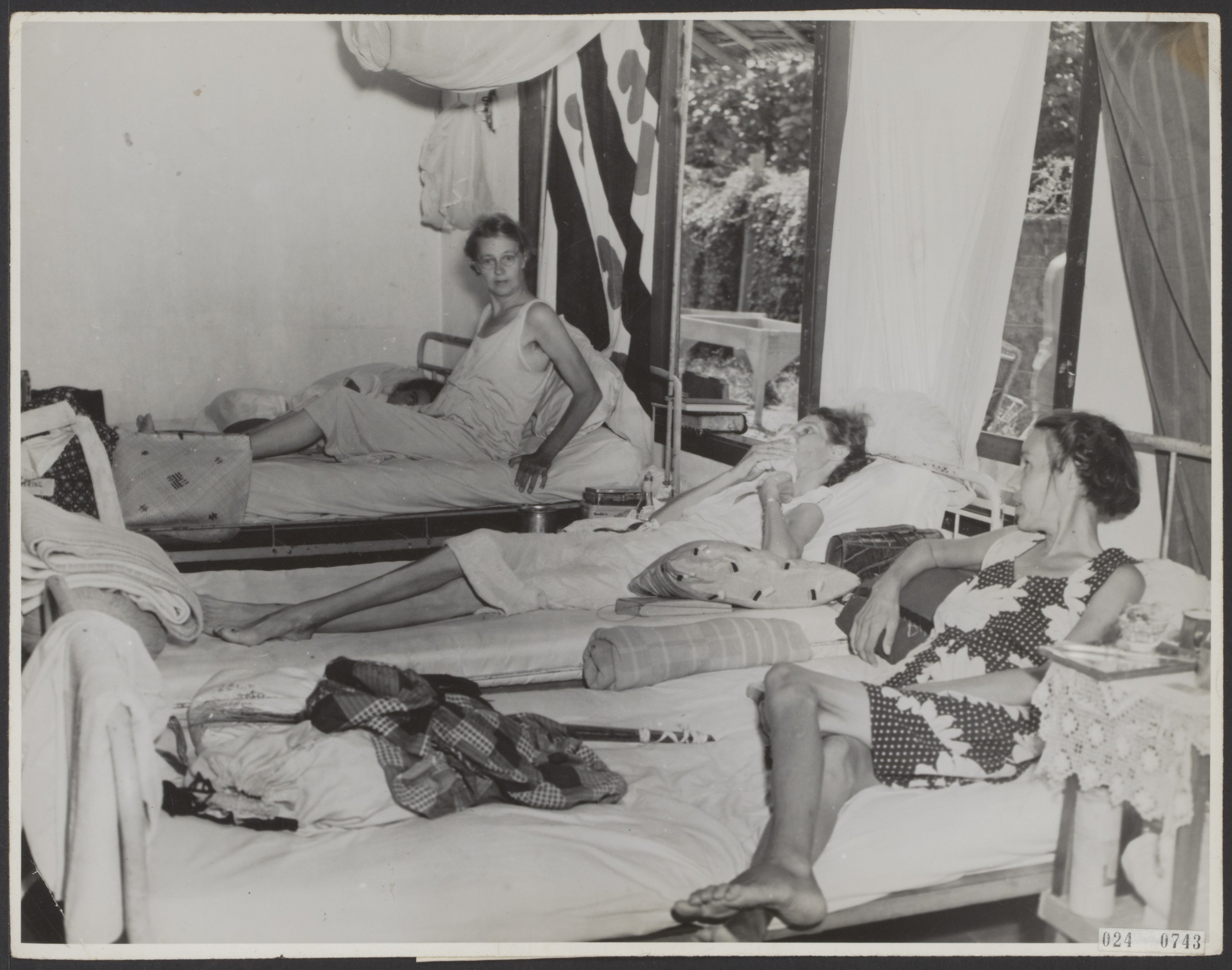
Women in the sickbay of Tjideng Camp shortly after the Japanse Capitulation in 1945

Camp Tjideng was located in the city of Batavia (present-day Jakarta), the capital of the Dutch East Indies. Part of Tjideng, a suburb to the west of the city was fenced off and used for the internment of European women and children. The men and older boys were transferred to other camps, including prisoner of war camps. Dwellings varied from brick bungalows with pan tiled roofs to huts made in traditional Javanese style from bamboo.

Initially Tjideng was called a 'protected area' by the Japanese and under civilian authority. The conditions were bearable. When the Japanese military took over control in April 1944, privileges such as being allowed to cook or hold church services were quickly withdrawn. Food preparation was centralised and the quality and quantity of food rapidly declined. Living circumstances worsened. Sewerage systems were broken. Hunger and disease struck, and because medicines and medical treatment were being denied, the number of fatalities increased. Death due to infections and malnutrition became a daily occurrence.

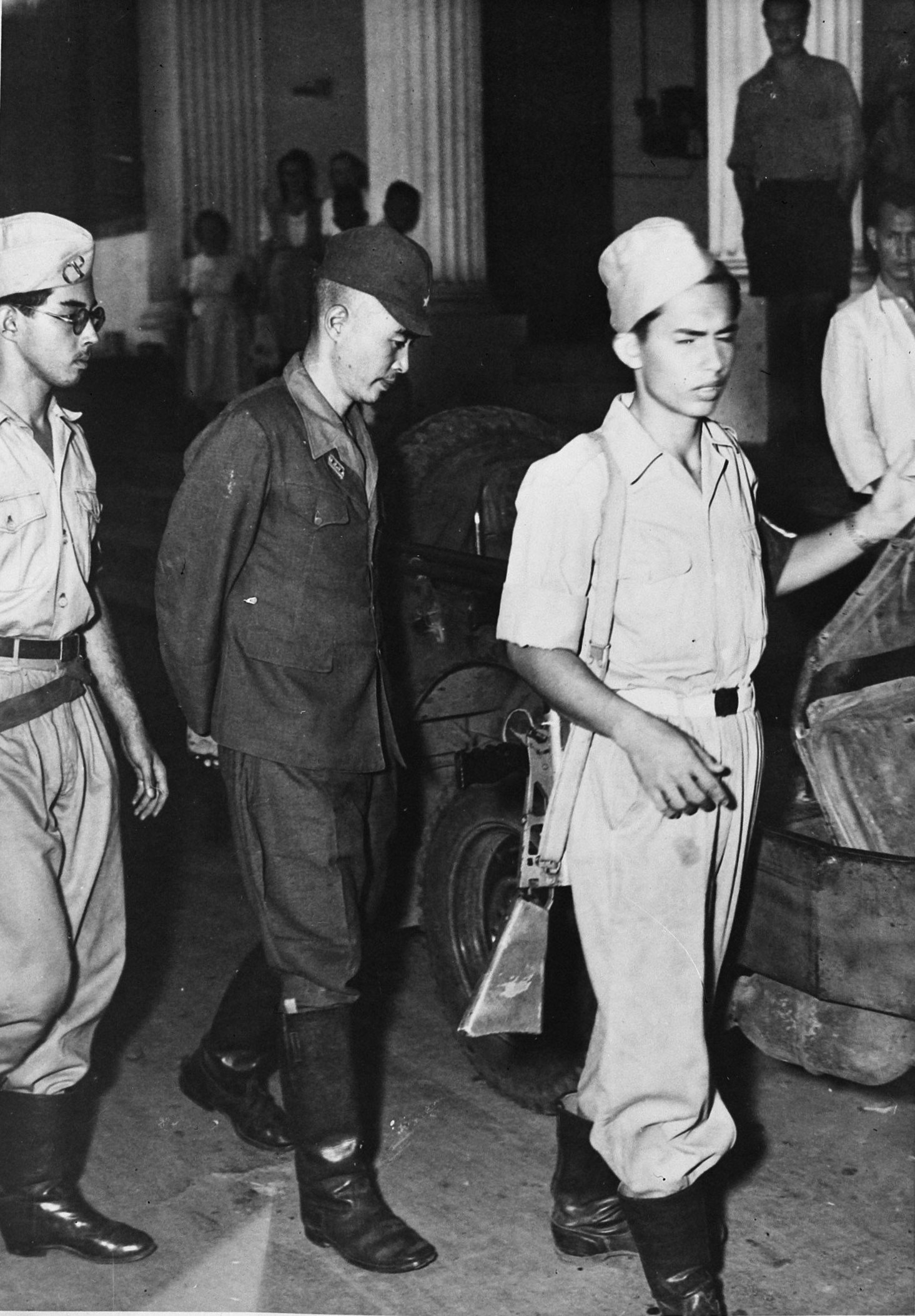
Japanese camp commander Captain Kenichi Sonei sentenced to death (1946)

Over time the Japanese reduced the size of the camp many times, while it was obliged to accommodate more prisoners. Initially there were about 2,000 women and children. At the end of the war the camp population was approximately 10,500. The area of land had been reduced to a quarter of its original size. Every bit of space was used for sleeping, including the unused kitchens and waterless bathrooms.

From April 1944 to June 1945 the camp was under the command of Captain Kenichi Sone. Sone was responsible for many atrocities. He was responsible for reduced food rations, head shavings and beatings. He organised 'kumpulans' or roll calls where women, children and the sick had to stand in the hot tropical sun for hours. After the war he was arrested and sentenced to death on September 2, 1946. The sentence was carried out by a Dutch firing squad on 7 December, after a request for pardon to the Dutch lieutenant governor-general, Hubertus van Mook, was rejected. Van Mook's wife had been one of Sone's prisoners.

After the nuclear attacks on Nagasaki and Hiroshima, Japan surrendered on 2 September 1945. On 16 September the International Red Cross had film recordings made of the women in Tjideng. The images were shown in Dutch cinemas on the Polygoon newsreel in the first week of December. These were the first post-war film images shown in the Netherlands from the Dutch East Indies.

== Report by Lieutenant-Colonel Read-Collins ==
When Allied Lieutenant-Colonel Read-Collins arrived at the camp after the Japanese capitulation, he witnessed the circumstances of the prisoners first-hand. His observations have been recorded in The Knights of Bushido: A History of Japanese War Crimes During World War II, by Lord Edward Russell, legal advisor of the Nuremberg trials and Tokyo tribunal.

He reported that most of the women showed little or no emotion. He observed emaciated children with an 'unhealthy pallor'. From all the camps he had seen, the women's camp at Tjideng was the worst.

"There were no amenities of any kind, no place for the children to play, and they could only take exercise in the narrow streets which, during the rainy season, were ankle deep in sewage from the septic tanks which had overflowed. (...) The most common diseases were deficiency diseases like [hunger] oedema and beriberi. Dysentery and malaria were also rampant, the first for obvious reasons, the second because the internees had no mosquito nets."

He noted the absence of food shortages in Batavia, in contrast to the situation in the camp:

"The principal item [of food] was an insufficient quantity of rice, sometimes a little meat, sour black bread made from tapioca flour, and a small quantity of obi leaves, the only vegetable. Immediately after the Japanese surrender the internees' rations were doubled. There had been no shortage of food in Batavia prior to the return of the Allies and [Lieutenant-Colonel] Read-Collins saw no signs of malnutrition amongst the local native population. On 18th September there were already twelve hundred patients in the camp hospital. There were many others who also should have been in hospital but who had carried on for the sake of their children. When those were all admitted the number of patients rose to two thousand, and every available building in Batavia was converted into a convalescent home. Many of the worst cases were evacuated to Singapore."

== Family reunions ==
After the liberation, the men who had survived the Japanese work camps came looking for their wives and children. One couple described the reunion:

"After the war I was transported to the Carolus hospital in Batavia with the children. I was in a room with six women. My husband came from Bandung looking for me. He looks around the room and at me. Then he says to the nun: 'Sister, my wife is not here'. So I called him, 'Paul!' I saw him close his eyes. Like: 'oh, no, that can't be true'. I must have looked horrible. A chest like a washboard. My weight was 35 kg and most of my hair had fallen out."

"I did not recognise the children either. The youngest was bloated with hunger oedema and had brown crusts on her head. The other had those spindly legs. The children hadn't grown at all in three years."

== Aftermath ==
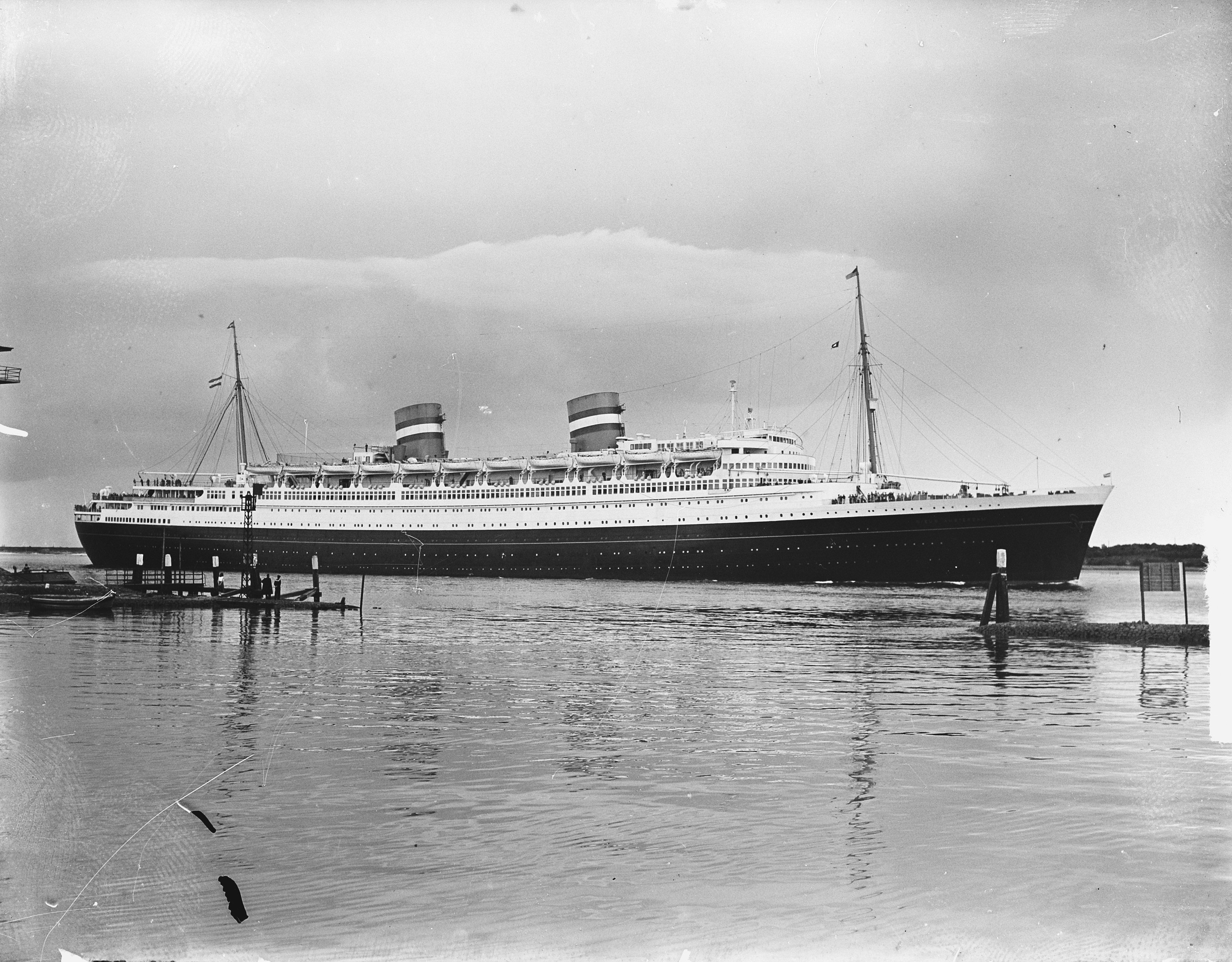
Many camp survivors died aboard the SS New Amsterdam on the way to the Netherlands

After the surrender of Japan, the violent Bersiap period began. The Indonesian word 'bersiap' means 'get ready' or 'be prepared'. In the power vacuum, Sukarno made his Proclamation of Indonesian Independence on 17 August 1945, which marked the start of the Indonesian National Revolution. Thousands of European and Eurasian people were killed by native Indonesians. Estimates of the number of Dutch civilian deaths as a result of the Bersiap range from 3,500 to 30,000. The former Japanese internment camps became safe havens.

In December 1945, 3,800 camp survivors, including 1,200 children, were repatriated to the Netherlands on board the SS New Amsterdam. The children were weak after spending years in the Japanese internment camps. Measles broke out aboard the ship, and many of the children died. The dead were buried at sea.

On 27 December 1949 Queen Juliana of the Netherlands signed the treaty that transferred sovereignty to Indonesia.

== Repatriation to the Netherlands ==
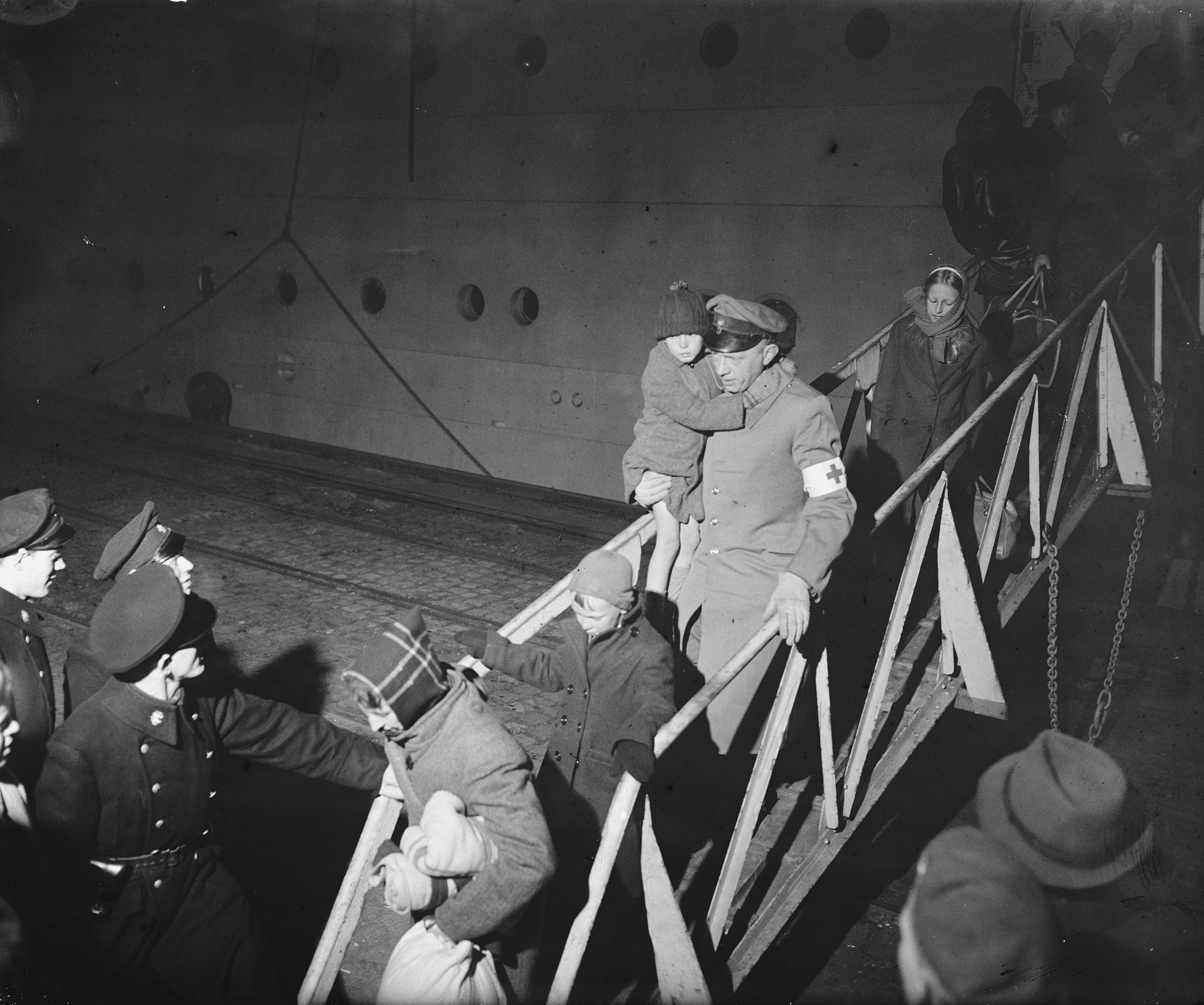
SS Almanzora arrives at the port of Amsterdam with 1900 people from the Dutch East Indies (3 January 1946)

Many immigrants from the Dutch East Indies had never been to the Netherlands. They had often lost their belongings during the Japanese occupation or had to leave their possessions behind. The Netherlands was struggling with housing shortages and unemployment. Some people arriving from the Dutch East Indies were temporarily housed in former WWII labor camps, such as Westerbork transit camp. The Dutch government initially tried to prevent immigration from the Dutch East Indies, but as the situation in the colony deteriorated, immigrants were admitted to the country under strict conditions. The traumatic experiences in the Japanese camps or Bersiap period were often not addressed or discussed.

== In the literature ==
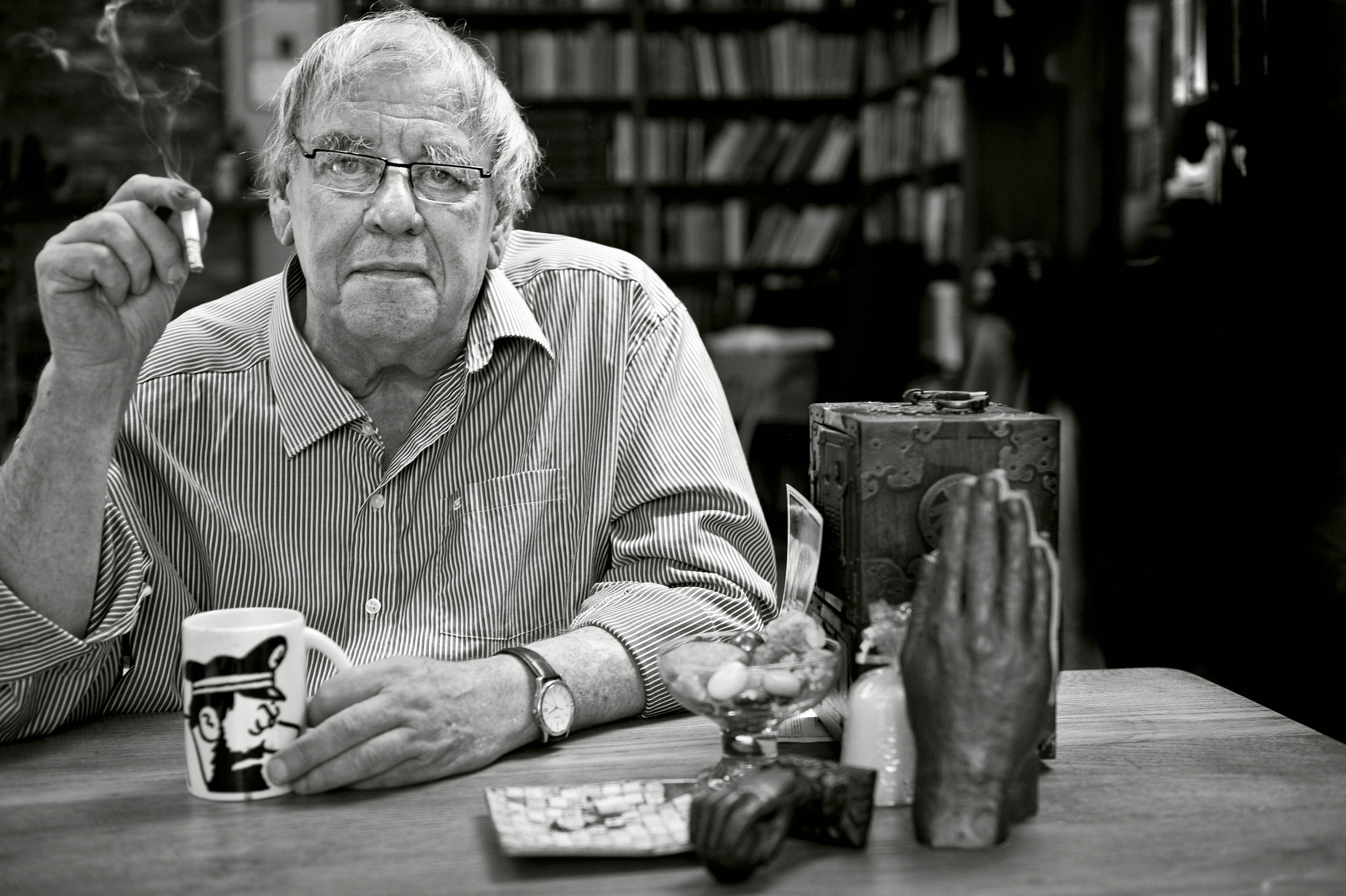
Dutch writer Jeroen Brouwers (2010)

Dutch author Jeroen Brouwers describes his childhood experience in the camp, and its later effects, in the 1986 autobiographical novel Bezonken Rood, translated into English as Sunken Red. The French translation won the Prix Femina literature prize in 1995.

Clara Olink Kelly in her 2003 book The Flamboya Tree, and Boudewijn van Oort in his 2008 Tjideng Reunion, write about life and the conditions in the camp, and van Oort also describes in some detail the military and diplomatic background. Henri Charles Schmid recounts the life of his mother during her imprisonment in the Tjideng camp in his 2014 book Scattered Journey. Robine Andrau in her 2015 book Bowing to the Emperor: We Were Captives in WWII, coauthored with her mother, describes both their experience in the camp and her father's experience as a prisoner of war in Japan.

"My mother too, was beaten, shorn, and made to stand in the roll call square for twenty-four hours. I saw her there. Who knows what was done to her that I did not see. In our house in the camp I go into the front room one day where Nettie Stenvert lives. Nettie Stenvert's mother is lying on her back on a table, with no clothes on, her legs up and spread out. Between her legs stands a Jap who has let down his trousers, so that I roar with laughter because this really is the funniest thing I have ever seen, though in the course of my camp years I shall see it several more times in various ways, but then I will not laugh." (From: Jeroen Brouwers, Sunken Red)

== Dutch celebrities interned at Tjideng ==
- Christel Adelaar
- Jeroen Brouwers
- Tonke Dragt
- Boudewijn de Groot (his mother died in Tjideng when he was one year old)
- Teun Koolhaas
- Aarnout Loudon
- Petronella Rutte-Dilling, first wife of Izaäk Rutte. Izaäk is the father of former Prime Minister of the Netherlands, Mark Rutte. Petronella died in Tjideng on 20 July 1945.
