= Rem Koolhaas =

Dutch architect (born 1944)

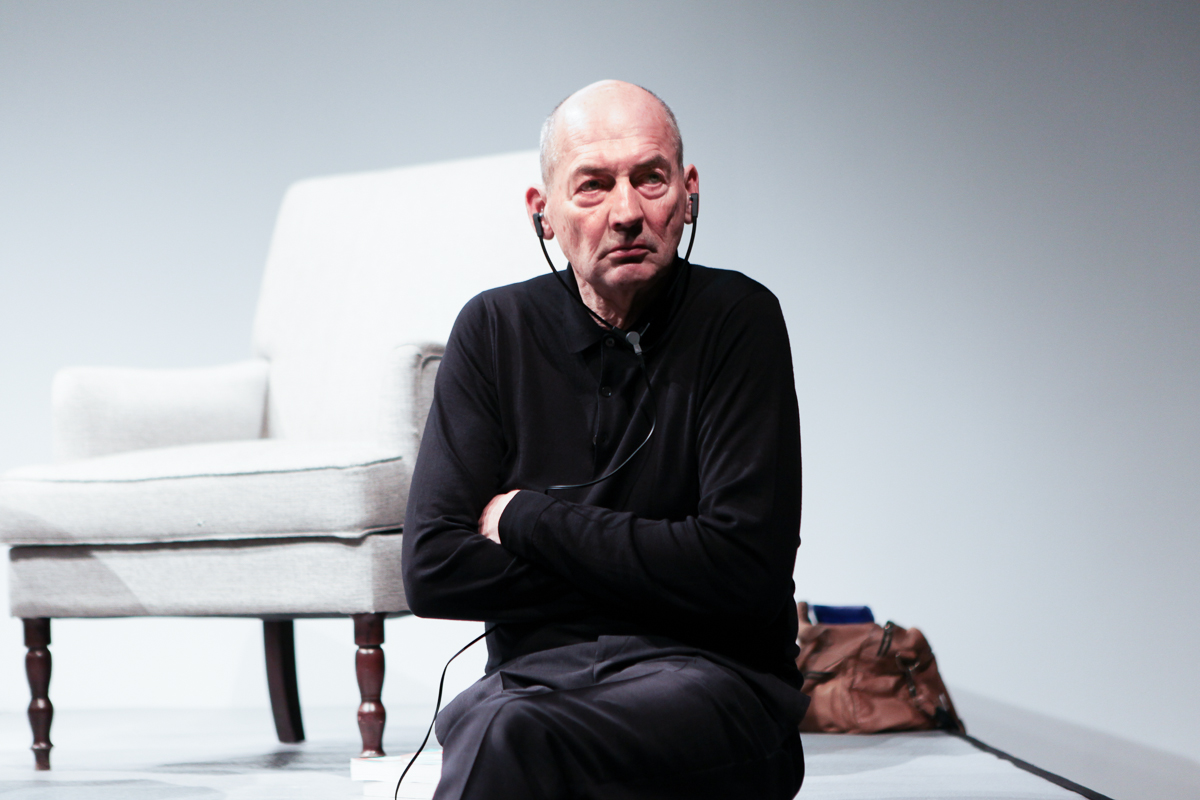
- Koolhaas in 2013
- Born: Remment Lucas Koolhaas; 17 November 1944 (age 81); Rotterdam, Netherlands
- Education: Architectural Association School of Architecture; Cornell University
- Occupations: Architect; Architectural theorist Urbanist
- Awards: Pritzker Prize (2000); Praemium Imperiale (2003); Royal Gold Medal (2004); Leone d'oro alla carriera (2010); Rolf Schock Prize (2022)
- Practice: Office for Metropolitan Architecture
- Buildings: Casa da Música in Porto; De Rotterdam; Seattle Central Library; Netherlands Embassy Berlin; China Central Television Headquarters; Qatar National Library
- Projects: Delirious New York, S,M,L,XL; Volume Magazine

Remment Lucas Koolhaas (Dutch: [rɛm ˈkoːlɦaːs]; born 17 November 1944) is a Dutch architect, architectural theorist, urbanist, and Professor in Practice of Architecture and Urban Design at the Graduate School of Design at Harvard University. He is often cited as a representative of deconstructivism and is the author of Delirious New York: A Retroactive Manifesto for Manhattan.

He is seen by some as one of the significant architectural thinkers and urbanists of his generation, by others as a self-important iconoclast. In 2000, Rem Koolhaas won the Pritzker Prize. In 2008, Time put him in their top 100 of The World's Most Influential People. He was elected to the American Philosophical Society in 2014.

== Early life and career ==
Remment Koolhaas was born on 17 November 1944 in Rotterdam, Netherlands, to Anton Koolhaas (1912–1992) and Selinde Pietertje Roosenburg (born 1920). His father was a novelist, critic, and screenwriter. His maternal grandfather, Dirk Roosenburg (1887–1962), was a modernist architect who worked for Hendrik Petrus Berlage, before opening his own practice. Rem Koolhaas has a brother, Thomas, and a sister, Annabel. His paternal cousin was the architect and urban planner Teun Koolhaas (1940–2007). The family lived consecutively in Rotterdam (until 1946), Amsterdam (1946–1952), Jakarta (1952–1955), and Amsterdam (from 1955).

His father strongly supported the Indonesian cause for autonomy from the colonial Dutch in his writing. When the war of independence was won, he was invited over to run a cultural programme for three years and the family moved to Jakarta in 1952. "It was a very important age for me," Koolhaas recalls "and I really lived as an Asian."

In 1969, Koolhaas co-wrote The White Slave, a Dutch film noir, and later wrote an unproduced script for American soft-porn king Russ Meyer.

In 1963 at age 19, he was a journalist for the Haagse Post before starting studies in architecture in 1968 at the Architectural Association School of Architecture in London. In 1972, he received a Commonwealth Fund (Harkness) Fellowship to study with Oswald Mathias Ungers at Cornell University in Ithaca, New York, followed by studies at the Institute for Architecture and Urban Studies in New York City.

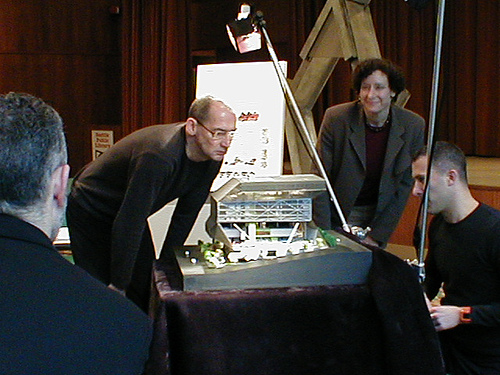
Rem Koolhaas inspecting the Seattle Central Library model in 2005

Koolhaas first came to public and critical attention with OMA (The Office for Metropolitan Architecture), the office he founded in 1975 together with architects Elia Zenghelis, Zoe Zenghelis and Madelon Vriesendorp in London. They were later joined by one of Koolhaas's students, Zaha Hadid – who would soon go on to achieve success in her own right. An early work which would mark their difference from the then dominant postmodern classicism of the late 1970s, was their contribution to the Venice Biennale of 1980, curated by Italian architect Paolo Portoghesi, titled "The Presence of the Past". Each architect had to design a stage-like "frontage" to a Potemkin-type internal street; the façades by Costantino Dardi, Frank Gehry and OMA were the only ones that did not employ Post-Modern architecture motifs or historical references.

Other early critically received (yet unbuilt) projects included the Parc de la Villette, Paris (1982) and the residence for the Prime Minister of Ireland (1979), as well as the Kunsthal in Rotterdam (1992). These schemes would attempt to put into practice many of the findings Koolhaas made in his book Delirious New York (1978), which was written while he was a visiting scholar at the Institute for Architecture and Urban Studies in New York, directed by Peter Eisenman.

== Architectural theory ==
=== Delirious New York ===
Koolhaas's book Delirious New York set the pace for his career. Koolhaas analyzes the "chance-like" nature of city life: "The City is an addictive machine from which there is no escape" "Rem Koolhaas...defined the city as a collection of 'red hot spots'." (Anna Klingmann). As Koolhaas himself has acknowledged, this approach had already been evident in the Japanese Metabolist Movement in the 1960s and early 1970s.

A key aspect of architecture that Koolhaas interrogates is the "program": with the rise of modernism in the 20th century the "Program" became the key theme of architectural design. The notion of the Program involves "an act to edit function and human activities" as the pretext of architectural design: epitomised in the maxim form follows function, first popularised by architect Louis Sullivan at the beginning of the 20th century. The notion was first questioned in Delirious New York, in his analysis of high-rise architecture in Manhattan. An early design method derived from such thinking was "cross-programming", introducing unexpected functions in room programmes, such as running tracks in skyscrapers. More recently, Koolhaas unsuccessfully proposed the inclusion of hospital units for the homeless into the Seattle Public Library project (2003).

=== Project on the city ===
Koolhaas' next publications were a by-product of his position as professor at Harvard University, in the Design school's "Project on the City"; firstly the 720-page Mutations, followed by The Harvard Design School Guide to Shopping (2002) and The Great Leap Forward (2002).

All three books published student work analysing what others would regard as "non-cities", sprawling conglomerates such as Lagos in Nigeria, west Africa, which the authors argue are highly functional despite a lack of infrastructure. The authors also examine the influence of shopping habits and the recent rapid growth of cities in China. Critics of the books have criticised Koolhaas for being cynical, – as if Western capitalism and globalization demolish all cultural identity – highlighted in the notion expounded in the books that "In the end, there will be little else for us to do but shop". Perhaps such caustic cynicism can be read as a "realism" about the transformation of cultural life, where airports and even museums (due to finance problems) rely just as much on operating gift shops. It does, however, demonstrate one of the architect's characteristic devices for deflecting criticism: attack the client or subject of study after completing the work.

When it comes to transforming these observations into practice, Koolhaas mobilizes what he regards as the omnipotent forces of urbanism into unique design forms and connections organised along the lines of present-day society. Koolhaas continuously incorporates his observations of the contemporary city within his design activities: calling such a condition the ‘culture of congestion’. Again, shopping is examined for "intellectual comfort", whilst the unregulated taste and densification of Chinese cities is analysed according to "performance", a criterion involving variables with debatable credibility: density, newness, shape, size, money etc.

In 2003, Content, a 544-page magazine-style book designed by &&& Creative and published by Koolhaas, gives an overview of the last decade of OMA projects including his designs for the Prada shops, the Seattle Public Library, a plan to save Cambridge from Harvard by rechanneling the Charles River, Lagos' future as Earth's third-biggest city, as well as interviews with Martha Stewart and Robert Venturi and Denise Scott Brown.

=== Volume ===
In 2005, Rem Koolhaas co-founded Volume Magazine together with Mark Wigley and Ole Bouman. Volume Magazine – the collaborative project by Archis (Amsterdam), AMO and C-lab (Columbia University NY) – is a dynamic experimental think tank devoted to the process of spatial and cultural reflexivity. It goes beyond architecture's definition of ‘making buildings’ and reaches out for global views on architecture and design, broader attitudes to social structures, and creating environments to live in. The magazine stands for a journalism which detects and anticipates, is proactive and even pre-emptive – a journalism which uncovers potentialities, rather than covering done deals.

=== Other analysis ===
Koolhaas coined the phrase "generic city" to refer to purpose-built new towns in southeast Asia. According to Koolhaas, such a city is "a reflection of present need and present ability. It is big enough for everybody. It is easy, it does not need maintenance. If it gets too small it just expands. If it gets old it self destructs and renews. It is equally exciting -- or unexciting -- everywhere. It can produce a new identity every Monday morning."

== Buildings and projects ==
In the late 1990s he worked on the design for the new headquarters for Universal.

Online marketing and publicity has been a hallmark of OMA's rise in the current century. It has also led to criticism, such as the critique by New York Magazine critic Justin Davidson, who found the 2020 Guggenheim exhibition Countryside, the Future "mildly amusing if it weren’t such terrible waste — of attention, of gallery square footage, of resources, talent, and expertise. Bored with being an architect and building things, Koolhaas lets his fingertips graze important topics, genuine insights, and actual lives. He treats them all as ironic bric-a-brac, meaningless souvenirs of his meanderings through a fragile world. How frustrating that the Guggenheim couldn’t force a little more intellectual rigor on this romp."

=== Architecture, fashion, and theatre ===
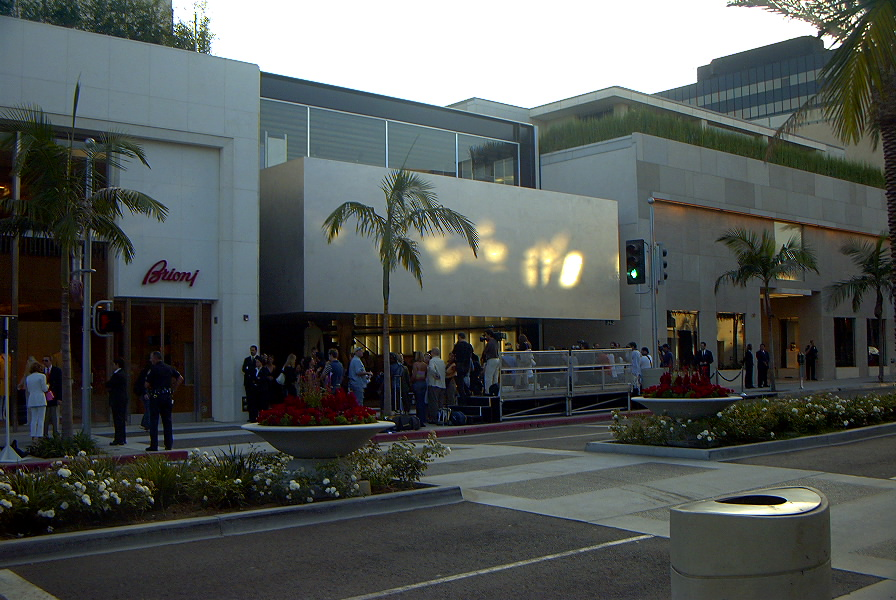
Prada, Beverly Hills, California

The central space of Koolhaas' Beverly Hills Prada store is occupied by a massive central staircase, ostensibly displaying select wares, but mainly the shoppers themselves. The notion of selling a brand rather than marketing clothes was further emphasised in the Prada store on Broadway in Manhattan, New York, which had previously been owned by the Guggenheim: the museum signs were not removed during the outfitting of the new store, as if emphasizing the premises as a cultural institution. The Broadway Prada store opened in December 2001, cost €32 million to build, and has 2,300 square meters of retail space.

=== 21st-century projects ===
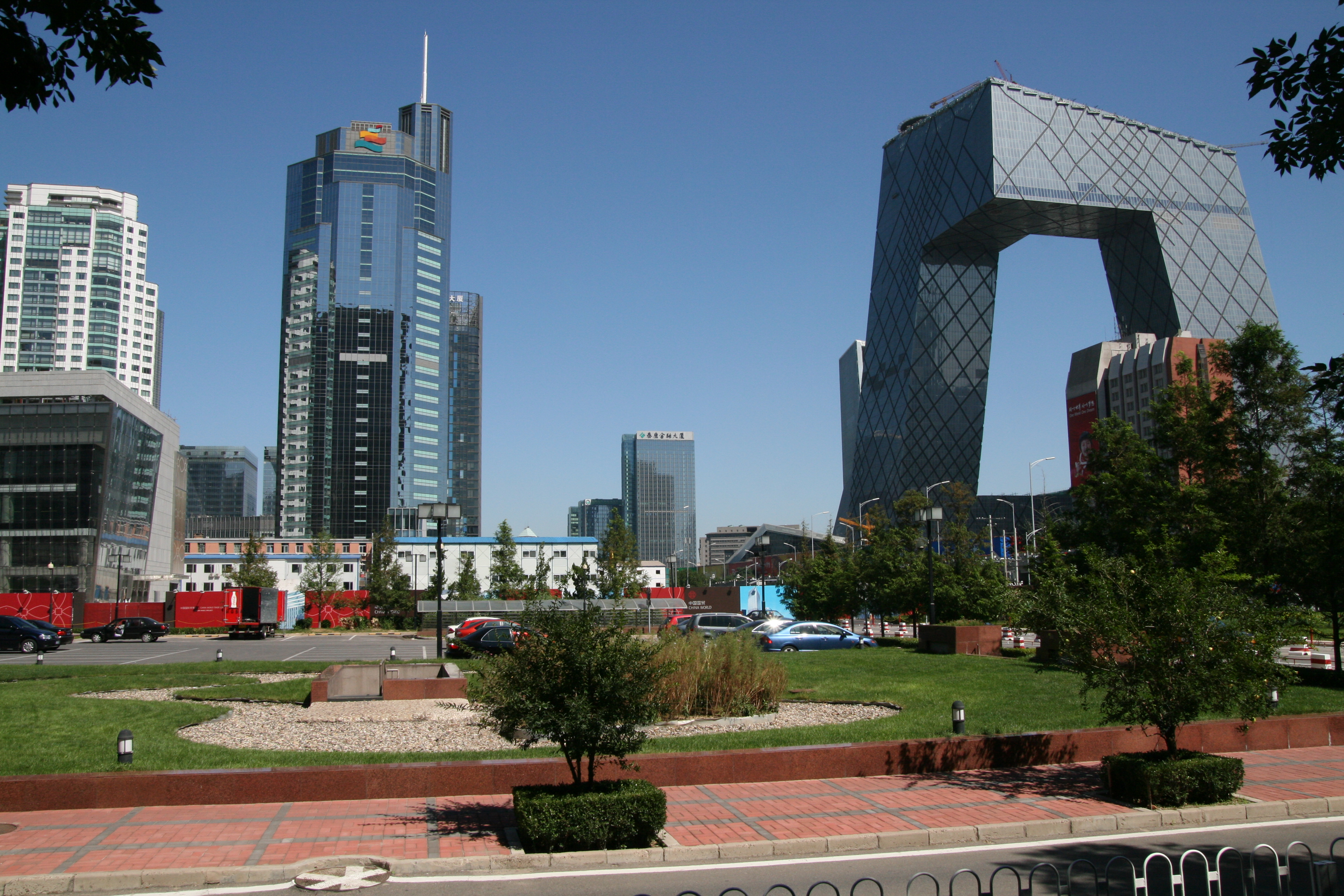
CCTV Headquarters, Beijing, China

One of the most costly OMA projects of the new century were the massive Central China Television Headquarters Building in Beijing, China, and the new building for the Shenzhen Stock Exchange.

In 2001 or 2002 Koolhaas proposed a flag for the European Union dubbed, the, "barcode flag".

Proposal for a barcode flag for the European Union, 2002.

In his design for the new CCTV Headquarters in Beijing (2009), Koolhaas did not opt for the stereotypical skyscraper, often used to symbolize and landmark such government enterprises; he patented a "horizontal skyscraper" in the U.S. The building, popularly called "The Big Pants" by Beijing residents, was designed as a series of volumes which attempt to tie together the numerous departments onto the nebulous site, but also introduce routes (again, the concept of cross-programming) for the general public through the site, allowing them some degree of access to the production procedure. An unfortunate incident that highlighted the folly of the circulation scheme (no effective fire egress for people on the upper floors), was the construction fire that nearly destroyed the building and a nearby hotel in 2009. In discussions of his design, Koolhaas has expressed his optimism for socialist development in China and critiqued the capitalist system for leading to architectural failure through its decentralizing of large organizations and discouragement of communication.

In February 2020, his exhibition Countryside, The Future opened at the Guggenheim in New York City. The exhibition closed within a month, after New York City closed all its major art institutions in connection with the COVID-19 pandemic.

== Personal life ==
Koolhaas was previously married to Madelon Vriesendorp, an artist who is the mother of his two children, Charlie, a photographer, and Tomas, a filmmaker. Koolhaas divorced Vriesendorp in 2012. He has known his current partner Petra Blaisse, an interior and landscape designer, since 1986.

== Selected projects ==
- Villa dall’Ava, (Saint-Cloud, 1991)
- Nexus World Housing (Fukuoka, 1991)
- Kunsthal (Rotterdam, 1992)
- Euralille (Lille, 1994)
- Educatorium (Utrecht, 1995)
- Maison à Bordeaux (Bordeaux, 1998)
- Embassy of the Netherlands (Berlin, 2003)
- McCormick Tribune Campus Center (Chicago, 2003)
- Seoul National University Museum of Art (Seoul, 2005)
- Seattle Central Library (Seattle, 2005)
- Casa da Música (Porto, 2005)
- Dee and Charles Wyly Theater (Dallas, 2009)
- CCTV Headquarters, (Beijing, 2012)
- De Rotterdam (Rotterdam, 2013)
- Garage Museum of Contemporary Art (Moscow, 2014)
- Qatar National Library (Doha, 2017)
- Taipei Performing Arts Center (Taipei, 2022)

== Gallery ==
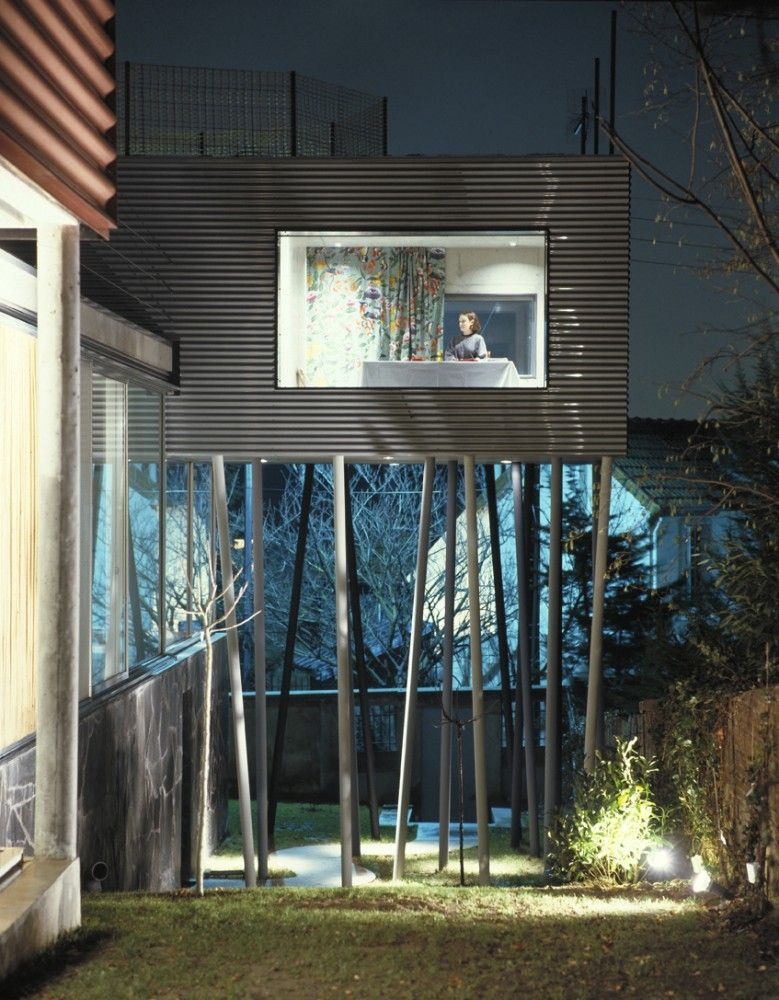
Villa dall'Ava, Paris, France, OMA

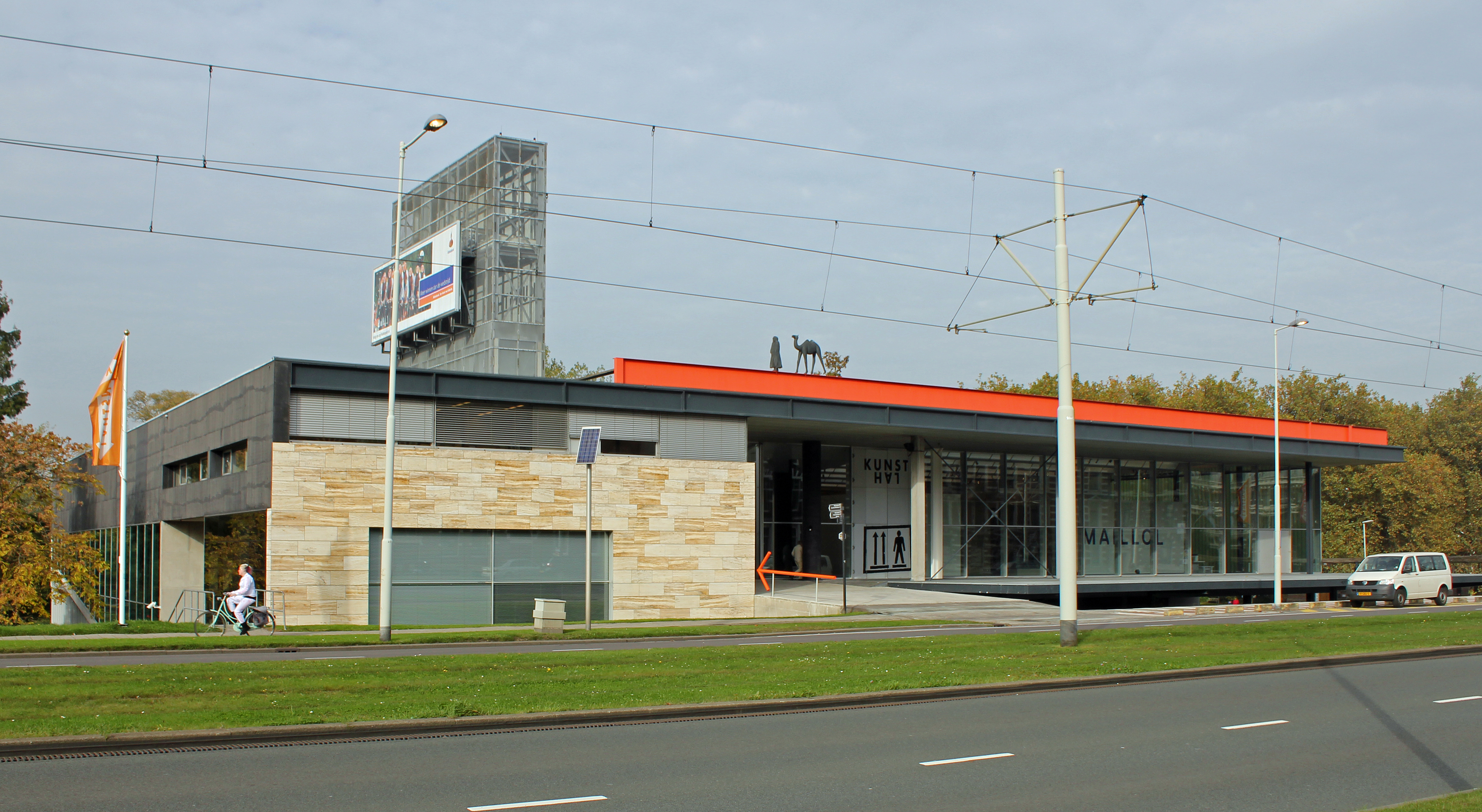
Kunsthal, Rotterdam, The Netherlands, OMA

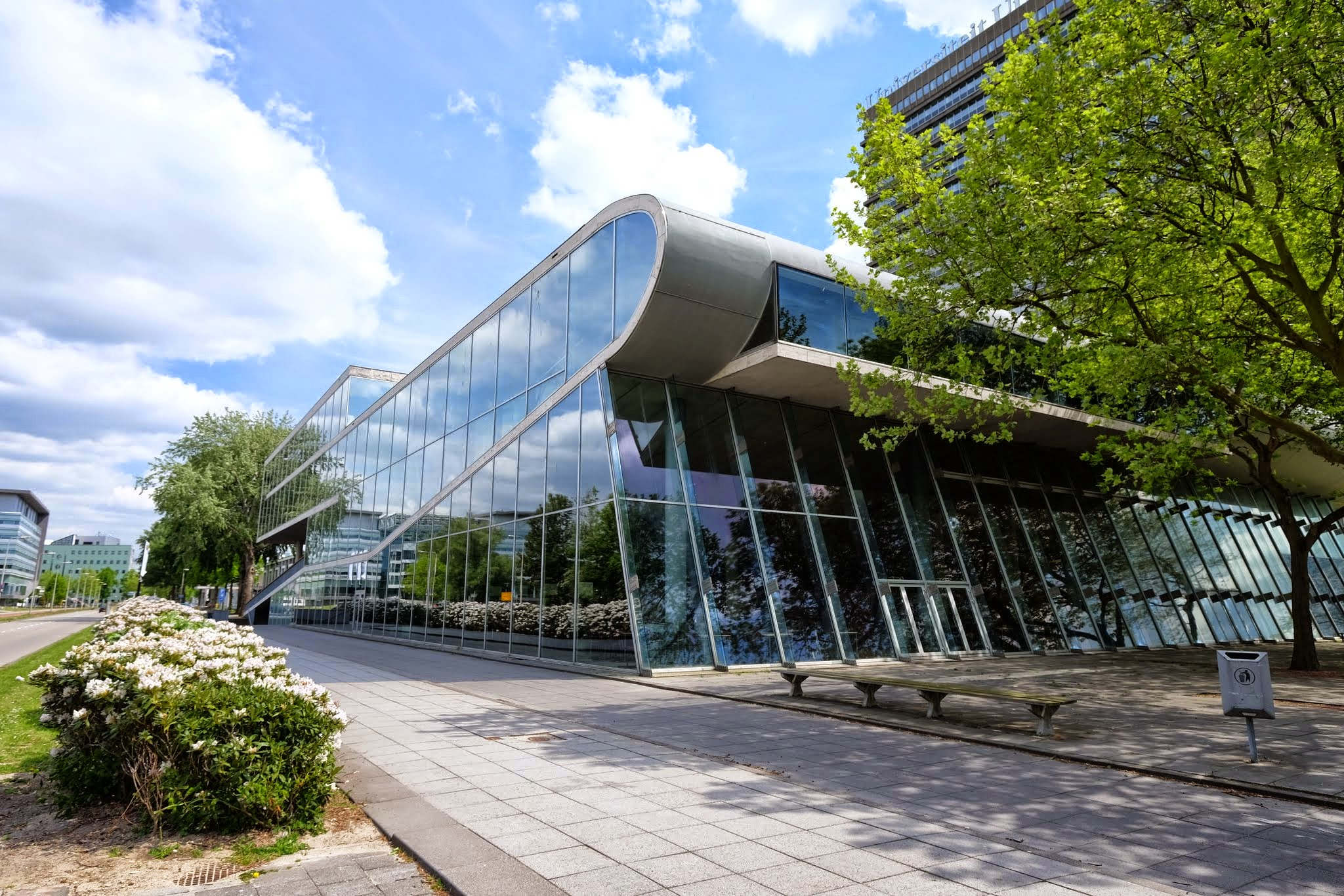
Educatorium, Utrecht, The Netherlands, OMA

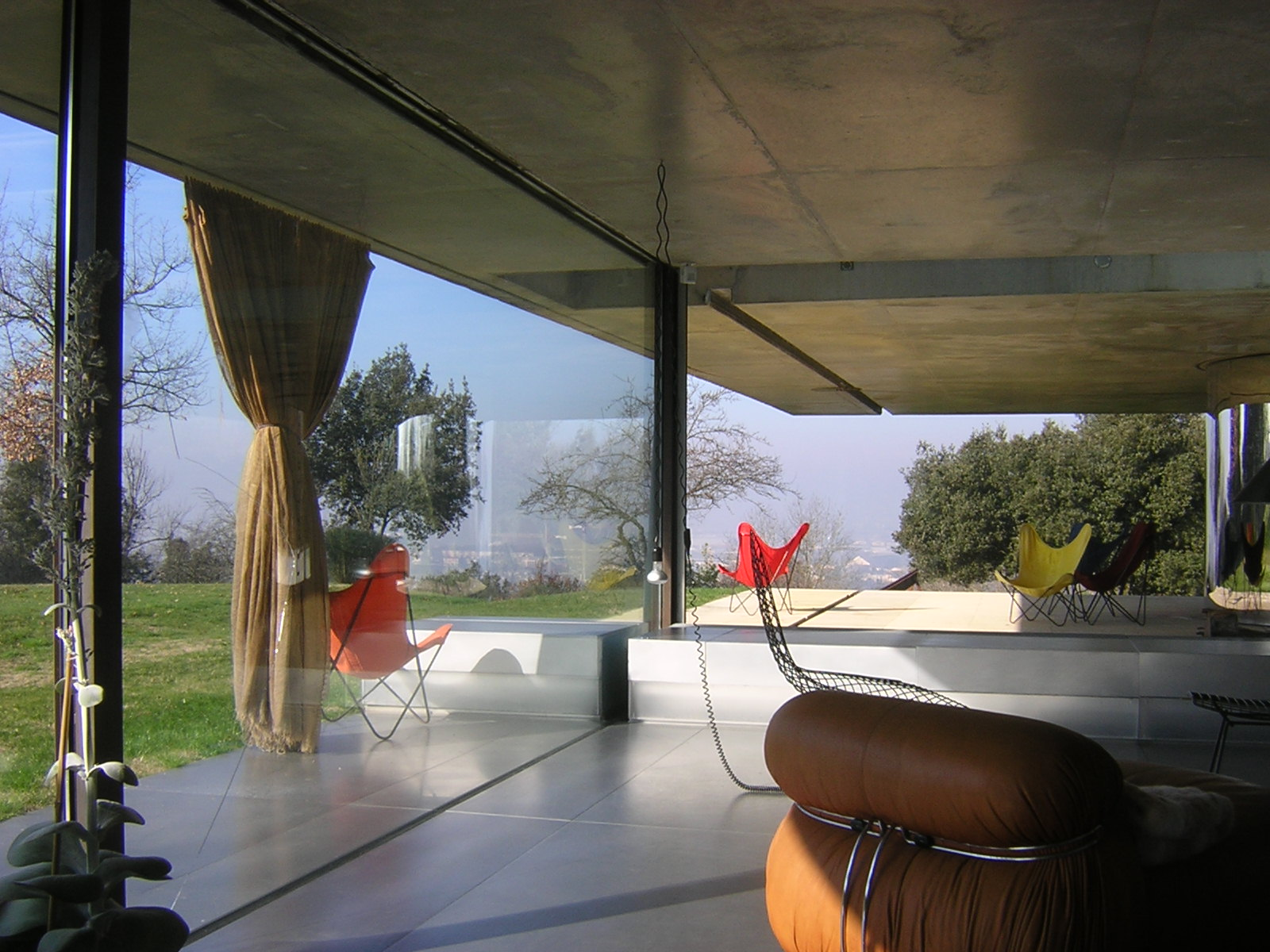
Maison à Bordeaux, France, OMA

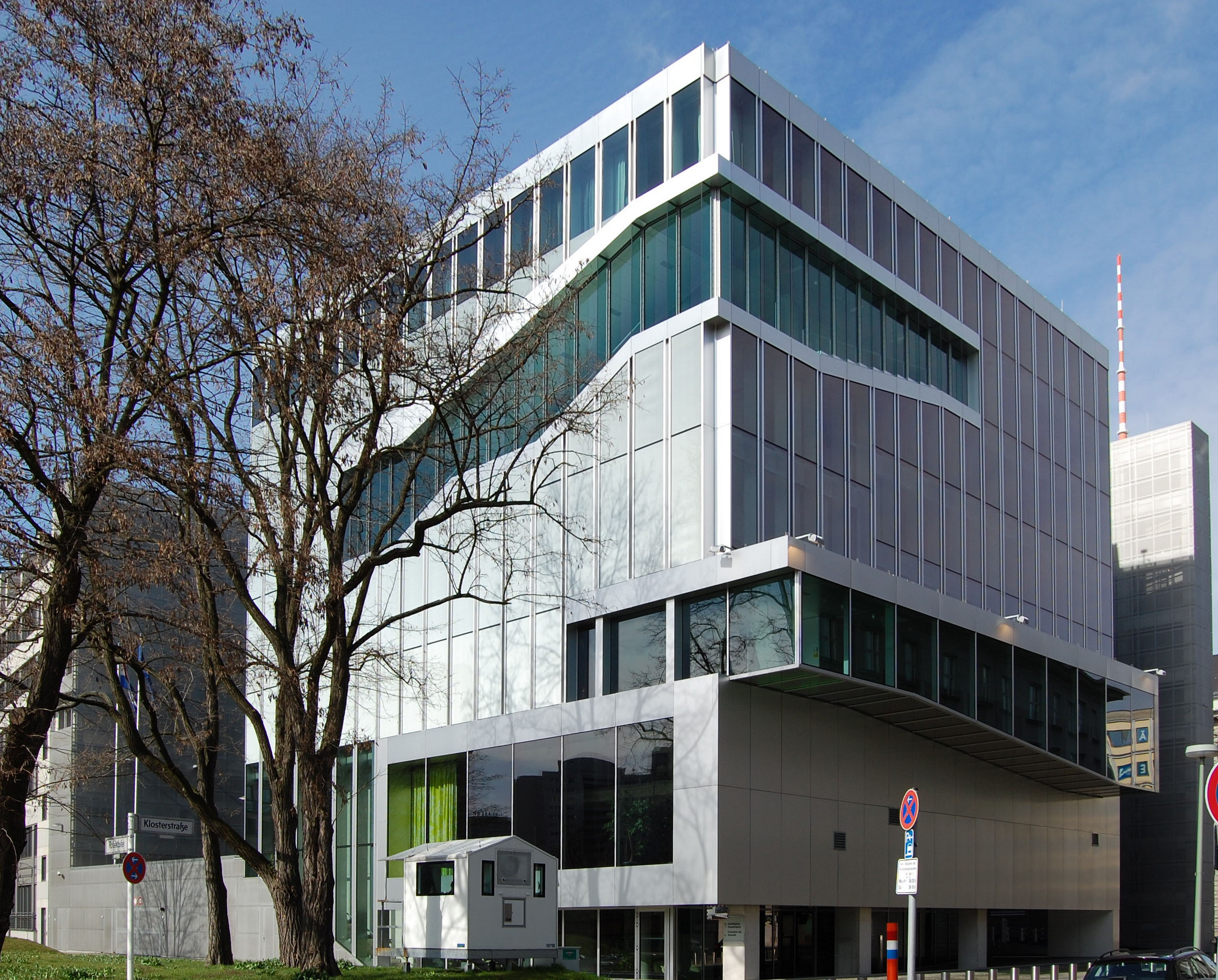
Embassy of the Netherlands, Berlin, Germany, OMA

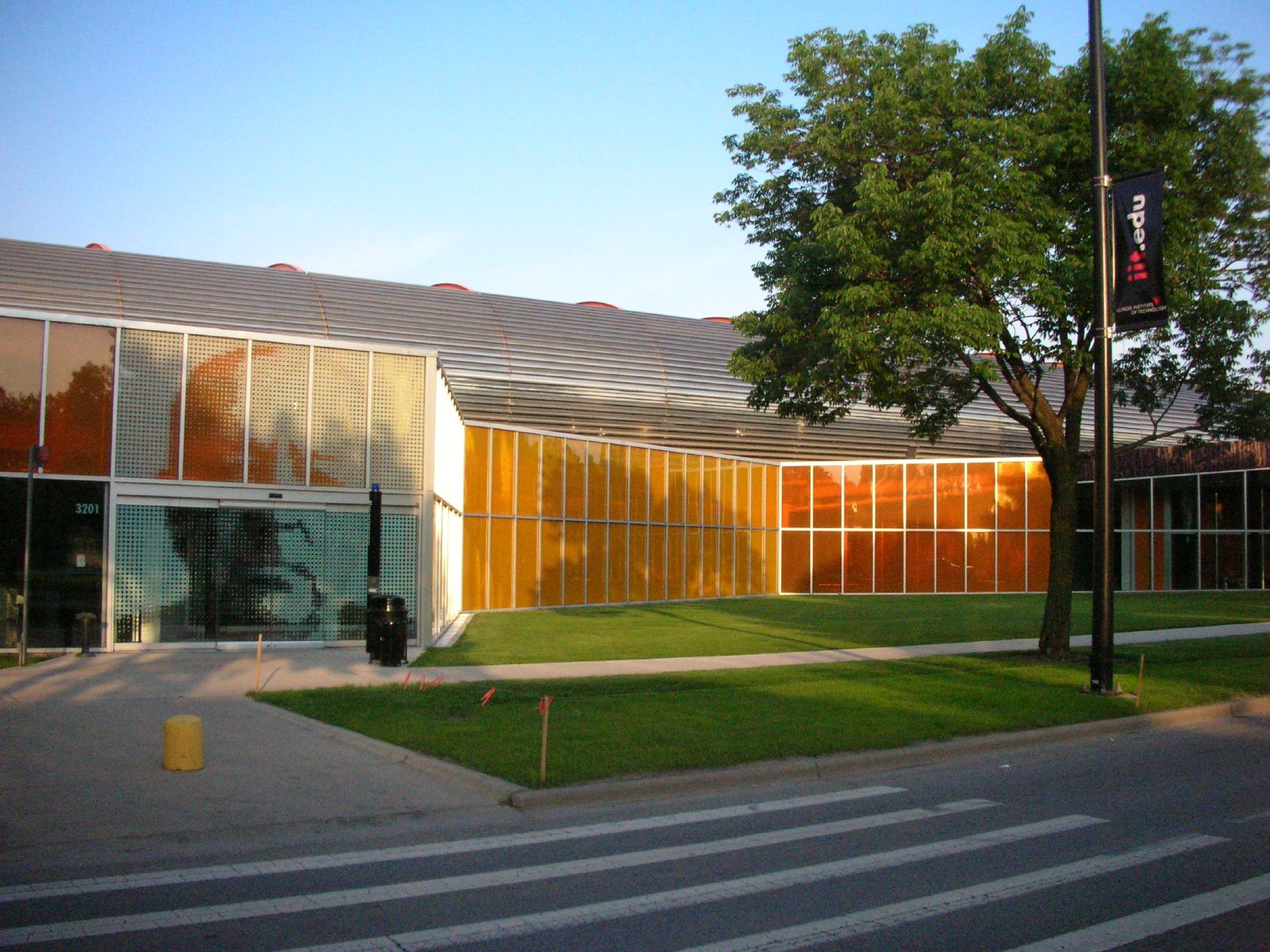
McCormick Tribune Campus Center, Chicago, United States, OMA

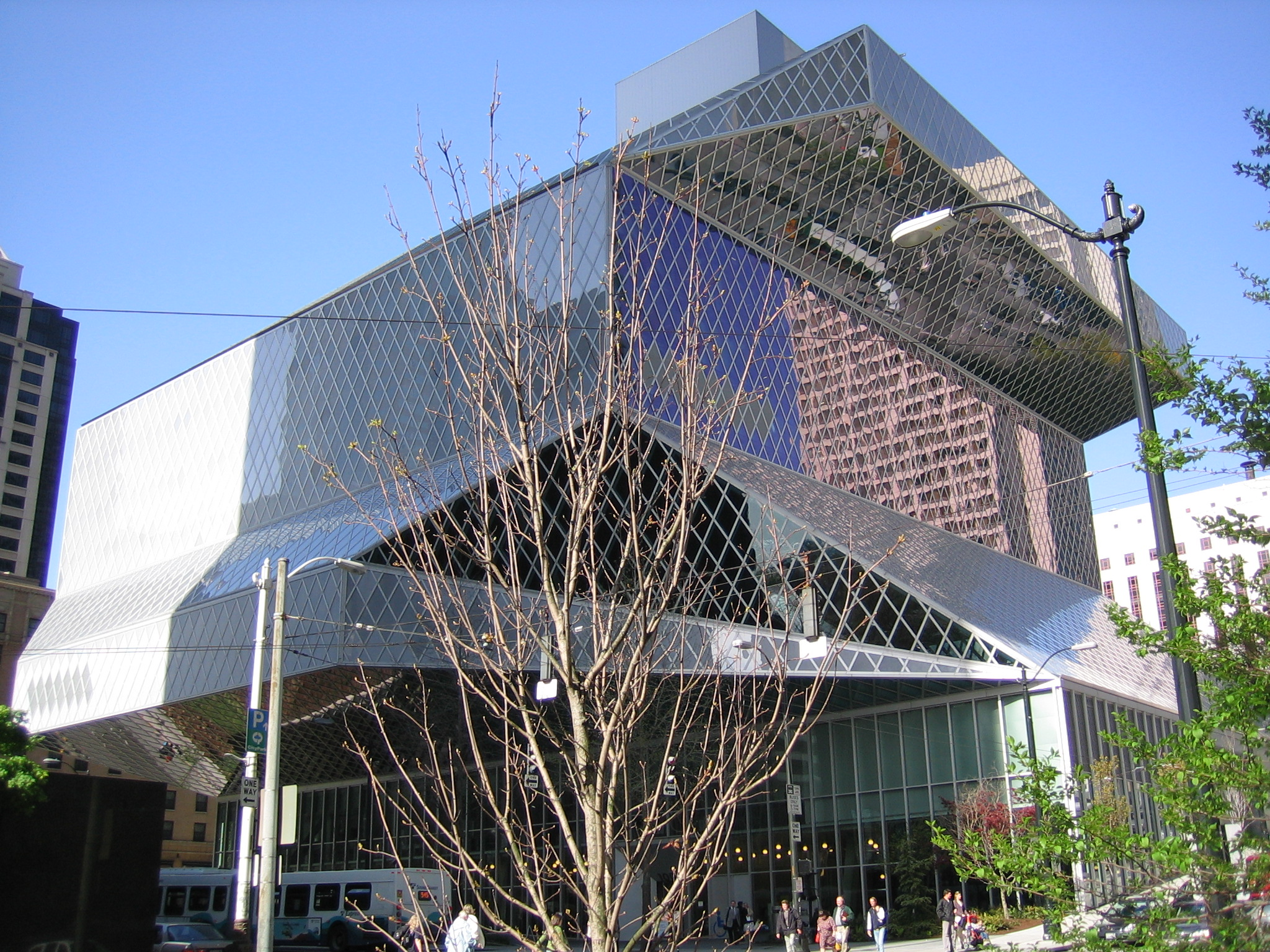
Seattle Central Library, Seattle, United States, OMA

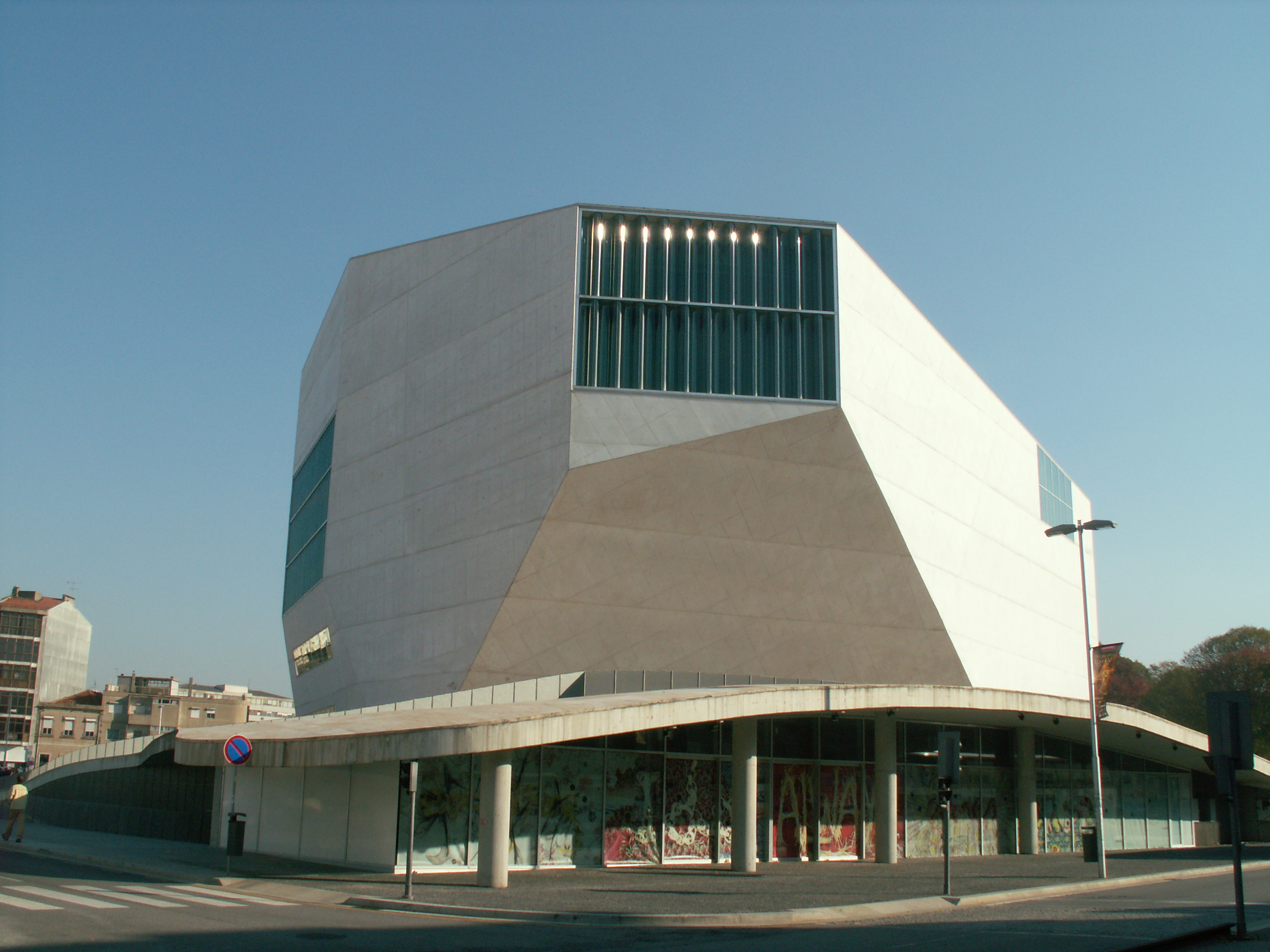
Casa da Música, Porto, Portugal, OMA

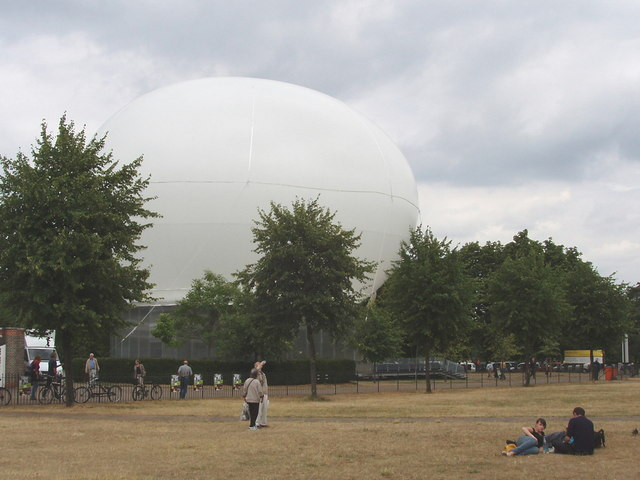
Serpentine Gallery Pavilion, London, UK, OMA

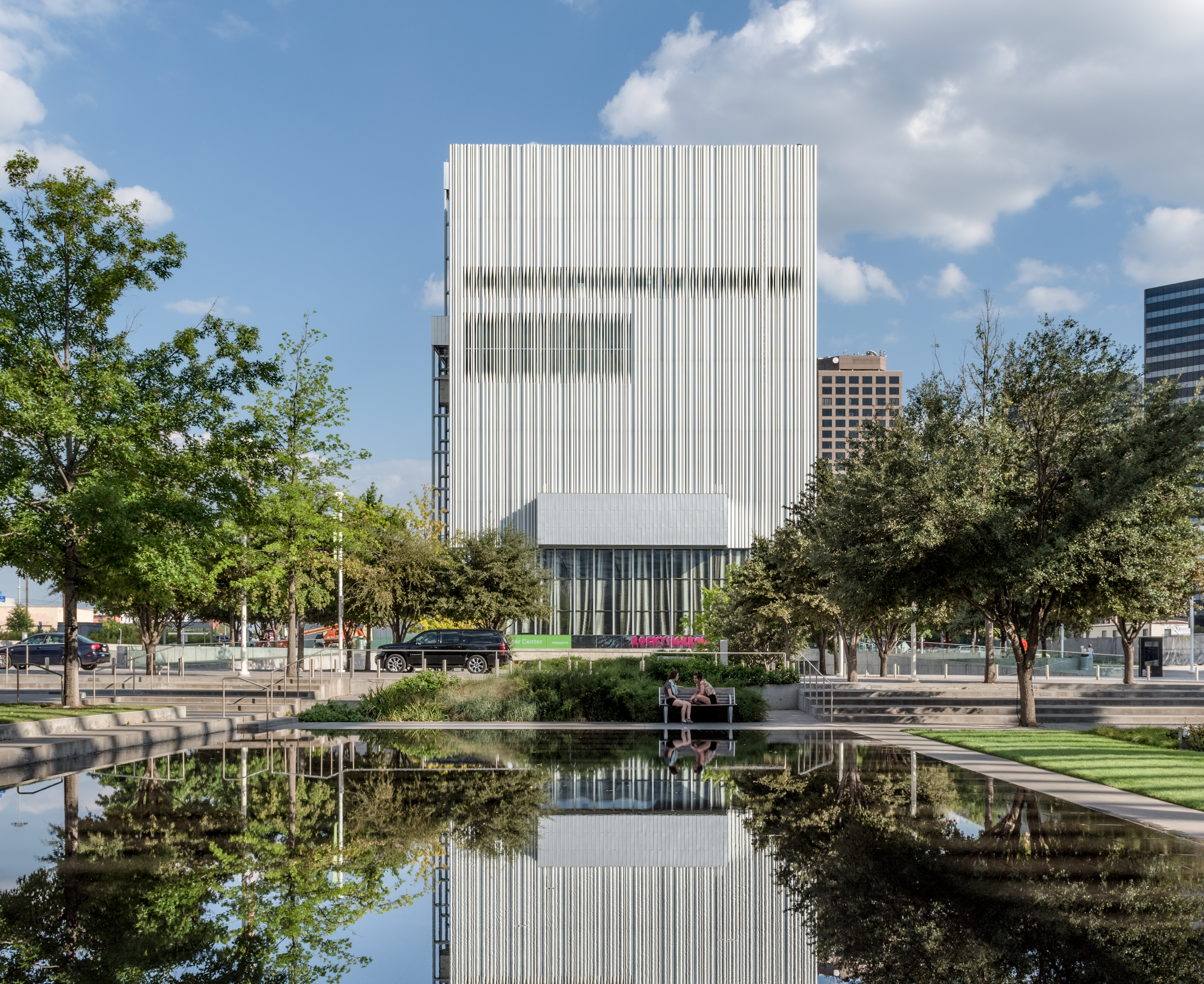
Dee and Charles Wyly Theater, Dallas, US, OMA

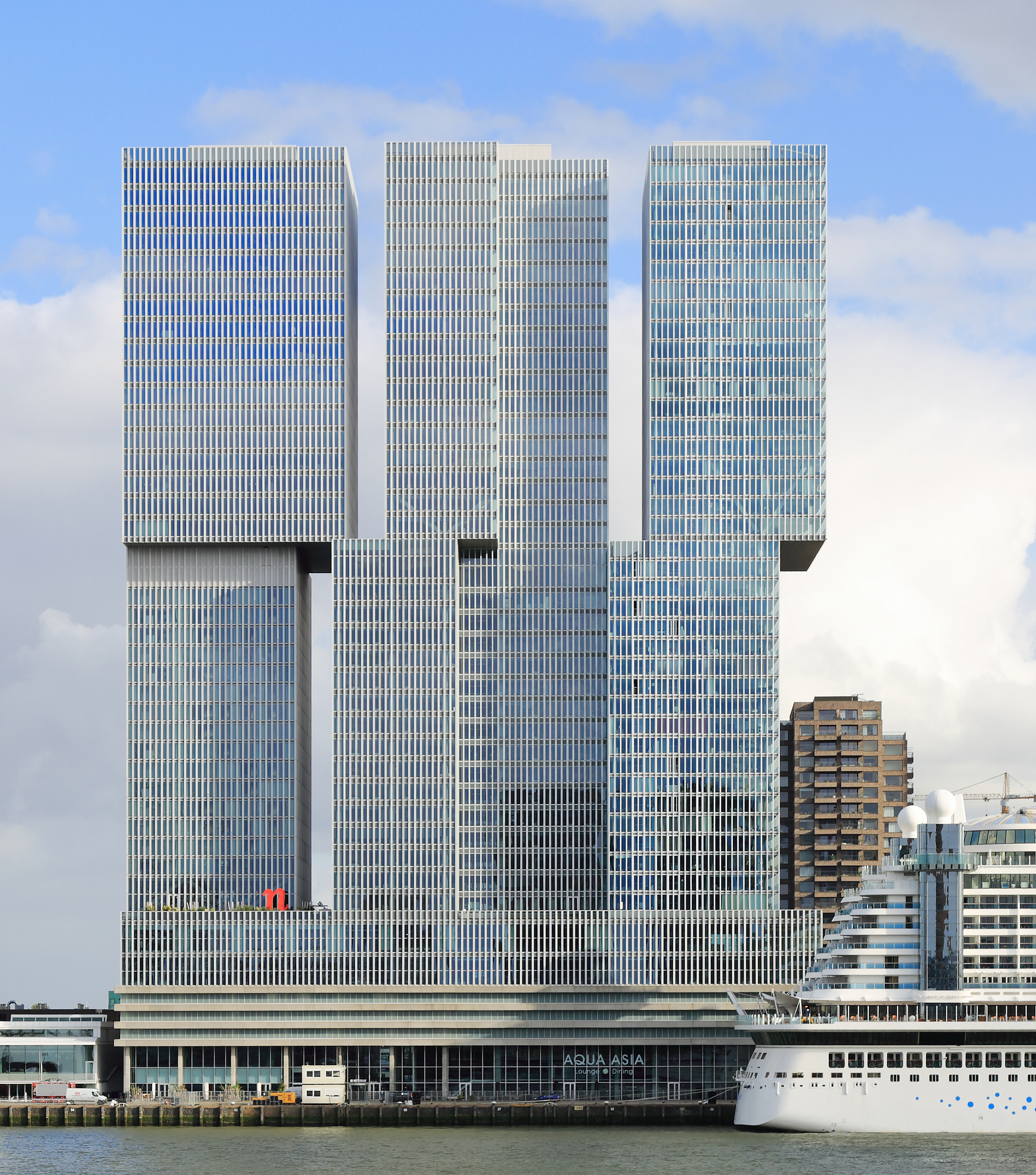
De Rotterdam, Rotterdam, The Netherlands, OMA

== Bibliography ==
- Project Japan. Metabolism Talks... (2011) (with Hans Ulrich Obrist) ISBN 978-3-8365-2508-4
- Delirious New York: A Retroactive Manifesto for Manhattan (1978) ISBN 978-1-885254-00-9
- S,M,L,XL (1995) ISBN 978-1-885254-86-3
- Serpentine Gallery: 24 Hour Interview Marathon (2007) ISBN 978-1-904563-69-3
- Living Vivre Leben (1998)
- Content (2004) ISBN 978-3-8228-3070-3
- Serpentine Gallery Pavilion 2006; Verlag der Buchhandlung Walther König, Köln, Germany 2008 ISBN 978-3-86560-393-7

== See also ==
- Contemporary architecture
- World Architecture Survey
- List of architects
- Koolhaas Houselife
