= Elia Zenghelis =

Greek architect and teacher (1937–2026)

Elia Zenghelis (Greek: Ηλίας Ζέγγελης; 1937 – 30 August 2026) was a Greek architect and teacher. He studied architecture at the Architectural Association School of Architecture, London, completing his studies in 1961. From 1961 to 1971 he worked for architects Douglas Stephen and Partners, London, while also (from 1963) teaching at the Architectural Association. Zenghelis became a prominent teacher at the school for introducing more radical avant-gardism into the curriculum. From 1971 to 1975 Zenghelis collaborated with various architects in London, Paris and New York: Georges Candilis, Michael Carapetian, Aristeides Romanos, Rem Koolhaas, O.M. Ungers and Peter Eisenman.

== Metropolitanism ==
Zenghelis came to critical attention for his accomplishments while part of the Dutch architectural firm Office for Metropolitan Architecture (OMA), which he founded in 1975 with Zoe Zenghelis, his wife, his former student Rem Koolhaas, and Madelon Vriesendorp, Koolhaas's wife.

From 1980 to 1987, Zenghelis was partner in charge of OMA London, and of OMA Athens from 1982 to 1987. Out of OMA's projects during that period, Zenghelis was a central influence in earlier works: Extension of the Dutch Houses of Parliament, The Hague, 1978; Lutzowstrasse, IBA Berlin, 1981; Parc de la Villette, Paris, 1982; and Checkpoint Charlie housing, IBA Berlin, 1990.

Several of the paintings that Elia and Zoe Zenghelis collaborated on to illustrate OMA projects—such as Hotel Sphinx (1975) and Sixteen Villas on the Island of Antiparos, Greece (1981)—are now included in the Art and Design collection of the Museum of Modern Art in New York.

== Mediterraneanism ==
Zenghelis' turn to designing bourgeois summer villas in Greece in the early 1980s marked a change in the dynamics of his work: the British architectural journal Architectural Design (no. 51, 1981) noted in regards to his houses in Antiparos, that "Since Elia Zenghelis and Rem Koolhaas formally founded OMA over six years ago, their work, recently described by Bob Maxwell ‘as a series of paradoxes: reductivist yet metaphoric, polemical yet exquisite, modern, yet anti-modern’, has revealed subtle shifts of concern. This idiosyncratic evolution has now moved from Manhattanism to Mediterraneanism; their current project for a series of villas on Antiparos reflects a development of the OMA rationale skilfully crafted with Aegean traditions." This evaluation is somewhat misleading, however, in that after this work Zenghelis still worked in projects in West Berlin, especially the urban infill, part of the IBA Berlin project, in which the city set up a series of invited architectural competitions among avant-gardist architects of the time (including Aldo Rossi, Peter Eisenman and Rob Krier) to design infills on sites throughout the city. OMA designed a structure adjacent to the infamous Checkpoint Charlie site - at a time when the border control was still operating.

== Gigantes Zenghelis Architects ==
In 1987 Zenghelis went into partnership with architect Eleni Gigantes, in the office Gigantes Zenghelis Architects, London and Athens. From 2000 to 2011 they also had a branch office in Brussels, Belgium. However, from 1992 onward, Zenghelis withdrew from active participation in the office, and from design, in favour of his first and true vocation - education, which by then occupied him almost continuously. He continued to lecture on the work of the office however and make occasional contributions.

The office's most prestigious and critically received completed scheme has been the Ashikita House of Youth (1996–1998) in Kumamoto, on the island of Kyūshū, Japan, commissioned by Kumamoto ArtPolis.

== Education ==
In 1989 he was appointed Baukunst Professor at the Kunstakademie in Düsseldorf (stepping into Jim Stirling's recently vacated chair), retiring in 2002. He also taught at the Berlage Institute in the Netherlands (1993–2010), and in 2003 was also appointed a member of its board. From 1997 onward he also taught in Switzerland: as guest professor at EPFL in Lausanne (1997–1998) and ETH in Zurich (1998–2000) and as professor at the Accademia d'Architettura Mendrisio (2000–2007). He was appointed professor emeritus in different schools of architecture, such as the one of University of Thessaly in Greece. In 2012 he taught master classes at The Bartlett and was the Davenport Visiting Professor at the Yale School of Architecture.

== Personal life and death ==
Zenghelis was born in Athens, Greece in 1937. He died on 30 August 2026, at the age of 89.

== Awards ==
- In 2000, Zenghelis received the Annie Spink Award for Excellence in Education from the Royal Institute of British Architects.

== Quote ==
"From the early 60's architecture was entering a period of crisis and the search for a way forward shifting out of the profession and into the schools. (...) Through he Architectural Association I was sent to Ulm and with the support of the school we were able to invite new radical architects like Coop Himmelblau and Adolfo Natalini of Superstudio to London: providing not only cross-pollination but a system of support across borders. By the late 60s the Architectural Association had become a breeding ground for radical ideas and even before I met Rem Koolhaas as a student in 2nd year I had left my job and centred my life at the school." (Zenghelis, "Statement of Intent", 2003)

== Selected list of works by Gigantes Zenghelis Architects ==
- Lanapark Masterplan and residential buildings, Tirana, Albania, 2005.
- Kinostudio, residential building, Tirana, Albania, 2005.
- Extension to Designcenter "De Winkelhaak", Antwerp, Belgium, invited competition (First Prize), 2004.
- Europol Headquarters, The Hague, The Netherlands; Invited Competition, 2004.
- Hellenikon Metropolitan Park and Urban Development, Attika, Greece, competition, 2004.
- Flemish Administration Centre in Leuven, Competition, First Prize, 2002.
- Bolzano ModerneKunstmuseum, competition, Italy, 2001.
- Venice Biennale Pavilion - Invited project for Biennale giardini, Venice, Italy, 2000.
- World Intellectual Property Organization Competition, Geneva, Switzerland, 2nd Stage, Invited, 2000.
- Stuttgart 21 Bibliothek, Stuttgart, Germany, 2nd Stage, 1999.
- Waterfront of Thessaloniki, Invited International Competition, Thessaloniki, Greece, 1997.
- Lleida (Lerida) University Library, Spain - Invited UIA Competition, Finalist, 1997.
- Ashikita House of Youth, Kumamoto, on the island of Kyūshū, Japan, 1996-1998.
- 1995 Moabiter Werder Parliamentary Housing - Invited Competition, 1995.
- Maison de Retraite, Société d'Economie Mixte pour l'Equipement du Loiret, Paris - Invited Competition, 1993.
- Spreeufer-Hauptbahnhof, Berlin - Invited Competition, 1992.

== Sources ==
- Terence Riley (Ed.), The Changing of the Avant-Garde: Visionary Architectural Drawings from the Howard Gilman Collection, New York: The Museum of Modern Art, New York, 2002.
