= S,M,L,XL =

1995 book by Rem Koolhaas and Bruce Mau

- Book cover of S,M,L,XL
- Editor: Jennifer Sigler
- Author: Rem Koolhaas; Bruce Mau
- Language: English
- Subject: Architecture
- Publisher: Monacelli Press
- Publication date: October 31, 1995
- Publication place: United States
- Media type: Print
- Pages: 1376 pp.
- ISBN: 1-885254-01-6
- OCLC: 34225456

S,M,L,XL (ISBN 1-885254-01-6) is a book by Rem Koolhaas and Bruce Mau, edited by Jennifer Sigler, with photography by Hans Werlemann.

== Overview ==
The book was first published by Monacelli Press in 1995 in New York and 010 Publishers in Rotterdam. It is a 1376-page-long collection of essays, diary excerpts, travelogues, photographs, architectural plans, sketches and cartoons produced by the Rotterdam-based Office for Metropolitan Architecture (founded by Koolhaas) in the twenty years prior to publication. The second edition (ISBN 1885254865) was published in 1997, printed and bound in Italy, and has the name Rem Koolhaas printed in orange ink on the cover unlike the original which was printed in yellow. The third, special edition (ISBN 3822877433) was published in December 1998, printed and bound in Italy, and has the name Rem Koolhaas printed in blue ink on the cover. The book weighs 6 pounds (2.7 kg).

== Reception ==
The book became immediately popular, selling all the 30,000 copies of the first edition within months while it was counterfeited in China. The second edition printed in 70,000 copies has been subsequently exhausted as well.

== See also ==
- "Disneyland with the Death Penalty", an article on Singapore critiqued by Koolhaas in the book
