= List of tallest buildings in Rotterdam =

Skyline of Rotterdam Skyline van Rotterdam
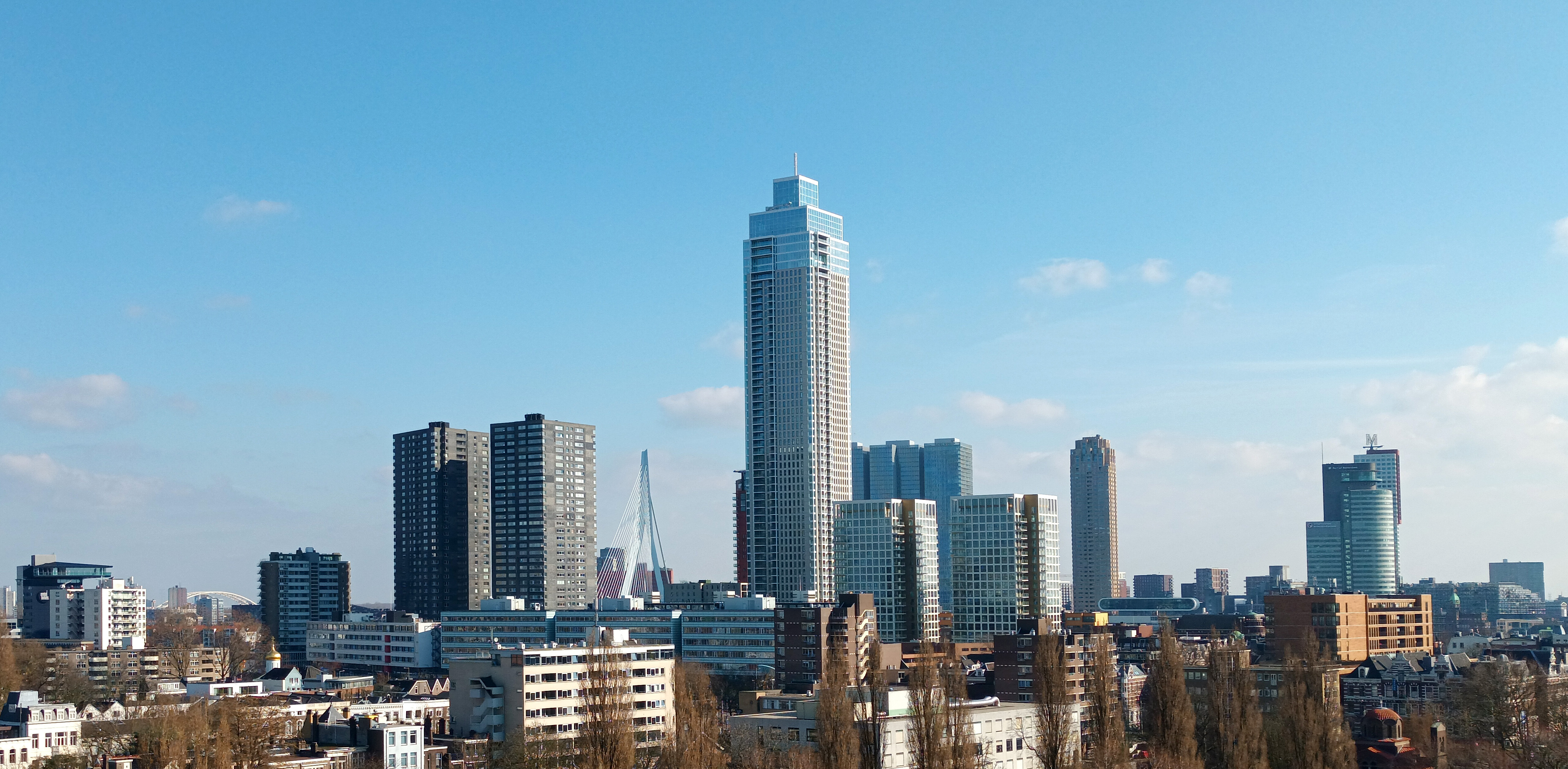
- Rotterdam in 2022 with De Zalmhaven (centre)
- Tallest building: De Zalmhaven (2021)
- Tallest building height: 215 m (706 ft)
- First 150 m+ building: Delftse Poort Tower I (1991)

Number of tall buildings (2026)
- Taller than 50 m (164 ft): 180
- Taller than 100 m (328 ft): 26
- Taller than 150 m (492 ft): 7
- Taller than 200 m (656 ft): 1

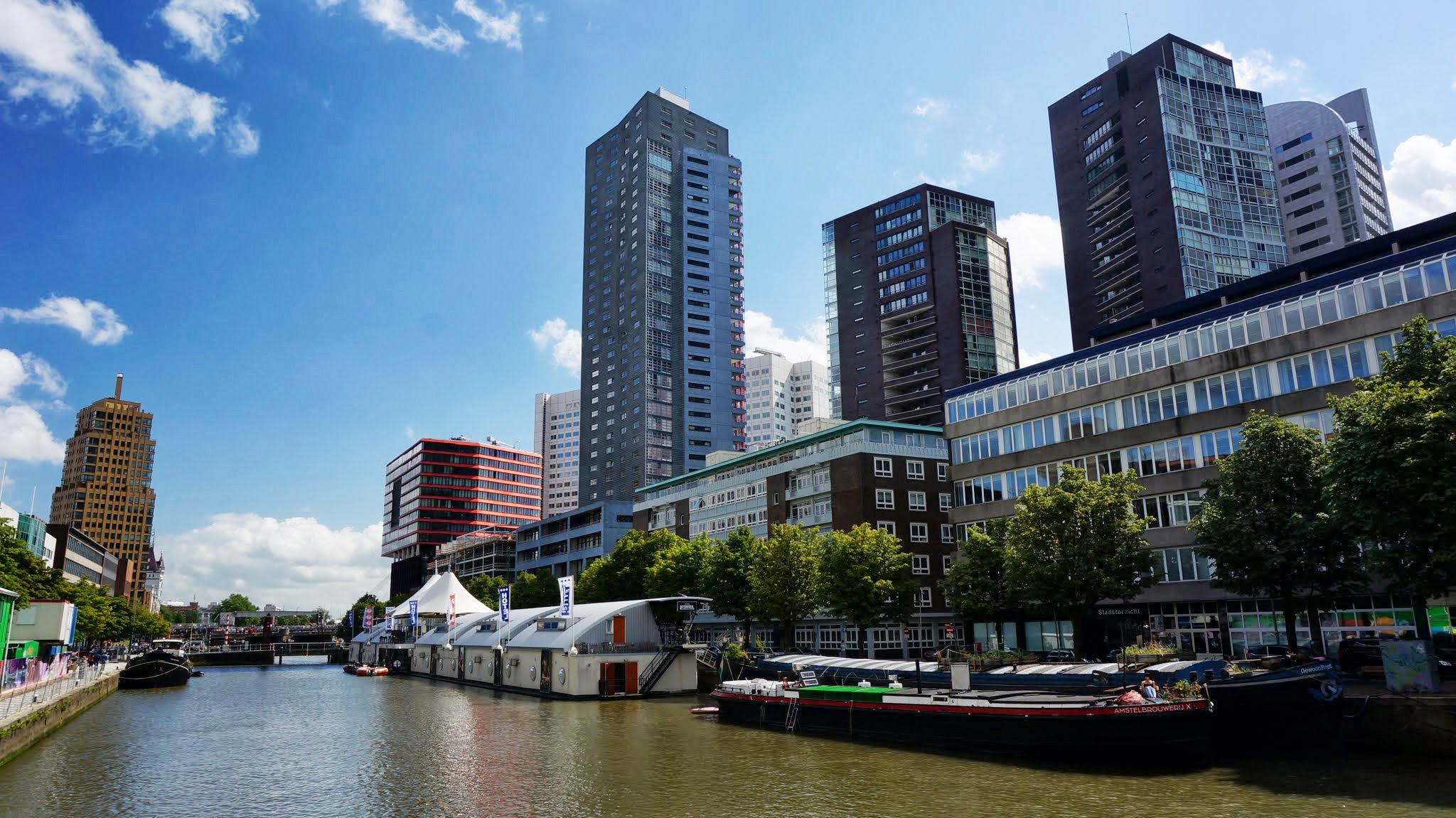
Skyscrapers above a canal in Stadsdriehoek

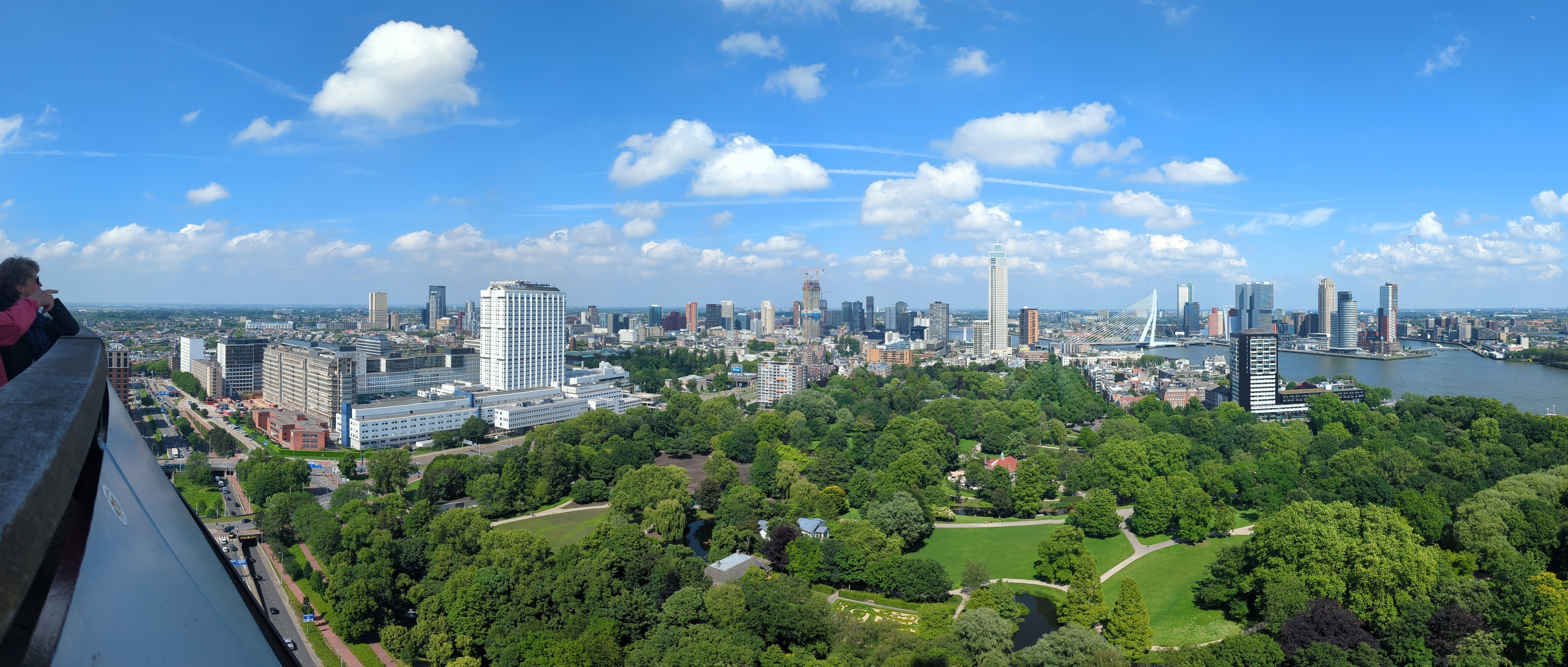
Rotterdam as viewed from the Euromast in 2022

Rotterdam is the second-largest city in the Netherlands. The Rotterdam–The Hague metropolitan area is the most populous in the country, with a population of approximately 2.4 million. Rotterdam is home to many of the tallest skyscrapers in the Netherlands, with over 350 completed high-rises, including 27 buildings with a height greater than 100 metres (328 feet), seven of which are taller than 150 m (492 ft) as of 2026. Rotterdam's skyline is one of the largest in the European Union; it has the largest skyline in the Netherlands and in the Low Countries as a whole. Its tallest building is the 215 m (705 ft), 59-storey Zalmhaven, a residential skyscraper completed in 2021.

Rotterdam's cityscape is famous for its high-rise character. The prevalence of tall buildings has lent it the nickname of "Manhattan on the Meuse", in reference to the island of Manhattan in New York City, and the river, Nieuwe Maas, that runs through the centre of Rotterdam. The history of high-rises in Rotterdam dates back to 1897 with the completion of the "Witte Huis", at the time the tallest skyscraper in Europe. Following heavy aerial bombardment in World War II, Rotterdam had ample space for reconstruction. Rotterdam was rebuilt with modernist ideals, and the city incorporated modern architecture in many new buildings.

While some high-rises were built during the 1960s to 1980s, it was in the 1990s that Rotterdam increasingly embraced skyscraper development, including for residential and mixed-use purposes. In 1991, the Delftse Poort complex was completed next to the Rotterdam Centraal railway station, featuring twin office towers. This trend has continued into the 21st century; the number of buildings above 100 m (328 ft) in Rotterdam almost tripled from nine in 2000 to 26 in 2025. The Rise and Codrico projects, currently under planning, would surpass the height of Zalmhaven if they came into fruition. Together with The Hague and smaller cities, the Rotterdam–The Hague metropolitan area has over 30 skyscrapers taller than 100 m (328 ft), making it one of the metropolitan areas with the most skyscrapers in Europe.

Most of Rotterdam's high-rises are located within or near the city centre, on both sides of the Nieuwe Maas. On the north, skyscrapers can be found in Stadsdriehoek, and surrounding the Rotterdam Centraal train station further north. To the south of the river, the Kop van Zuid neighbourhood is an artificial peninsula, known for distinctive skyscrapers such as De Rotterdam and New Orleans. Within the Nieuwe Maas is the island of Noordereiland, which lacks any tall buildings and maintains its mid-rise identity. Crossing the river is the Erasmus Bridge, whose angular profile rises 139 m (456 ft) above the river, making it a notable feature on the skyline.

== History ==
Number of buildings by height in Rotterdam by the end of each year. Click on the legend to toggle a specific height on or off. View chart definition.

=== Pre-war history ===
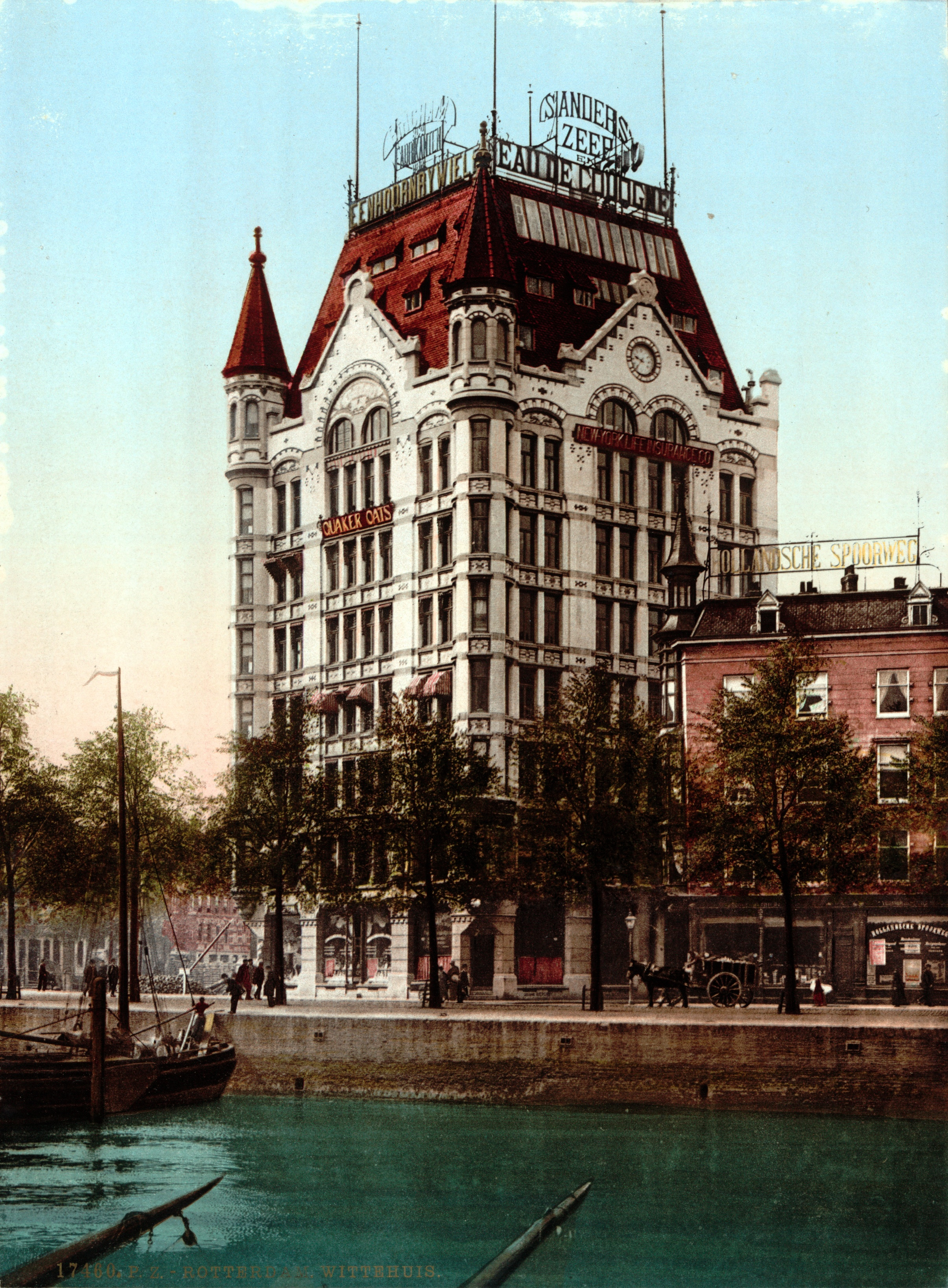
The Witte Huis, Rotterdam's first high-rise

Rotterdam has a longer history with high-rises than most other European cities. The city's skyscraper tradition began in 1897 with the completion of its first high-rise (Hoogbouw in Dutch), the ten-storey Art Nouveau Het Witte Huis (The White House). It was the tallest skyscraper in Europe at the time. The structure features a Chicago-type steel skeleton construction with a ceramic façade. However, the building's 43-metre (141 ft) height failed to surpass the tallest structure in the city, which was the 64-metre (210 ft) Grote Kerk, a protestant church built between 1449 and 1525. The Witte Huis reflected Rotterdam's growth as a major port towards the end of the 19th century, along with a booming population.

High-rise development was slow until the 1930s, with the construction of GEB-gebouw (or GEB-Toren) in 1931. Designed by a group of Dutch architects including Ad van der Steur, it was built as the headquarters of Gemeentelijk Energie Bedrijf (Municipal Energy Company), or GEB for short. It was the tallest building in Rotterdam until the 1960s. During World War II, German occupiers built an anti-aircraft lookout post on top of the building, raising its height by 7 metres (23 ft). Another significant pre-war high-rise was the Ungerpleinflat, completed as part of the Ungerplein complex in 1936. Considered a Bauhaus icon, it was one of the tallest residential towers in Europe at the time. The building's design followed the principles of "Nieuwe Bouwen" (Dutch Functionalism) with "lack of ornamentation, with a focus on pure geometric forms".

The German Army invaded the Netherlands in 1940, meeting unexpected resistance. In May, the historic city centre was heavily bombed, an event sometimes referred to as the Rotterdam Blitz. The extent of the damage led to a decision to demolish most of what remained of the entire city centre. Despite the disaster, the city's destruction was regarded as the perfect opportunity to redress many of the problems of industrial pre-war Rotterdam, such as crowded, impoverished neighborhoods. Rotterdam's reconstruction embraced modernist design principles, such as broad open spaces and low, wide open streets.

=== 1950s–1990s ===
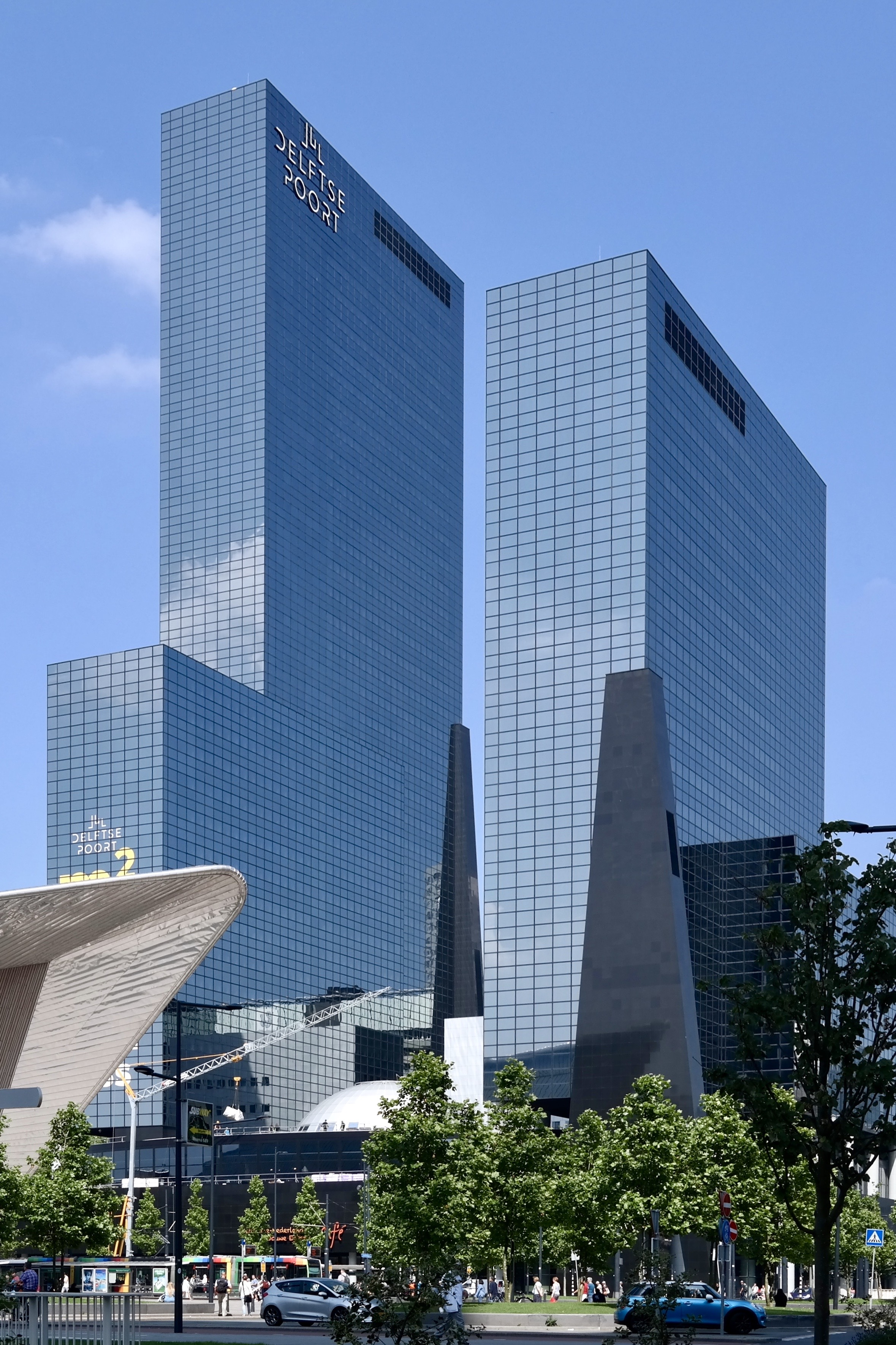
After the completion of Delftse Poort, Rotterdam's skyline departed from simple curtain walls

Despite the turn to modernist architecture, high-rise development was largely absent in the 1950s, gaining steam in the 1960s and 1970s. In 1968, a new high-rise building in the Erasmus University Medical Center, a teaching hospital, was completed. It overtook GEB-gebouw as the city's tallest building and was the first building to surpass 100 m (328 ft) in the city. This precipitated the city's first major wave of high-rise development in the 1970s, with the construction of office towers such as Hofpoort (1976) and the Rotterdam Science Tower (1978), and residential towers including Prinsenwiek (1974) and the Lee Towers complex (1975).

A second, larger wave would begin in the late 1980s, and high-rises would start to reach a height 100 m (328 ft) more frequently. In addition to an increase in architectural height, this wave would show a shift in tall building policy, architectural design, and the functional use of new skyscrapers. In 1993, the Rotterdam Municipal Council launched its first tall buildings policy (Hoogbouwbeleid) in a structured attempt to steer the development of tall buildings in the city. Previous high-rises used mirror-glass facades, with the last major example being the twin-tower Delftse Poort office complex in 1992. Delftse Poort marked a major turning point in the skyline, being the first buildings to exceed 150 m (492 ft) in height. After their completion, building styles became more diverse. Since then, there has also been an increase in the number of skyscrapers designed by international architects, as well as a growth in the function of Rotterdam's tallest buildings, which was increasingly residential

=== 2000s–present ===
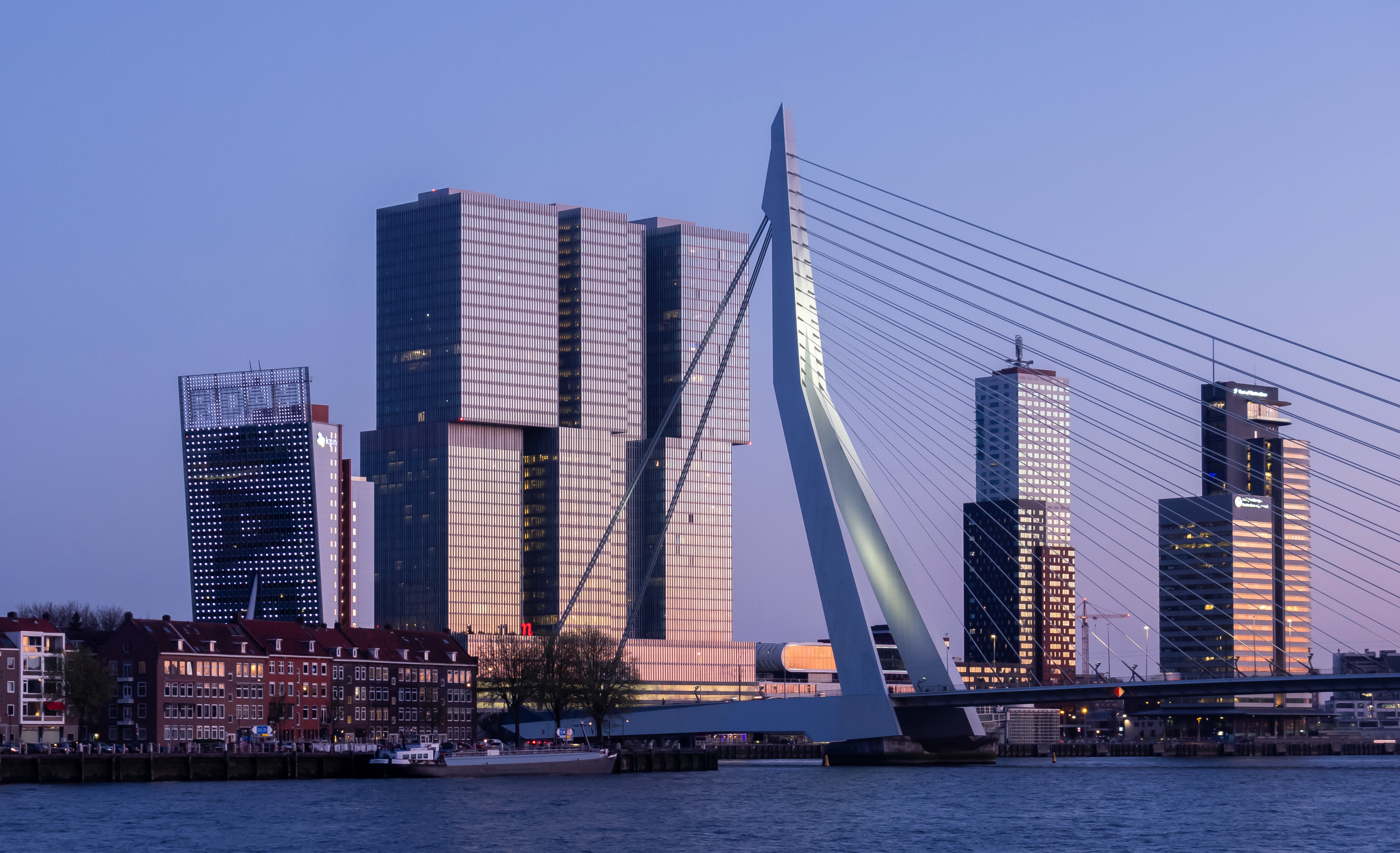
Kop Van Zuid and the Erasmus Bridge

Rotterdam's skyscraper boom continued in the 21st century. A major redevelopment is the Kop van Zuid area, including Wilhelminapier, located on the south bank of the Nieuwe Maas, which had been planned since the late 1980s. Many of the city's tallest buildings came into fruition there, including the World Port Center, designed by Norman Foster, in 2001, and Montevideo in 2005. The latter is designed by the principal of Dutch architectural firm Mecanoo, Francine Houben, making it one of the tallest woman-designed buildings in the world. They would be followed by Maastoren, New Orleans, and lastly De Rotterdam in the early 2010s. De Rotterdam is notable for its design, consisting of stacked, interconnected blocks. Together, the five skyscrapers make up half of the current ten tallest buildings in the Netherlands.

The Maritiem District in Stadsdriehoek, where the Witte Huis was built, was another centre for high-rise construction, with new skyscrapers such as Waterstadtoren (2004), The Red Apple (2009), and UP:Town and 100Hoog in the 2010s. A new eastern high-rise was completed in the Erasmus University Medical Center campus in 2012, as part of a major renovation. The new tower, along with its older companion, form the two tallest buildings in Dijkzigt. In 2021, construction was complete on De Zalmhaven, in Scheepvaartkwartier. It is currently the tallest building in Rotterdam, and the first skyscraper to surpass 200 m (656 ft) in height, being 215 m (705 ft) tall. The mixed-use tower has 256 units across 60 storeys, as well as offices, a restaurant, a roof garden, and a fitness centre. The tower is part of a complex with two shorter high-rises, named the Kaan Towers.

Another significant addition in the 2020s is the Cooltoren (Cool Tower in English), distinguished by a protruding "mid-crown" in the centre of the building. Currently under construction are the Post Tower and the Baan Tower, both skyscrapers over 150 m (492 ft). The latter, with a facade described as "black marble", offers amenities such as a rooftop pool and a spa, and is expected to be complete in 2026. Two projects are planned that could exceed De Zalmhaven in height. The 220 m (722 ft) Codrico, designed by New York City-based SHoP architects, will be located on the site of a former industrial factory. The RISE complex will add 1,500 apartment units with half designated for social or mid-market housing via three towers. The tallest, Hofpleintoren, would be 286 m (938 ft) tall.

== Cityscape ==
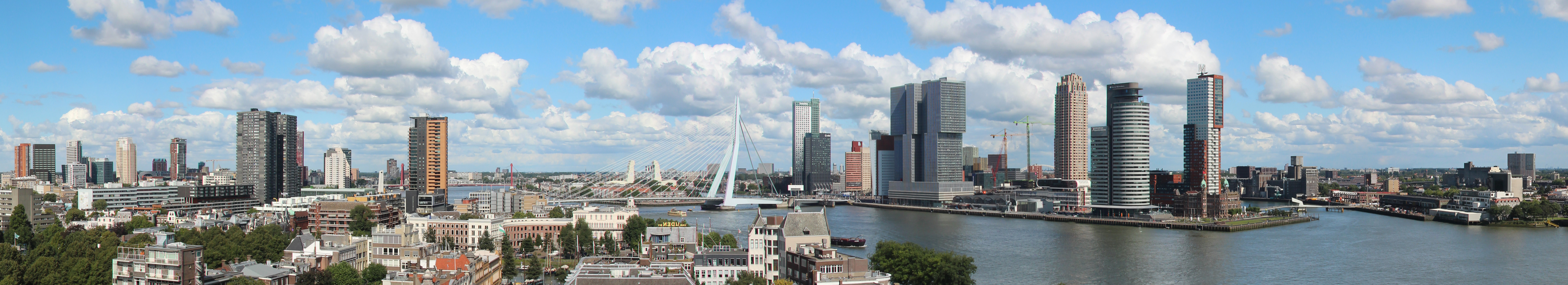
Panorama of Rotterdam in 2016

== Map of tallest buildings ==
This map displays the location of all buildings taller than 100 m (328 ft) in Rotterdam. Each marker is coloured by the decade of the building's completion.

Buildings taller than 100 m (328 ft) in Rotterdam
- 1960s
- 1970s
- 1980s
- 1990s
- 2000s
- 2010s
- 2020s
1 De Zalmhaven
2 Maastoren
3 New Orleans
4 Cooltoren
5 Montevideo
6 Gebouw Delftse Poort
7 De Rotterdam
8 Millennium Tower
9 World Port Center
10 FIRST Rotterdam
11 The Red Apple
12 Nieuwbouw Erasmus MC
13 Erasmus Medisch Centrum
14 CasaNova
15 Waterstadtoren
16 UP:Town
17 Five55
18 Weenatoren
19 100Hoog
20 De Coopvaert
21 Weenacenter
22 The Terraced Tower
23 De Hoge Heren I
24 De Hoge Heren II
25 Schielandtoren
26 Clubhouse Boompjes

== Tallest buildings ==
This list ranks completed skyscrapers and high-rises in Rotterdam that stand at least 100 m (328 ft) tall as of 2026, based on standard height measurement. This includes spires and architectural details but does not include antenna masts. The "Year" column indicates the year of completion. Buildings tied in height are sorted by year of completion with earlier buildings ranked first, and then alphabetically.

Was the tallest building in Rotterdam upon completion

Rank	Name	Image	Location	Height m (ft)	Floors	Year	Purpose	Notes
1	De Zalmhaven		51°54′37″N 4°28′51″E	215 (705)	59	2021	Mixed-use	Tallest building in Rotterdam and the Netherlands. Mixed-use residential and office building. Tallest building completed in Rotterdam in the 2020s.
2	Maastoren		51°54′31″N 4°29′36″E	164.8 (541)	44	2010	Office	Tallest building in Rotterdam and the Netherlands from 2010 to 2022. Tallest office building in Rotterdam. Tallest building completed in Rotterdam in the 2010s.
3	New Orleans		51°54′18″N 4°29′16″E	158.4 (520)	45	2010	Residential	Tallest fully residential building in Rotterdam.
4	Cooltoren		51°54′52″N 4°28′51″E	153.7 (504)	51	2022	Residential	Also known by its Dutch name, CoolToren.
5	Montevideo		51°54′14″N 4°29′08″E	152.3 (500)	43	2005	Residential	Tallest building in Rotterdam and the Netherlands from 2005 to 2010. Tallest building completed in Rotterdam in the 2000s.
6	Gebouw Delftse Poort		51°55′27″N 4°28′20″E	151.4 (497)	41	1991	Office	Tallest building in Rotterdam and the Netherlands from 1991 to 2005. Tallest building completed in Rotterdam in the 1990s.
7	De Rotterdam		51°54′24″N 4°29′18″E	151.3 (496)	45	2013	Mixed-use	Mixed-use office, residential and hotel building.
8	Millennium Tower		51°55′22″N 4°28′17″E	149.0 (488.8)	34	2000	Mixed-use	Mixed-use office and hotel building.
9	World Port Center		51°54′18″N 4°29′05″E	133.6 (438)	38	2001	Office	
10	FIRST Rotterdam	FirstRotterdam	51°55′20″N 4°28′07″E	128.2 (421)	32	2015	Office	
11	The Red Apple		51°55′01″N 4°29′19″E	123.5 (405)	38	2009	Residential	
12	Nieuwbouw Erasmus MC		51°54′41″N 4°28′10″E	119.5 (392)	31	2012	Health	Also known as Erasmus MC Bouwdeel Oost.
13	Erasmus Medisch Centrum		51°54′38″N 4°28′09″E	112 (367)	27	1968	Education	Tallest building in the Netherlands from 1968 to 1991. Also known simply as Erasmus MC. Tallest building completed in Rotterdam in the 1960s.
14	CasaNova		51°55′05″N 4°29′14″E	110 (360)	35	2022	Residential	
15	Waterstadtoren		51°55′02″N 4°29′16″E	108.9 (357)	36	2004	Residential	
16	UP:Town		51°55′00″N 4°29′11″E	107 (351)	33	2019	Residential	
17	Five55		51°55′07″N 4°28′57″E	106.9 (351)	28	1996	Office	Also known as Fortis Bank Blaak.
18	Weenatoren		51°55′28″N 4°28′29″E	106.3 (349)	31	1990	Mixed-use	Mixed-use office and residential building.
19	100Hoog		51°55′04″N 4°29′07″E	106 (348)	32	2013	Residential	
20	De Coopvaert		51°55′04″N 4°29′01″E	105.8 (347)	29	2006	Residential	
21	Weenacenter		51°55′29″N 4°28′26″E	104.2 (342)	32	1990	Residential	
22	The Terraced Tower		51°54′59″N 4°29′22″E	103.8 (341)	32	2021	Residential	
23	De Hoge Heren I		51°54′41″N 4°28′52″E	102 (335)	34	2000	Residential	
24	De Hoge Heren II		51°54′40″N 4°28′50″E	102 (335)	34	2000	Residential	
25	Schielandtoren		51°55′09″N 4°28′53″E	101.4 (333)	32	1996	Residential	
26	Clubhouse Boompjes		51°54′57″N 4°29′19″E	100 (328)	32	2025	Residential	

=== Rotterdam metropolitan area ===
The following table lists buildings in the Rotterdam metropolitan area located outside Rotterdam itself.

Rank	Name	Image	Location	Height m (ft)	Floors	Year	Purpose	Notes
1	De Rokade		Spijkenisse 51°51′10″N 4°20′33″E	113 (371)	33	2010	Residential	Tallest building in the outskirts of Rotterdam.

== Tallest under construction or proposed ==
=== Under construction ===
The following table ranks skyscrapers under construction in Rotterdam that are expected to be at least 100 m (328 ft) tall as of 2026, based on standard height measurement. The "Year" column indicates the expected year of completion. Buildings that are on hold are not included.

Name	Height m (ft)	Floors	Year	Purpose	Notes
De Sax Havana	182 (597)	53	2030	Residential	Second-tallest building in Netherlands upon completion.
BaanTower	159 (522)	51	2026	Residential	
Post Rotterdam	155 (509)	43	2026	Mixed-use	Residential and hotel. Topped out in 2025.
Tree House	130 (427)	37	2029	Residential	
The Modernist 1	123 (404)	38	2028	Mixed-use	Residential and office.
De Sax Philadelphia	107 (351)	31	2030	Residential	

=== Proposed ===
The following table ranks approved and proposed skyscrapers in Rotterdam that are expected to be at least 100 m (328 ft) tall as of 2026, based on standard height measurement. The "Year of construction" column indicates the expected year to begin construction. The "Year of completion" column indicates the expected year of completion. A dash "–" indicates information about the building is not available.

Name	Height m (ft)	Floors	Year of construction	Year of completion	Purpose	Status	Notes
Rise Hofpleintoren	286 (938)	86	2028	–	Residential	Approved	Awaiting ruling on the irrevocability of the license
Codrico Tower	223 (732)	68	2027 Q1	–	Residential	Approved	Construction is scheduled to begin in Q1 2027
Schiekadeblok	200 (656)	–	–	–	Residential	Proposed	In the conceptual stage (the relevant regional plan already exists)
Flow Town 1	185	58	2028/2029	–	Residential	Proposed	The bidding process and basic design have been completed, and construction is scheduled to begin in 2028/2029
Hart 010	185 (607)	–	–	–	Mixed-use	Proposed	Mixed-use office and residential building. In the design stage
Rise Pompenburgtoren	160 (525)	48	2031	–	Residential	Approved	Awaiting ruling on the irrevocability of the license
Lumière	155 (509)	45	2027	2031	Residential	Approved	Awaiting ruling on the irrevocability of the license
Rise Coolsingeltoren	147 (482)	45	2028	–	Residential	Approved	Awaiting ruling on the irrevocability of the license
Toren Pompenburg	140 (459)	39	2028	–	Residential	Proposed	The zoning plan has been approved, and the application for further licenses is still underway
Porter House	130 (427)	34	2027	–	Residential	Proposed	Waiting to submit building permit application
Flow Town 2	130 (427)	41	2028/2029	–	Residential	Proposed	The bidding process and basic design have been completed, and construction is scheduled to begin in 2028/2029
Lima 1	130 (427)	–	2028	2032	Residential	Proposed	In the design stage
Toren Bokelweg 1	125 (410)	35	2028	–	Residential	Proposed	The zoning plan has been approved, and the application for further licenses is still underway
The Oliebron	120 (394)	–	2028	–	Residential	Proposed	In the design stage
Havenhuys 1	113 (371)	34	2027	–	Residential	Approved	Approved, but no further specific information on the construction start date is available yet

== Timeline of tallest buildings ==
Building	Image	Years as tallest	Height m (ft)	Floors
Witte Huis		1897–1931	43 (141)	11
GEB-gebouw		1931–1968	65 (213)	15
Erasmus Medisch Centrum		1968–1991	112 (367)	27
Gebouw Delftse Poort		1991–2005	151.4 (497)	41
Montevideo		2005–2010	152.3 (500)	43
Maastoren		2010–2021	164.8 (541)	44
De Zalmhaven		2021–present	215 (705)	59

== See also ==
- List of tallest buildings in the Netherlands
- List of tallest structures in the Netherlands
- List of tallest buildings in Amsterdam
- List of tallest buildings in Eindhoven
- List of tallest buildings in The Hague
- List of tallest buildings in Utrecht
