= First Tower =

First Tower may refer to:

== Jersey, Channel Islands ==
- First Tower, Jersey, one of the Coastal fortifications of Jersey
- First Tower United F.C., a football team
- First Tower, an area of St Helier, the island's capital

== Other uses ==
- Canal First Tower, a skyscraper in Tokyo, Japan – see List of tallest structures in Tokyo
- Casablanca Finance City Tower, also known as CFC First Tower, an office building in Casablanca, Morocco
- First Tower, the tower portion of FIRST Rotterdam, an office building in Rotterdam, Netherlands
- First Tower, a skyscraper in Calgary, Canada. See List of tallest buildings in Calgary
- Guaita, the first of the three towered peaks overlooking the city of San Marino
- First Tower Trustees Ltd v CDS (Superstores International) Ltd, an English contract law case

== See also ==
- First Bank Tower (disambiguation page)
