= Cooltoren =

Skyscraper in Rotterdam, Netherlands

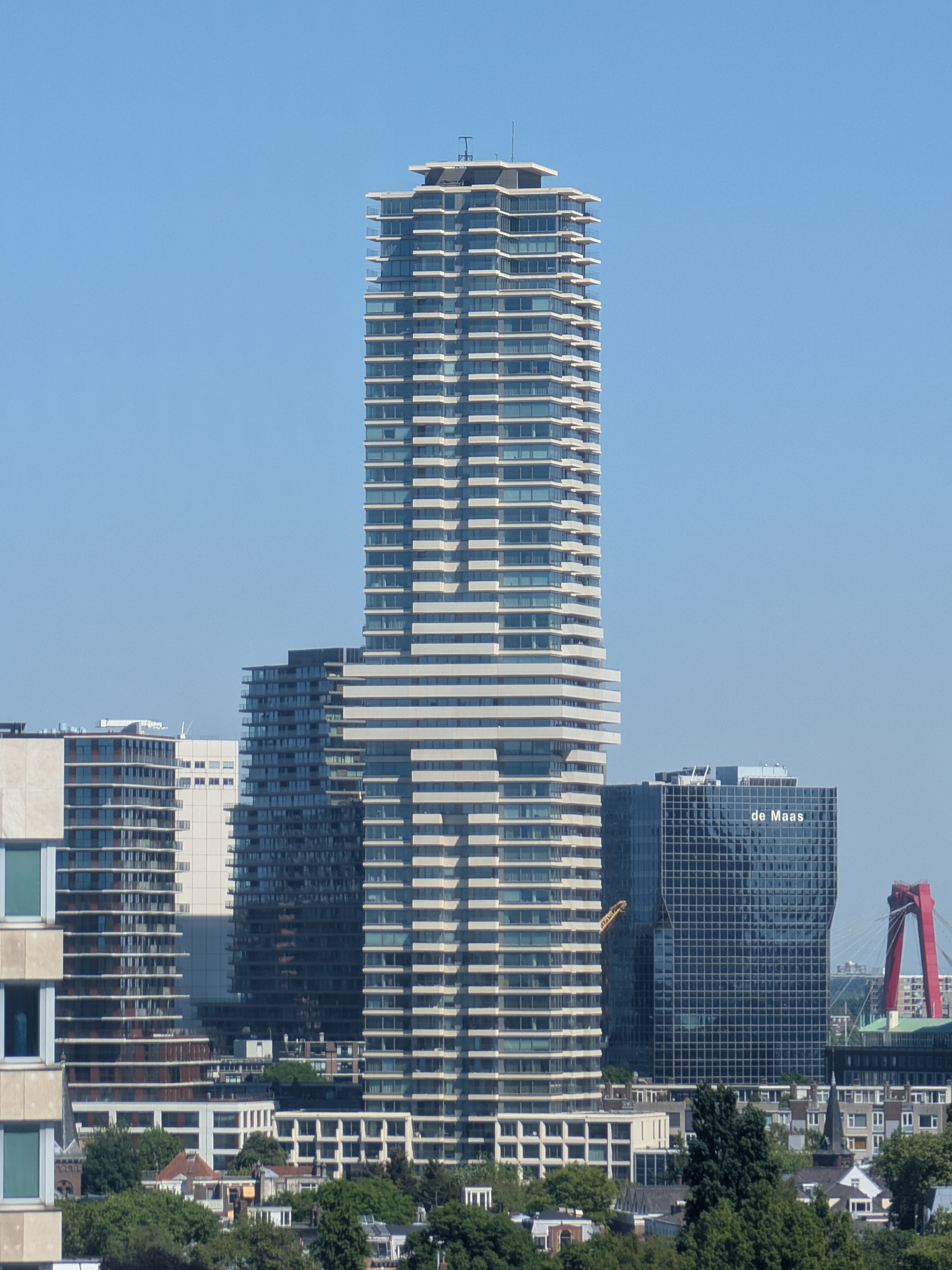
- Interactive map of the Cooltoren area

General information
- Status: Completed
- Type: Residential
- Location: Baan 52, Rotterdam, Netherlands
- Coordinates: 51.91455°N 4.48086°E
- Construction started: 2018
- Completed: 2022

Height
- Roof: 153.7 m (504 ft)

Technical details
- Structural system: Reinforced concrete
- Floor count: 51

Design and construction
- Architect: V8 Architects
- Developer: U Vastgoed
- Structural engineer: Ingenieursgroep Van Rossum
- Main contractor: Ballast Nedam

The Cooltoren (also known as the CoolTower) is a residential skyscraper in the Cool District of Rotterdam, Netherlands. Built between 2018 and 2022, the tower stands at 153.7 m (504 ft) tall with 51 floors and is the 4th tallest building in the Netherlands.

== Architecture ==
The building houses a total of 282 apartment units In addition to the apartments, there is a shared roof garden of 1,770 m² and an above-ground parking garage for cars and bicycles. Sales started in May 2017 and construction began in April 2018. The design by V8 Architects was carried out by the Dutch construction company Ballast Nedam.

Along with the Zalmhaven Tower, the Cooltoren is one of the most prominent and, from the city center, most visible additions to Rotterdam's skyline. The tower has a striking central crown, which devances the height of other residential towers in the proximity of the city center. The largest balconies are located at a height of approximately 70 meters, close to the building's mid-section. From there, residents can view the city from all directions.

The tower was constructed largely of precast concrete elements. A unique color was developed for the exposed concrete. The balconies, parapets, and framing elements were made of aesthetic concrete. The facade is composed of white bands and balconies. Wide-width windows provide daylight and views. The apartments range in size from 50 to 421 square meters. The penthouses are located on the top floors. The four-story central section has four large corner apartments per floor, each with a 72 m² balcony.

== Gallery ==
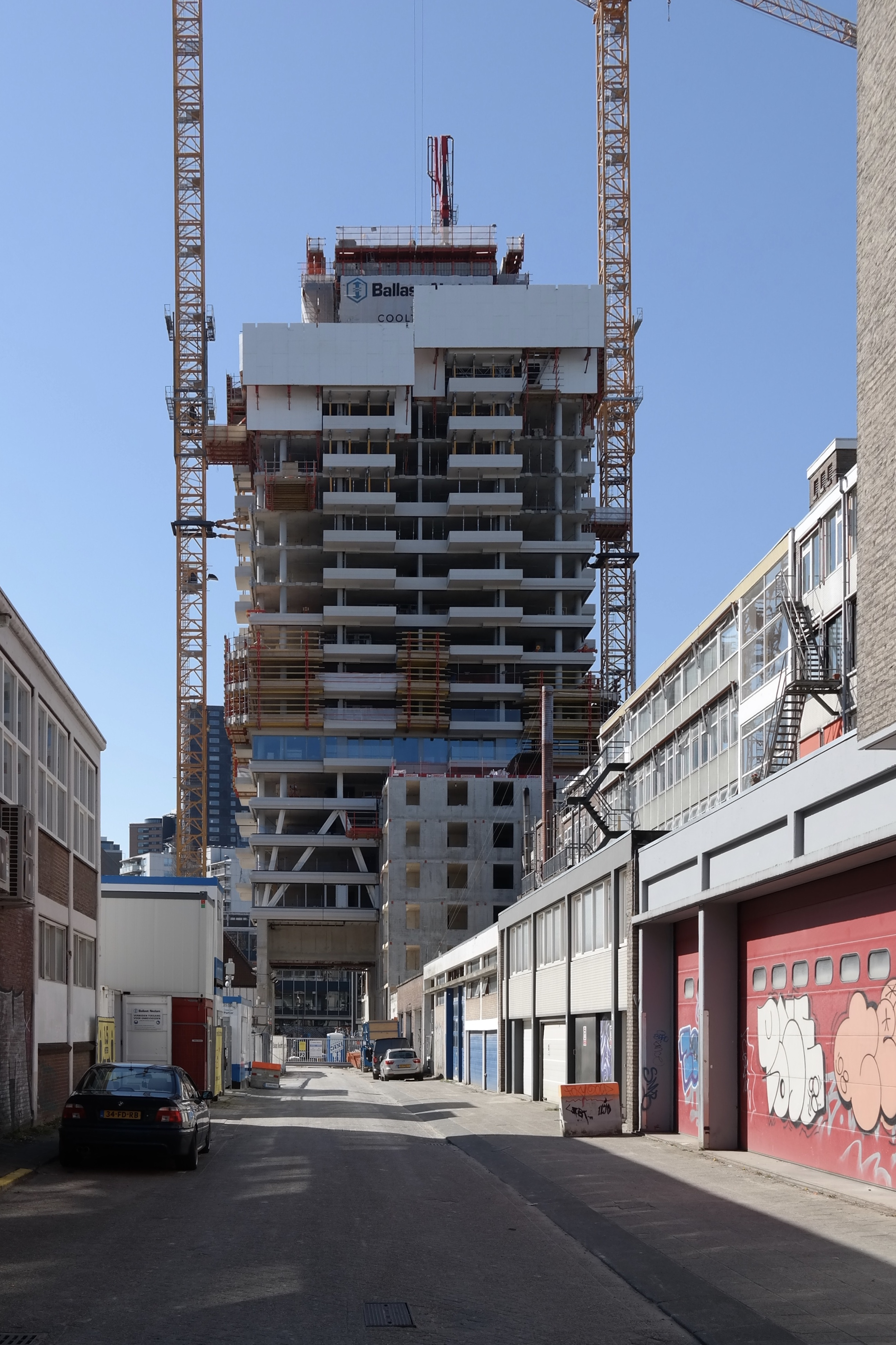
The towe under construction in 2021

== See also ==
- List of tallest buildings in the Netherlands
- List of tallest buildings in Rotterdam
