= De Rokade =

Skyscraper in Spijkenisse, Netherlands

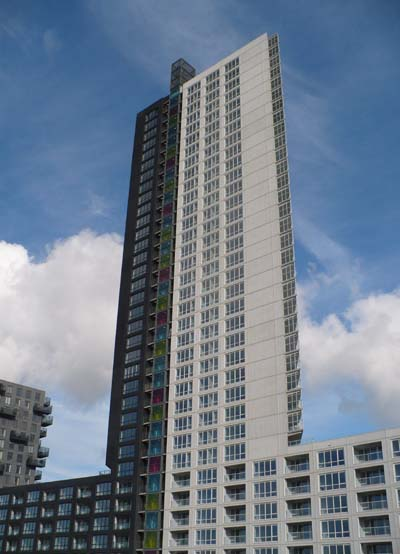
- Interactive map of the De Rokade area

General information
- Status: Completed
- Type: Residential
- Location: Nieuw Hongerlandsedijk 534, Spijkenisse, Netherlands
- Coordinates: 51.85270°N 4.34244°E
- Construction started: 2008
- Completed: 2010

Height
- Roof: 113 m (371 ft)

Technical details
- Structural system: Reinforced concrete
- Floor count: 33 (+1 underground)

Design and construction
- Architect: Rien de Ruiter (Klunder Architecten)
- Main contractor: Ballast Nedam

De Rokade is a residential skyscraper in the Spijkenisse town of the Nissewaard municipality of Rotterdam. Built between 2008 and 2010, the tower stands at 113 m (371 ft) tall with 33 floors and is the 14th tallest building in the Rotterdam metropolitan area.

== History ==
The first pile of the building, which was designed by Rien de Ruiter of the Dutch firm Klunder Architecten, went into the ground on Thursday, 1 April 2008. The first delivery took place in December 2010. The design of the building, with a black and a white side, led to the name De Rokade. Castling is a special move in chess.

== Design ==
Of the 263 apartments in the entire building, the plinth begins on the ground floor with 6 studios (for sale) and commercial spaces (for rent). The first through fifth floors will house 90 rental apartments for people aged 55 and over. The tower will rise above the plinth. Like the plinth, this tower is divided into a black and white section and contains 173 two-, three and four-room apartments also for sale.

The building contains 285 parking spaces. Above these, there will be four event decks, connected by bridges. Their total area is approximately 1,900 square meters. Lodewijk Hoekstra will design these spaces. The ground floor also contains space for shops, restaurants, healthcare facilities, and offices. Like the building next door, De Vier Werelden, De Rokade will use geothermal energy.

=== The Gardens ===
The Party Garden is the first of four event decks. A large chessboard will be placed in the center of the deck, a reference to the complex's name. The garden also offers space for celebrations, such as neighborhood parties or street fairs. The garden also features leafy walkways, plane trees, and benches.

This is the second garden. This garden borders the main entrance and includes a water feature that covers almost the entire area. This water feature will be illuminated at night. Trees in containers will surround the water.

This is the third garden. This garden is entirely planted with a variety of plants. The garden has organic lines and is planted with, among other things, yew and grass, to ensure vegetation even in winter.

This is the fourth and final garden. The deck is completely covered with grass and, using small elevations, depicts the waves created by a droplet in water. There are no benches, lights, or plants on the deck.

== See also ==
- List of tallest buildings in the Netherlands
- List of tallest buildings in Rotterdam
