= CasaNova (Rotterdam) =

Skyscraper in Rotterdam, Netherlands

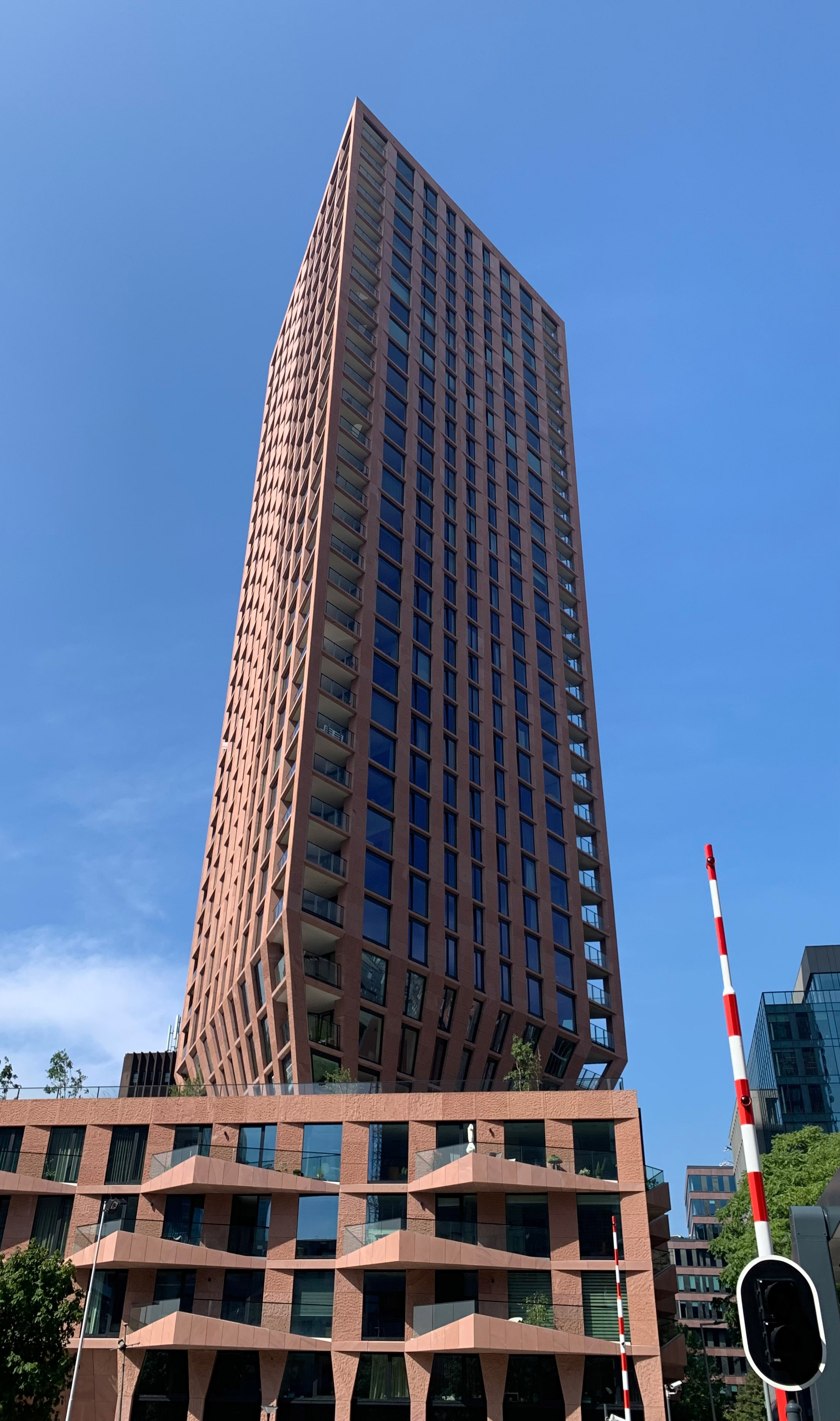
- Interactive map of the CasaNova area

General information
- Status: Completed
- Type: Residential
- Location: Wijnhaven 65, Rotterdam, Netherlands
- Coordinates: 51.91817°N 4.48724°E
- Construction started: 2019
- Completed: 2023

Height
- Roof: 110 m (360 ft)

Technical details
- Structural system: Reinforced concrete
- Floor count: 35
- Floor area: 22,000 m^{2} (237,000 sq ft)

Design and construction
- Architect: Barcode Architects
- Structural engineer: ABT
- Main contractor: Pieters Bouwtechniek

CasaNova is a residential skyscraper in the Maritime District of Rotterdam, Netherlands. Built between 2018 and 2022, the tower stands at 110 m (360 ft) with 35 floors and is the 28th tallest building in the Netherlands.

== History ==
The building was designed by Barcode Architects. Its triangular shape respects the sightlines of the surrounding towers. A unique feature of the building is that the bottom four floors taper downward, resembling a pencil balanced on its point. Casa Nova is connected to the adjacent tower of The Muse.

The tower was built on the Wijnhaven 65 plot and is the first triangular-shaped building in Rotterdam's skyline. The balanced towards the plinth volumetry of the building was adapted to the demands of the urban area. Together with its neighbouring towers, the building shares a 1,600 m^{2} (17,200 sq ft) roof garden above the fifth floor of the linking podium, a four-storey lower substructure housing offices. The garden was designed by landscape architect Jeroen Hamers and laid out by the Koninklijke Ginkel Groep.

== See also ==
- List of tallest buildings in the Netherlands
- List of tallest buildings in Rotterdam
