= First Bank Tower =

First Bank Tower may refer to:

- 225 South Sixth, Minneapolis, formerly known as First Bank Tower
- First Bank and Trust Tower, New Orleans, more commonly known as the LL&E Tower
- First Canadian Place, Toronto, also known as First Bank Tower
