= Witte Huis =

Historical building in Rotterdam, Netherlands

Coordinates: 51°55′07.8″N 04°29′30.3″E

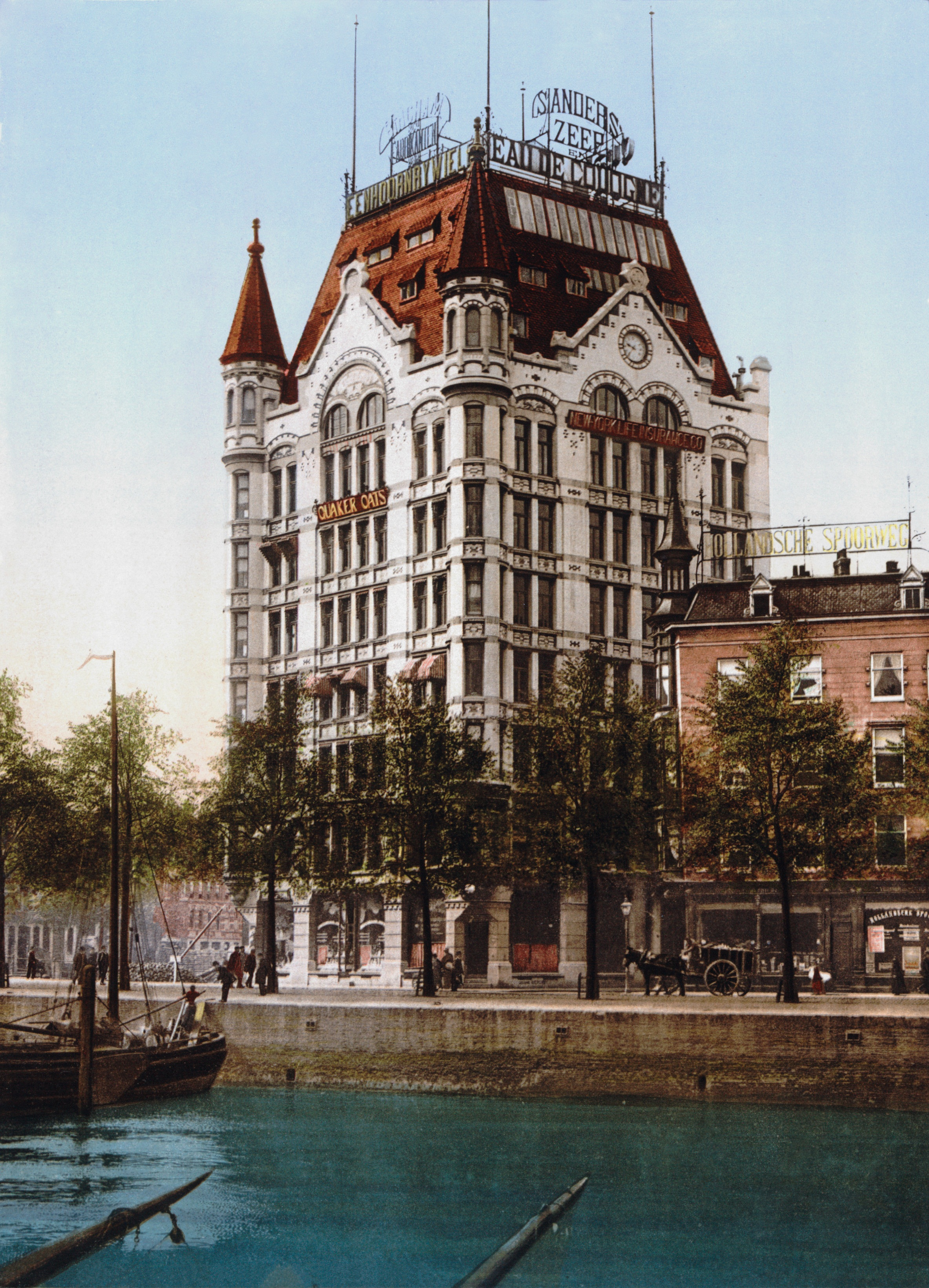
The Witte Huis in 1900

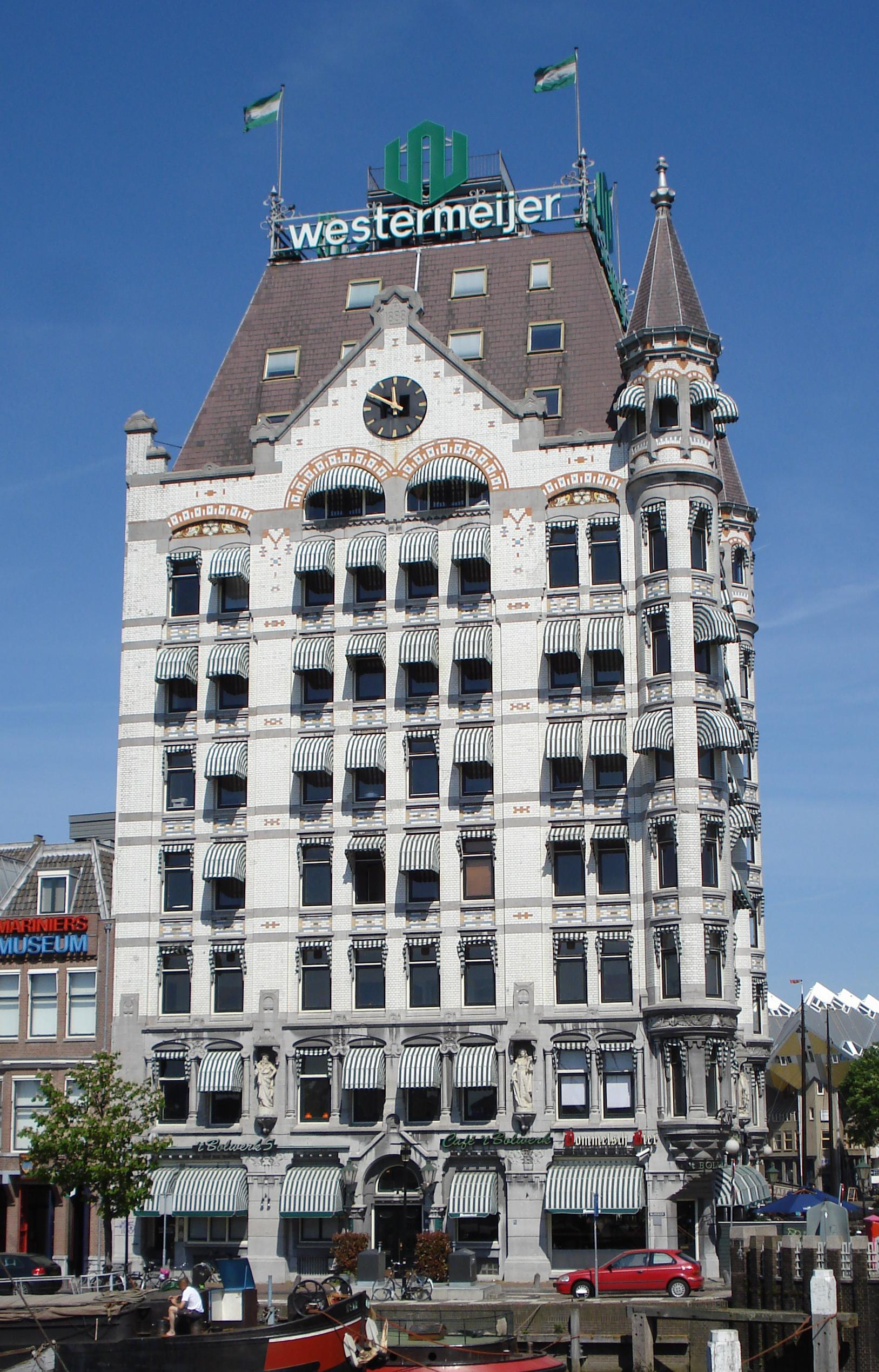
The Witte Huis in 2008

The Witte Huis (Dutch pronunciation: [ˌʋɪtə ˈɦœys]) or White House is a building and National Heritage Site in Rotterdam, Netherlands, built in 1898 in the Art Nouveau style. The building is 43 m (141 ft) tall, with 10 floors. It was the first hoogbouw (literally: high-rise building) in Europe. The building is listed as a Rijksmonument.

== Construction ==
The architect Willem Molenbroek designed the 10-storey building, at the time an unprecedented height in Europe. The site at Wijnhaven 3 is just 1 m above sea-level and skeptics claimed that the soft soil of Rotterdam would be unable to adequately support the building, so before construction could properly begin, 1000 piles were driven into the ground to support the building's weight. The building is constructed from iron, steel and concrete, and includes two thick interior walls which increase the building's strength. Unlike many other contemporary buildings of the time, wood was not a significant construction material due to the fear of fire. The building cost 127,900 Dutch guilders.

It was one of the few buildings in central Rotterdam to survive the German bombing campaigns of World War II.

== In popular culture ==
The White House is featured in the game Battlefield V. It takes place during the Battle of Rotterdam, which itself is part of the Battle of the Netherlands in May 1940. The White House is only featured in one of the two maps called "Rotterdam", which is the one before the Rotterdam Blitz happened.
