= FIRST Rotterdam =

Skyscraper in Rotterdam, Netherlands

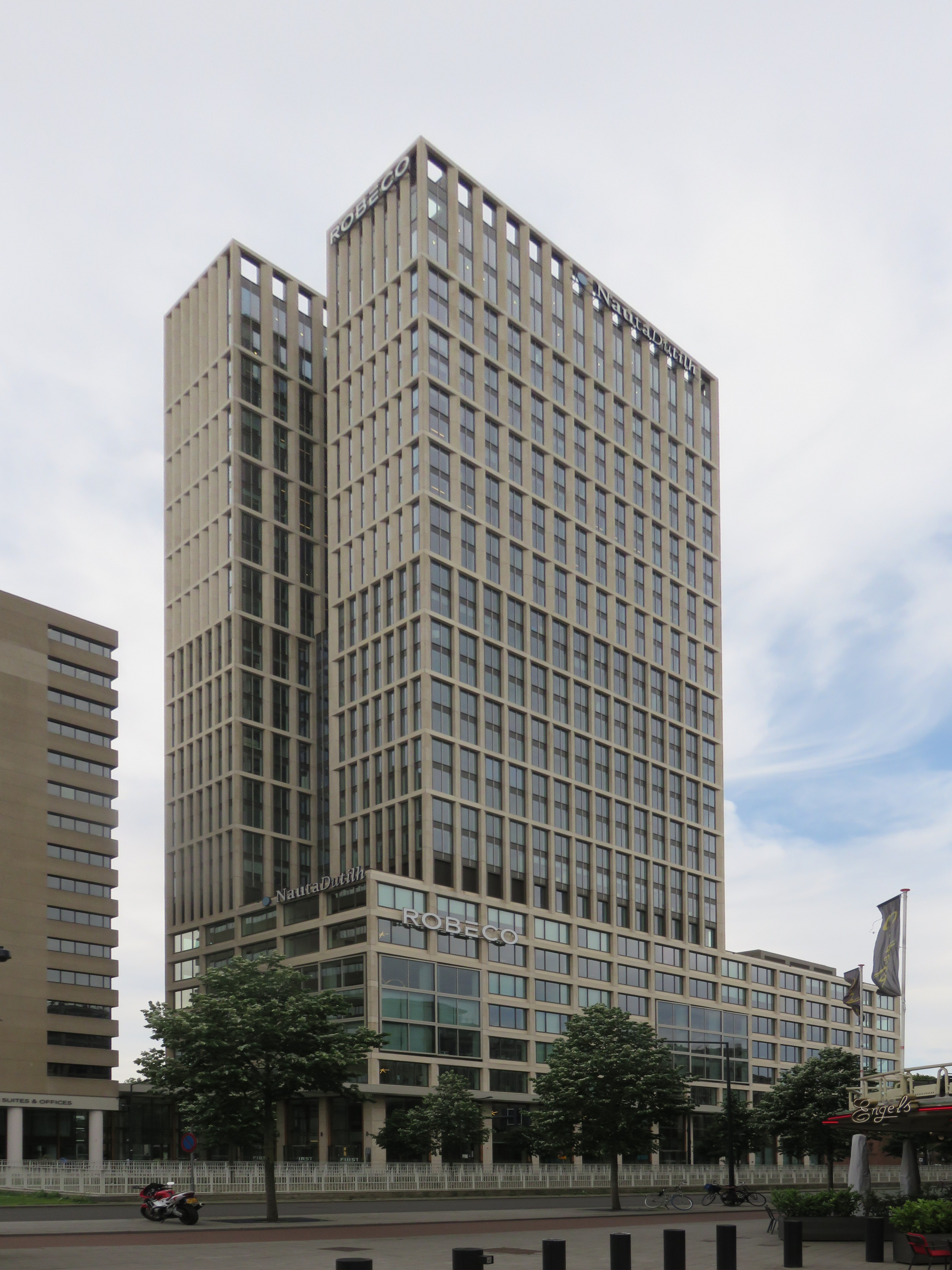

General information
- Status: Completed
- Type: Office
- Location: Weena 750-760, Rotterdam, Netherlands
- Coordinates: 51.922195°N 4.4687°E
- Construction started: 2012
- Completed: 2015
- Cost: €80,000,000

Height
- Roof: 128.2 m (421 ft)

Technical details
- Structural system: Reinforced concrete
- Floor count: 32 (+2 underground)
- Floor area: 47,000 m^{2} (506,000 sq ft)

Design and construction
- Architect: the Architects Cie.
- Developer: Maarsen Groep
- Main contractor: Boele & Van Eesteren; Wessels Zeist

FIRST Rotterdam (also known as the Weenapoint Phase 2) is a high-rise office building in the Weena District of Rotterdam, Netherlands. Built between 2012 and 2015, the tower stands at 128.2 m (421 ft) tall with 32 floors and is the 10th tallest building in the Netherlands.

== Location ==
The tower is located on the Weena in Rotterdam's city centre, opposite the Groothandelsgebouw. The building has 31 above-ground floors and two underground floors. The gross floor area of the office building is 47,000 m^{2} (506,000 sq ft), excluding the parking garage.

== History ==
The complex was developed by FIRST Rotterdam CV, a partnership between Maarsen Groep and MAB Development. In 2009, they engaged the firm de Architekten Cie. Branimir Medić and Pero Puljiz were the project architects. FIRST Rotterdam was the first phase of the redevelopment of the Weenapoint office complex and comprises almost half of the floor area of the redevelopment, which includes apartments as well as offices. Prior to construction, NautaDutilh and Robeco had signed leases, but at the start of construction, no tenant had yet been found for part of the building.

In September 2012, demolition began on the former Bouwcentrum. This three-story office building, dating from 1955 and where Rotterdam's reconstruction was coordinated, had to make way for FIRST Rotterdam. Wall Relief no. 1, a very large brick wall relief by British sculptor Henry Moore that was part of the complex, was temporarily moved to the courtyard of Weenapoint. On January 16, 2015, it became part of FIRST Rotterdam.

Construction began in December 2012 with a ceremony attended by Alderman Hamit Karakus. Construction was carried out by the FIRST construction consortium, consisting of Boele & Van Eesteren and Wessels Zeist. Both companies are owned by Royal Volker Wessels Stevin. A cofferdam was constructed to create the foundation, consisting of sheet piles and strut frames. Work on this began in November 2012. The adjacent monumental domed building had to be taken into account when installing the sheet piles. After the sheet piles were installed, the basement of the former office building was demolished and the parking garage was built there. The foundation was completed in February 2014.

During construction, one new floor was added to the building every three days. On July 8, 2015, FIRST Rotterdam reached its highest point. The building was completed at the end of the same year. Construction was estimated to cost approximately € 80 million.

== Architecture ==
=== Exterior ===
FIRST Rotterdam consists of a plinth building, called FIRST XL, with a height of 35 meters, with the tower, called FIRST Tower, on the eastern part of it. The tower has a shifted H-plan. The building is mainly supported by its core and a load-bearing sandwich facade. The core, the floors and the facade all consist of precast concrete, which allowed construction to proceed relatively quickly. The core and the facade are connected by a two-story wall on the 19th and 20th floors, a so-called outrigger construction.

The core houses, among other things, the elevator shafts and the stairwell. The load-bearing facade is clad with natural stone, composite concrete, and glass. The elongated windows of the facade are recessed between natural stone ribs. The design of the facade was inspired by the Groothandelsgebouw, which is located on the other side of the street. At the very bottom of the facade is the artwork Wall Relief no. 1, which consists of 16,000 clinkers. The two lower floors slope inward on the south side, so that the monumental dome building of the former Bouwcentrum did not have to be demolished. The building rests on over 750 vibro-combination piles with foundation beams on top. These foundation piles are located in sandy soil.

=== Interiors ===
At the base of the skyscraper is the two-story underground parking garage. The garage has 185 parking spaces and a surface area of 7,400 m^{2} (79,700 sq ft). On top of this is the eight-story plinth building. This plinth building is characterized by an atrium, which is the same height as the plinth building, and several large windows with voids behind them. The lower two floors are characterized by large windows and contain lobbies and public spaces, such as a restaurant and an art gallery. A total of 800 m^{2} (8,610 sq ft) of the building is occupied by commercial space, half of which is catering. Also located on the ground floor on the east side of the building is a conservatory, which connects FIRST Rotterdam with the adjacent office building. This conservatory also serves as a windbreak and as an entrance to the complex's courtyard, which has a garden.

The floors in the plinth building have a lettable area of 2,300 m^{2} (24,800 sq ft). The floors in the tower have a lettable area of between 950 and 1,100 m^{2} (11,800 sq ft). The first floors were leased to Robeco (16,000 m^{2} (172,000 sq ft)), which has its head office on the eight lower office floors, and the law firm NautaDutilh (10,000 m^{2} (108,000 sq ft)), which rents the top floors. NautaDutilh already had an office at this location before the new construction. Upon completion in 2016, no tenant had yet been found for floors ten through eighteen, which together have a floor area of 9,000 m^{2} (96,900 sq ft). Rabobank Rotterdam eventually moved into floors 12 through 16 in 2019. The remaining floors were leased in parts to various organizations. The top floors are used as reception areas, meeting rooms, a restaurant, and a bar. The catering facilities have roof terraces.

=== Sustainability ===
FIRST Rotterdam received an "Excellent certificate" from BREEAM-NL for its sustainability. Approximately 200 solar panels are located on the building's roof. An underground thermal energy storage system, built by Eneco, heats and cools the entire building. Heat and cold are drawn from two hot and two cold underground sources, the deepest of which is located 225 meters below ground level. The heat and cold are transferred by a heat pump located in the underground parking garage. In the event of a heating or cooling failure, the office tower is also connected to the city grid, which receives its heat from a waste processing plant. Other factors that earned the building the certification were the use of rainwater for toilet flushing, the green roof, and its accessibility by public transport.

== Gallery ==
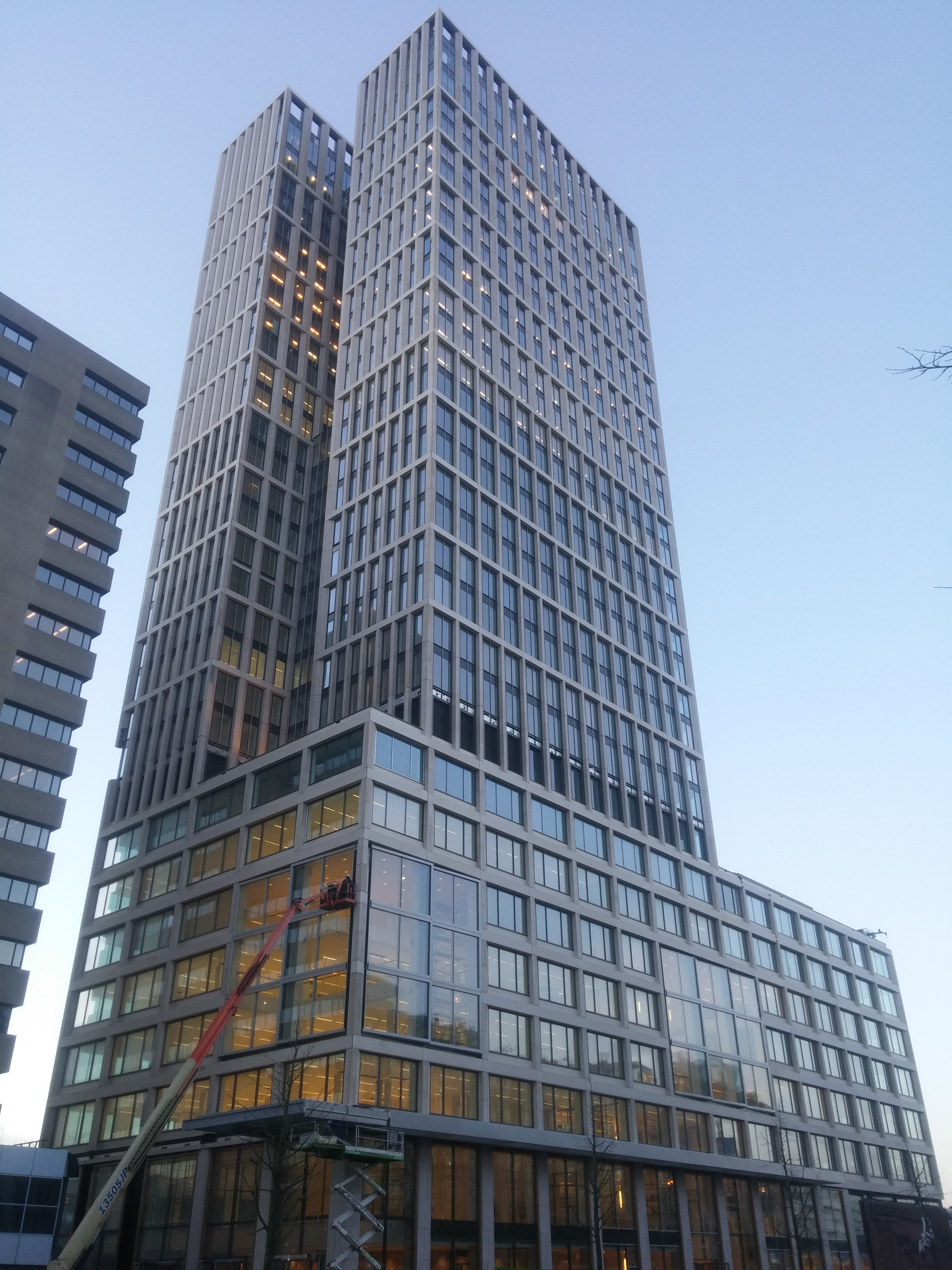
The building shortly after inauguration in December 2015

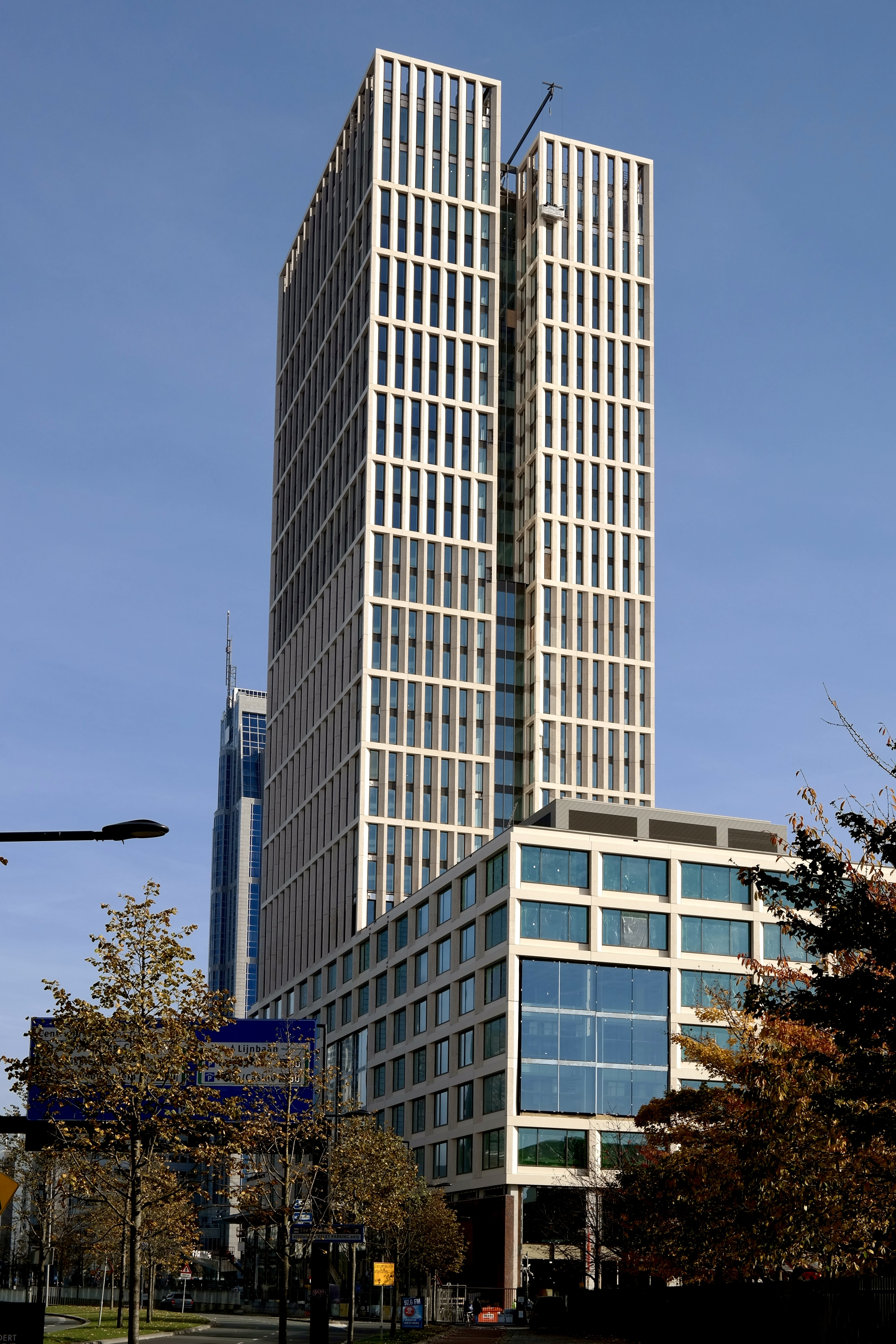
Seen from Weena and the Diergaardesingel

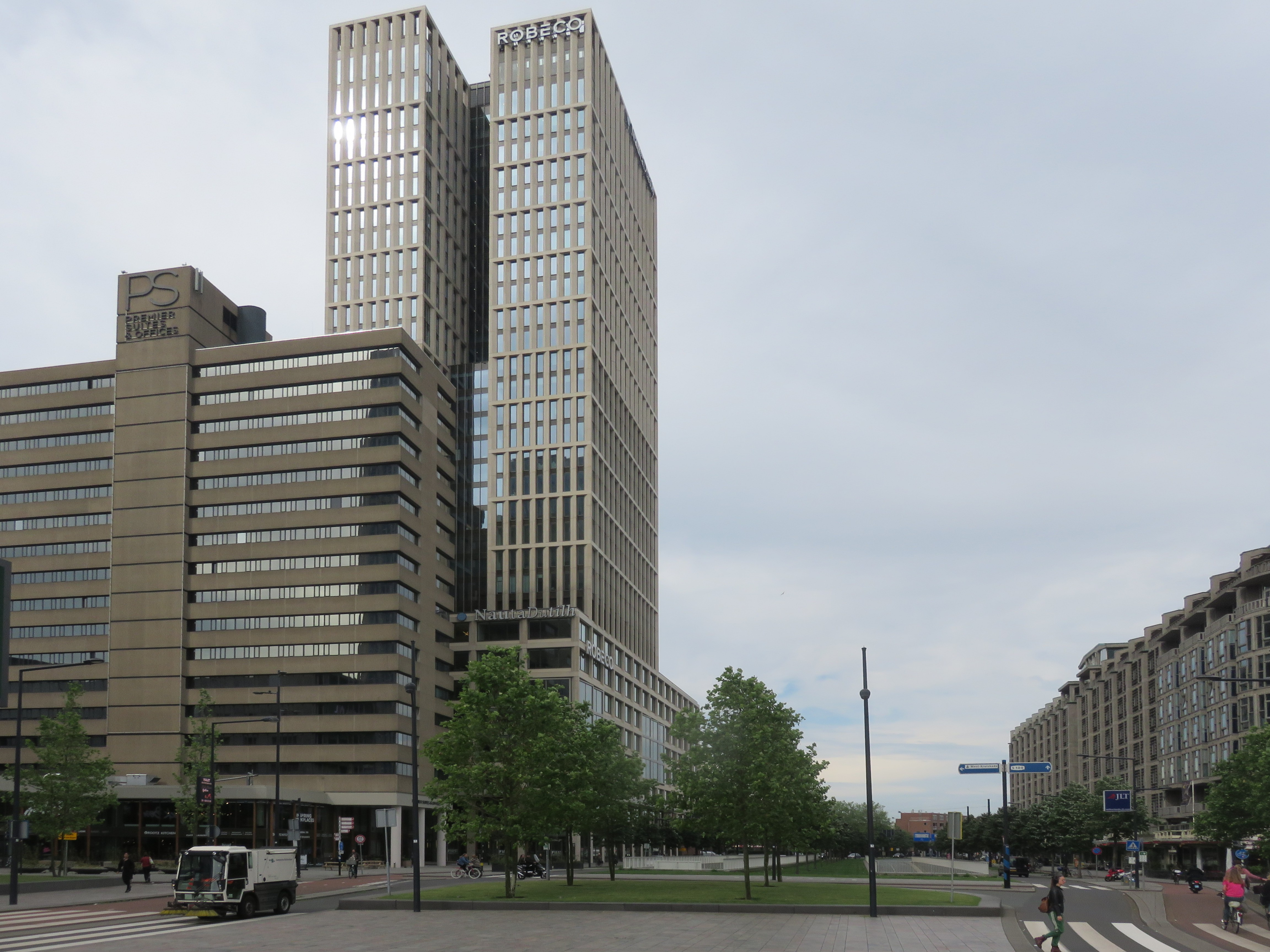
Side seen from the Weena opposite of the Groothandelsgebouw

== See also ==
- List of tallest buildings in the Netherlands
- List of tallest buildings in Rotterdam
