= First Tower Trustees Ltd v CDS (Superstores International) Ltd =

English contract law case concerning the Misrepresentation Act 1967

- Court: Court of Appeal
- Citation: [2018] EWCA Civ 1396

Keywords
- Terms, misrepresentation

First Tower Trustees Ltd v CDS (Superstores International) Ltd [2018] EWCA Civ 1396 is an English contract law case, concerning the Misrepresentation Act 1967.

== Facts ==
CDS Ltd claimed that clause 5.8 of its lease agreement with FTT Ltd was unfair. This said it did not rely on any representation by FTT Ltd. Before the contract, FTT said it was unaware of any environmental problems on the property, yet it was in fact aware of asbestos contamination in the warehouse, and that needed remedial work.

The Judge found the lease was entered based on the landlord's misrepresentation, and clause 5.8 attempted to exclude liability for misrepresentation, but was unreasonable under the Misrepresentation Act 1967 section 3 and the Unfair Contract Terms Act 1977 section 11. Their liability was not limited to the extent of the trust's assets.

== Judgment ==
Lewison LJ held that it was wrong to suggest that a contractual estoppel (where parties are bound to accept something even if they knew it to be untrue) was an answer to a claim under the Misrepresentation Act 1967 section 3, or that a non-reliance clause was immune from scrutiny (disapproving two High Court cases, Thornbridge [2015] EWHC 3430 (QB) and Sears [2016] EWHC 433 (Ch)). MA 1967 section 3 had to be interpreted according to the policy of preventing escape from liability unless it was reasonable. However, when a non-consumer contract simply described a party's primary obligation, this was a ‘basis clause’ and there was no question of applying the reasonableness test. Clause 5.8 was not reasonable. The judge rightly stressed that pre-contract inquiries were important in conveyancing. There could be an exceptional case where a clause precluding reliance on replies could satisfy the reasonableness test, but it would be hard to imagine what that was. The landlord's liability was not limited to the extent of the trust fund. The lease contract stated the landlord only contracted as a trustee, and that limited liability in the contract, but not in tort or damages payable under MA 1967 s 2.

Leggatt LJ and Sir Colin Rimer agreed.

== See also ==
- English contract law
