= World Port Center =

World Port Centre
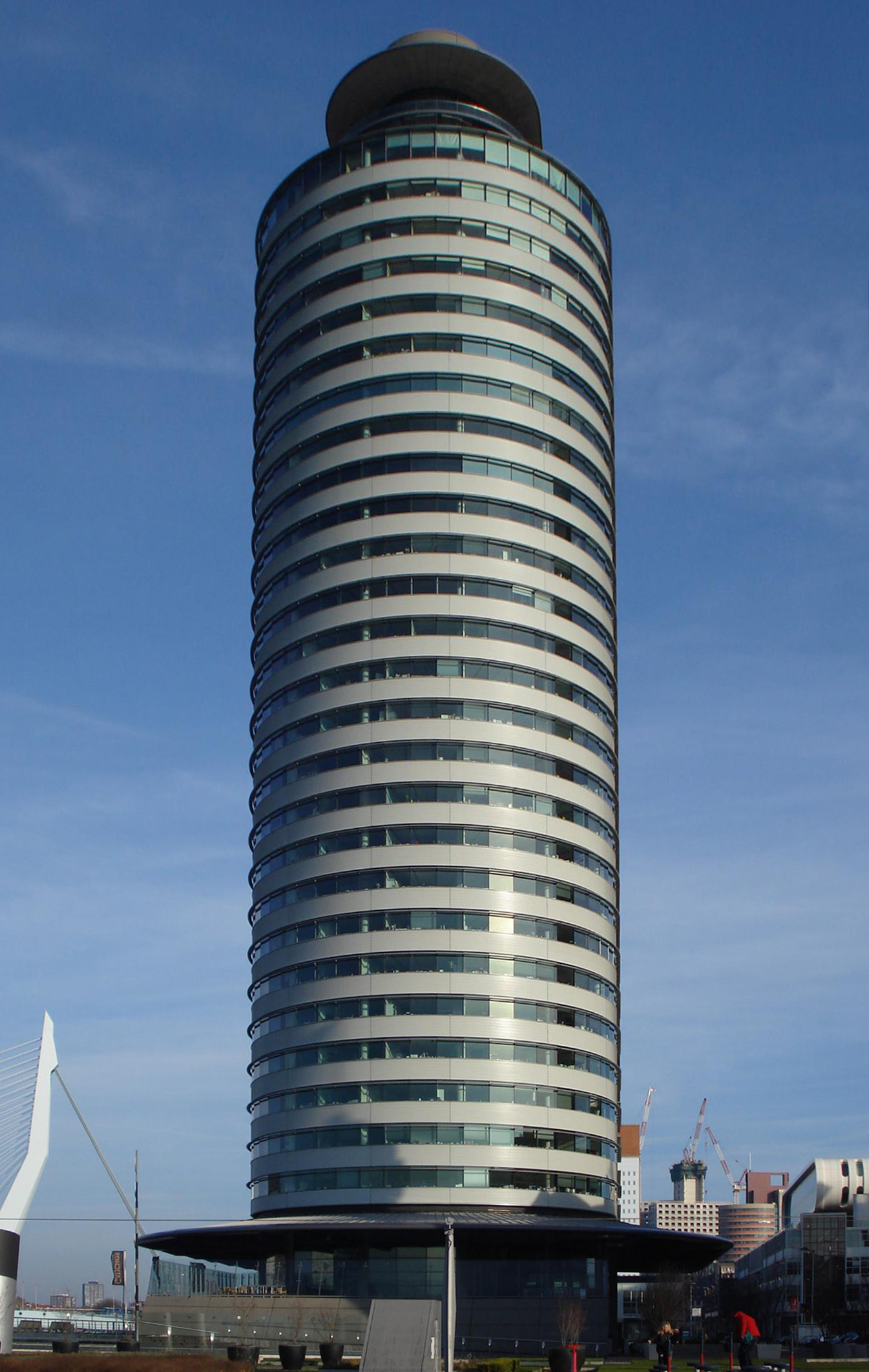
- Interactive map of the World Port Centre area
- Alternative names: WPC

General information
- Status: Completed
- Type: Commercial offices
- Architectural style: Modernism
- Location: Wilhelminakade 901; Rotterdam, Netherlands
- Coordinates: 51.9049°N 4.4848°E
- Completed: 1998 - 2001
- Cost: NLG100 million

Height
- Antenna spire: 138 m (453 ft)
- Roof: 123.1 m (404 ft)

Technical details
- Floor count: 33
- Lifts/elevators: 12

Design and construction
- Architects: Foster + Partners; Bureau Bouwkunde
- Developer: ING Real Estate Development
- Engineer: Aronsohn raadgevende ingenieurs
- Main contractor: HBG Utiliteitsbouw

World Port Centre is a 33-storey, 123.1 m (404 ft) skyscraper in Rotterdam, Netherlands.

== Infrastructure ==
=== Designer ===
Sir Norman Foster designed the 32-storey building. This British architect gained international fame with his designs for the London Stansted Airport, the Hong Kong & Shanghai Bank in Hong Kong, the extension of the Reichstag building in Berlin and the 259 m (850 ft) Commerzbank Tower in Frankfurt. In 1992 he designed the master plan of the entire Wilhelminapier, where the World Port Centre is standing.

=== Builder ===
The tower was commissioned by ING Real Estate Development. The building costs amounted to approximately NLG100 million. The Port of Rotterdam Authority is the main occupant of the WPC, using floors 2 to 19. Floors 25 to 28 are rented to Eneco Energie, floors 29 to 32 are built as conference areas and are commercially leased to Regus. The grounds also cover the Argentine steak-restaurant Gaucho's.

== Features ==
As the building stands at the far point of the Wilhelmina pier it is built on, there is a view of the surrounding harbours and city from the higher floors. The building is also an emergency centre, designed to deal with potential catastrophes in the port area and act as a coordination centre.

== Gallery ==
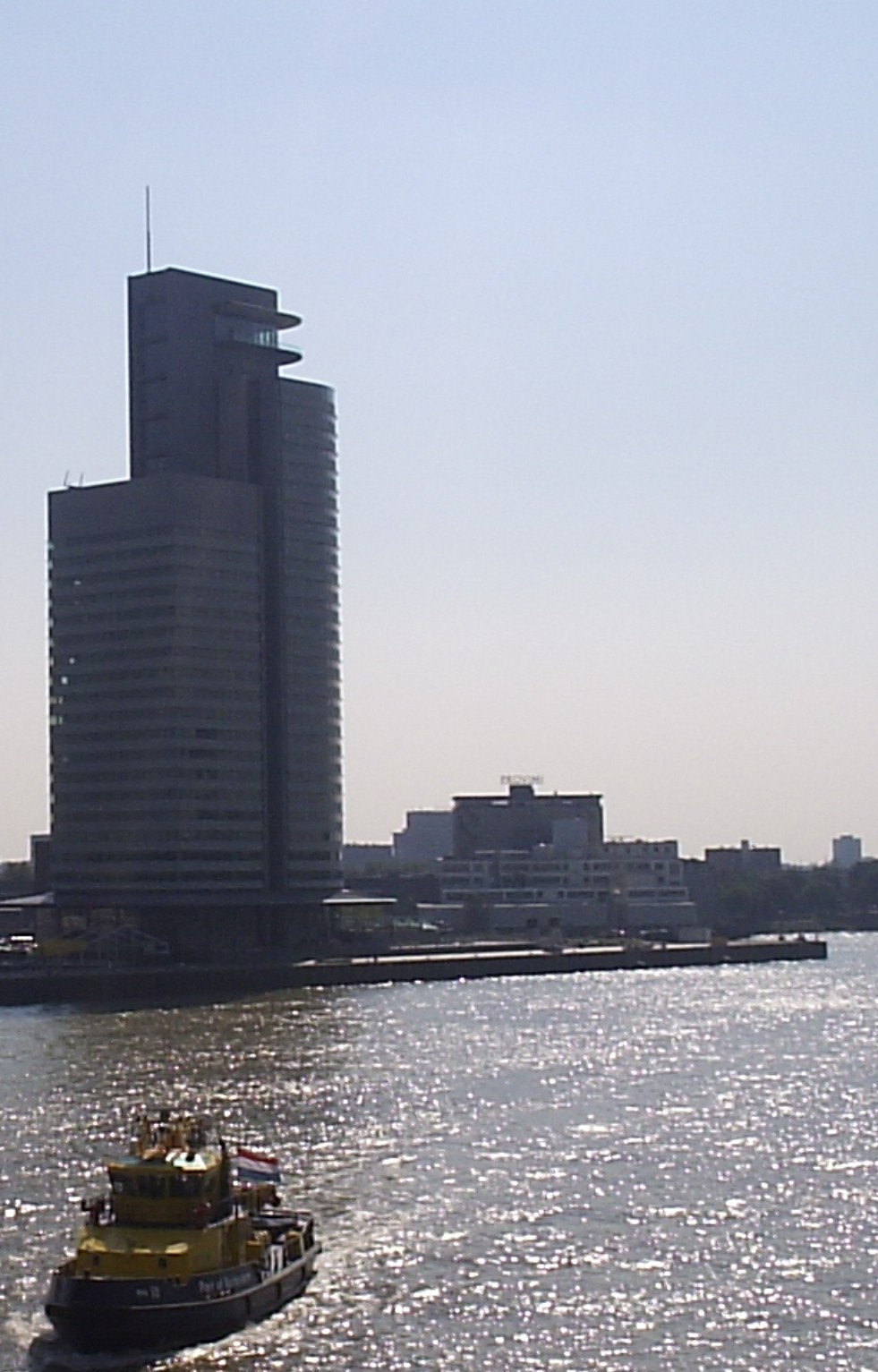
World Port Centre

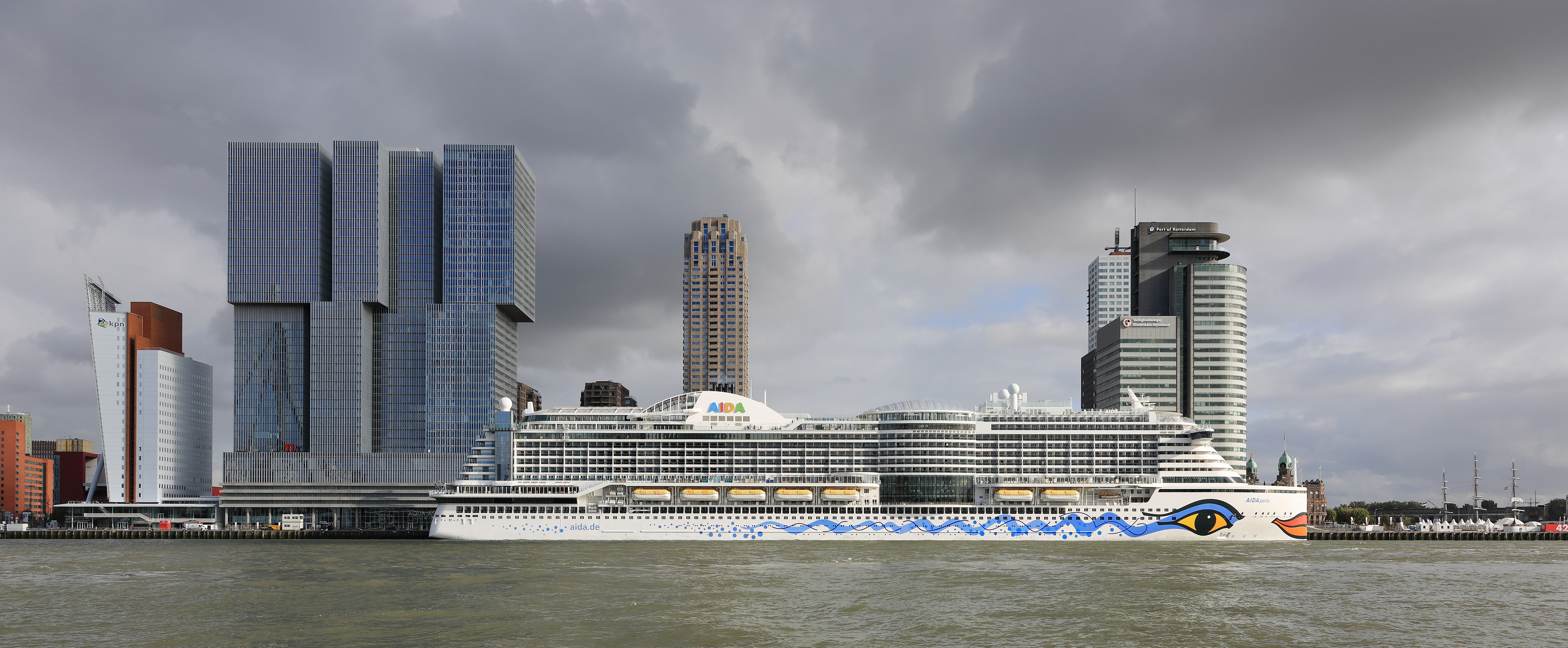
World Port Center with De Rotterdam and cruise ship
