= Schielandtoren =

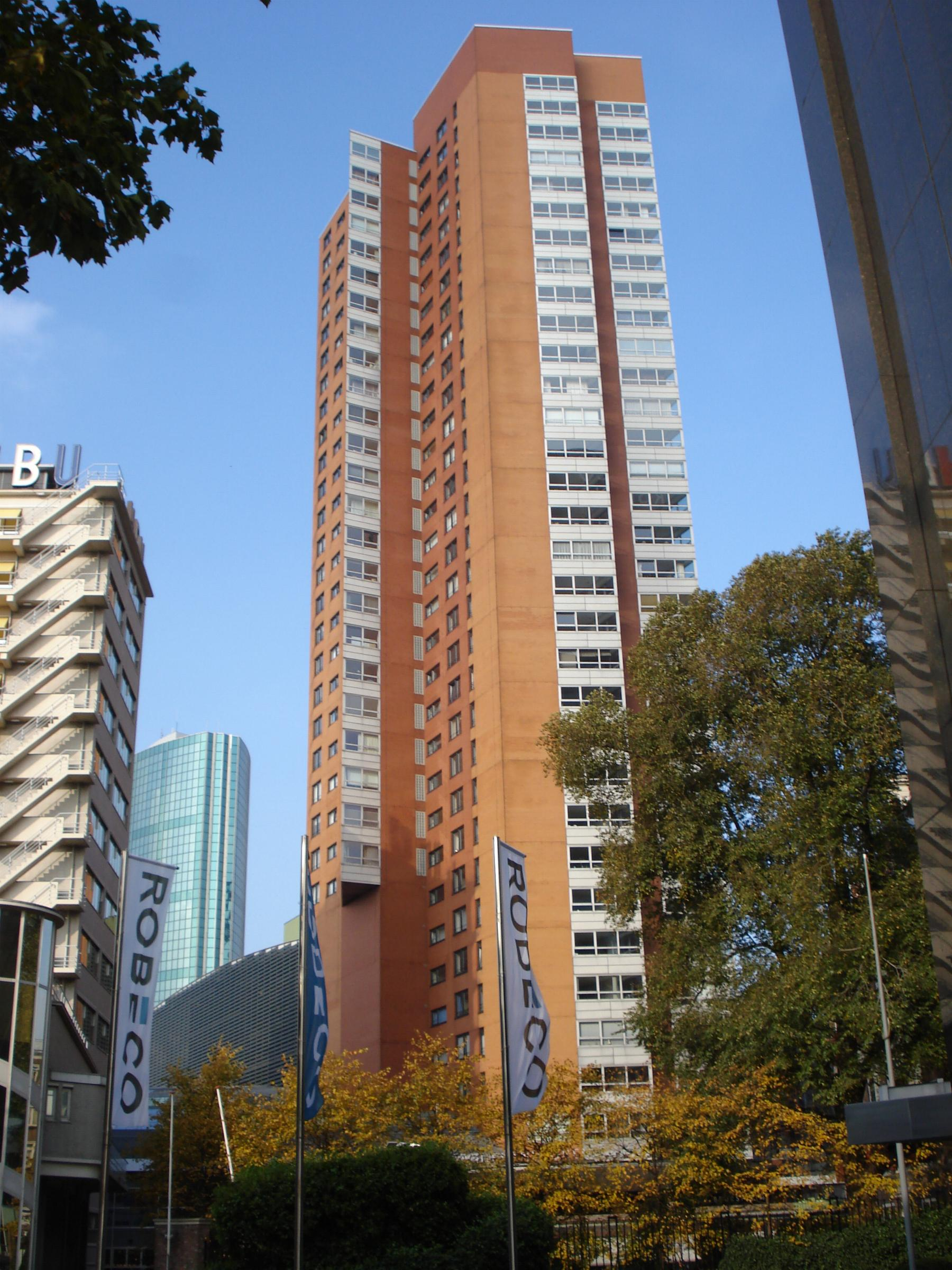
- The Schielandtoren in 2008

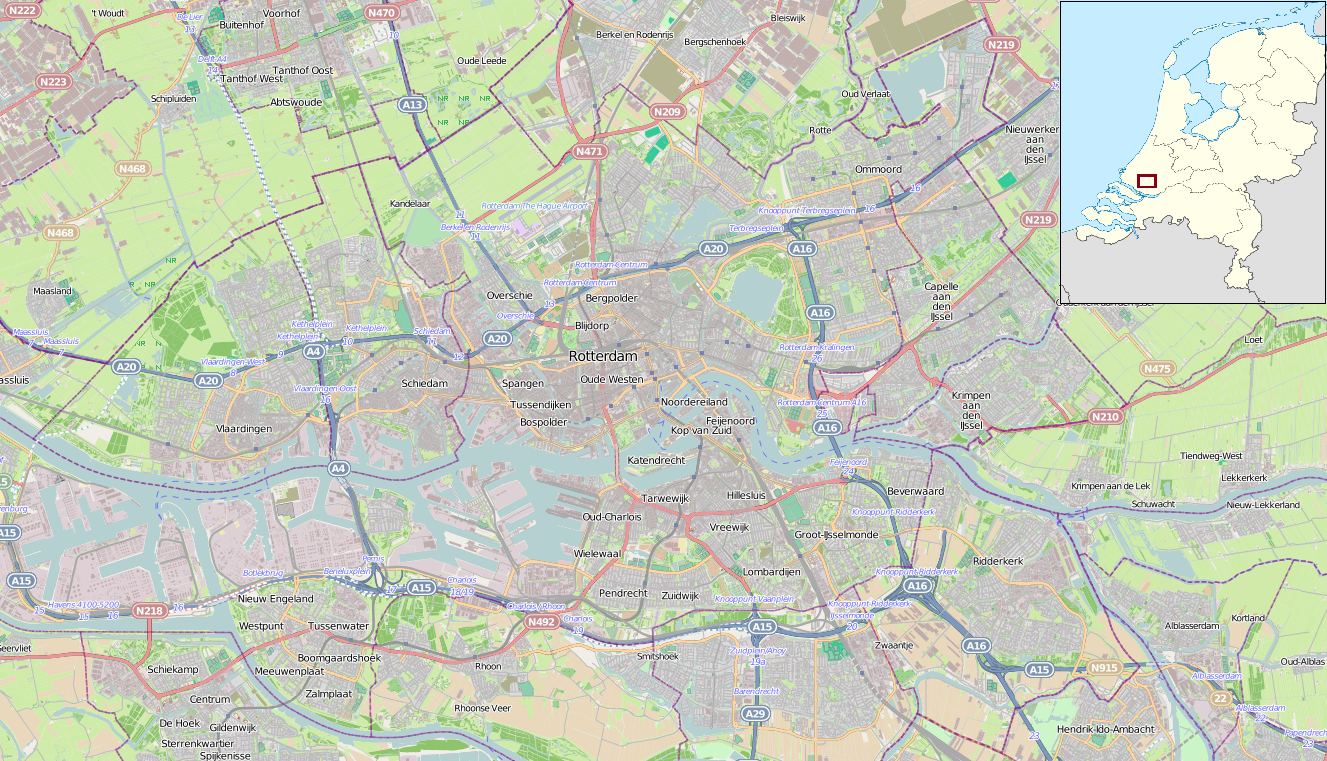
- Location within Rotterdam

General information
- Status: In use
- Type: Residential
- Location: Bulgersteyn, Rotterdam
- Coordinates: 51°55′10″N 4°28′53″E
- Construction started: 1994
- Completed: Late summer of 1996
- Landlord: MVGM

Height
- Height: 101 m (331 ft)

Technical details
- Material: Concrete
- Floor count: 32
- Floor area: 18,300 m^{2} (197,000 sq ft)

Design and construction
- Architecture firm: Pi de Bruijn (De Architekten Cie.)
- Developer: Multi Vastgoed
- Main contractor: Volker Bouwmaatschappij, HBM

The Schielandtoren (Dutch for Schieland Tower) is a 101 metres (331 feet) tall apartment building in the Dutch city Rotterdam. The building is situated along Bulgersteyn, a street, and is part of a city block with shops among other things. The city block is part of the multipurpose complex Beursplein. Het Schielandshuis, a 17th-century building, is located across the street. The building has a total of 32 aboveground floors with 109 apartments. The floor area amounts to 18,300 m^{2} (197,000 sq ft). A parking garage of Q-Park with 435 parking spaces is located in close proximity of the Schielandtoren.

== History ==
Initially, an office building was planned to be built on the location, but eventually it was determined that a residential tower would be built. Multi Vastgoed was the developer of the Schielandtoren. Architect Pi de Bruijn of the company De Architekten Cie. designed the building and also engineering firm Zonneveld was involved in the designing process. The construction started in 1994 with Volker Bouwmaatschappij and HBM as contractors. HBM was responsible for the first floor of the building and the rest of the surrounding city block. The construction of all other floors was carried out by Volker Bouwmaatschappij.

The construction of the Schielandtoren was made more difficult by the small construction site, that had space for a maximum of one crane. Because of the small construction site, tunnel forms were used a lot, since they don't require much work with a crane. Only the elevator shafts and the staircase are composed of prefabricated elements, but there wasn't enough space to store these elements at the construction site. During the construction, building one new floor took a total of three days. The Schielandtoren was completed in the late summer of 1996.

After the building was finished, on 23 November 2010, the Dutch Dienst Nationale Recherche discovered a cocaine workshop in the Schielandtoren, where the drug was cut. Five suspects were arrested and 82 kilograms (181 pounds) of cocaine was confiscated. Professional kickboxer and lawyer Ashwin Balrak was among those five suspects. Several years before, an illegal cannabis nursery was found in the Schielandtoren as well.

== Architecture ==
The Schielandtoren has concrete floors and walls, that support the building. The concrete outside wall is surrounded by a facade, that is made out of red and red-brown bricks, with masonry. This type of facade is unusual for high-rise buildings. In addition, the facade is characterized by metal extensions with a triangular base, that give the building its sharp edges. Those extensions have light window panels on the outside. Because of the numerous angles of the Schielandtoren, it has an irregular ground plan.

The second through the ninth floor are occupied by two apartments each and storage space. From the ninth floor on, each floor contains four apartments. Just over half of the 109 three-room and four-room apartments are rented. The remainder of the apartments have been sold to individuals. The machine room of the elevator and the installation for the window cleaners are located on top of the roof. In the neighborhood of the Schielandtoren, there are several office towers with similar heights. The residential tower distinguishes itself from these towers by its brick facade instead of a glass or metal facade.
