= Millennium Tower (Rotterdam) =

Skyscraper in Rotterdam, Netherlands

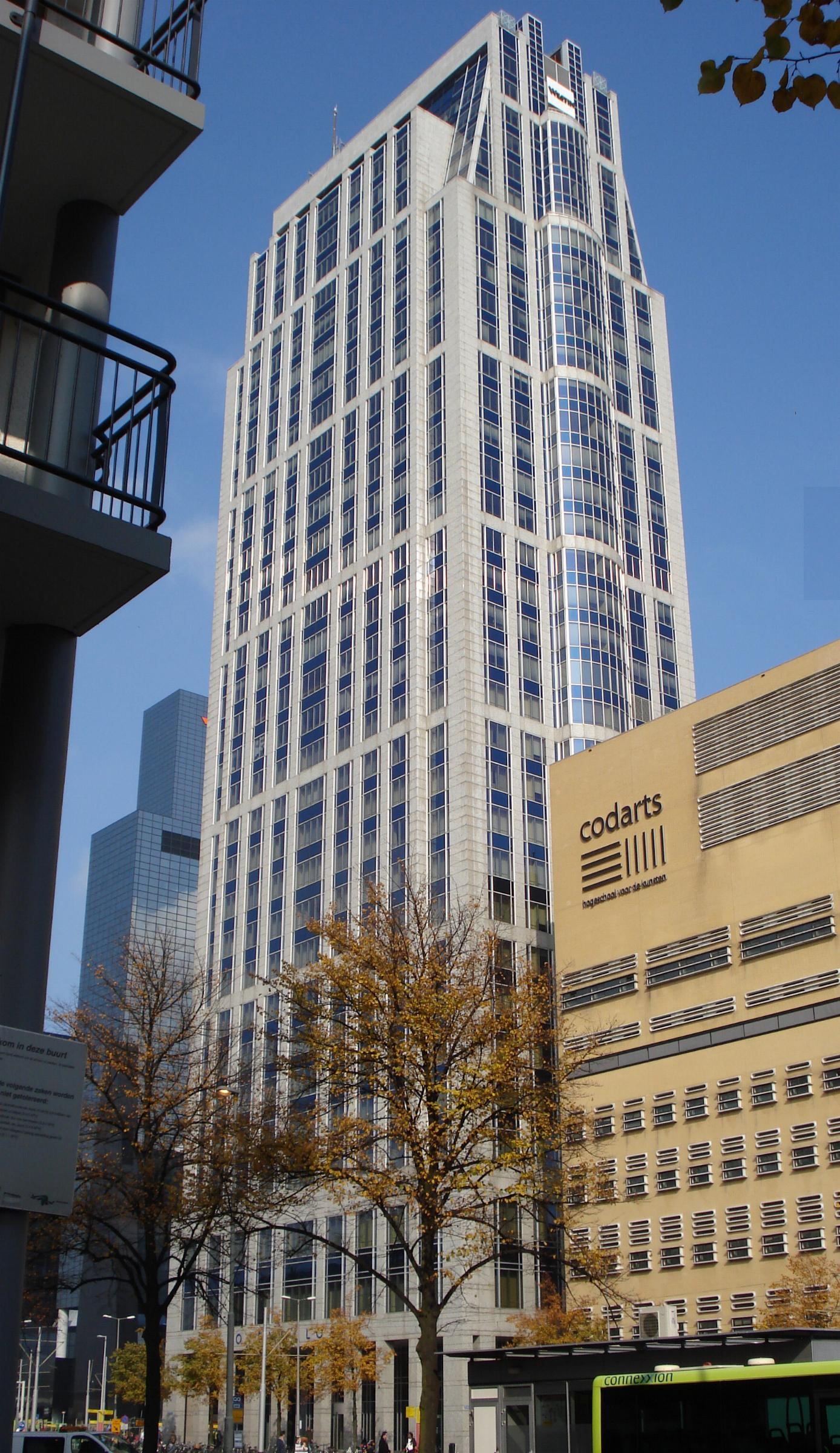
- Interactive map of the Millennium Tower area
- Former names: The Rotterdam Marriott Hotel; The Manhattan Hotel Rotterdam; The Westin Rotterdam

General information
- Status: Completed
- Type: Commercial offices Hotel
- Architectural style: Modernism
- Location: Weena 686-696; Rotterdam, Netherlands
- Coordinates: 51.9225°N 4.4715°E
- Completed: 1997 - 2000

Height
- Antenna spire: 149 m (489 ft)
- Roof: 130.8 m (429 ft)

Technical details
- Floor count: 34; 2 below ground
- Floor area: 38,000 m^{2} (410,000 sq ft)
- Lifts/elevators: 12

Design and construction
- Architects: WZMH Architects; AGS Architecten
- Structural engineer: D3BN; Deerns Raadgevende Ingenieurs
- Main contractor: Bouwcombinatie Weena toren BAM Bredero; Ballast Nedam IGB

Other information
- Number of rooms: 228

Millennium Tower is a 34-story, 149 m (489 ft) skyscraper in Rotterdam, Netherlands design by WZMH Architects and AGS Architecten. It was completed in 2000. The tower was built on Weena in front of the Central station. It is mixed use, the first 15 floors belong to the Rotterdam Marriott Hotel, including 2 restaurant, the other floor are being used as offices.

== Construction ==
The tower was originally designed to be built with hollow-core slabs, but close to building start the design was changed to incorporate the BubbleDeck system. This was the first time this new method was in use in the Netherlands, and also the first major project worldwide to incorporate this technique.

In spite of the late design change, the project was finished before time, due to a reduction in the erection cycles from 10 to 4 days per level, and a reduction in crane lift by app 50 percent.

When finished, Millennium Tower was the second tallest building in the Netherlands.

== Construction features ==
- Faster building time
- Less flooring height due beamless structure resulting in two extra levels within original building height
- The green credentials: Reduced the number of truckloads into central Rotterdam by 500
Millennium Tower construction
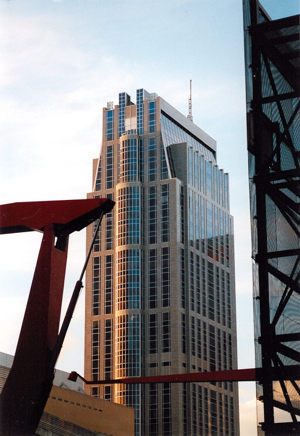

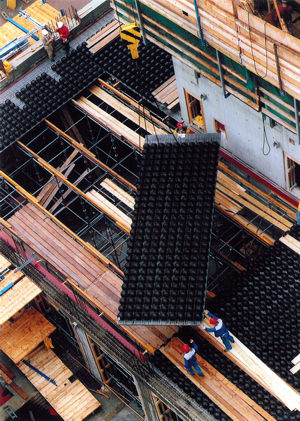
