= Delftse Poort =

Twin-tower skyscraper in Rotterdam, Netherlands

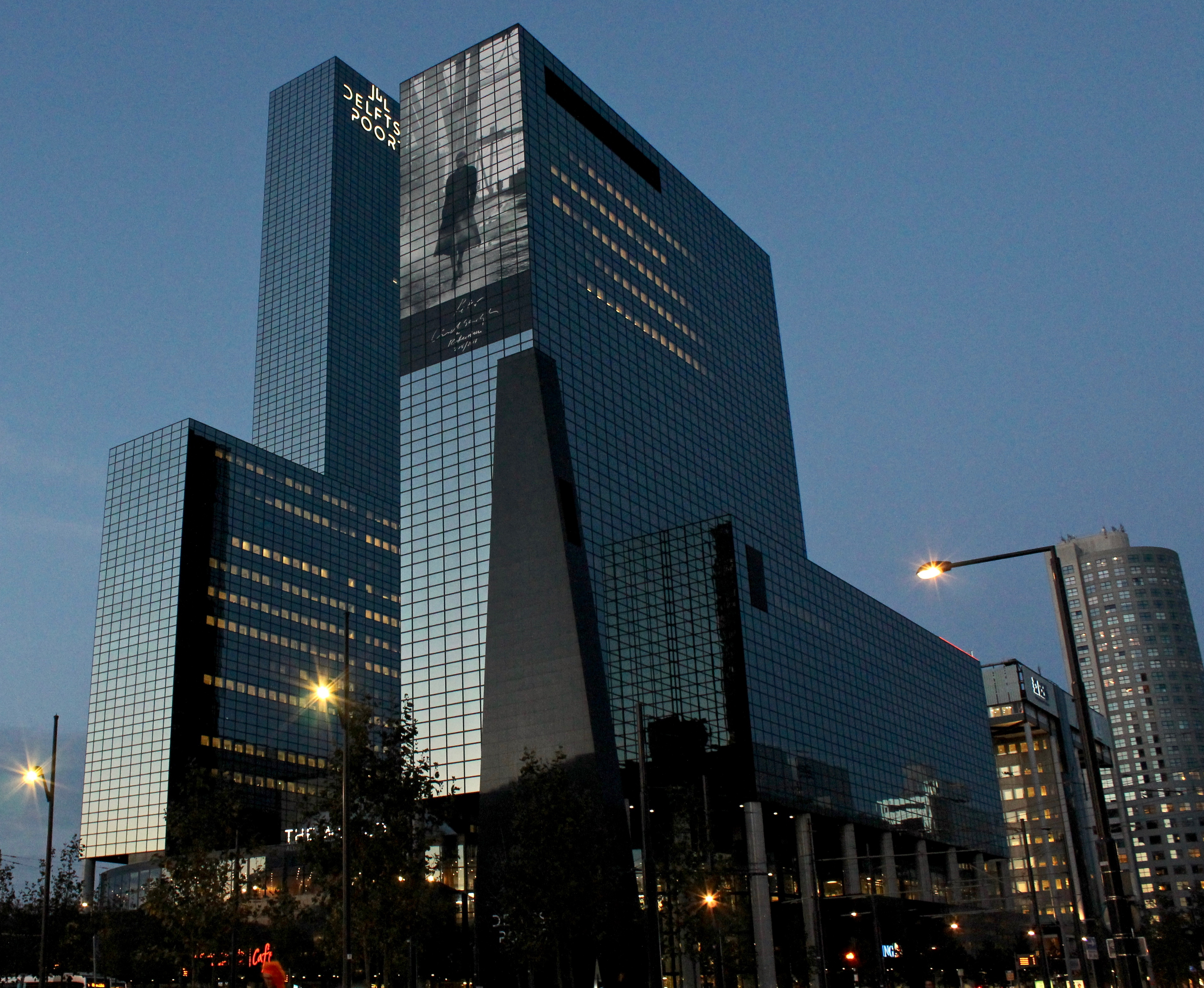
- Interactive map of the Delftse Poort area
- Alternative names: Nationale-Nederlanden

General information
- Type: Commercial offices
- Architectural style: Modernism
- Location: Weena 505; Rotterdam, Netherlands
- Coordinates: 51.92397°N 4.47195°E
- Completed: 1991
- Cost: NLG240 million €110 million
- Owner: CBRE Global Investors, KanAm Grund

Height
- Antenna spire: 164 m (538 ft)
- Roof: Tower I: 151.35 m (496.6 ft); Tower II: 93 m (305 ft)

Technical details
- Floor count: Tower I: 41; Tower II: 25
- Floor area: 106,000 m^{2} (1,140,000 sq ft)

Design and construction
- Architect: Abe Bonnema

Website
- https://www.delftsepoort.nl/

Delftse Poort (English: Delft Gate Building) is a twin-tower skyscraper complex at Weena 505 next to the Rotterdam Centraal railway station in Rotterdam, Netherlands. Tower I is 151.35 m (496.6 ft) tall and has 41 stories, while Tower II is 93 m (305 ft) tall and has 25 stories. Until May 2009, Tower I was the tallest office tower in the Netherlands. Both towers are built over a four-storey multifunctional podium which adjoins the Rotterdam central station. The entire complex is equipped with 28 elevators. The gross floor area in the complex is 106,000 m^{2} (1,140,000 sq ft), and the offices occupy 66,000 m^{2} (710,000 sq ft).

It was constructed between 1988 and 1991. The cost of the construction was 240 million Dutch guilders, or about €110 million. Due to a metro tunnel running underneath the complex, advanced construction methods were required, allowing only a single underground floor to be built. The building is also known as Nationale-Nederlanden building, because until 2015 the Dutch Company 'Nationale-Nederlanden' (National-Netherlands) was the main user of the building. Nationale-Nederlanden was the local insurance branch of ING Insurance until 2014. In April 2015, the building was officially reopened by owner CBRE Global Investors as a general-purpose office building with 65,000 m^{2} (700,000 sq ft) of office space. Nationale-Nederlanden became a tenant renting only a third of the building complex, and hence their logo on Tower I was removed. Since then the building has established its own identity, displaying its own logo on Tower I.

Until 2004, an annual race up the building's stairs took place in this building.

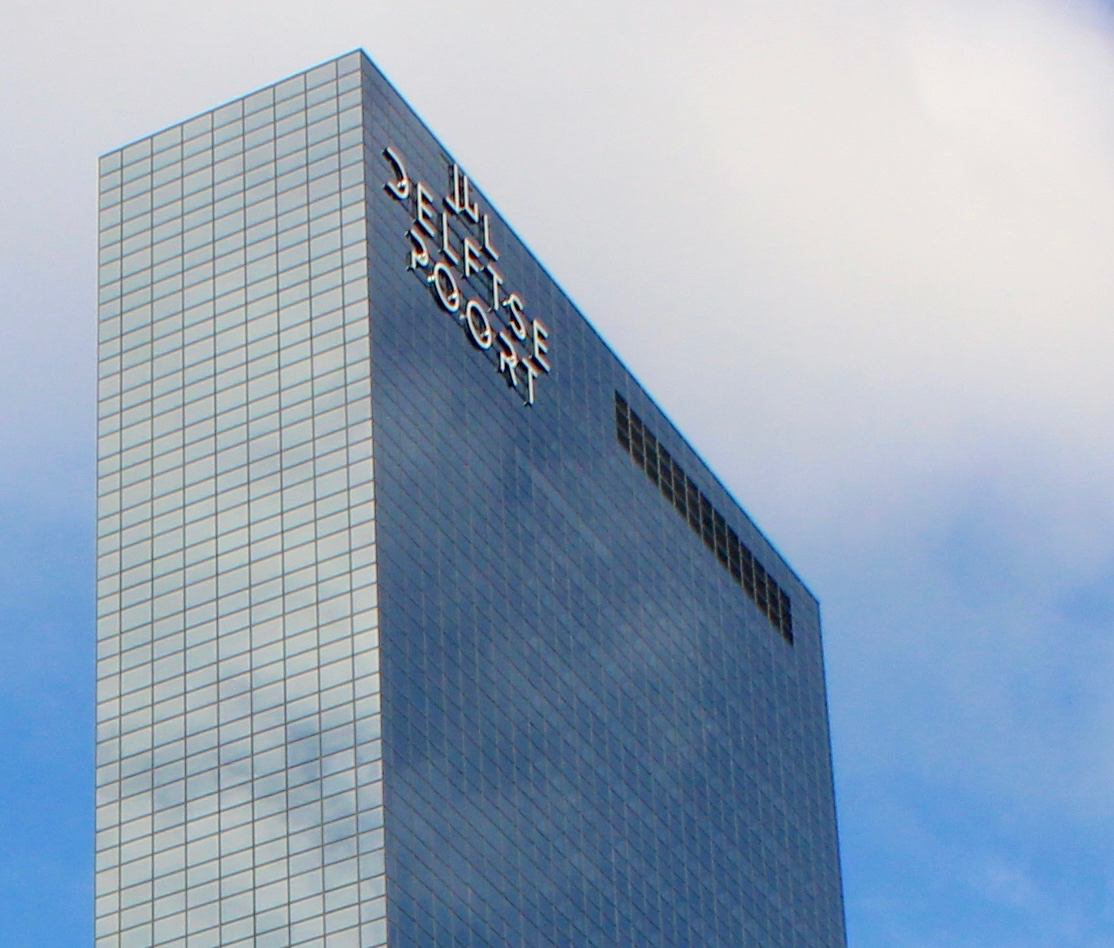
Delftse Poort logo

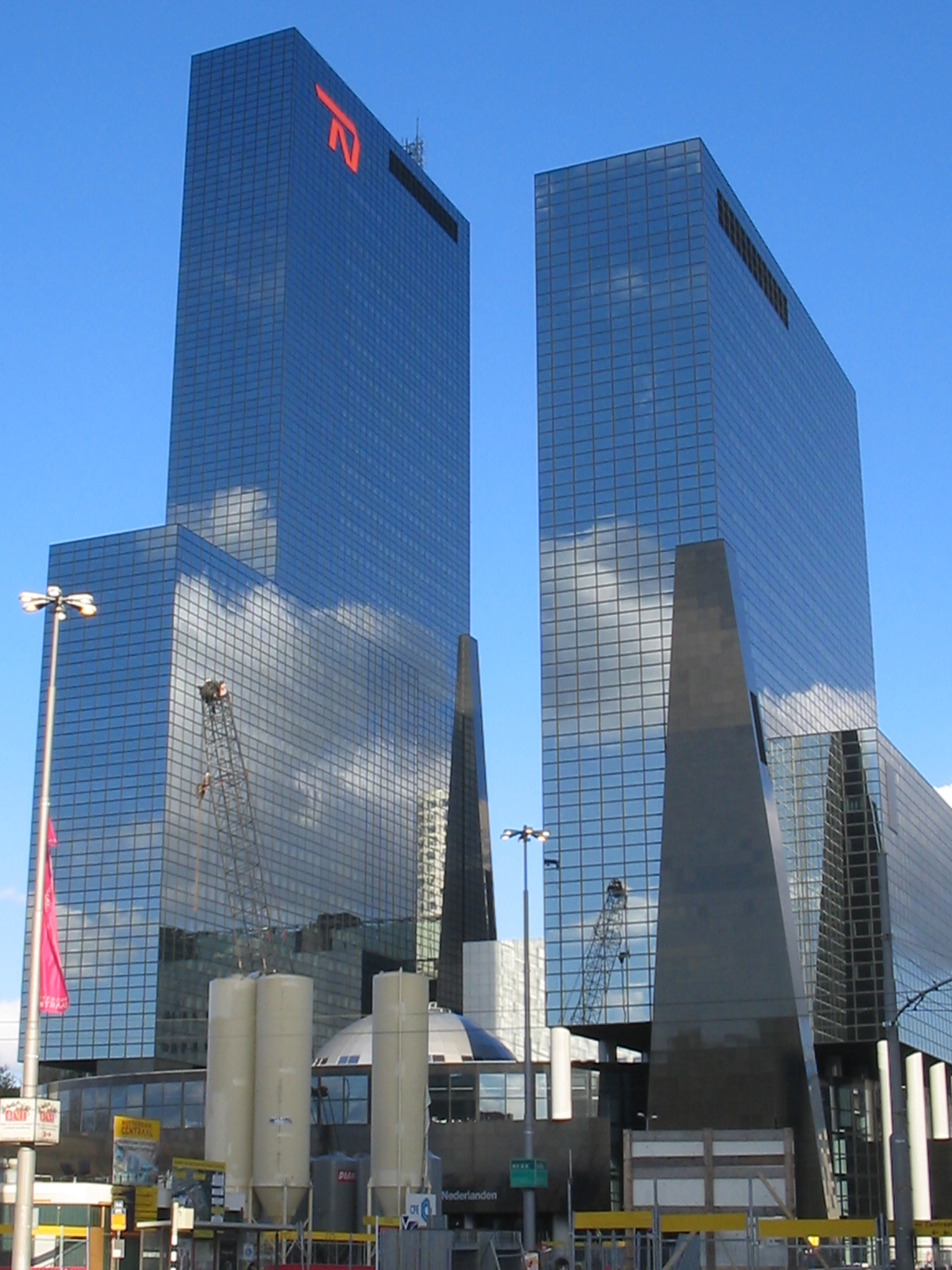
Nationale-Nederlanden in Delftse poort

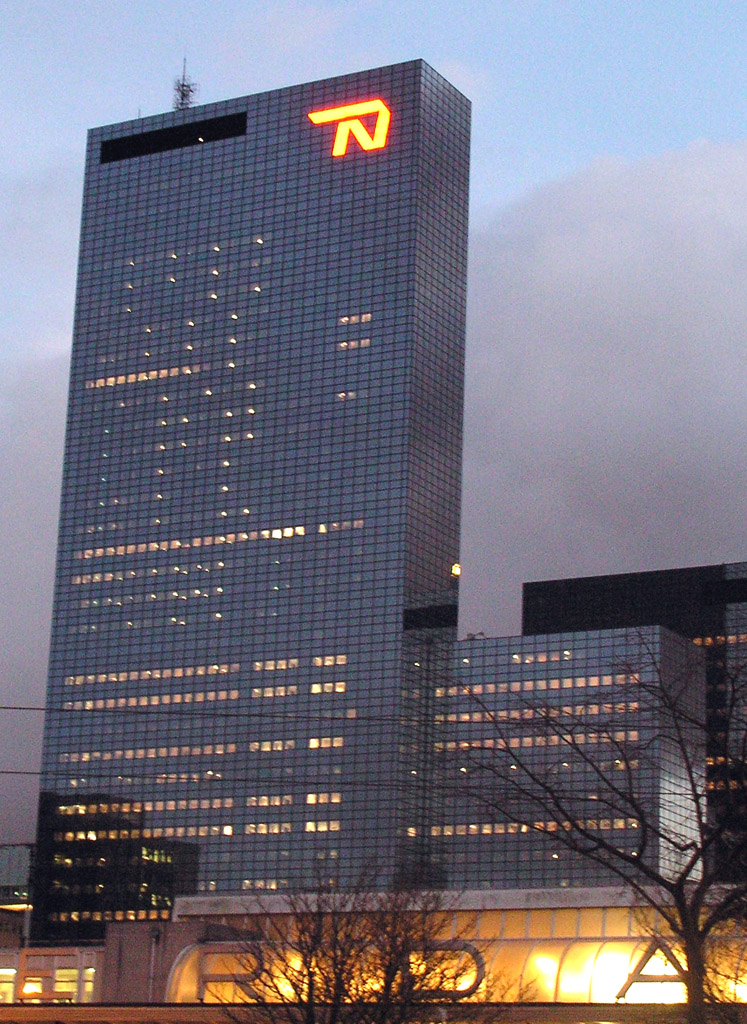
NN logo

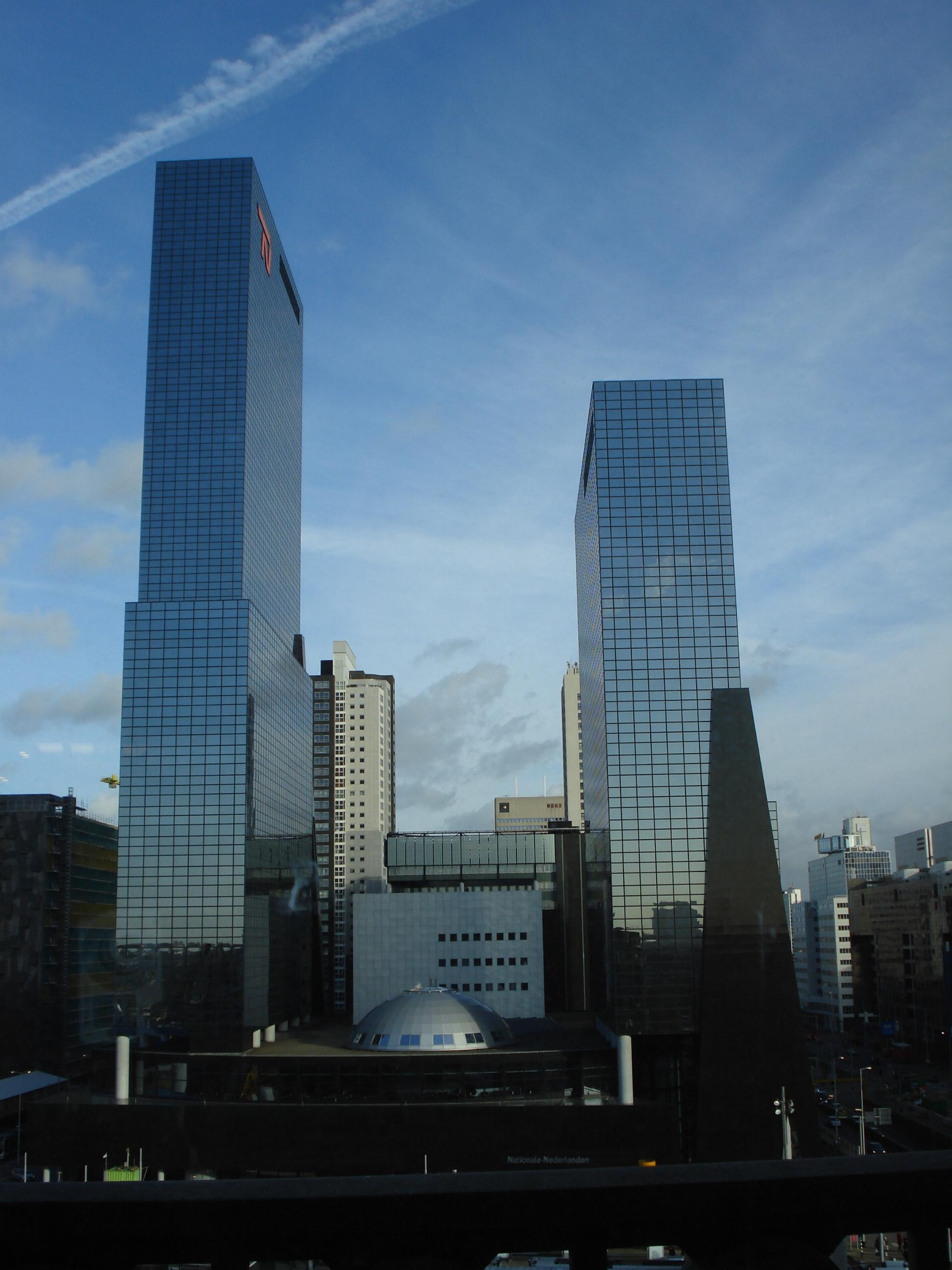
Delftse poort

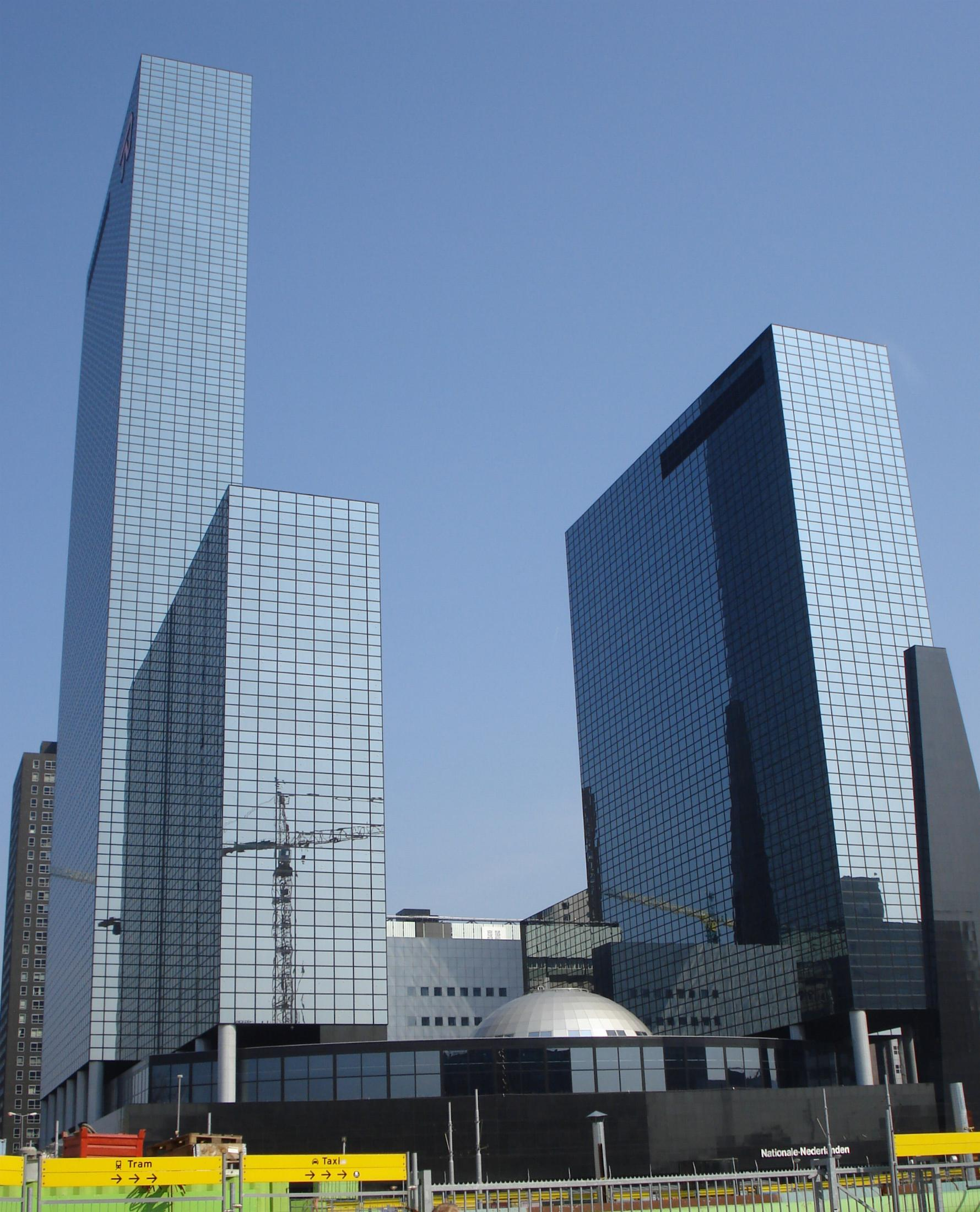
Delftse poort
