= De Zalmhaven =

Project that includes a 215m residential tower in Rotterdam, the Netherlands

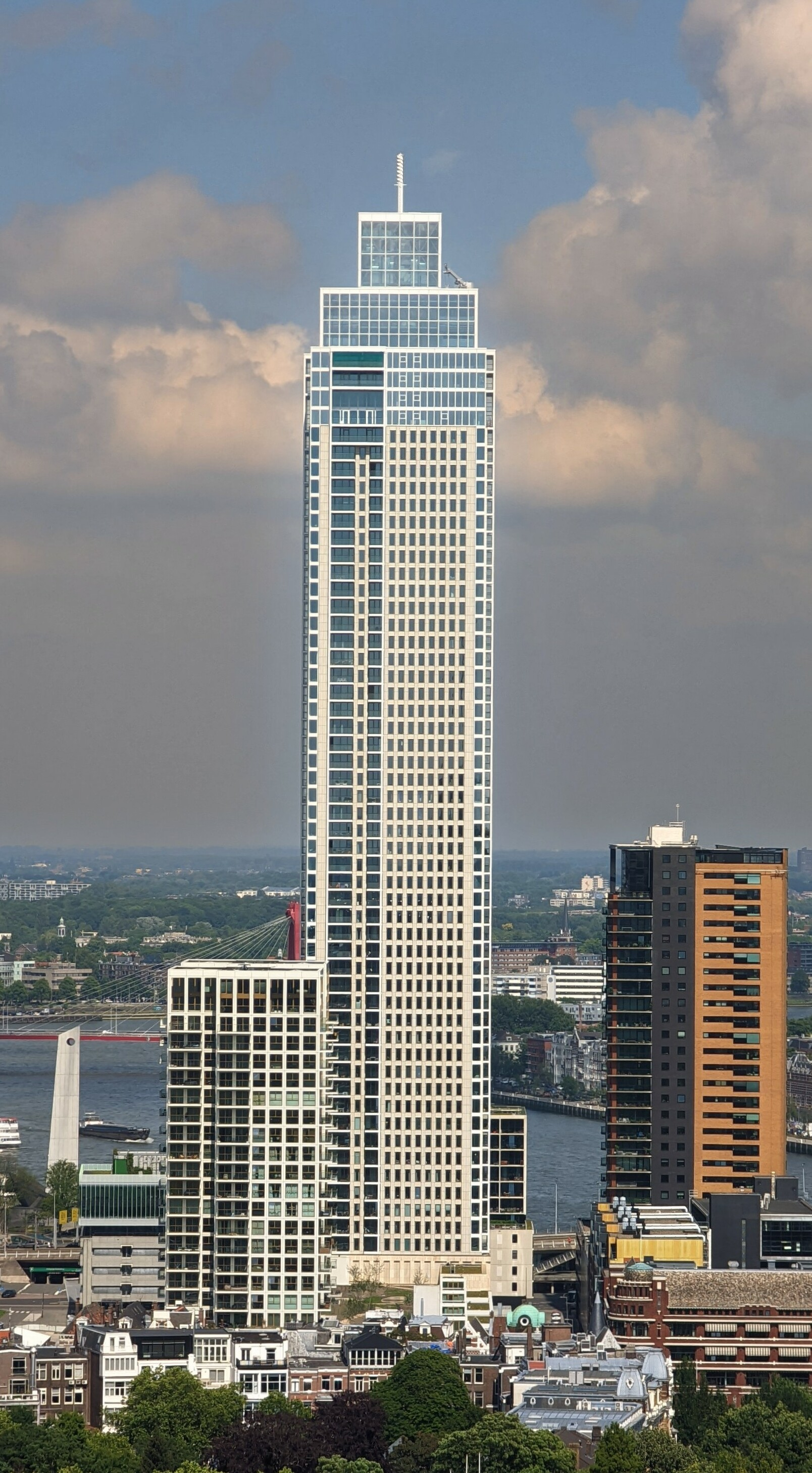
- Interactive map of the De Zalmhaven area

General information
- Status: Completed
- Type: Residential
- Location: Rotterdam, Netherlands
- Coordinates: 51°54′37″N 4°28′50″E
- Construction started: 25 October 2018
- Completed: 2022

Height
- Architectural: 215 metres (705 ft)
- Roof: 203 metres (666 ft)

Technical details
- Floor count: 61
- Lifts/elevators: 4

Design and construction
- Architects: Dam & Partners
- Main contractor: LSI, AM & Amvest

Website
- www.dezalmhaven.com

De Zalmhaven, also referred to as Zalmhaventoren, is a residential tower complex in Rotterdam, the Netherlands. The main tower of the complex, Zalmhaven I, reaches 215 metres (705 ft) in height, while the other two buildings reach 70 metres (230 ft) each. The project was approved by the city in February 2010.

Zalmhaven I houses 295 apartments and a parking garage. The tower and a second office building were designed by Dam & Partners Architecten, with Claus en Kaan Architecten designing a residential unit. It is the tallest prefab tower in the world, the tallest residential tower in Benelux and the tallest building in the Netherlands.

== History ==
In September 2016, the Rotterdam city council approved the plan. After fifteen years of preparation, construction started on 25 October 2018. With Zalmhaven I, the Zalmhaven has a height of 215 meters. The roof height is 203 metres (666 ft), while the mast takes up the last 12 metres (39 ft) of height.

On 15 December 2020, the construction of Zalmhaven II and III reached their highest points. Zalmhaven I reached its highest point in September 2021, and the entire project was completed in April 2022.

== Layout and design ==
De Zalmhaven contains 452 apartments and penthouses, 33 townhouses, a parking garage, offices, commercial spaces and a restaurant. The townhouses have a private roof terrace and the apartments and penthouses all have one or more outdoor spaces. The basement accommodates a five-story parking garage with 456 spaces. An inner garden will be realized in the lobby. There is a communal roof garden on the parking garage that is only accessible to the residents of De Zalmhaven. The apartments and penthouses in De Zalmhaven II and III have their own entrance at Gedempte Zalmhaven, but residents may also use the facilities in De Zalmhaven I.

Records
Preceded by Maastoren	Tallest building in the Netherlands; 215 metres (705 ft); 2021–present	Current holder
