= List of tallest buildings in The Hague =

Skyline of The Hague Skyline van Den Haag
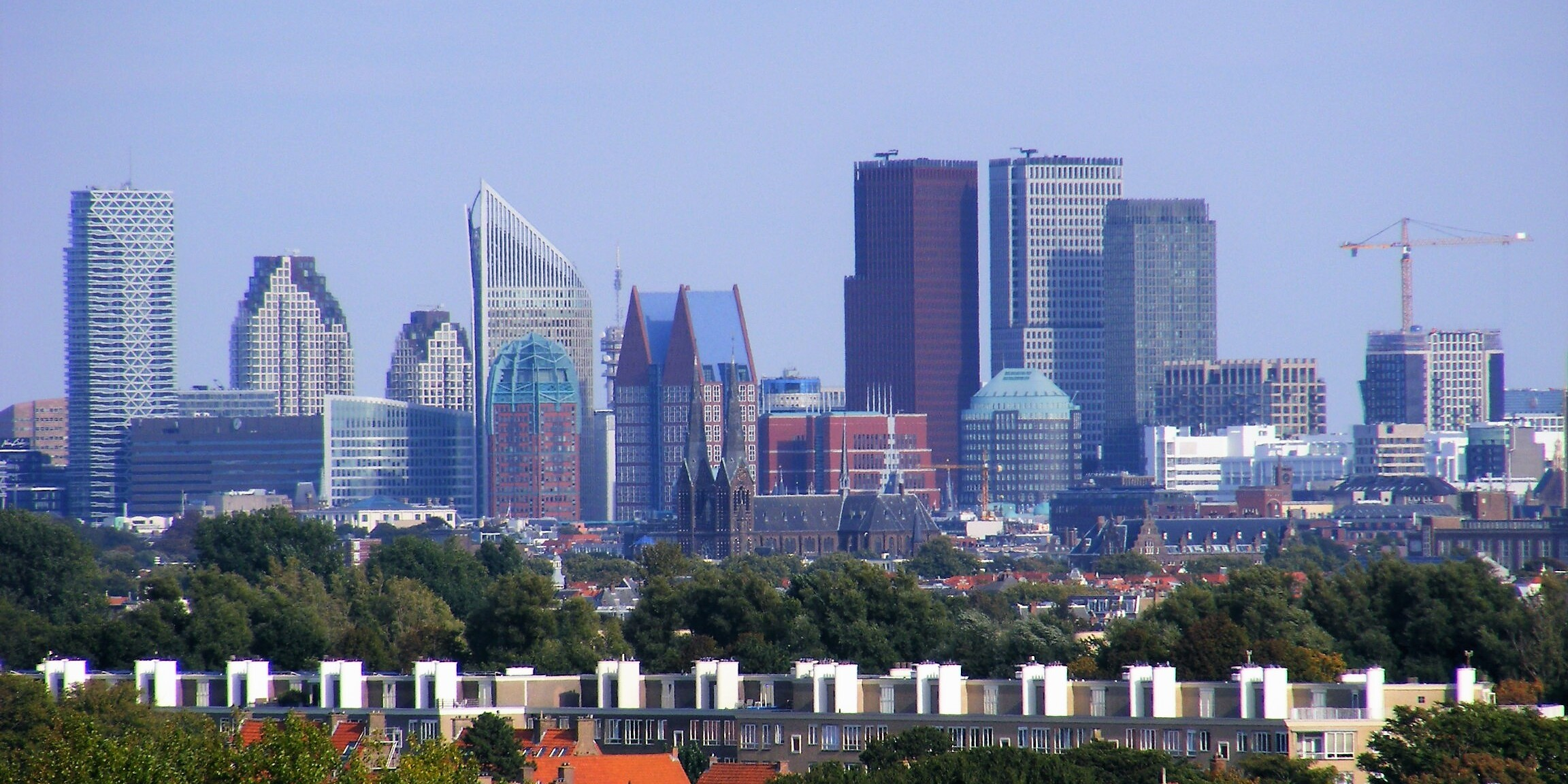
- The Hague in 2022
- Tallest building: Ministerie van Justitie (2012)
- Tallest building height: 146 m (479 ft)

Number of tall buildings (2026)
- Taller than 75 m (246 ft): 31
- Taller than 100 m (328 ft): 11

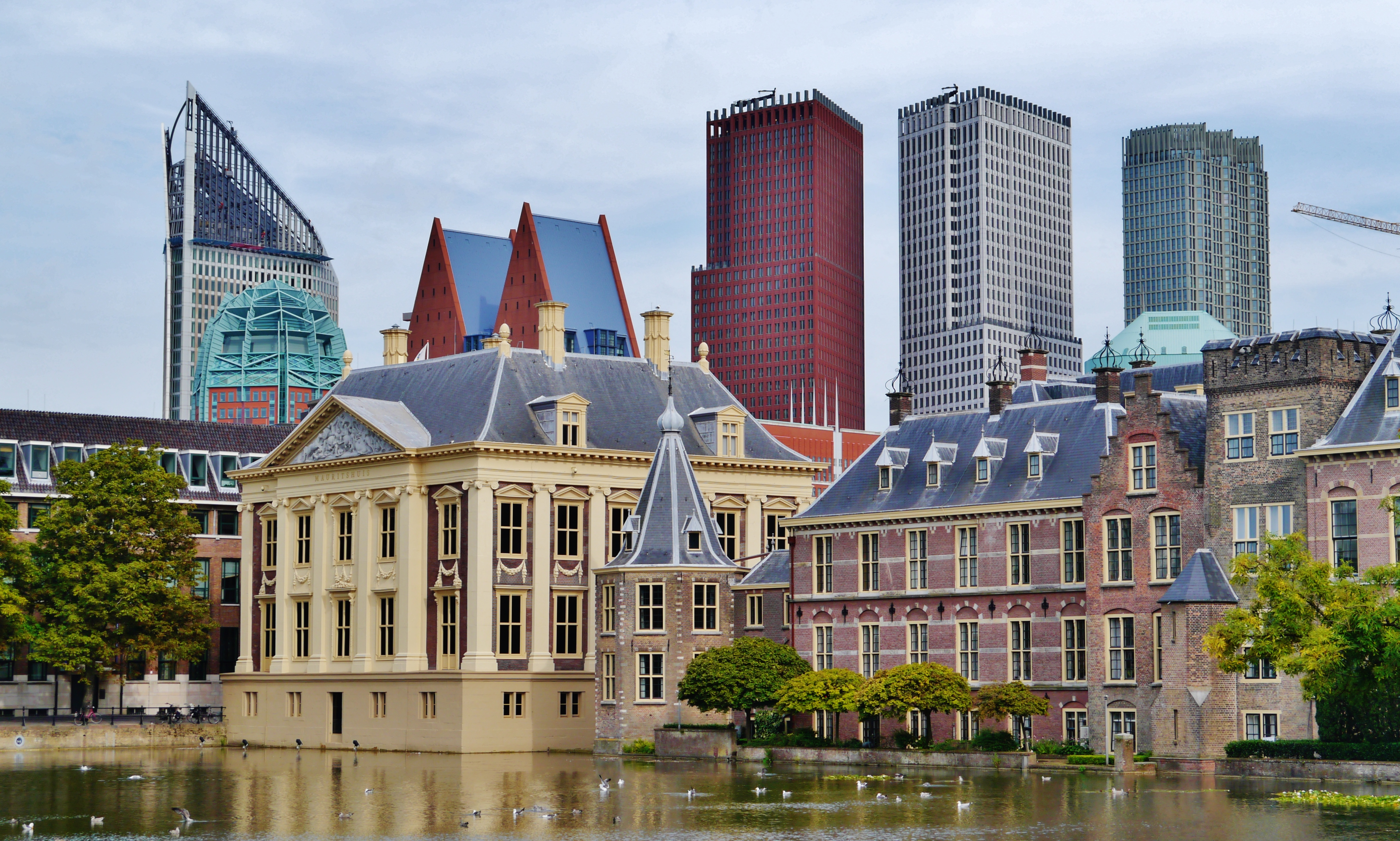
Modern skyscrapers of Centrum behind the Mauritshuis art museum and the Binnenhof

The Hague, the third-largest city in the Netherlands, has one of the largest skylines in the Low Countries, with 31 high-rises taller than 75 m (246 ft) as of 2026, 11 of which have a height greater than 100 m (328 ft). As the Netherlands' administrative centre and seat of government, some of its skyscrapers house the country's governmental institutions. The tallest building in the Hague is tied between Ministerie van Justitie and Ministerie van Binnenlandse Zaken, which are both 146 m (479 ft) metres tall. Completed in 2012, the buildings are home to the Ministry of Justice and Security and the Ministry of the Interior and Kingdom Relations respectively. The third tallest building, Hoftoren, is the location of the Ministry of Education, Culture and Science.

For much of its history, the tallest structure in The Hague was the Great Church, or St. James's Church, which was built between the 14th to 16th centuries. The first high-rises appeared in the mid-20th century. As the number of tall buildings grew, the city centre area around Den Haag Centraal railway station formed the centre of an emerging skyline, with office buildings such as the 77 m (253 ft) Witte Anna and the 88 m (289 ft) Zurichtoren. The rate of high-rise construction has increased in the 21st century. Residential high-rise developments have become more prominent, notably with the four-tower Prinsenhof residential complex in 2005 and the 132 m (432 ft) Het Strijkijzer in 2008. Between 2010 and 2012, a host of towers were completed in the city centre, including the New Babylon complex, De Kroon, and the two tallest buildings that house the aforementioned ministries.

Most of the tallest buildings in The Hague are in the city centre districts of Centrum and Haagse Hout. The largest concentration of skyscrapers are located around Den Haag Centraal. Many high-rises reflect the influence of traditional and modern Dutch architecture, such as Castalia, whose pitched roofs were inspired by Dutch canal houses. The Hague is the main city of the Haaglanden urban area, which has a number of modern high-rises in its other cities of Delft, Rijswijk, and Zoetermeer. The Hague forms a larger metropolitan area with Rotterdam, with around 2.7 million inhabitants. Together, the Rotterdam–The Hague metropolitan area has over 30 skyscrapers taller than 100 m (328 ft), making it one of the metropolitan areas with the most skyscrapers in Europe.

== History ==
Number of buildings by height in The Hague by the end of each year, based on the list below. This excludes free-standing structures such as church spires. Click on the legend to toggle a specific height on or off. View chart definition.

== Cityscape ==
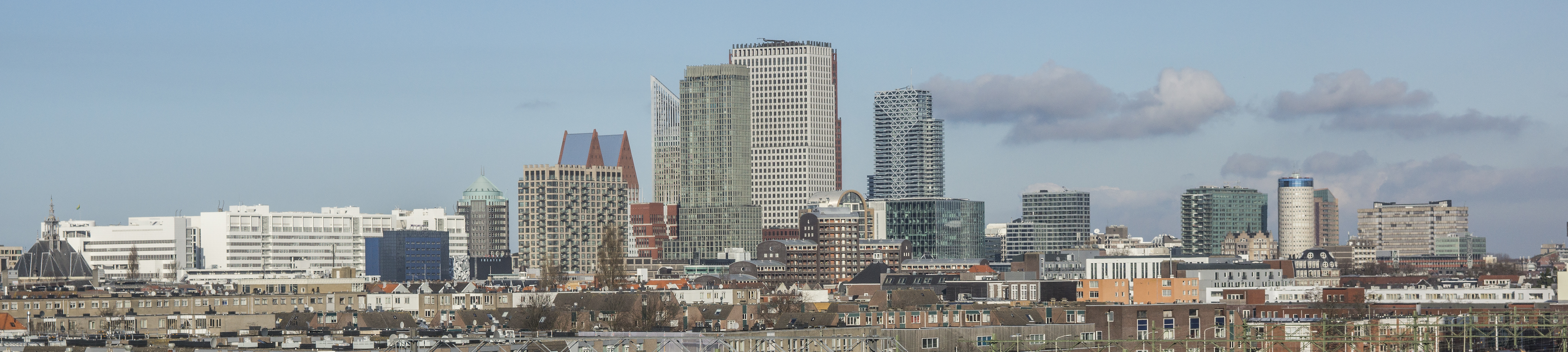
Skyline of The Hague in 2017

== Map of tallest buildings ==
The map below shows the location of buildings taller than 75 m (246 ft) in the city centre of The Hague. Each marker is numbered by the building's height rank, and colored by the decade of its completion. Several buildings in The Hague are located outside of this map, and are denoted with an asterisk.

Buildings taller than 75 m (246 ft) in The Hague city centre. An asterisk (*) next to the building's name indicates it is located outside the map.
- 1960s
- 1970s
- 1980s
- 1990s
- 2000s
- 2010s
- 2020s
1 Ministerie van Justitie
2 Ministerie van Binnenlandse Zaken
3 Hoftoren
4 New Babylon City Tower
5 Het Strijkijzer
6 De Kroon
7 Grotius I
8 Prinsenhof
9 Castalia
10 New Babylon Park Tower
11 Grotius II
12 Adagio
13 Zurichtoren
14 Leonardo da Vinci I*
15 Bolero
16 Muzentoren
17 Witte Anna
18 Escamp Municipal District Office*
19 Hoge Regentesse*
20 Prinsenhof Residential Block 1
21 Prinsenhof Residential Block 2
22 Prinsenhof Residential Block 3
23 De Zilveren Toren
24 TPG Post
25 Malietoren
26 Paleis van Justitie
27 Centre Court
28 Couperustoren*
29 Wijnhavenkwartier
30 The Y
31 De Evert*

== Tallest buildings ==
This list ranks completed buildings in The Hague that stand at least 75 m (246 ft) tall, based on standard height measurement. This includes spires and architectural details but does not include antenna masts. The “Year” column indicates the year of completion. Buildings tied in height are sorted by year of completion, and then alphabetically.

Was the tallest free-standing structure in The Hague upon completion

Rank	Name	Image	Location	Height m (ft)	Floors	Year	Purpose	Notes
1	Ministerie van Justitie		Centrum 52°04′46″N 4°19′19″E	146 (479)	37	2012	Office	Joint-tallest building in The Hague, alongside Ministerie van Binnenlandse Zaken. Tallest building completed in The Hague in the 2010s.
2	Ministerie van Binnenlandse Zaken		Centrum 52°04′45″N 4°19′19″E	146 (479)	37	2012	Office	Joint-tallest building in The Hague, alongside Ministerie van Justitie. Tallest building completed in The Hague in the 2010s.
3	Hoftoren		Centrum 52°04′51″N 4°19′19″E	141.9 (466)	29	2003	Office	Tallest building in The Hague from 2003 to 2012. Tallest building completed in The Hague in the 2000s.
4	New Babylon City Tower	New Babylon	Centrum 52°04′59″N 4°19′31″E	141.8 (465)	45	2012	Residential	
5	Het Strijkijzer		Centrum 52°04′18″N 4°19′28″E	131.6 (432)	41	2008	Residential	Also known as "Haagse Toren" (The Hague Tower).
6	De Kroon		Centrum 52°04′44″N 4°19′15″E	131.2 (430)	41	2011	Residential	
7	Grotius I		Haagse Hout 52°04′54″N 4°19′43″E	120 (394)	38	2022	Residential	The taller of the two Grotius towers. Also known as The Roof I. Tallest building completed in The Hague in the 2020s. Tallest building in Haagse Hout.
8	Prinsenhof		Haagse Hout 52°04′45″N 4°20′15″E	109.5 (359)	25	2005	Office	Tallest building in the Prinsenhof residential complex Also known as the World Trade Center.
9	Castalia		Centrum 52°04′48″N 4°19′15″E	104 (341)	20	1998	Office	Location of the Ministry of Health, Welfare and Sport and the Ministry of Social Affairs and Employment. Tallest building in The Hague from 1998 to 2003. Tallest building completed in The Hague in the 1990s.
10	New Babylon Park Tower		Centrum 52°04′56″N 4°19′30″E	101.6 (333)	31	2011	Residential	
11	Grotius II		Haagse Hout 52°04′52″N 4°19′44″E	100 (328)	32	2022	Residential	The shorter of the two Grotius towers. Also known as The Roof II
12	Adagio	–	Centrum 52°04′40″N 4°19′10″E	92 (302)	28	2023	Residential	
N/A	Grote or Sint-Jacobskerk		Centrum 52°04′39″N 4°18′24″E	93 (305)	N/A	1424	Religious	Tallest free-standing structure in The hague for over five centuries, from 1424 to 1998.
N/A	Sint-Jacobuskerk		Centrum 52°04′59″N 4°18′31″E	91 (299)	N/A	1878	Religious	
13	Zurichtoren		Centrum 52°04′50″N 4°19′14″E	88 (289)	19	1999	Office	
14	Leonardo da Vinci I		Scheveningen 52°06′50″N 4°17′07″E	87 (285)	26	1997	Residential	Tallest building in Scheveningen.
15	Bolero		Centrum 52°04′38″N 4°19′10″E	85 (279)	27	2022	Residential	
N/A	Peace Palace		Scheveningen 52°05′11″N 4°17′45″E	80 (262)	N/A	1913	Government	Translates to Vredespaleis in Dutch.
16	Muzentoren		Centrum 52°04′44″N 4°19′10″E	78 (256)	17	2000	Office	
17	Witte Anna		Haagse Hout 52°04′48″N 4°19′38″E	77 (253)	25	1987	Residential	Tallest building completed in The Hague in the 1980s.
18	One Milkyway		Laak 52°04′02″N 4°20′54″E	77 (253)	22	2026	Mixed-use	Tallest building in Laak.
19	Escamp Municipal District Office		Escamp 52°02′42″N 4°16′49″E	76 (249)	17	2011	Mixed-use	Tallest building in Escamp. Also known as Stadsdeelkantoor Escamp in Dutch.
20	Hoge Regentesse		Centrum 52°04′21″N 4°17′30″E	76 (249)	23	2020	Residential	
21	Prinsenhof Residential Block 1		Haagse Hout 52°04′46″N 4°20′13″E	75.1 (246)	22	2005	Residential	Part of the Prinsenhof residential complex.
22	Prinsenhof Residential Block 2		Haagse Hout 52°04′48″N 4°20′12″E	75.1 (246)	22	2005	Residential	Part of the Prinsenhof residential complex.
23	Prinsenhof Residential Block 3		Haagse Hout 52°04′49″N 4°20′10″E	75.1 (246)	22	2005	Residential	Part of the Prinsenhof residential complex.
24	De Zilveren Toren		Haagse Hout 52°04′46″N 4°20′04″E	75 (246)	16	1969	Office	Tallest building completed in The Hague in the 1960s.
25	TPG Post		Haagse Hout 52°04′43″N 4°20′08″E	75 (246)	19	1986	Office	Also known as EDGE The Hague.
26	Malietoren		Haagse Hout 52°05′03″N 4°19′36″E	75 (246)	19	1996	Office	
27	Paleis van Justitie		Haagse Hout 52°04′57″N 4°19′47″E	75 (246)	19	1996	Office	
28	Centre Court		Haagse Hout 52°04′55″N 4°20′00″E	75 (246)	17	2003	Office	
29	Couperustoren	–	Leidschenveen-Ypenburg 52°03′12″N 4°23′11″E	75 (246)	22	2013	Residential	Tallest building in Leidschenveen-Ypenburg.
30	Wijnhavenkwartier		Centrum 52°04′42″N 4°19′12″E	75 (246)	20	2016	Mixed-use	Mixed-use residential and educational building.
31	The Y	–	Centrum 52°04′16″N 4°19′28″E	75 (246)	22	2017	Residential	
32	De Evert	–	Laak 52°04′04″N 4°20′16″E	75 (246)	23	2024	Residential	

== Tallest under construction or proposed ==
=== Under construction ===
The following table ranks skyscrapers and high-rises under construction in The Hague that are expected to be at least 75 m (246 ft) tall as of 2026, based on standard height measurement. The “Year” column indicates the expected year of completion. Buildings that are on hold are not included.

Name	Height m (ft)	Floors	Year	Purpose	Notes
The Grace I	139 (456)	43	2029	Residential	
The Blox	128 (420)	38	2027	Residential	
The Grace II	105 (344)	32	2029	Residential	
KJ Den Haag 1	93 (305)	28	2026	Residential	
KJ Den Haag 2	93 (305)	28	2026	Residential	
Maestro	75 (246)	23	2026	Residential	
Struijck II	75 (246)	23	2028-29	Residential	

== Timeline of tallest buildings ==
The following table lists the buildings and free-standing structures that have once been the tallest building in The Hague.

Name	Image	Years as tallest	Height m (ft)	Floors	Notes
Grote or Sint-Jacobskerk		1424–1998	93 (305)	N/A	
Castalia		1998–2003	104 (341)	20	
Hoftoren		2003–2012	142 (466)	29	
Ministry of Justice and Security		2012–present	146 (479)	37	
Ministry of the Interior and Kingdom Relations		2012–present	146 (479)	37	

== See also ==
- List of tallest buildings in the Netherlands
- List of tallest buildings in Amsterdam
- List of tallest buildings in Eindhoven
- List of tallest buildings in Rotterdam
- List of tallest buildings in Utrecht
