= List of tallest buildings in the Netherlands =

This list article contains data about Dutch buildings of at least 100 metres (330 ft) high – essentially all modern, fairly recent buildings/towers, but also including two old church towers over 100m, the tallest of which (the Dom Tower of Utrecht) was completed in 1382.

The top-ten tallest buildings in the Netherlands all stand in two cities of the country (Rotterdam, and The Hague), with Rotterdam holding the top seven tallest buildings in 2026.

After much of Rotterdam was bombed and destroyed in the German invasion of the Netherlands in 1940, the people of Rotterdam chose to rebuild their city with modernistic architecture, instead of rebuilding in a more traditional style. In 1991, the Delftse Poort office towers, right by Rotterdam Central railway station, became the first Dutch skyscraper complex to breach 150 m (500 ft), and practically ended the debate whether the country had any true skyscrapers at all.

The generally infirm nature of Dutch soil types, with bedrock typically only found at considerable depth, generally makes the foundation engineering of very tall buildings quite challenging, and Delftse Poort remained the country's tallest tower until May 2009. Nevertheless, since it was built, it inspired new towers between 100m and 150m tall to be created in many Dutch cities and towns. In 2022, Rotterdam raised the bar once again by 50 m (200 ft) when the 215 m (705 ft) Zalmhaven tower was opened.

== Buildings ==
Was the tallest building in Netherlands upon completion

The listed heights exclude flagpoles, antennae and other such elements. Only finished buildings are listed.

	Name	Height	Year	Floors	City	Image
1	Zalmhaven	215 m (705 ft)	2022	59	Rotterdam	
2	Maastoren	164.8 m (541 ft)	2010	44	Rotterdam	
3	New Orleans	158.4 m (520 ft)	2010	46	Rotterdam	
4	Cooltoren	153.7 m (504 ft)	2022	51	Rotterdam	
5	Montevideo	152.3 m (500 ft)	2005	43	Rotterdam	
6	Delftse Poort	151.4 m (497 ft)	1991	41	Rotterdam	
7	De Rotterdam	151.3 m (496 ft)	2013	45	Rotterdam	
8	Ministerie van Binnenlandse Zaken en Koninkrijksrelaties	146 m (479 ft)	2012	37	The Hague	
9	Ministerie van Veiligheid en Justitie	146 m (479 ft)	2012	37	The Hague	
10	Hoftoren	141.9 m (466 ft)	2003	29	The Hague	
11	New Babylon: City Tower	141.8 m (465 ft)	2013	45	The Hague	
12	Westpoint Tower	141.6 m (465 ft)	2004	48	Tilburg	
13	Rembrandttoren	135 m (443 ft)	1995	35	Amsterdam	
14	World Port Center	134 m (440 ft)	2001	38	Rotterdam	
15	Het Strijkijzer	132 m (433 ft)	2008	41	The Hague	
16	De Kroon	131 m (430 ft)	2011	41	The Hague	
17	Millennium Tower	130.9 m (429 ft)	2000	34	Rotterdam	
18	FIRST Rotterdam	128 m (420 ft)	2015	31	Rotterdam	
19	The Red Apple	127 m (417 ft)	2009	40	Rotterdam	
20	Mondriaantoren	123 m (404 ft)	2002	31	Amsterdam	
21	Carlton	120 m (394 ft)	2010	33	Almere	
22	Erasmus MC	120 m (394 ft)	2012	31	Rotterdam	
23	Grotius I	120 (394)	2022	38	The Hague	
24	Achmeatoren	115 m (377 ft)	2002	28	Leeuwarden	
25	De Rokade	113 m (371 ft)	2010	33	Spijkenisse	
26	Dom Tower of Utrecht	112.5 m (369 ft)	1382	N/A	Utrecht	
27	Erasmus MC	112 m (367 ft)	1969	27	Rotterdam	
28	CasaNova	110 m (361 ft)	2022	35	Rotterdam	
29	Prinsenhof Toren D/E World Trade Center	110 m (361 ft)	2005	25	The Hague	
30	Lighthouse	109 m (358 ft)	2025	34	Eindhoven	
31	Waterstadtoren	109 m (358 ft)	2004	36	Rotterdam	
32	Nieuwe Kerk	108.8 m (357 ft)	1496	N/A	Delft	
33	Blaak Office Tower	107 m (351 ft)	1996	28	Rotterdam	
34	European Patent Office	107 m (351 ft)	2018	27	Rijswijk	
35	Up:Town	107 m (351 ft)	2019	34	Rotterdam	
36	Weenatoren	106 m (348 ft)	1990	31	Rotterdam	
37	100Hoog	106 m (348 ft)	2013	32	Rotterdam	
38	De Coopvaert	106 m (348 ft)	2006	29	Rotterdam	
39	De Admirant	105 m (344 ft)	2006	31	Eindhoven	
40	Amsterdam Symphony (1)	105 m (344 ft)	2009	29	Amsterdam	
41	Amsterdam Symphony (2)	105 m (344 ft)	2009	27	Amsterdam	
42	Rabobank Bestuurscentrum (Rabotoren)	105 m (344 ft)	2010	27	Utrecht	
43	WTC H Toren	105 m (344 ft)	2004	27	Amsterdam	
44	ABN-AMRO World HQ	105 m (344 ft)	1999	24	Amsterdam	
45	Weenacenter	104 m (341 ft)	1990	32	Rotterdam	
46	The Terraced Tower	104 m (341 ft)	2021	32	Rotterdam	
47	Castalia	104 m (341 ft)	1998	20	The Hague	
48	Amsteltower	103 m (338 ft)	2018	30	Amsterdam	
49	Bunker Toren	103 m (338 ft)	2022	30	Eindhoven	
50	De Hoge Heren (1)	102 m (335 ft)	2000	34	Rotterdam	
51	De Hoge Heren (2)	102 m (335 ft)	2000	34	Rotterdam	
52	New Babylon Park Tower	102 m (335 ft)	2011	31	The Hague	
53	Alphatoren	101 m (331 ft)	2008	29	Enschede	
54	Schielandtoren	101 m (331 ft)	1996	32	Rotterdam	
55	Provinciehuis Noord-Brabant	101 m (331 ft)	1971	23	's-Hertogenbosch	
56	StadsHeer	101 m (331 ft)	26 March 2007	31	Tilburg	
57	Porthos	101 m (331 ft)	2006	32	Eindhoven	
58	Ito-toren	100 m (328 ft)	September 2005	25	Amsterdam	
59	Valley North-Tower	100 m (328 ft)	2021	25	Amsterdam	
60	Grotius II	100 (328)	2022	38	The Hague	

== Under construction/approved/in study ==
=== Under construction ===
- The Sax: Rotterdam, 180 m + 107 m
- Baan Tower: Rotterdam, 159 m
- Post Rotterdam: Rotterdam, 155 m
- Eleven Home: Amsterdam, 143 m
- Live Tower: Amsterdam, 133 m
- Tree House: Rotterdam, 130 m
- The Blox: The Hague, 128 m
- De Modernist: Rotterdam, 123 m
- Lead: Leiden, 115 m
- Y-Towers: Amsterdam, 114 m + 106 m
- BoogieWood: The Hague, 110 m
- Boompjes 60-68: Rotterdam, 110 m
- SPOT: Amsterdam, 108 m
- Wonderwoods: Utrecht, 105 m
- Skymark: The Hague, 103 m
- Eurostaete: Eindhoven, 100 m

=== Approved ===
- RISE: Rotterdam, 286 m + 160 m + 147 m
- Codrico: Rotterdam, 230 m
- Flow Town: Rotterdam, 185 m + 130 m
- District E: Eindhoven, 148 m + 114 m
- The Grace: The Hague, 139 m + 105 m
- MARK: Utrecht, 135 m
- Dutch Mountains: Eindhoven, 133 m + 96 m
- VDMA: Eindhoven, 122 m
- Wisselweg: Almere, 111 m
- The Four: Eindhoven, 109 m
- Amber: Amsterdam, 101 m

=== Study ===
- Rijnhaven: Rotterdam, 250 m + 200 m + 200 m + 120 m
- Fellenoord: Eindhoven, 235 m
- Bellevue: The Hague, 230 m + 230 m
- Kruiskade Weena: Rotterdam, 200 m + 150 m
- Schiekadeblok: Rotterdam, 200 m
- De Laak: The Hague, 190 m + 160 m
- Hart010: Rotterdam, 180 m
- HS Kwartier: The Hague, 165 m + 156 m + 140 m + 140 m
- Stadhuisplein: Eindhoven, 160 m + 140 m + 130 m
- Lumieretoren: Rotterdam, 155 m
- De Caap: Capelle aan den IJssel, 150 m
- Nieuw Pompenburg: Rotterdam, 140 m + 125 m
- Clarissenhof: Tilburg, 133 m
- Lima: Rotterdam, 130 m
- Porter House: Rotterdam, 128 m
- Toorop: Amsterdam: 125 m + 100 m
- Duet: Nijmegen, 122 m
- WTC Toren: Eindhoven, 120 m
- Karsp 14+16: Amsterdam, 120 m
- De Oliebron: Rotterdam, 120 m
- Antonio Vivaldistraat: Amsterdam, 115 m
- Marten Meesweg: Rotterdam, 110 m

== See also ==
- List of tallest buildings in Amsterdam
- List of tallest buildings in Rotterdam
- List of tallest buildings in The Hague
- List of tallest structures in the Netherlands
- List of tallest buildings in Europe
- List of tallest buildings in the world

== Main source ==
- "The Skyscraper Center".
