= New Babylon =

New Babylon may refer to:

- Neo-Babylonian Empire (626 BC–539 BC), a period of Mesopotamian history that is also known as the Chaldean Dynasty
- New Babylon (Constant Nieuwenhuys), the anti-capitalist city designed in 1950 by artist-architect Constant Nieuwenhuys
- New Babylon (Left Behind), a fictional city depicted in the 1995 Left Behind series of books
- New Babylon, The Hague centre in The Hague
- The New Babylon, a 1929 film written and directed by Grigori Kozintsev and Leonid Trauberg
- Whore of Babylon or "Babylon the great", a Christian allegorical figure of evil mentioned in the Book of Revelation in the Bible
- "New Babylon", a 2023 song by Kamelot from The Awakening
- A nickname of Vilnius
