= Grotius Towers =

Skyscraper complex in The Hague, Netherlands

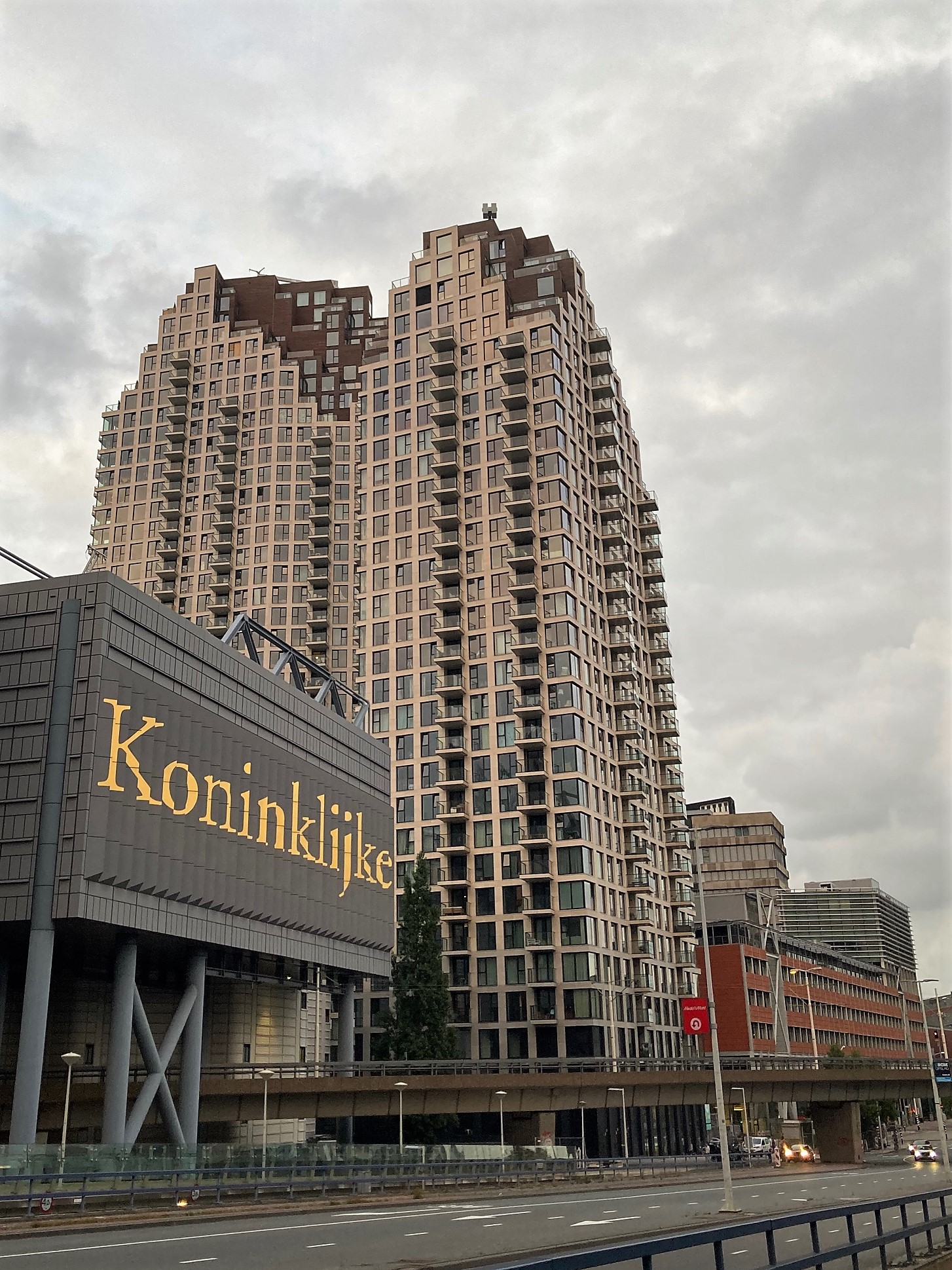
- Interactive map of the Grotius Towers area

General information
- Status: Completed
- Type: Residential
- Location: Maria Stuartplein 2595, The Hague, Netherlands
- Coordinates: 52.081631°N 4.328556°E
- Construction started: 2019
- Completed: 2022

Height
- Roof: 120 m (390 ft) (Tower 1); 100 m (330 ft) (Tower 2)

Technical details
- Structural system: Reinforced concrete
- Floor count: 38 (Tower 1); 32 (Tower 2)

Design and construction
- Architect: MVRDV
- Developer: Provast

The Grotius Towers is a high-rise residential complex in the Haagse Hout district of The Hague, Netherlands. Built between 2019 and 2022, the complex consists of two main towers standing at 120 m (390 ft) with 38 floors (Tower 1) respectively 100 m (330 ft) tall with 32 floors (Tower 2), with the tallest being the 7th tallest building in The Hague.

== History ==
The complex was named after the Dutch lawyer Hugo Grotius and was designed by the MVRDV Studio, who inspired its appearance by voxels, so-called 3D pixels. These pixels form roof terraces for the apartments on the top floors. The towers were built by the construction consortium JP van Eesteren - BESIX, commissioned by Provast. During construction, the building's original elevators will be used, which has the advantage that construction workers can reach the right floor much more quickly. The complex was inaugurated in 2022.

The complex consists of two towers, over 120 and 100 meters tall. Its location next to the A12 Utrechtsebaan highway, which means that it needs to be partially covered to protect the homes from noise, exhaust fumes, and particulate matter. Preparations for this began in early 2021. A total of 655 homes were planned, of which 114 are affordable rental units. The ground floor spaces are reserved for rental, hospitality, commercial and expo businesses.

== Gallery ==
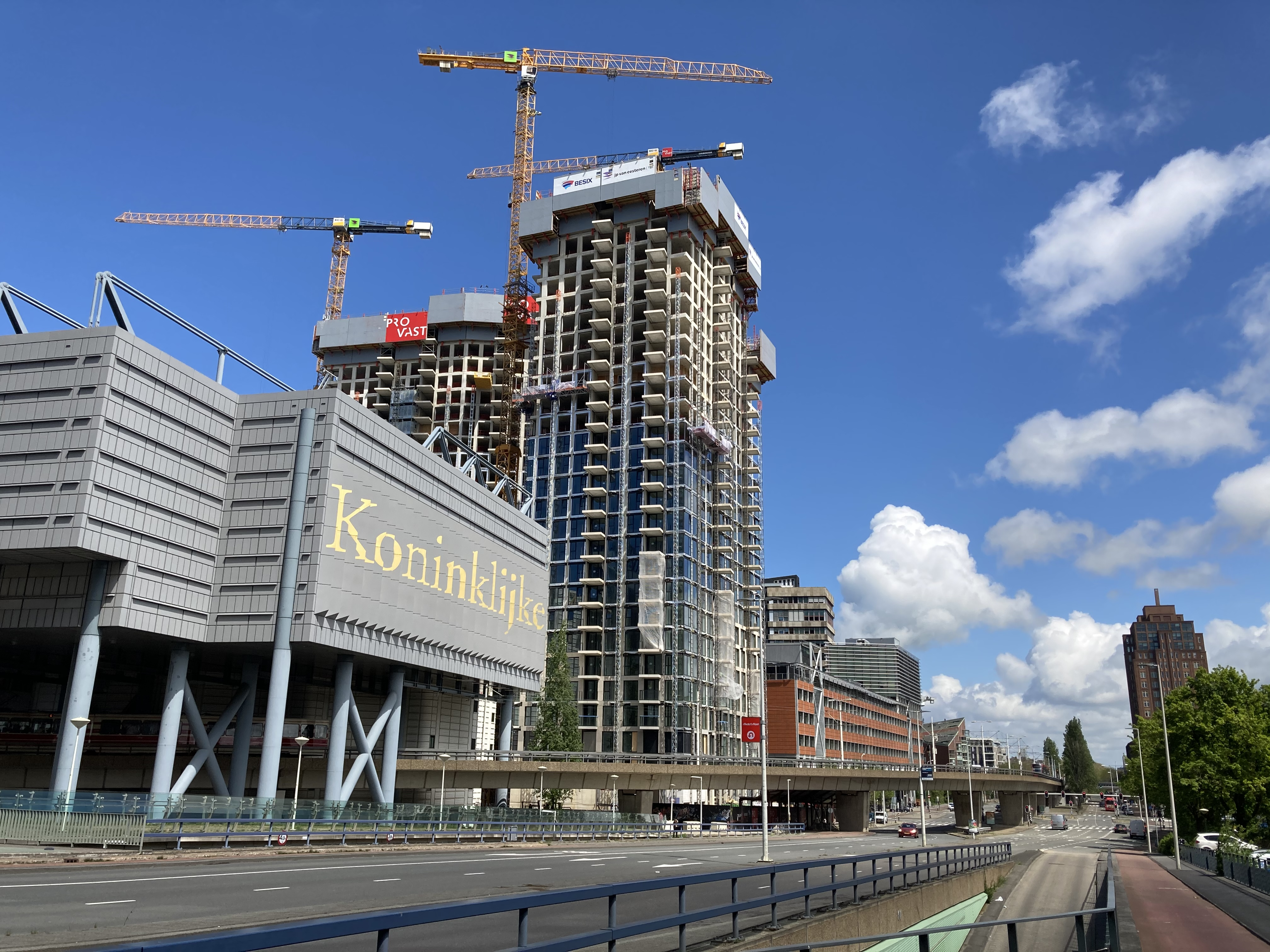
The site under construction in May 2021

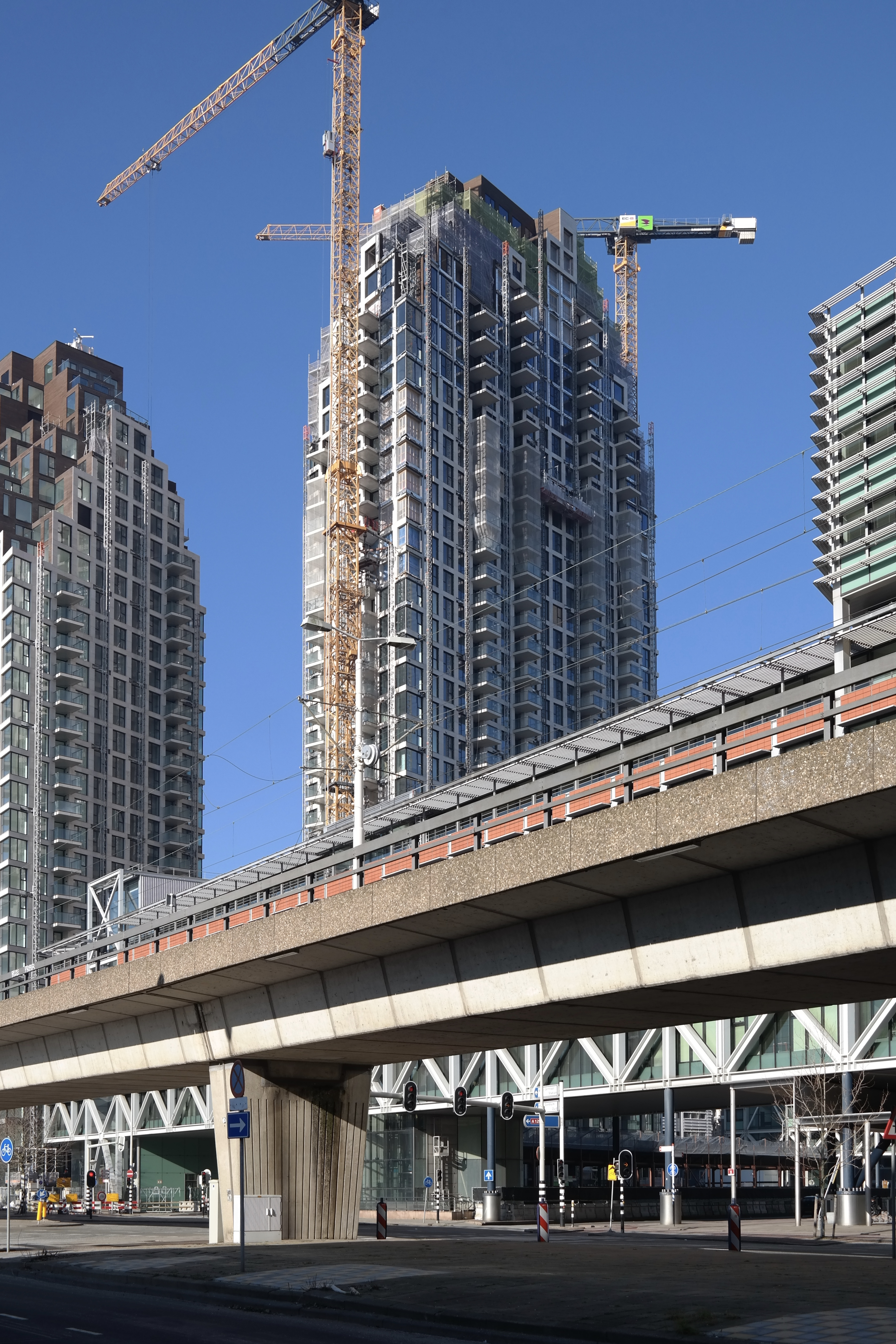
In March 2022

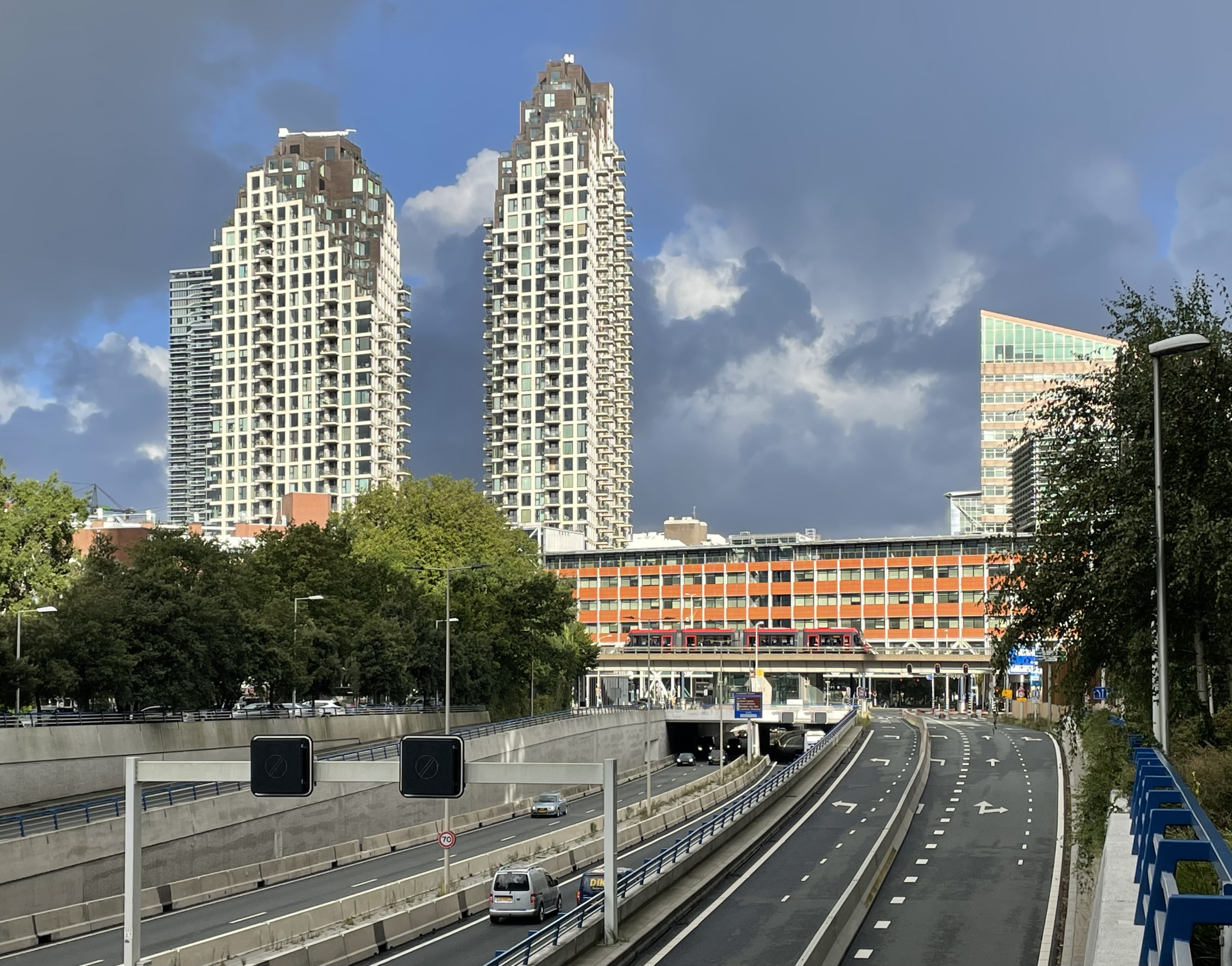
Seen from the Utrechtsebaan (A12)

== See also ==
- List of tallest buildings in the Netherlands
- List of tallest buildings in The Hague
