= New Babylon, The Hague =

Skyscraper complex in The Hague, Netherlands

New Babylon
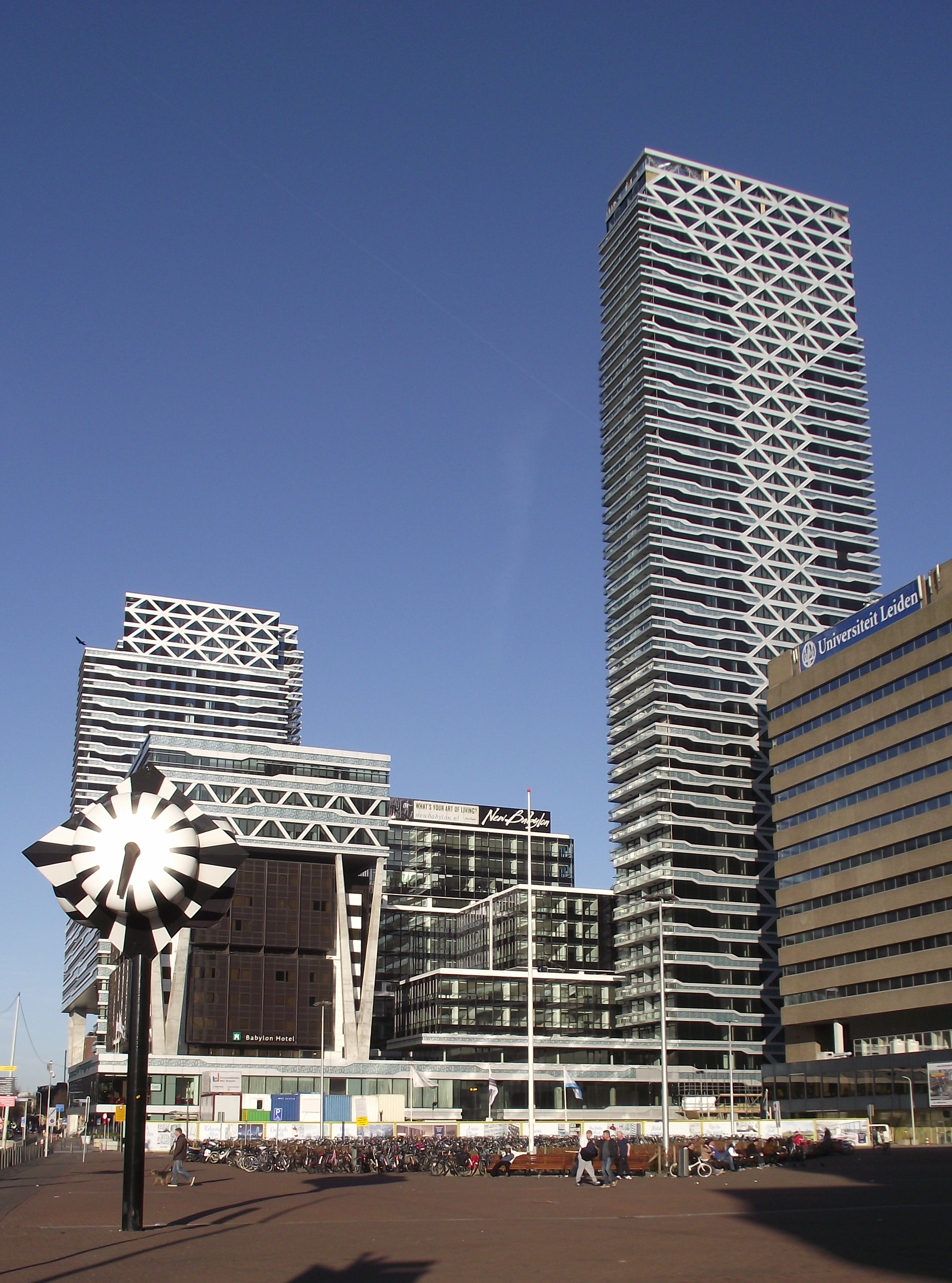
- Interactive map of the New Babylon area

General information
- Status: Completed
- Type: Residential
- Location: Koningin Julianaplein, The Hague, Netherlands
- Coordinates: 52.082985°N 4.325185°E
- Construction started: 2006 (City Tower); 2007 (Park Tower)
- Completed: 2011 (Park Tower); 2013 (City Tower)
- Owner: Babylon Den Haag BV

Height
- Roof: 141.8 m (465 ft) (City Tower); 101.6 m (333 ft) (Park Tower)

Technical details
- Structural system: Reinforced concrete
- Floor count: 45 (City Tower); 31 (Park Tower)
- Floor area: 142,000 m^{2} (1,530,000 sq ft)

Design and construction
- Architects: Meyer and Van Schooten (MVSA)
- Developer: Fortress & SNS Property Finance BV
- Structural engineer: Corsmit Raadgevende Ingenieurs
- Main contractor: J.P. van Eesteren, Ballast Nedam & Bouwcombinatie New Babylon vof

The New Babylon is a high-rise residential complex in The Hague, Netherlands. Built between 2006 and 2013, the complex consists of two main towers standing at 141.8 m (465 ft) tall with 45 floors (City Tower) respectively 101.6 m (333 ft) with 31 floors (Park Tower), with the tallest being the 4th tallest building in The Hague.

== History ==
=== Design ===
The New Babylon, designed by the architectural firm Meyer and Van Schooten, replaces the Babylon complex. This "old" Babylon building was completed in 1978 and consisted of offices, a hotel, a shopping center, and a cinema. It was only partially demolished, but was renovated and expanded, becoming almost partially enclosed by two residential towers. The hotel's original facade is still visible between two V-shaped concrete structures.

New Babylon consists of several shops on the ground floor, offices, the two residential towers, and the hotel. The north side of the complex is marked by a 102-meter-high residential tower, the 'Park Tower'. On the south side stands the 142-meter-high 'City Tower'. This residential tower is crowned by a 16-meter-high flagpole, the tallest in the Netherlands.

In 2011, the City Tower won one of the fifteen Cobouw Awards for the best project in the residential construction category.

=== Origin ===
The name New Babylon refers not only to the earlier building but also to the anti-capitalist visionary art project New Babylon, conceived and designed by visual artist Constant Nieuwenhuys (1920-2005) between 1959 and 1974, which has had a significant influence on architects. Constant, in turn, was inspired by the book Homo Ludens, in which author Johan Huizinga describes a future society in which all labor is fully automated, giving people an abundance of free time. Constant's New Babylon is a global vision of the future in which people are liberated from physical labor and can devote themselves entirely to creative work.

Many of the models, sculptures and two-dimensional artworks from Constant's New Babylon project are in the possession of the Kunstmuseum Den Haag and can be viewed there.

=== Ownership ===
New Babylon was originally a joint venture project between real estate developer Erik de Vlieger and ABN Amro Bouwfonds. Rotterdam real estate developer Fortress took over Vlieger's share, and Bouwfonds was acquired by SNS Reaal. In 2014, SNS Reaal's Property Finance became the full owner of the complex for €1.

New Babylon was the largest Dutch project in SNS Reaal's portfolio. In December 2015, Propertize, the new name for SNS Reaal's Property Finance, sold its stake to real estate investor Victory Advisors. In addition to the two office towers and the New Babylon shopping center, this investor also acquired the WKO installation that supplies heat and cold to New Babylon.

== Gallery ==
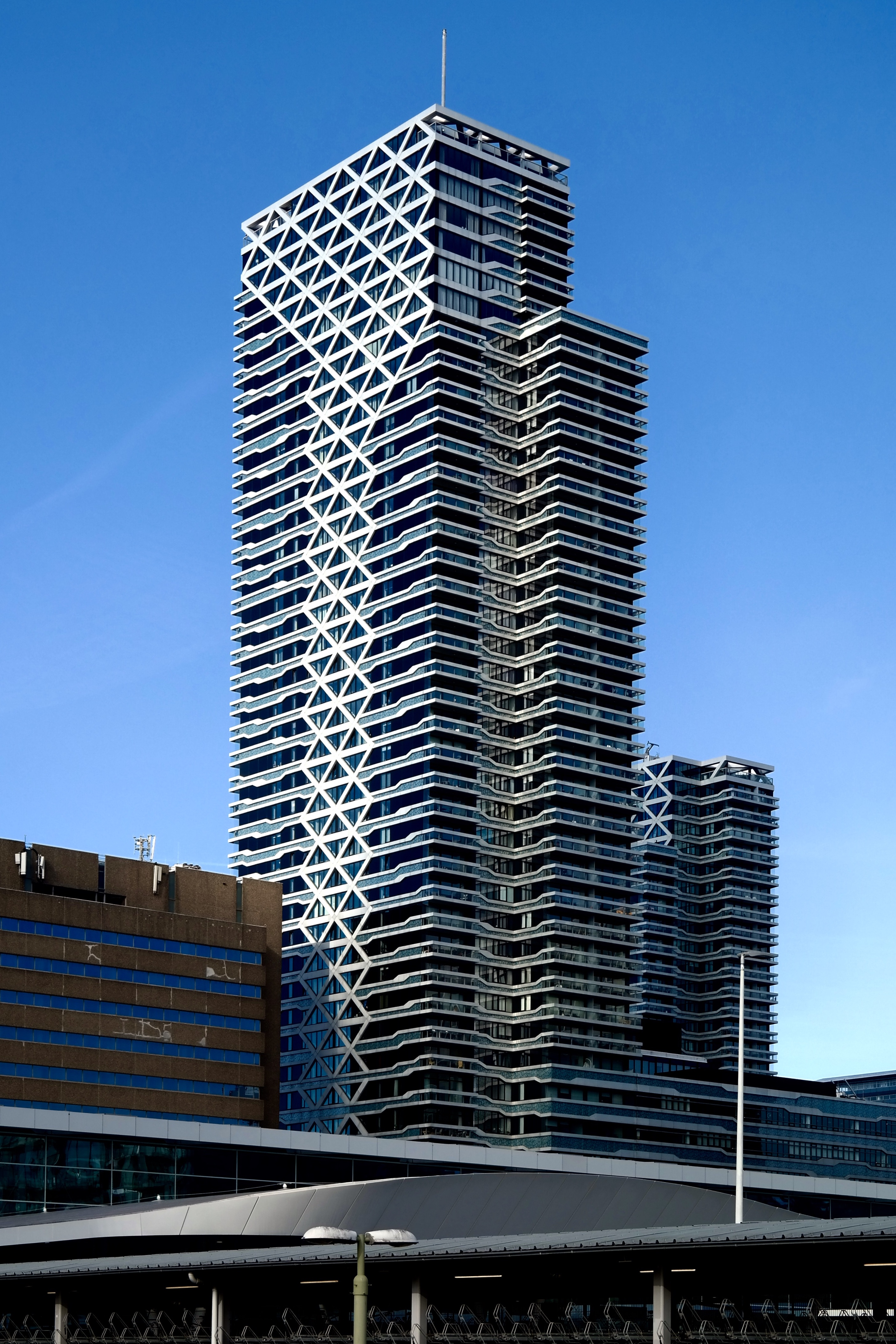
The City Tower

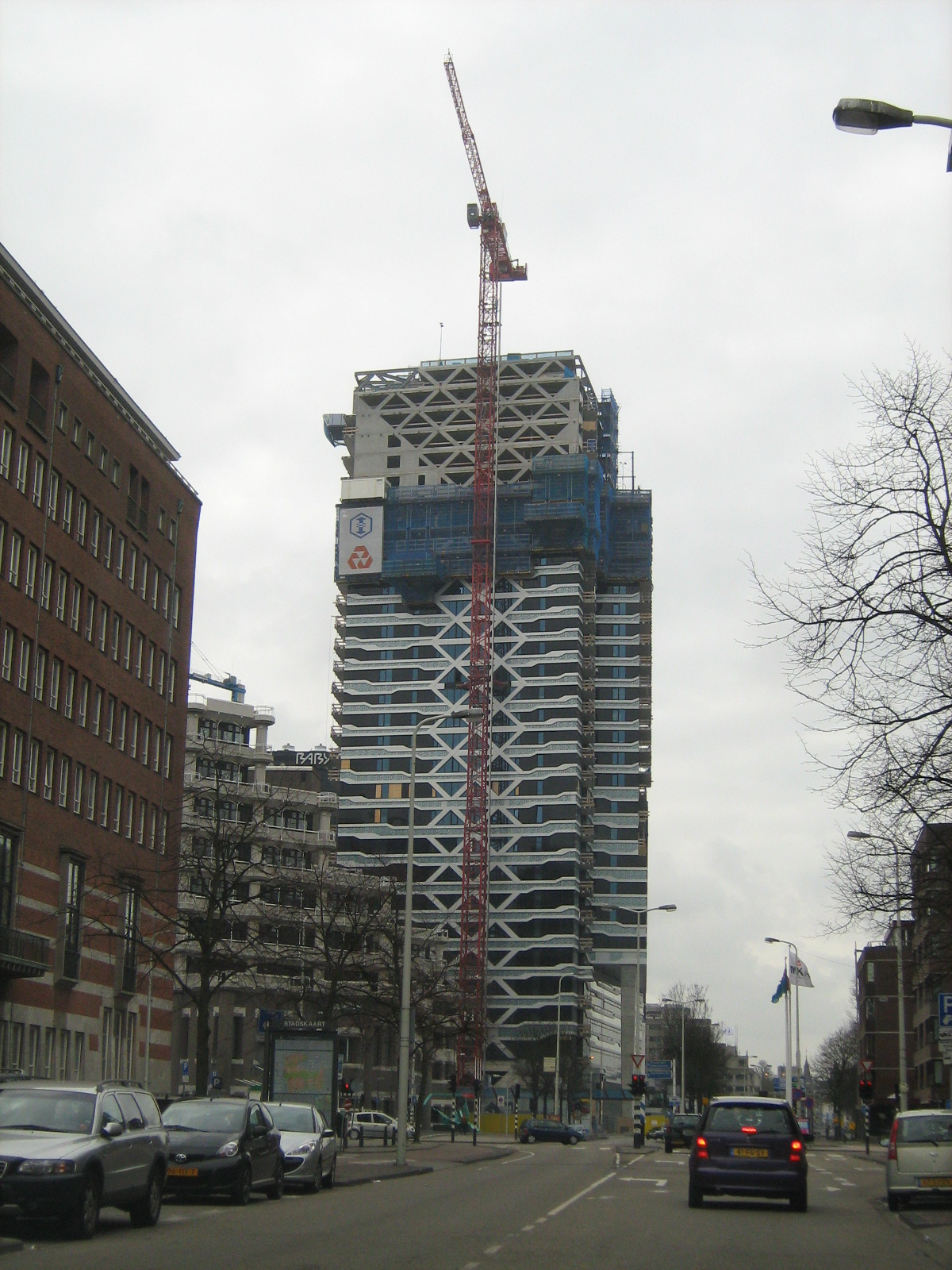
The Park Tower under construction in March 2010

== See also ==
- List of tallest buildings in the Netherlands
- List of tallest buildings in The Hague
