= JuBi Building =

Skyscraper in The Hague, Netherlands

- Rijkskantoor Turfmarkt (Dutch)
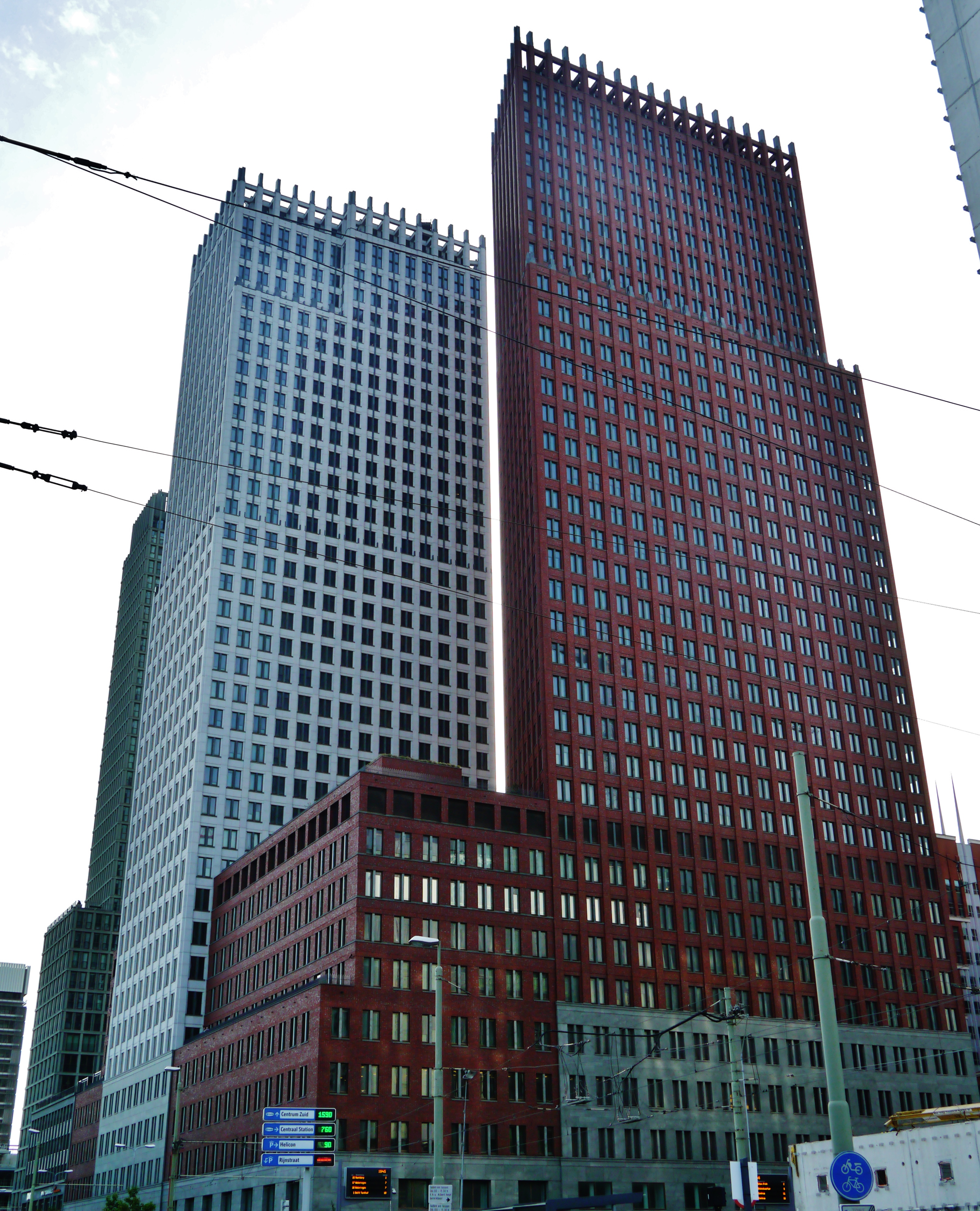
- Interactive map of the JuBi Building area

General information
- Status: Completed
- Type: Office
- Location: Turfmarkt 147, The Hague, Netherlands
- Coordinates: 52.079365°N 4.321924°E
- Construction started: 2008
- Completed: 2012
- Owner: National Real Estate Agency

Height
- Roof: 146 m (479 ft) (each)

Technical details
- Structural system: Reinforced concrete
- Floor count: 37 (each)
- Floor area: 132,000 m^{2} (1,420,000 sq ft)

Design and construction
- Architect: Hans Kollhoff
- Structural engineer: Zonneveld Ingenieurs B.V.

The JuBi Building (also known as the Turfmarkt Towers) is a high-rise office building complex in The Hague, Netherlands. Built between 2008 and 2012, the complex consists of two distinctive towers standing at 146 m (479 ft) tall with 37 floors each. They serve as the headquarters of the Ministry of Justice and Security and the Ministry of the Interior and Kingdom Relations.

== History ==
The complex was designed by Hans Kollhoff, who inspired its appearance by old skyscrapers in the United States. It was built for 330 million euros by the Royal BAM Group, Ballast Nedam, Homij and Royal Imtech N.V. companies on behalf of the Government Buildings Agency. Its complex was inaugurated in December 2012.

The complex consists of low-rise buildings and two 146-metre-high towers. The main entrance is located at an atrium between the two towers, from where they can both be seen: one red, the other white. The building has a floor area of 132,000 m^{2} (1,420,000 sq ft) and provides space for a total of 4,000 workstations. The management of the building is the responsibility of the group service provider within the central government, FMHaaglanden.

The complex—along with the De Kroon residential tower —replaced the De Zwarte Madonna residential building on The Hague's Turfmarkt Street, which was demolished in early 2008. The pedestrian route between the Den Haag Centraal railway station and the shopping district runs through Turfmarkt. The new building, along with De Resident, has been a significant development in the Wijnhavenkwartier district.

== Gallery ==
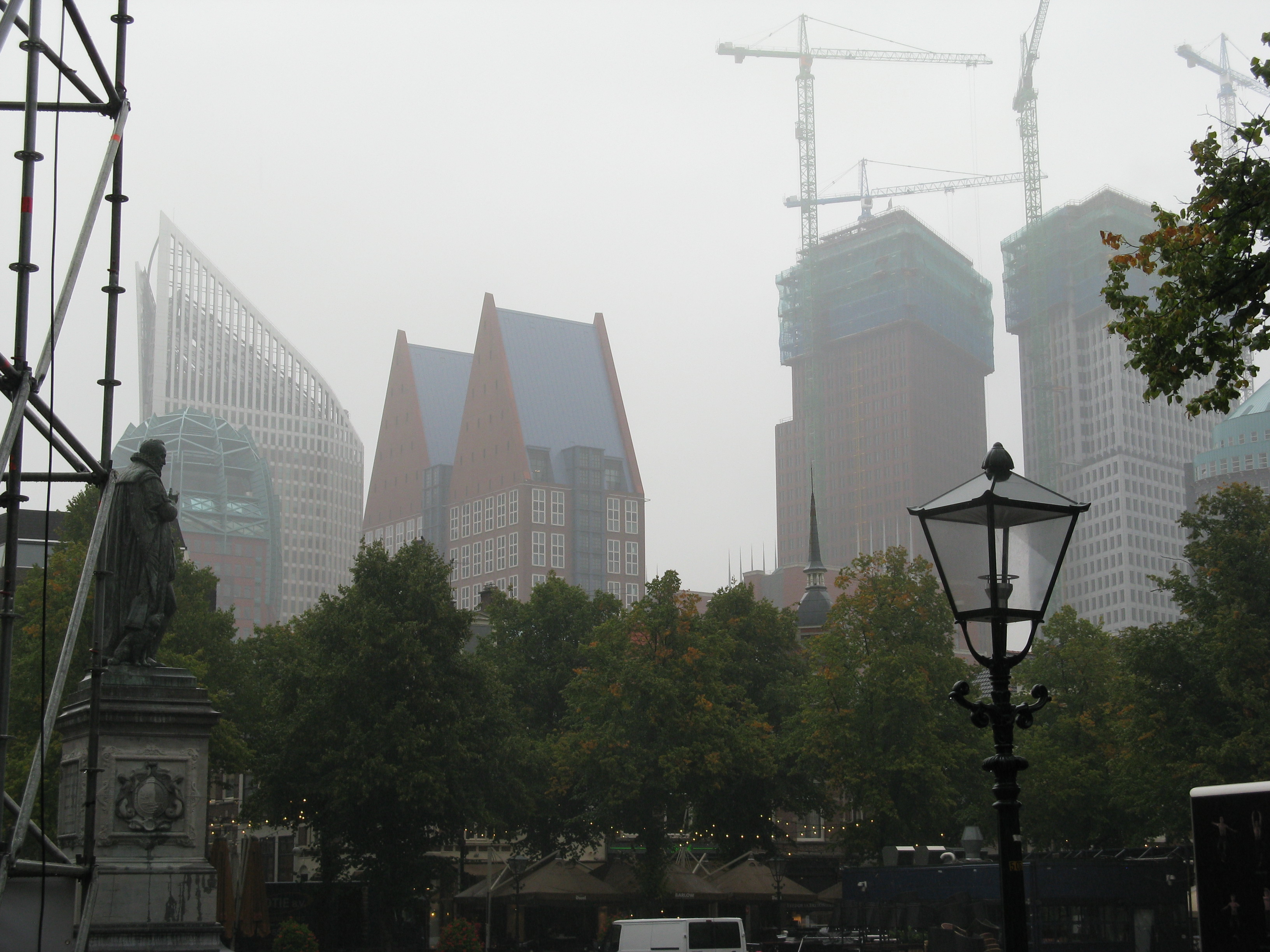
The towers under construction in 2011

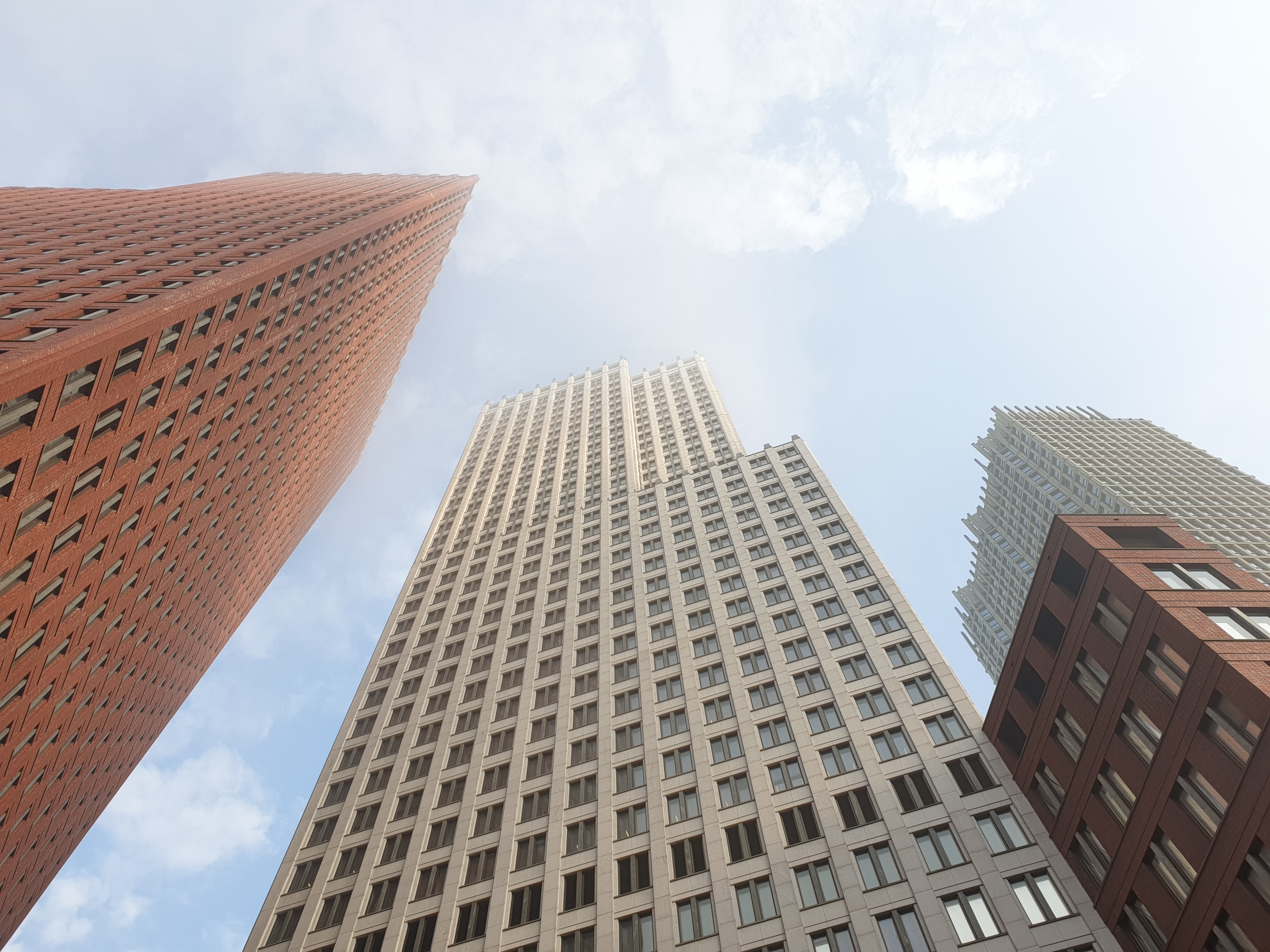
The towers in 2019

== See also ==
- List of tallest buildings in the Netherlands
- List of tallest buildings in The Hague
