= Carlton (Almere) =

Skyscraper in Almere, Netherlands

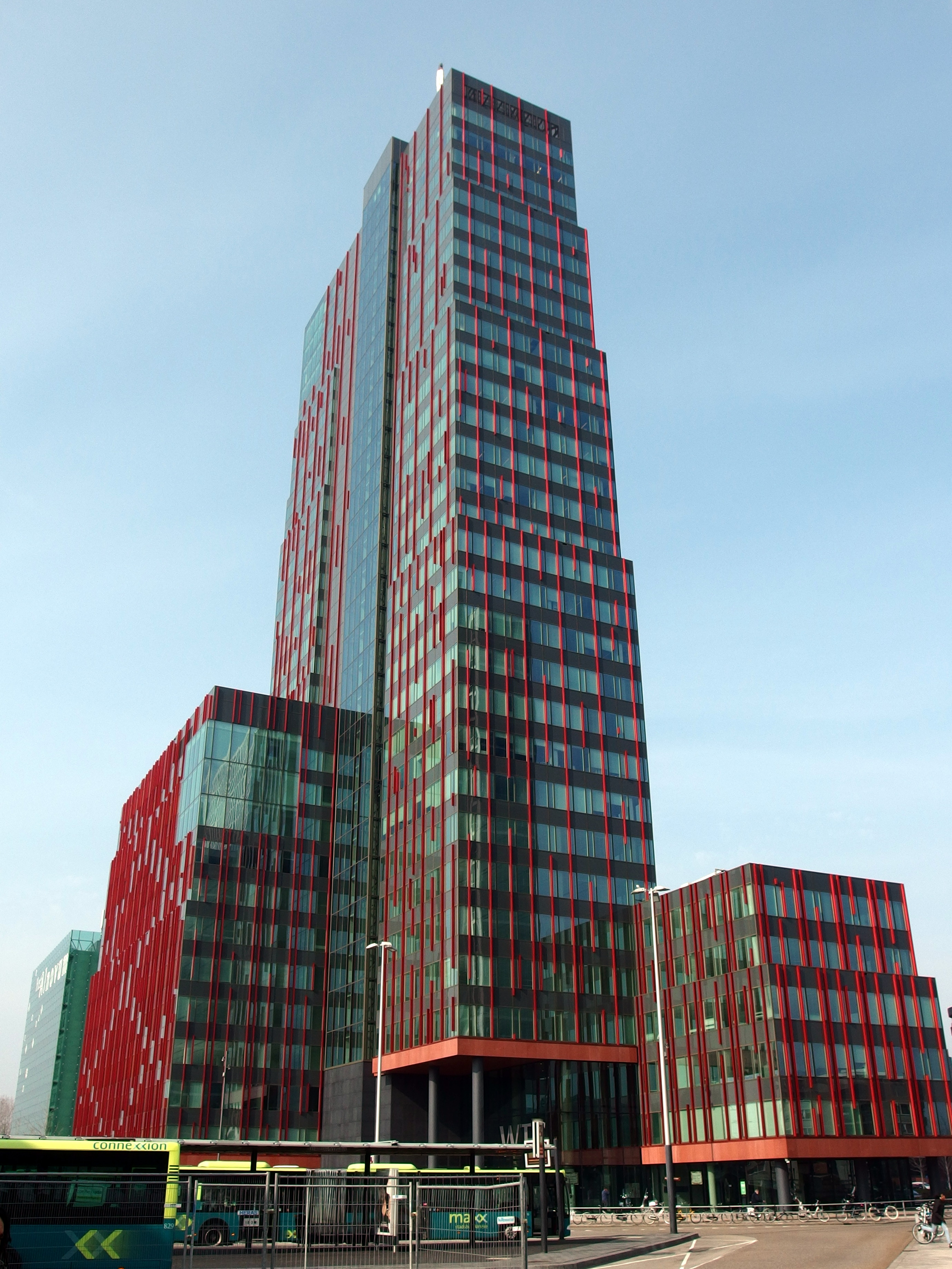
- Interactive map of the Carlton area

General information
- Status: Completed
- Type: Office
- Location: P.J. Oudweg 4, Almere, Netherlands
- Coordinates: 52.375492°N 5.21645°E
- Construction started: 2007
- Completed: 2010

Height
- Roof: 120 m (390 ft)

Technical details
- Structural system: Reinforced concrete
- Floor count: 32
- Floor area: 39,000 m^{2} (420,000 sq ft)

Design and construction
- Architects: Dam & Partners Architecten
- Developer: Eurocommerce

The Carlton Building is a high-rise office building in the Zuidelijk Flevoland polder of Almere, Netherlands. Built between 2007 and 2010, the tower stands at 120 m (390 ft) tall with 32 floors and is the 21st tallest building in the Netherlands.

== History ==
The building consists of three interconnected buildings with six, twelve, and 32 floors. At 120 meters tall and a total area of 39,000 m^{2} (420,000 sq ft), it is among the twenty tallest buildings in the Netherlands and the tallest building in the city of Almere. Including the antenna, the building is 141 meters tall.

The entire complex consists of a main central volume bordered by two lower figures and is supported by narrow columns creating a passage from the station to the park. The entrances to the two large atria are also situated in the same composition. The facades are dominated by vertical aluminium riflings placed in three different patterns, which become increasingly transparent towards to the top.

The Carlton is part of the L'Hermitage office complex, which is located on the north side of Almere Centrum station.

== See also ==
- List of tallest buildings in the Netherlands
