= Het Strijkijzer =

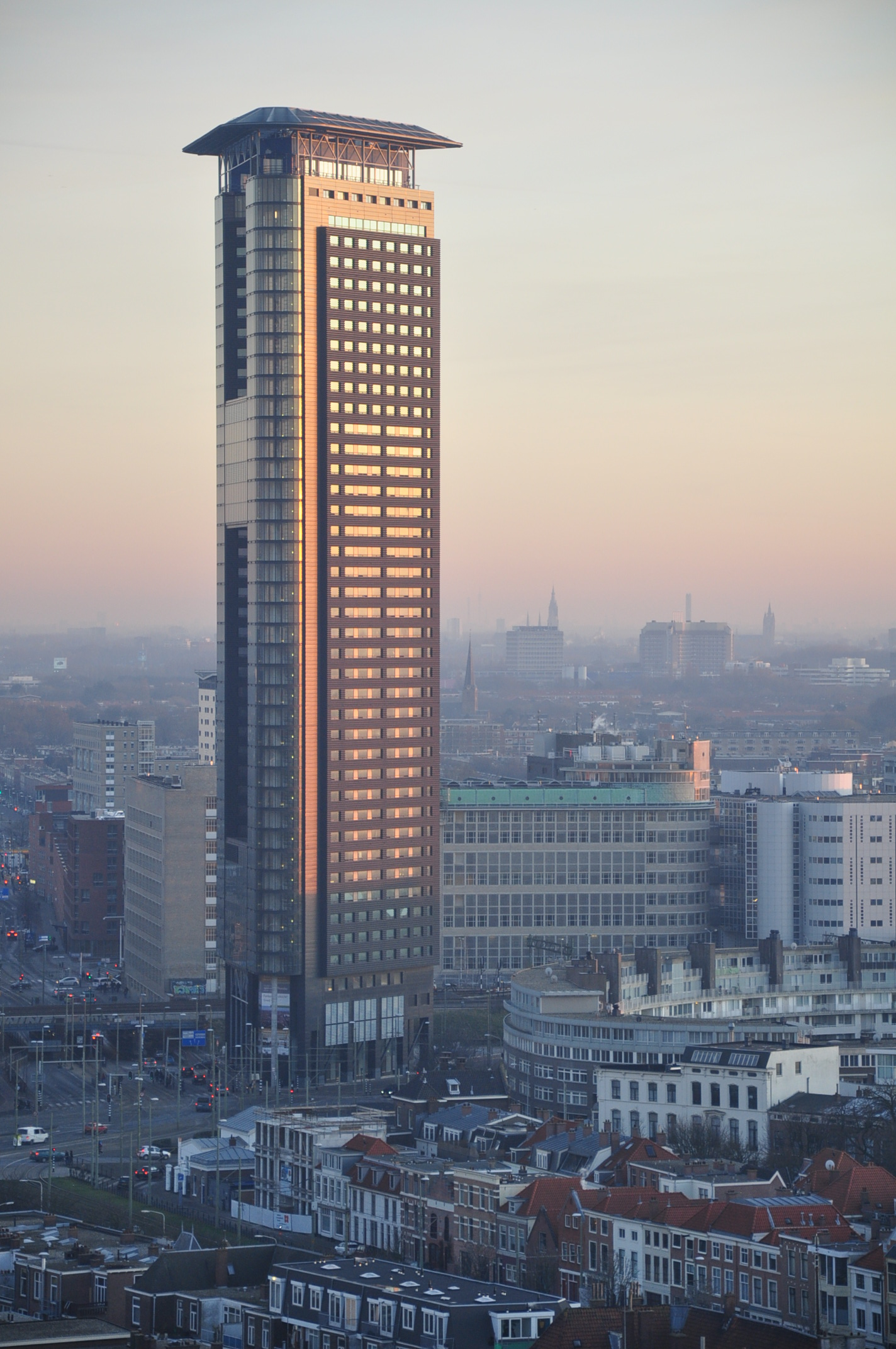
- Interactive map of the Het Strijkijzer area
- Alternative names: Haagse Toren

General information
- Status: Completed
- Type: Residential
- Architectural style: Modernism
- Location: Rijswijkseplein 400; The Hague, Netherlands
- Coordinates: 52.07138°N 4.3241°E
- Construction started: 2005
- Completed: 27 August 2007

Height
- Roof: 132 m (433 ft)

Technical details
- Floor count: 43
- Floor area: 30,450 m^{2} (327,800 sq ft)
- Lifts/elevators: 5

Design and construction
- Architects: AAArchitecten; Westo Prefab Betonsystemen
- Engineer: Deerns Raadgevende Ingenieurs; Corsmit Raadgevende Ingenieurs
- Main contractor: Aannemersbedrijf v/h Boele & Van Eesteren

Other information
- Number of units: 351

Het Strijkijzer (Dutch pronunciation: [ˈstrɛikɛizər], The Flatiron) is a residential and office skyscraper in The Hague, Netherlands. It is 132 metres (433 ft) with 43 floors, making it the city's fourth tallest building. In 2007 the building was awarded the Hague New City Prize and the international Emporis Skyscraper Award, with Emporis citing "its elegant reinterpretation of classic high-rise architecture, its contextual approach to a limited site, and its efficient program for accommodating new entrants to the housing market". Inspired by the Flatiron Building in New York City, its name is the Dutch word for an iron.

The building contains 300 studio flats for students and first-time property owners, and 51 luxury flats, accessible by a separate lift. There are also furnished flats for rental on a weekly or monthly basis. Below is space for catering, a laundromat, ironing facilities and office space. Since 2011, there is a panoramic terrace on the 42nd floor, which is accessible from the ground floor via a dedicated lift. From the terrace, one can see the ships on the North Sea.

== Construction ==
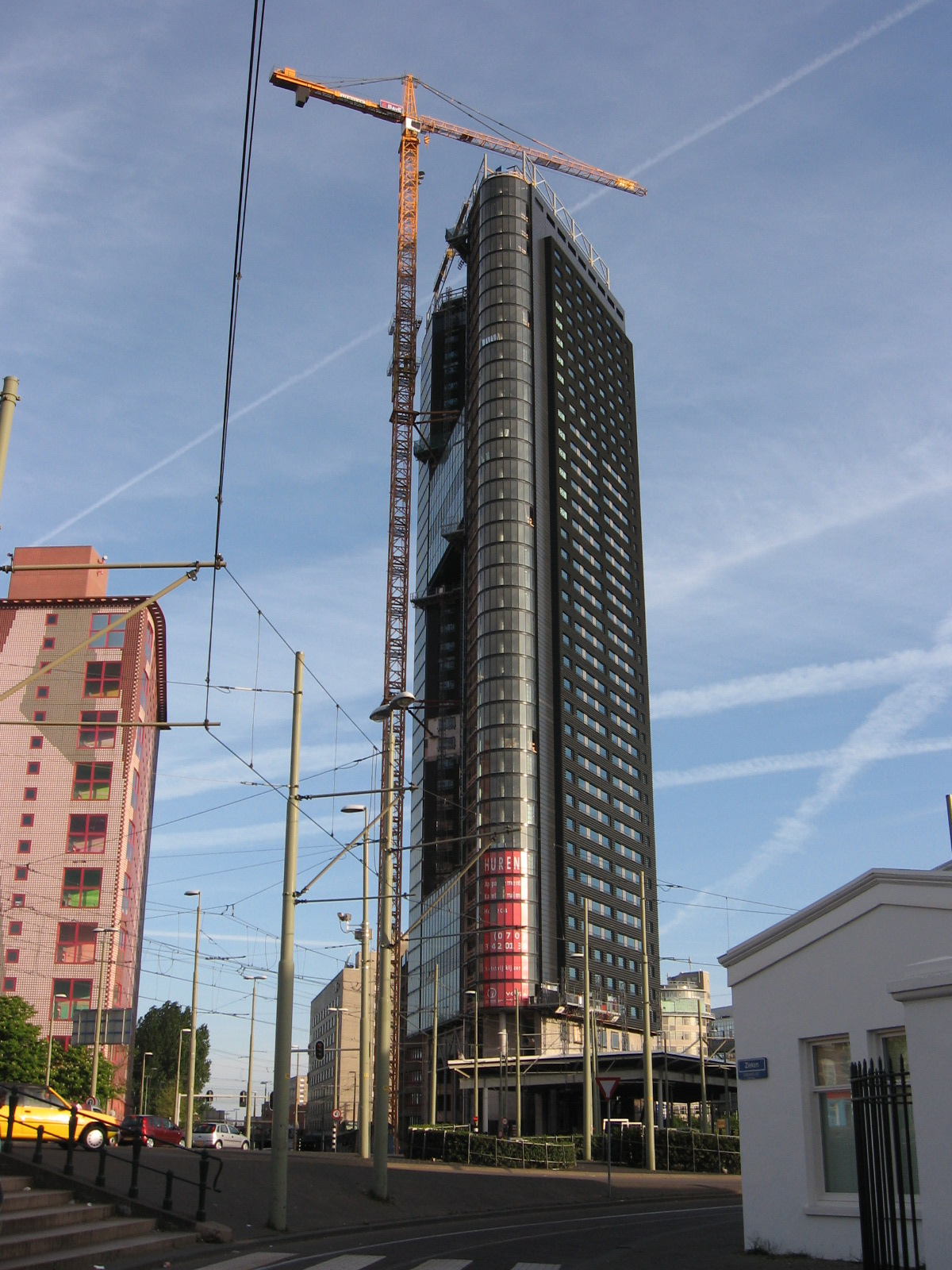
Het Strijkijzer nearing completion in April 2007.

Construction of Het Strijkijzer started in 2005. The construction site was a piece of land, measuring only 30 by 35 m (98 by 115 ft), on the edge of the Rijswijkseplein, an important infrastructural crossroad of The Hague, surrounded by heavy car and tram traffic. The contractor, Boele & van Eesteren, thus had to pay close attention to the safety aspect and to the minimising of noise and other nuisance. The lower floors were made of concrete poured on-site and the upper floors were completely constructed with precast concrete. Construction progressed with an average of two floors per week.

Het Strijkijzer was topped off in March 2007. In June 2007 the building was capped with a crown which was mentioned in the local news shortly after installation because in high winds it emitted a high-pitched whistling sound. Hoftoren and Prinsenhof Tower in The Hague have also had such problems because of the nature of their tops. In the short term, the problem has been alleviated by affixing 380 plywood sheets to the crown. A visually more pleasing, permanent solution was implemented in early 2010 by replacing the plywood with 454 transparent lexan panels.

Het Strijkijzer is a project of Vestia, a Dutch residential corporation which is working together with De Compaan to employ mentally handicapped people in various capacities in laundry, ironing and catering.

== Design ==
The ground plan of Het Strijkijzer has an L-shape, with the slightly longer wing pointing north, and the shorter wing pointing east, the corner between them pointing south-west, in the direction of the Hollands Spoor railway station. The corners of the triangle are rounded, and each has its own lobby, pair of lifts, and staircase. The southern entrance, at the end of the longer wing, is for the residents of the studio flats. The western entrance, at the end of the shorter wing, is for the residents of the luxury flats, and the third entrance is for visitors of the panoramic terrace; the lifts go straight from the lobby to the 42nd floor.

Both at the base of the building and at six floors higher up, the two wings are connected, creating a full triangle. On the small north-eastern side of these six floors, a display was attached in 2011. Measuring 19x14 metres (62x46 feet), this LED display features Twitter messages, photos of local events, advertisements and, regularly, the time.

- Floors 42-43: Panoramic terrace
- Floors 32-40: four luxury flats per floor; two in the longer wing, one in the corner and one in the shorter wing
- Floors 5-29: twelve studio flats per floor; seven in the longer wing, one in the corner and four in the shorter wing

== Innovative ideas ==
Since there was no room for 351 mailboxes, a kind of paternoster system was designed for mail in consultation with the nation postal service TNT Post; in the lobby of the building, a resident can have his or her box appear by keying in a code. Residents also receive a keycard which gives them access to their apartment and storage.

== Gallery ==
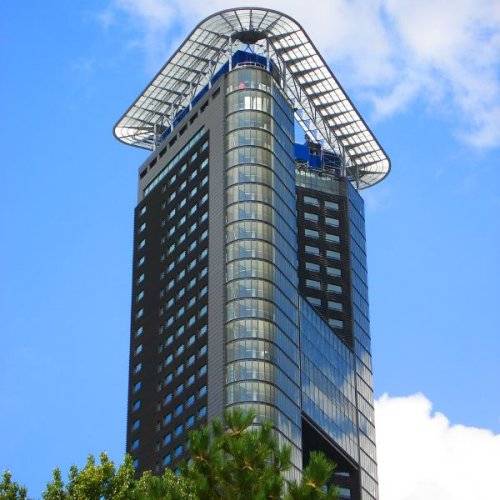
Het Strijkijzer.

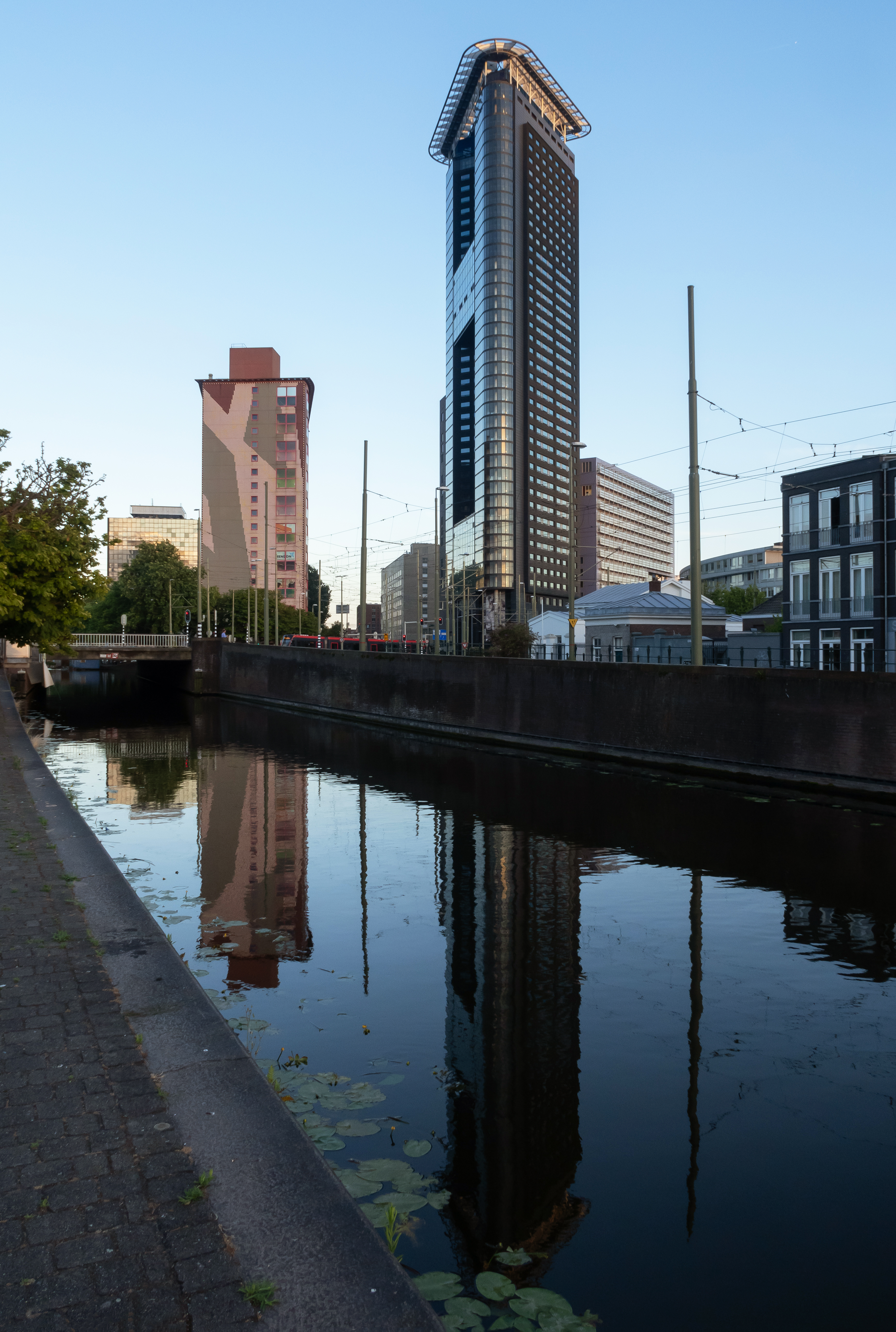
Het Strijkijzer just before sunset

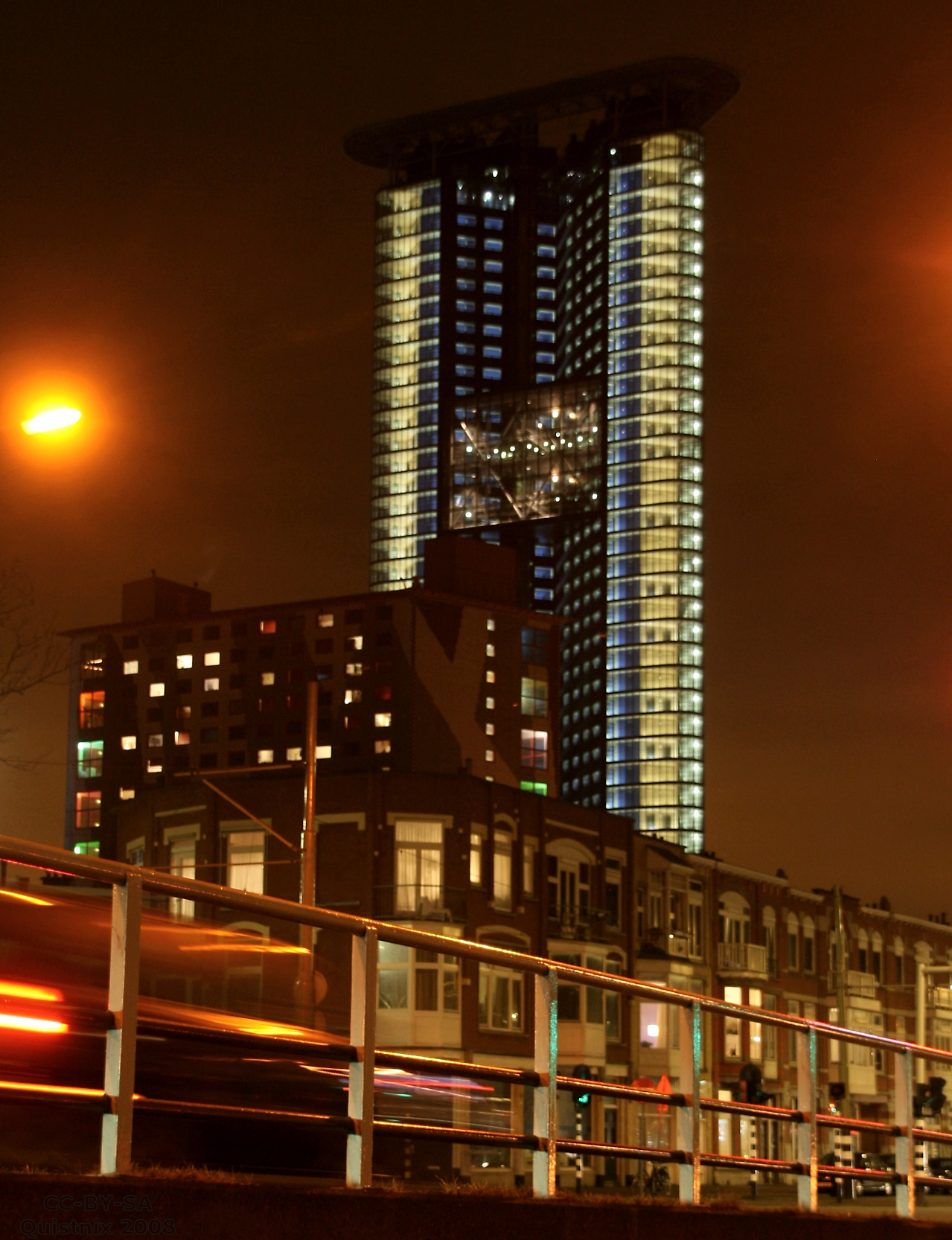
Het Strijkijzer by night.

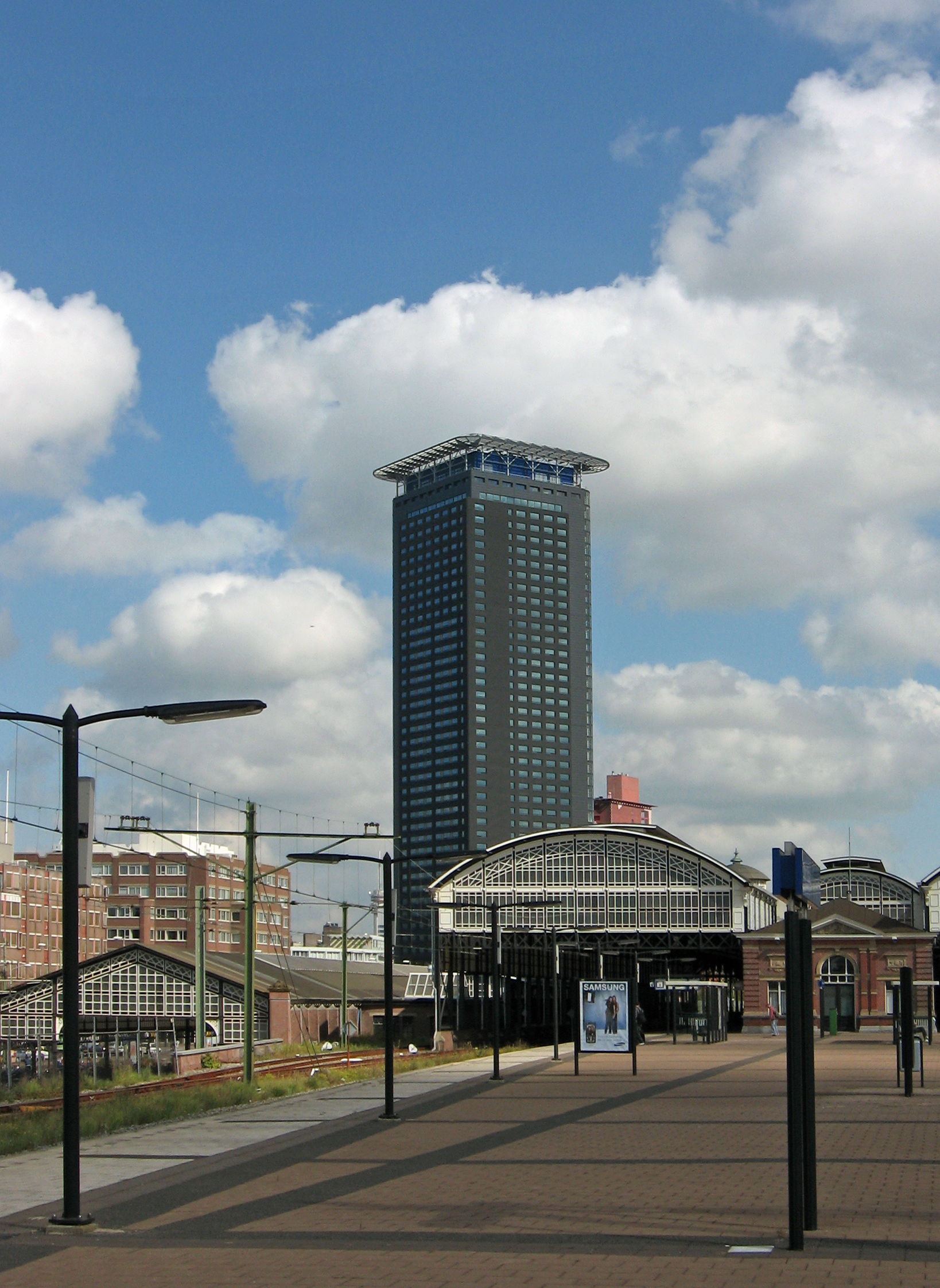
Het Strijkijzer as seen from Hollands Spoor railway station.

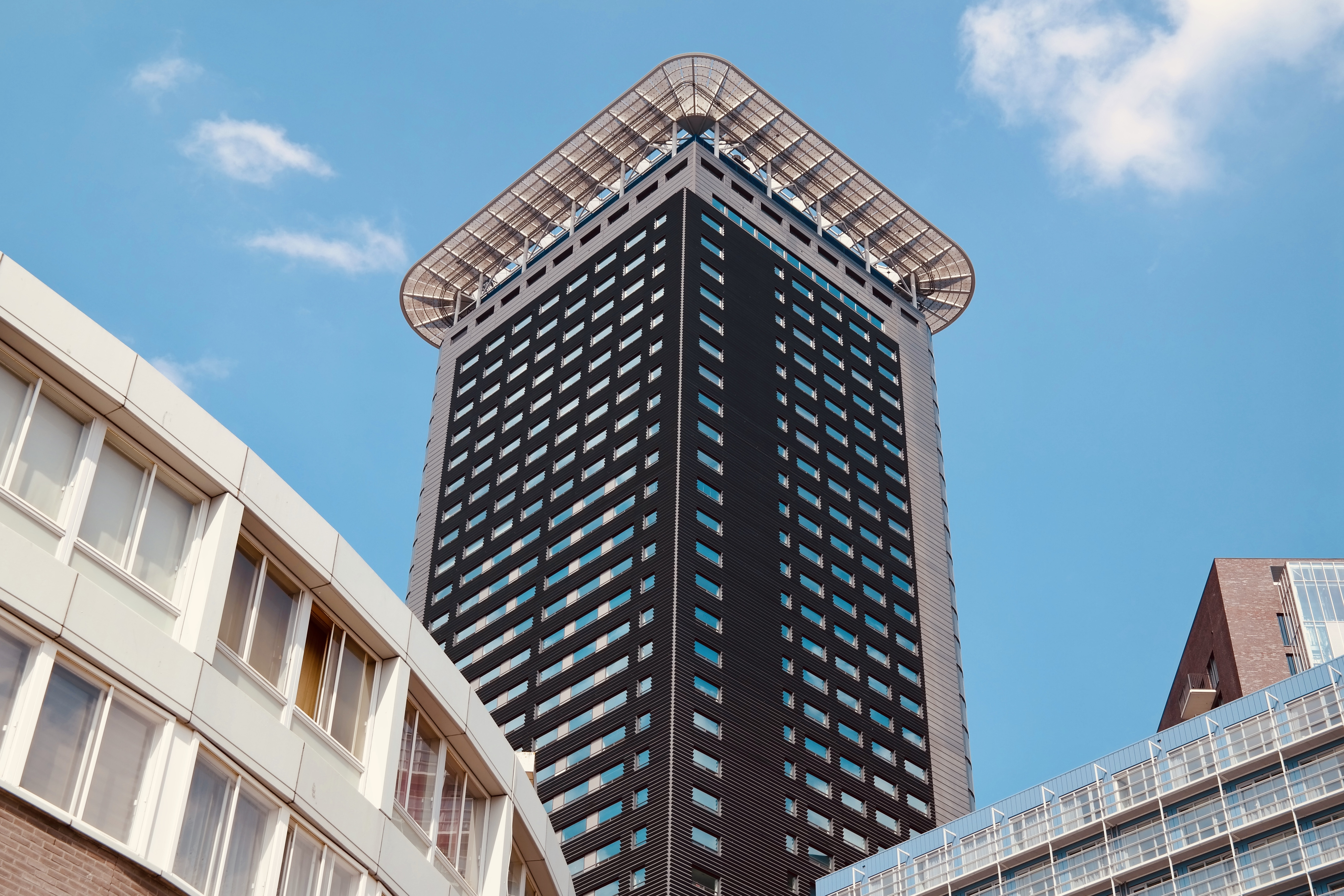
Het Strijkijzer as seen from Stationsplein The Hague

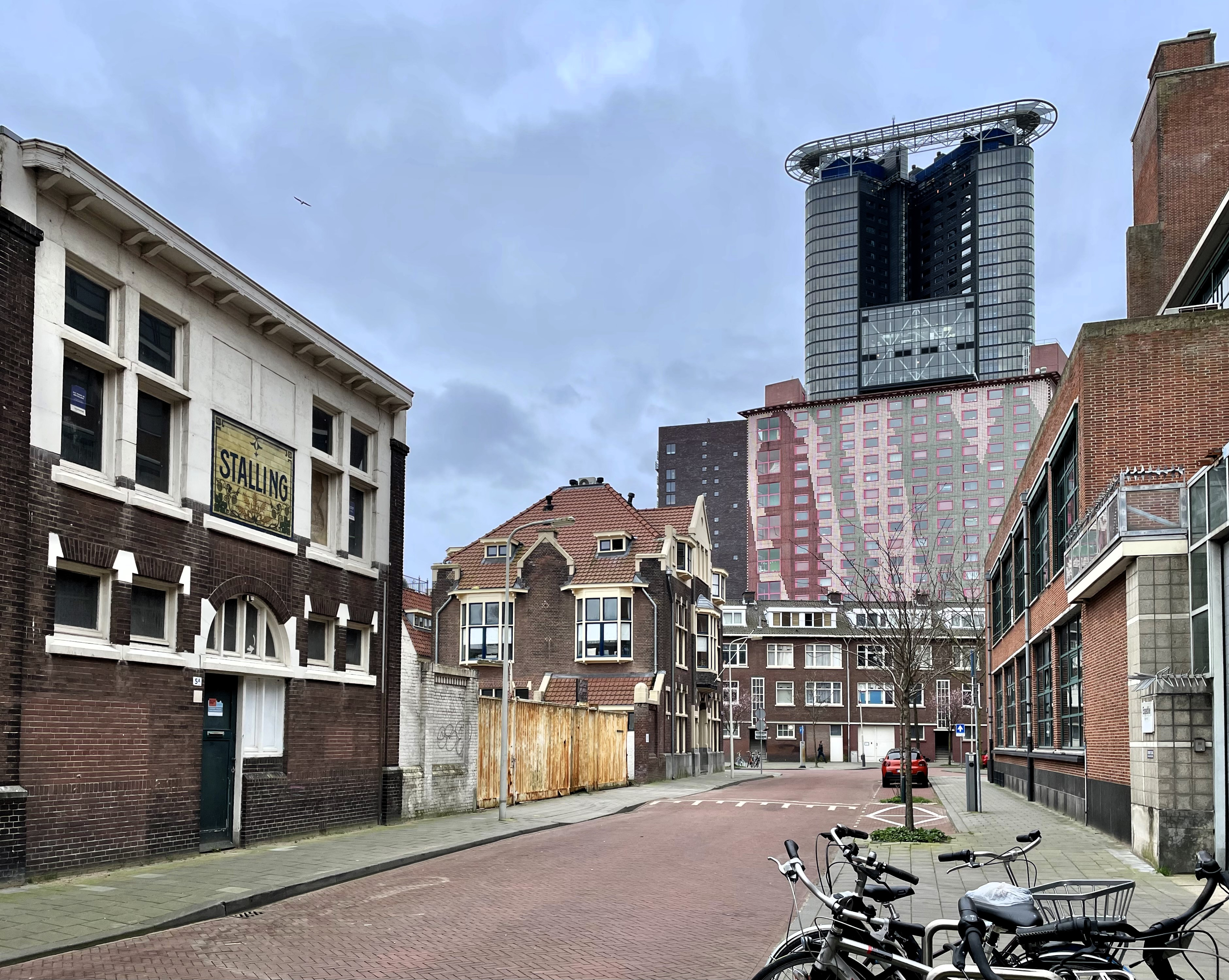
As seen from a residential street
