= Cobouw =

Cobouw is an independent Dutch publication for the construction industry with a website, app, and a newspaper that is published twice a week in a print run of 4700 copies and 20,000 readers. The website has an average of 275,000 users per month. Cobouw focuses primarily on decision-makers in construction and the management of (medium-sized) construction companies. In addition, the content is viewed and read by developers, suppliers, clients (municipalities, provinces, national government), and consultants.

The editorial office of Cobouw and other Vakmedianet publications is located in Zeist.

== History ==
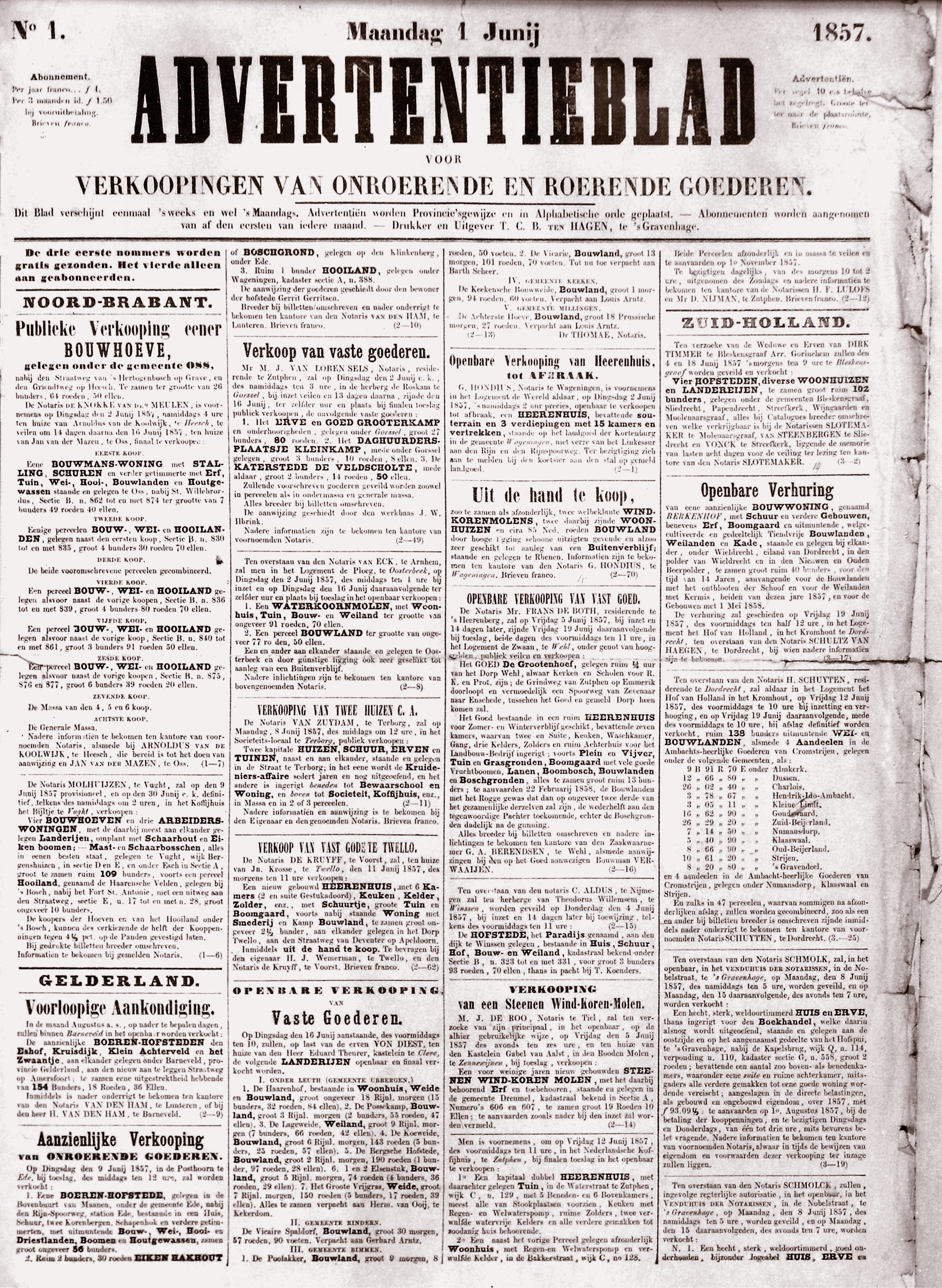
First edition of the Advertentieblad voor verkoopingen van roerende en onroerende goederen

=== 19th century ===
From June 1, 1857, the forerunner of Cobouw was published by T.C.B. ten Hagen under the name Advertentieblad voor verkoopingen van roerende en onroerende goederen (Dutch for "Advertising sheet for sales of movable and immovable property). The magazine consisted of four pages and was published every Monday. The subscription price was four guilders per year. Initially, no editorial content included, just advertisements.

In May 1874, under the heading "Countrymen", a call appeared to give money to a victim of an accident at work. In this accident, 27-year-old Corneelis Vermeere lost both hands and one leg. At that time, little attention was paid to safety in construction and victims could not claim anything. This call drew attention to a major societal problem. It is unclear what became of the victim. From 1883 onwards, the first editorial contributions appeared in the paper, then named Algemeen Nederlandsch Advertentieblad.

=== 20th century ===
Gradually more editorial articles appeared, including the plans to dry up the Zuiderzee. As contractors became increasingly interested in the magazine, a separate appendix appeared from 1912, the "Bouwkundig Bijblad" (Dutch for Construction Supplement). In 1915, the Algemeen Nederlandsch Advertentieblad was changed to the Centraal Orgaan voor Handel en Industrie, in short Covhei.

In 1932 it was decided to focus the magazine, now appearing twice a week, entirely on construction. Accordingly, the magazine was renamed: Centraal Orgaan voor de Bouwwereld, or Cobouw in short. From 1961, Cobouw appeared daily.

Over the years, Cobouw has paid a lot of attention to construction projects throughout the Netherlands. Examples are the Afsluitdijk in 1927, the construction of the metro network for the Rotterdam metro in 1960, the construction of the Coentunnel in 1961, the construction of Almere as a suburb for Amsterdam, and construction fraud. Cobouw did not shy away from controversy. For example, in 1961, it advocated stricter supervision of construction and cracked down on fraudulent contractors.

=== 21st century ===
In 2004 Sdu acquired Cobouw from Wolters-Kluwer. In 2013, Cobouw and several other trade magazines were moved to the independent Sdu subsidiary BIM Media B.V. In 2016, BIM Media was sold to publisher Vakmedianet. Earlier that year, Cobouw had become a weekly magazine again, in combination with daily online messages for subscribers.

Since June 2017, Cobouw has been published in tabloid format twice a week. Also, the editorial staff has been working according to the online first principle since 2017. Articles are initially created for the site and from here two newspapers are published per week. Eric Verweij became editor-in-chief of Cobouw in October 2019.
