= Ministry of the Interior and Kingdom Relations =

Government ministry of the Netherlands

- Ministerie van Binnenlandse Zaken en Koninkrijksrelaties
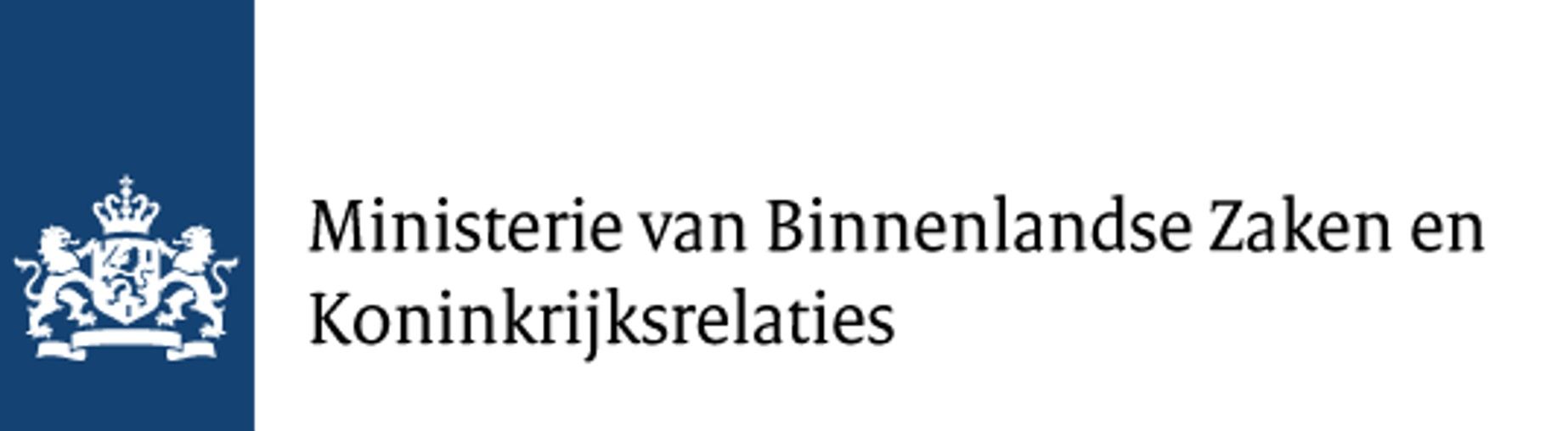

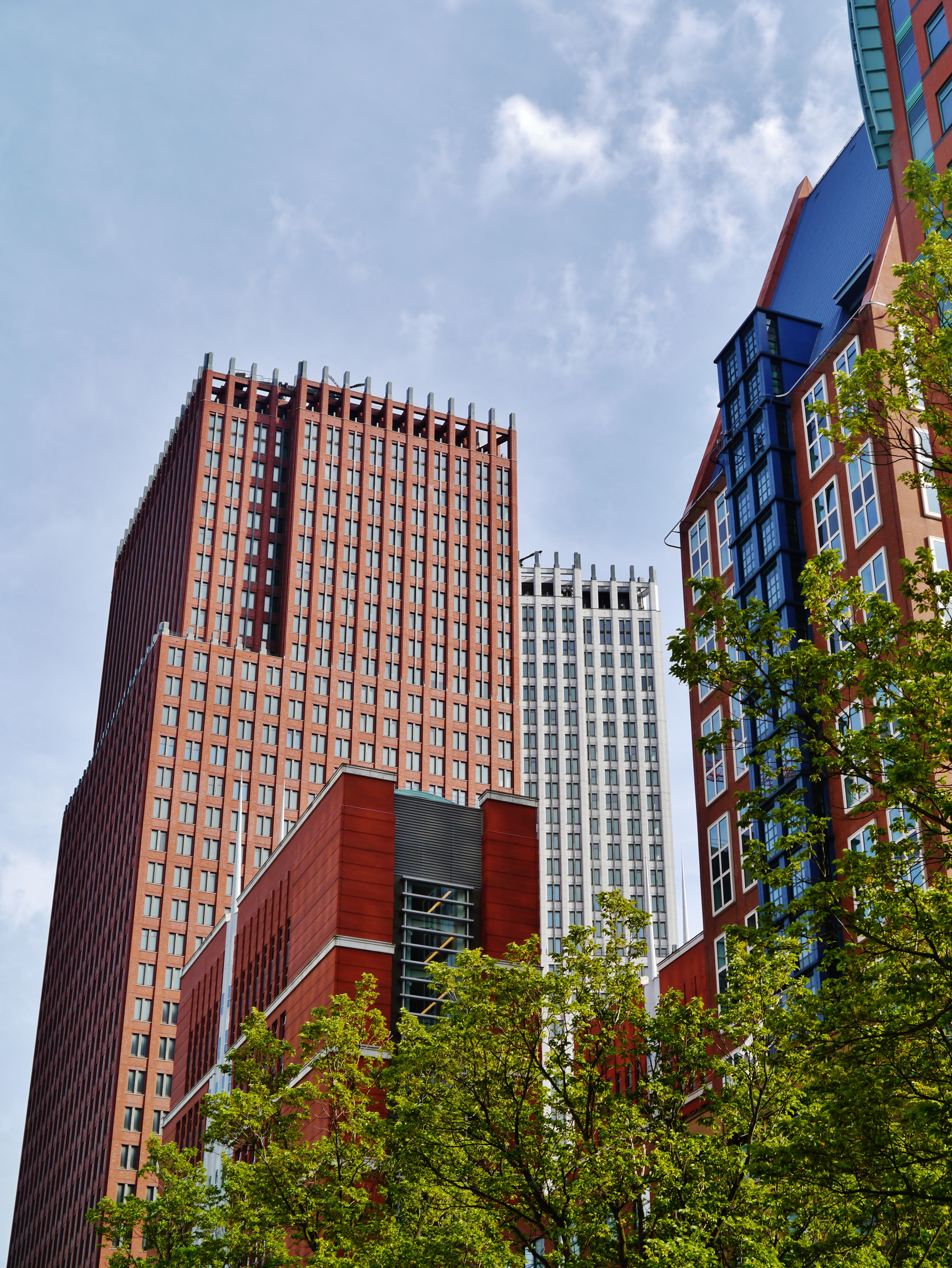
- Current headquarters, the JuBi Building complex

Ministry overview
- Formed: 12 March 1798; 228 years ago
- Jurisdiction: Kingdom of the Netherlands
- Headquarters: Turfmarkt 147, The Hague
- Employees: 3,000
- Annual budget: €UR3.8 billion (2018)
- Minister responsible: Pieter Heerma, Minister of the Interior and Kingdom Relations
- Deputy Ministers responsible: Eric van der Burg, State Secretary for Kingdom Relations and Effective Government; Elanor Boekholt-O'Sullivan, Minister of Housing and Spatial Planning
- Ministry executive: Vincent Roozen, Secretary-General
- Website: Ministry of the Interior and Kingdom Relations

The Ministry of the Interior and Kingdom Relations (Dutch: Ministerie van Binnenlandse Zaken en Koninkrijksrelaties; BZK) is the Netherlands' ministry responsible for domestic policy, civil service, public administration, elections, relations with local governments, intelligence, and kingdom relations.

The minister of the interior and kingdom relations is a member of the Cabinet of the Netherlands. The ministry was created in 1798 as the Department of Internal Police, to monitor the state of dikes, roads, and waters of the Batavian Republic. It became the Ministry of the Interior in 1876 and had several name changes before adopting its current name in 1998.

== History ==
A precursor of the ministry, the Department for Internal Policy and Supervision on the State of Water Works, was founded in the Batavian Republic in 1798. This department was renamed Ministry of the Interior in 1801, and this name carried through when the Netherlands regained its independence in 1813. Its initial scope included such diverse policy areas as education, commerce, public health and telegraphy.

As the role of the government expanded with the advent of the welfare state in the late 19th and early 20th century, several of these policy areas were transferred to other ministries or given their own ministry. This started in 1877, when the Ministry of Water Management, Commerce and Industry was established. This development continued in the 20th century. In 1918, public housing was transferred to the Ministry of Labour, and a Ministry of Education, Arts and Science was established. The ministry was briefly renamed Ministry of the Interior and Agriculture in 1923, but agriculture was transferred to the Ministry of Economic Affairs in 1932.

More recently, the ministry has gained certain competences. In 1998, the responsibilities previously falling under the Cabinet for Netherlands Antillean and Aruban Affairs, a remnant of the Ministry of Colonial Affairs, were given to the ministry, which was renamed Ministry of the Interior and Kingdom Relations, referring to the relations between the different constituent countries within the Kingdom of the Netherlands. From 2003 to 2010, future prime minister of the Netherlands Dick Schoof was director-general for public order and safety at the Ministry of the Interior and Kingdom Relations. In that position, he was in charge of restructuring the police force from a number of regional organisations into a single National Police Corps.

In 2010, security policy, including police and fire services, were transferred to the newly created Ministry of Security and Justice, while the Ministry of the Interior and Kingdom Relations regained public housing in return. Responsibilities over housing and spatial planning were spun off in July 2024 into a separate ministry.

== Responsibilities ==
The ministry is called the "Mother of all Ministries" because most ministries, like the former Ministry of Agriculture, Nature and Food Quality and Ministry of Education, Culture and Science split from the ministry at one time or another. It is also called the "residual ministry", because it is left with a diverse set of responsibilities after these splits. The ministry concerns itself with the following issues:

- Democracy and the rule of law
- Public administration
- The quality of personnel and management within central government
- The Dutch constitution and the system of constitutional government
- The partnership with Curaçao, Sint Maarten and Aruba

Because it shares so many responsibilities, and has twin buildings (both old and new) with the Ministry of Justice and Security, they are sometimes called the twin ministries.

== Organisation ==
The Ministry has currently three Government Agencies and two Directorates:

Government Agencies			Responsibilities
	General Intelligence and Security Service (Dutch: Algemene Inlichtingen- en Veiligheidsdienst)	AIVD	Intelligence agency • Secret service
	Safety Board (Dutch: Onderzoeksraad Voor Veiligheid)	OVV	Accidents and Incidents Investigation
Government Real Estate Agency	Government Real Estate Agency (Dutch: Rijksvastgoedbedrijf)	RVB	Real estate

- Directorate for Public Administration (DGOO)
- Directorate for Management and Personnel Policy (BW)
- Directorate for Constitutional Affairs and Kingdom Relations (CKR)

== See also ==
- List of ministers of the interior of the Netherlands
- List of ministers of kingdom relations of the Netherlands
