= De Kroon (The Hague) =

Coordinates: 52.0790°N 4.3214°E

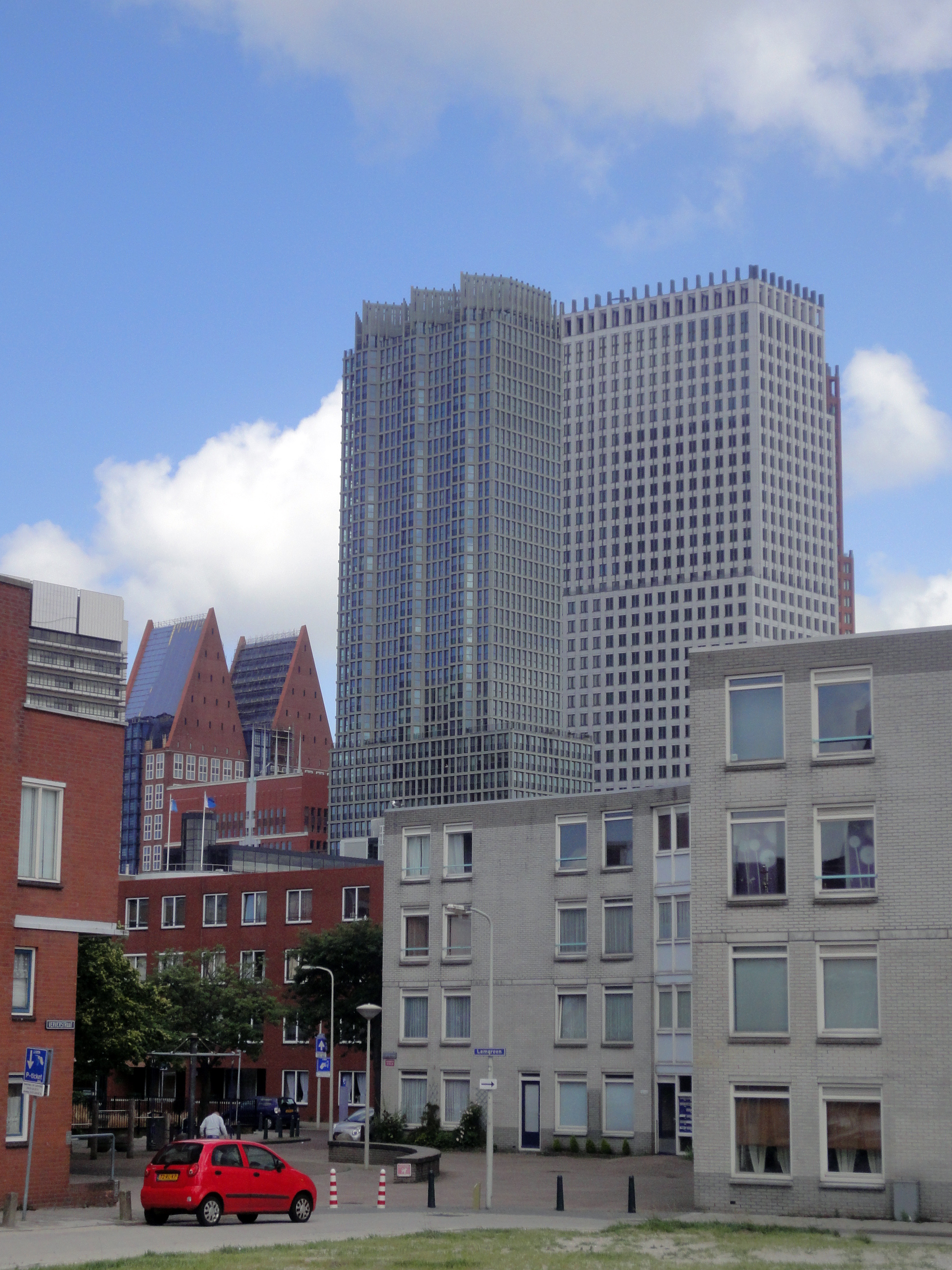
- Interactive map of the De Kroon area

General information
- Status: Completed
- Type: Residential
- Location: Turfmarkt; The Hague, Netherlands
- Construction started: 2008
- Completed: 2011
- Cost: €65 million
- Owner: Haag Wonen

Height
- Roof: 131.5 m (431 ft)

Technical details
- Floor count: 41

Design and construction
- Architect: Rapp+Rapp
- Developer: MAB Development BV

De Kroon (English: The Crown) is a residential and office skyscraper in the Center of The Hague, Netherlands. It is 131.5 metres (431 ft) tall and contains 41 floors, making it the sixth tallest building in the city. It contains 6 floor of office space combined with 13 floors of public housing, and 27 floors of houses for sale. Construction of De Kroon started in 2008 and ended in 2011. It was designed by architectural firm Rapp + Rapp and built by MAB Development BV.
