= Hoftoren =

Building in The Hague, Netherlands

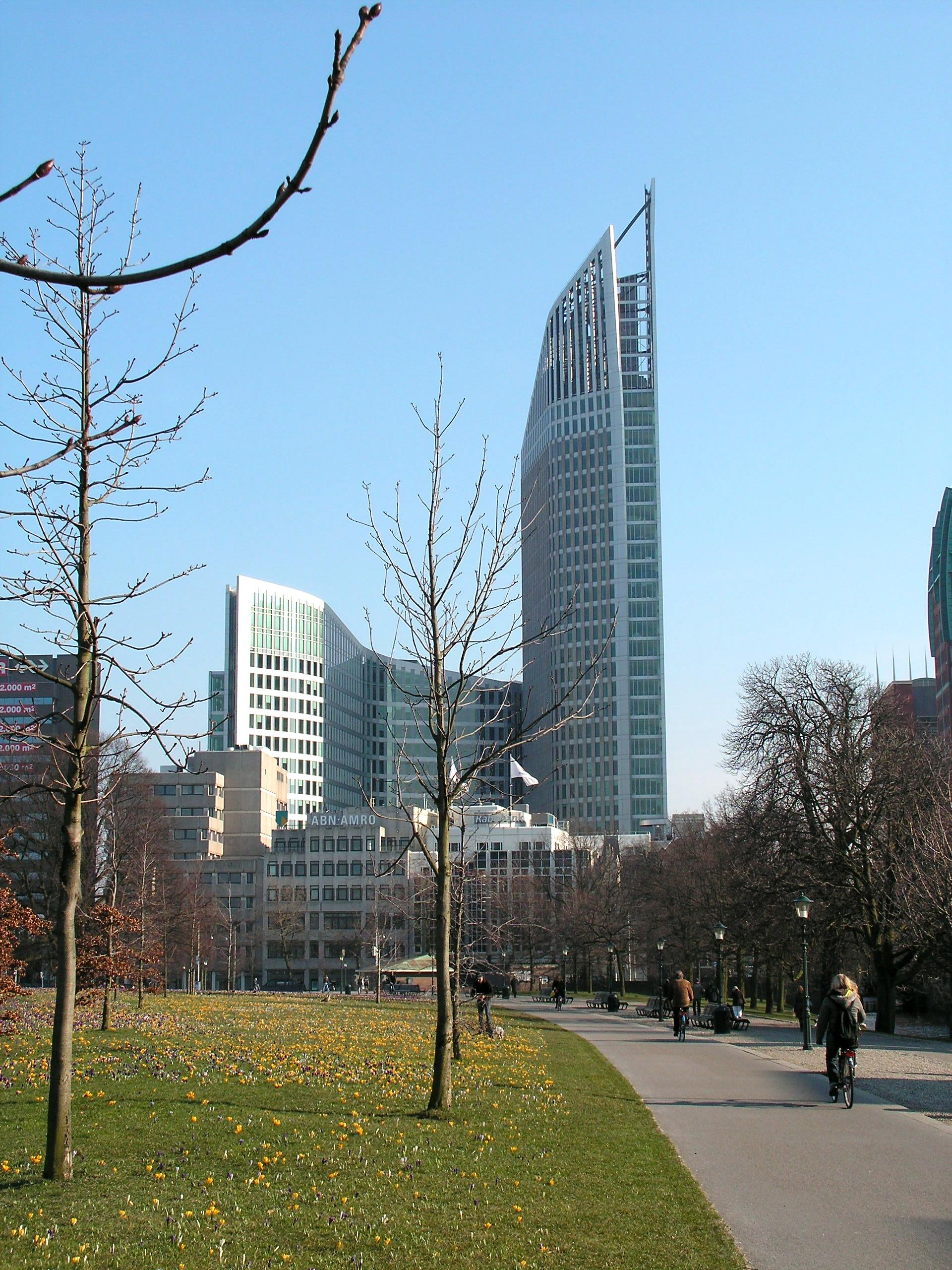
- Interactive map of the Hoftoren area
- Alternative names: De Vulpen

General information
- Status: Completed
- Type: Government offices
- Architectural style: Modernism
- Location: Rijnstraat 50; The Hague, Netherlands
- Coordinates: 52.0805°N 4.3217°E
- Completed: 1999 - 2003

Height
- Roof: 141.86 m (465.4 ft)
- Top floor: 107 m (351 ft)

Technical details
- Floor count: 30; 2 below ground
- Floor area: 48,000 m^{2} (520,000 sq ft)

Design and construction
- Architect: Kohn Pedersen Fox Associates
- Structural engineer: Deerns Raadgevende Ingenieurs; Scheldebouw
- Main contractor: Ministerie van Onderwijs, Cultuur en Wetenschap
- Awards and prizes: International Highrise Award; 2004

The Hoftoren (Dutch pronunciation: [ˈɦɔftoːrə(n)]; "Court Tower"), nicknamed De Vulpen (pronounced [də ˈvʏlpɛn]; "The Fountain Pen"), is a 29-storey, 141.86-metre-high (465.4 ft) building in The Hague, Netherlands. It is the third-tallest building in the city, and the eighth-tallest in the country. The Hoftoren was designed by Kohn Pedersen Fox Associates (KPF) in New York City, and built by Heijmans Bouw BV, and is home to the Ministry of Education, Culture and Science and the Ministry of Health, Welfare and Sport (the latter having taken up temporary residence in the Hoftoren in 2012) of the Netherlands.

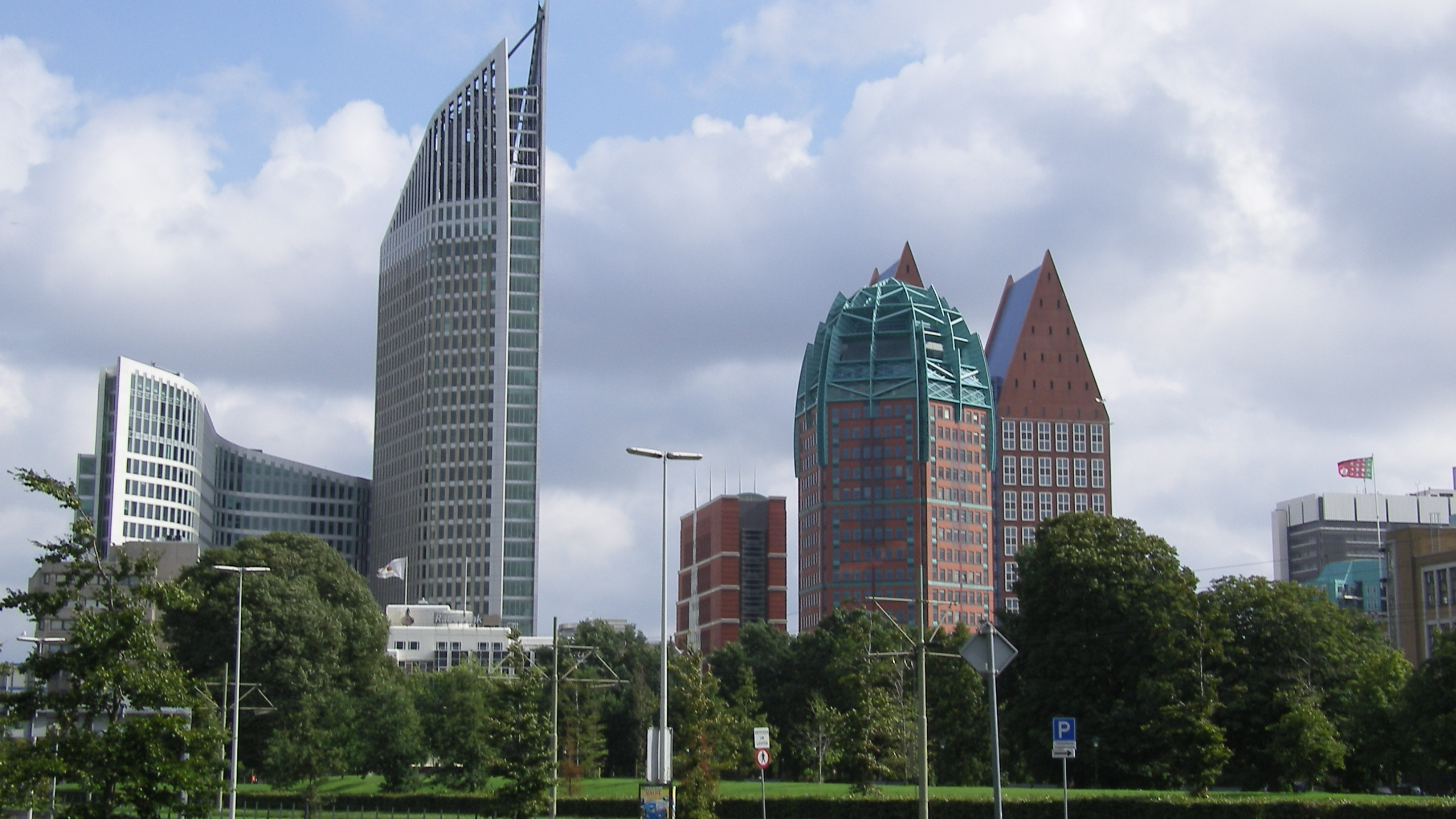
Hoftoren and Castalia building

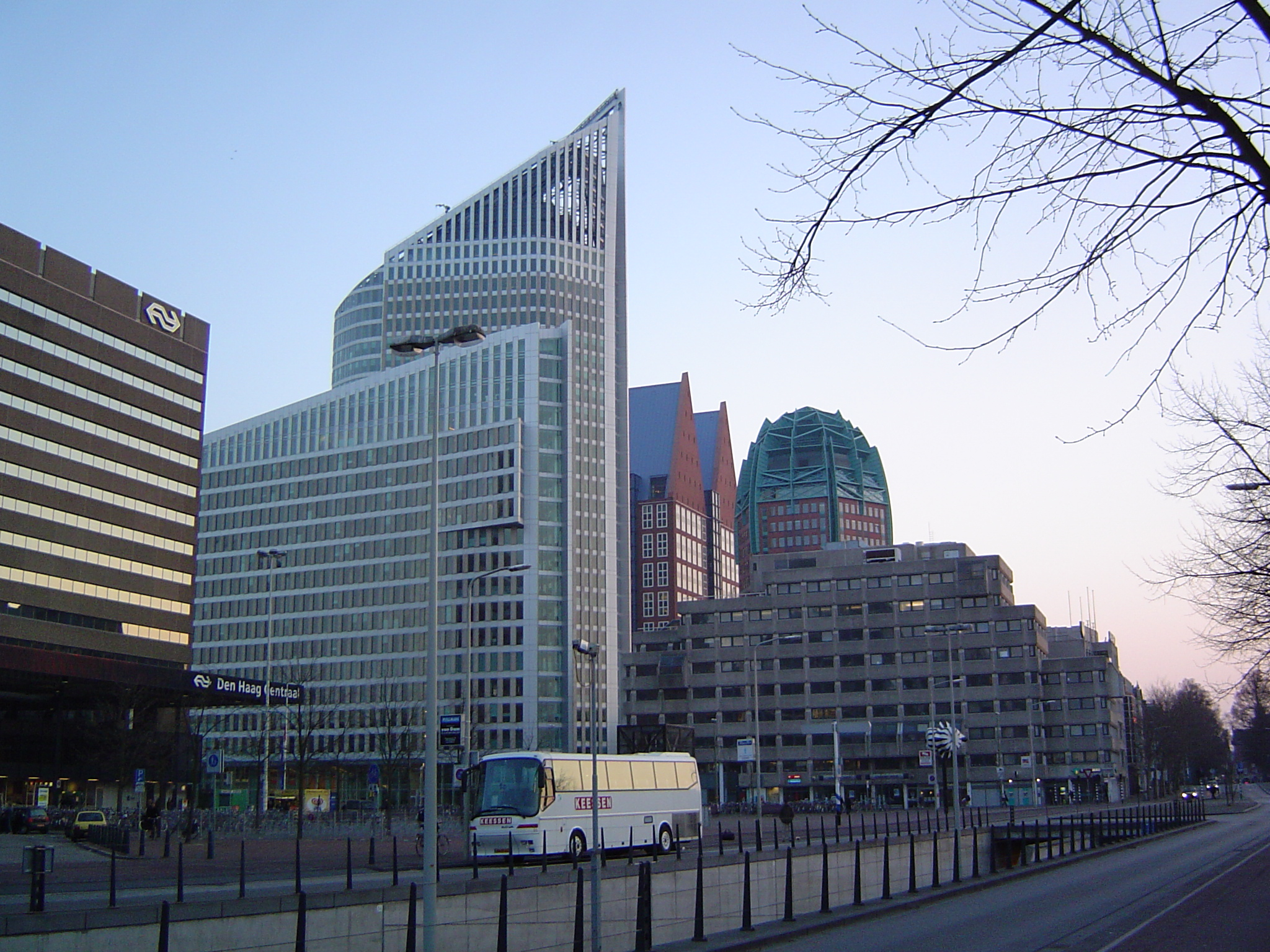
Skyline The Hague

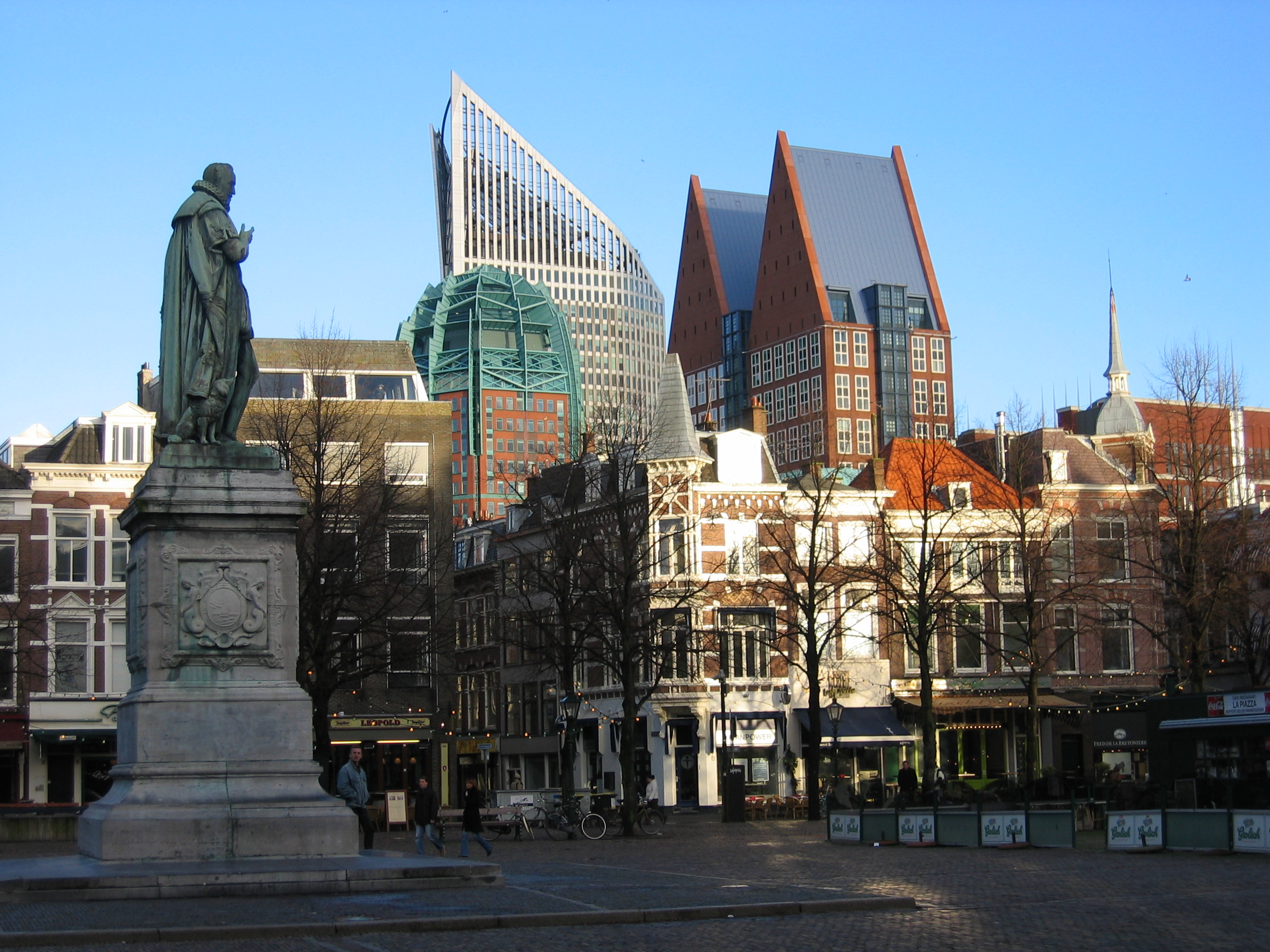
Hoftoren (centre) seen from Plein square
