= Noordereiland =

Coordinates: 51°54′49″N 4°29′42″E

- Neighborhood of Rotterdam
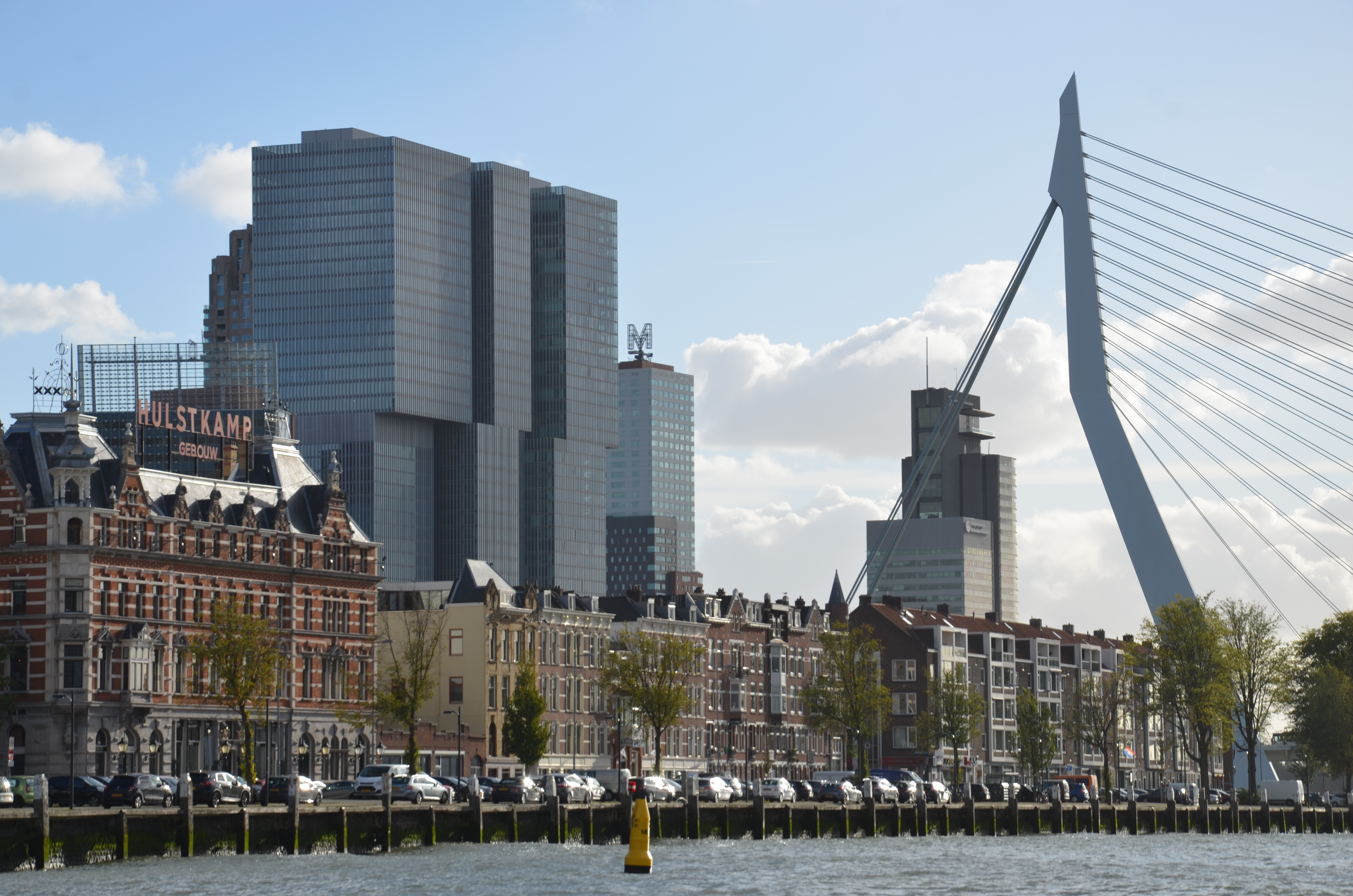
- The Noordereiland in Rotterdam, with De Rotterdam in the background on the left, the Erasmus Bridge on the right, and the Maaskade in the foreground, with the Hulstkamp building on the left
- Interactive map of Noordereiland
- Country: Netherlands
- Province: South Holland
- COROP: Rotterdam
- Borough: Feijenoord
- Time zone: UTC+1 (CET)

Noordereiland is a neighborhood of Rotterdam, Netherlands. The Noordereiland owes its name to the Noorderhaven (nowadays Koningshaven) which, under the leadership of C.B. van der Tak was dug between 1872 and 1874. By digging the Noorderhaven, the Noordereiland was separated from the former island of Fijenoord and is now an island between the central parts of the North and South side of the city. Until the end of the 20th century the island was inhabited by a large population of inland skippers. Part of the neighborhood is a protected cityscape.

In 1883 the Russian Achilles M. De Khotinsky built the first light bulb and accumulator factory in the Netherlands at Prins Hendrikkade 35. The oldest Rhine shipping company for bulk goods W. van Driel Stoomboot- & Transportbedrijven was founded in 1888 by Willem van Driel sr. (1845-1911), with headquarters on the Noordereiland in Rotterdam on the Maaskade to operate a tugboat company and to focus on mass transport to the Rhine of grain, ore, etc. The Hulstkamp building from 1892 is a national heritage monument on the Maaskade. At the beginning of the Burgemeester Hoffmanplein is the Wilhelmina fountain designed by Henri Evers in 1898 on the occasion of the accession of Queen Wilhelmina to the throne. In 1907, the municipality of Rotterdam opened a floating wooden bathing and swimming facility on the Maaskade, which was closed in 1962 due to polluted river water and because there was no money left for maintenance. With the arrival of the container and the relocation of port activities to Botlek, Europoort and Maasvlakte, the Noordereiland has become more residential.

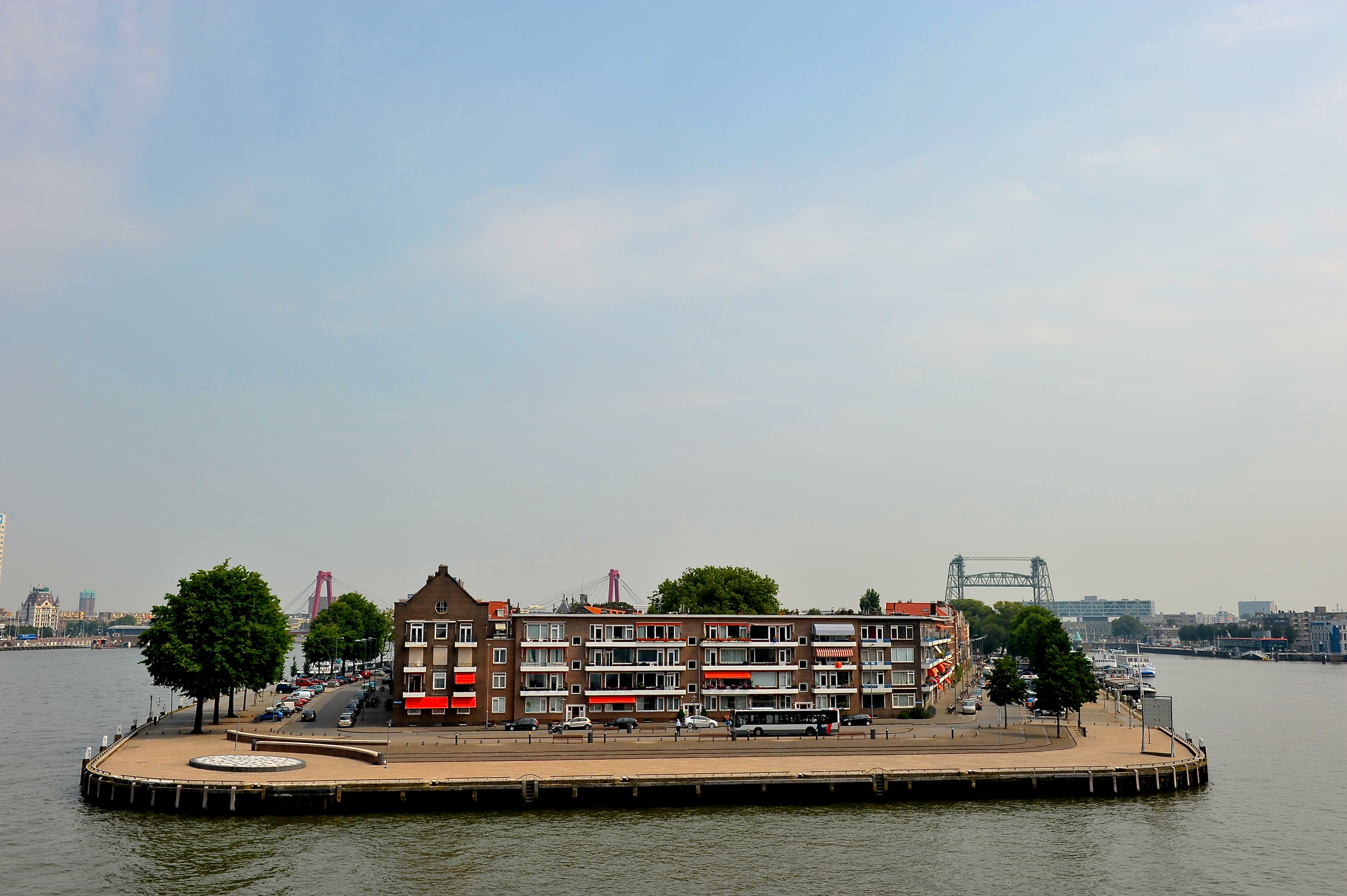
Noordereiland Rotterdam, Prinsenhoofd seen from the West.

During the German bombings in May 1940, the Noordereiland was much better preserved than other parts of the city, because the Noordereiland was spared by the Luftwaffe, as the Germans had entrenched themselves there. However, more than 600 houses on the tips of the Noordereiland were destroyed by a number of English bombardments, which were intended to chase the Germans away. One of the affected points, the old Prinsenhoofd, was partly excavated in 1961 to form a trench at a depth of 20 meters in the riverbed of the Nieuwe Maas during the construction of the Rotterdam Metro. The green strip at Meeuwenstraat now bears the name Prinsenhoofd.

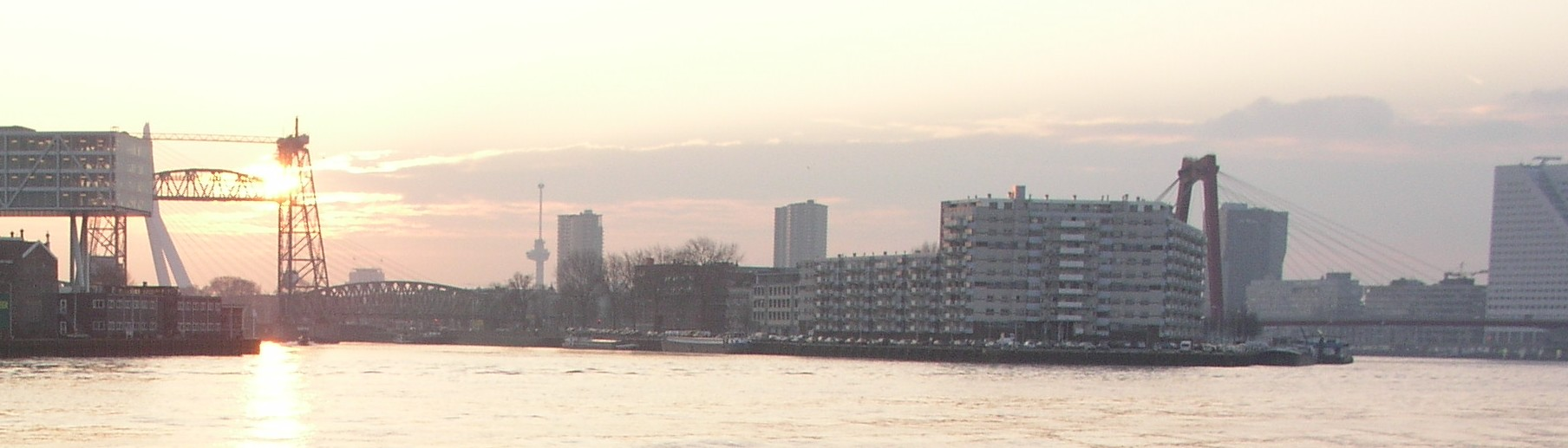
Panoramic view of Rotterdam seen from the East, with the Noordereiland on the right.

The construction of the new Willemsbrug in 1981 and the Willemsspoortunnel (Willems railway tunnel) in 1994 have changed the east side of the island quite a bit due to the demolition of old buildings and new building construction.
