= Kop van Zuid =

- Neighborhood of Rotterdam
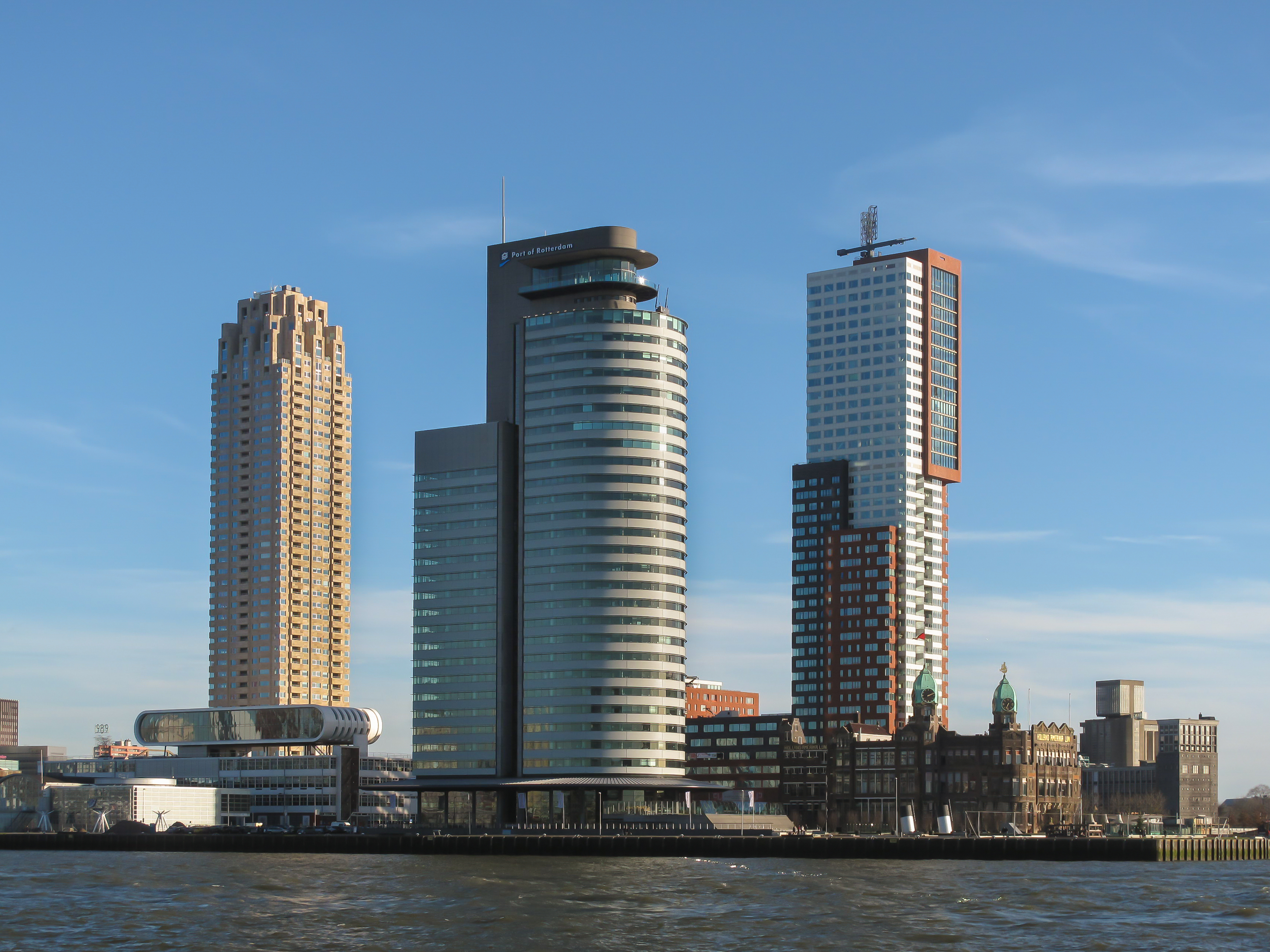
- World Port Center, Montevideo, and hotel New York

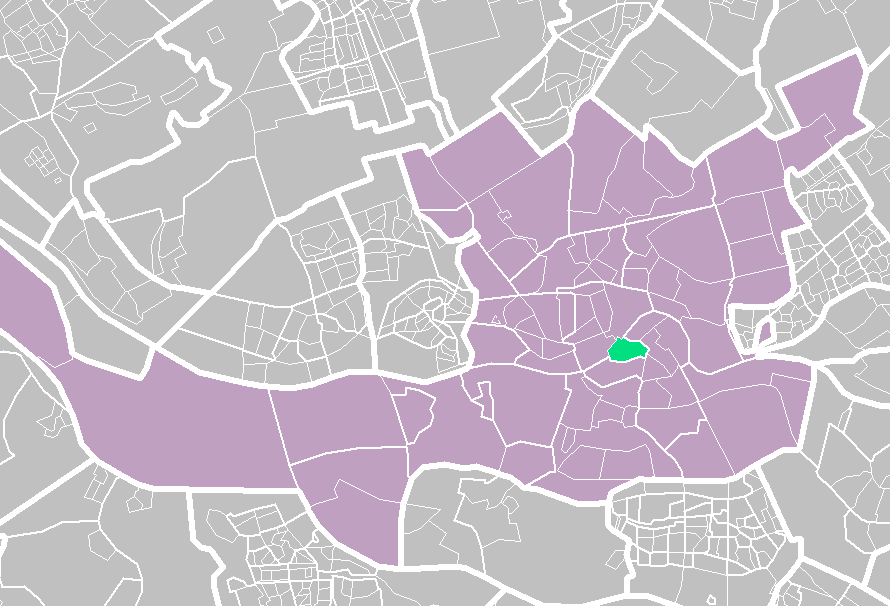
- Coordinates: 51°54′25″N 4°29′30″E
- Country: Netherlands
- Province: South Holland
- Municipality: Rotterdam
- Borough: Feijenoord
- Time zone: UTC+1 (CET)

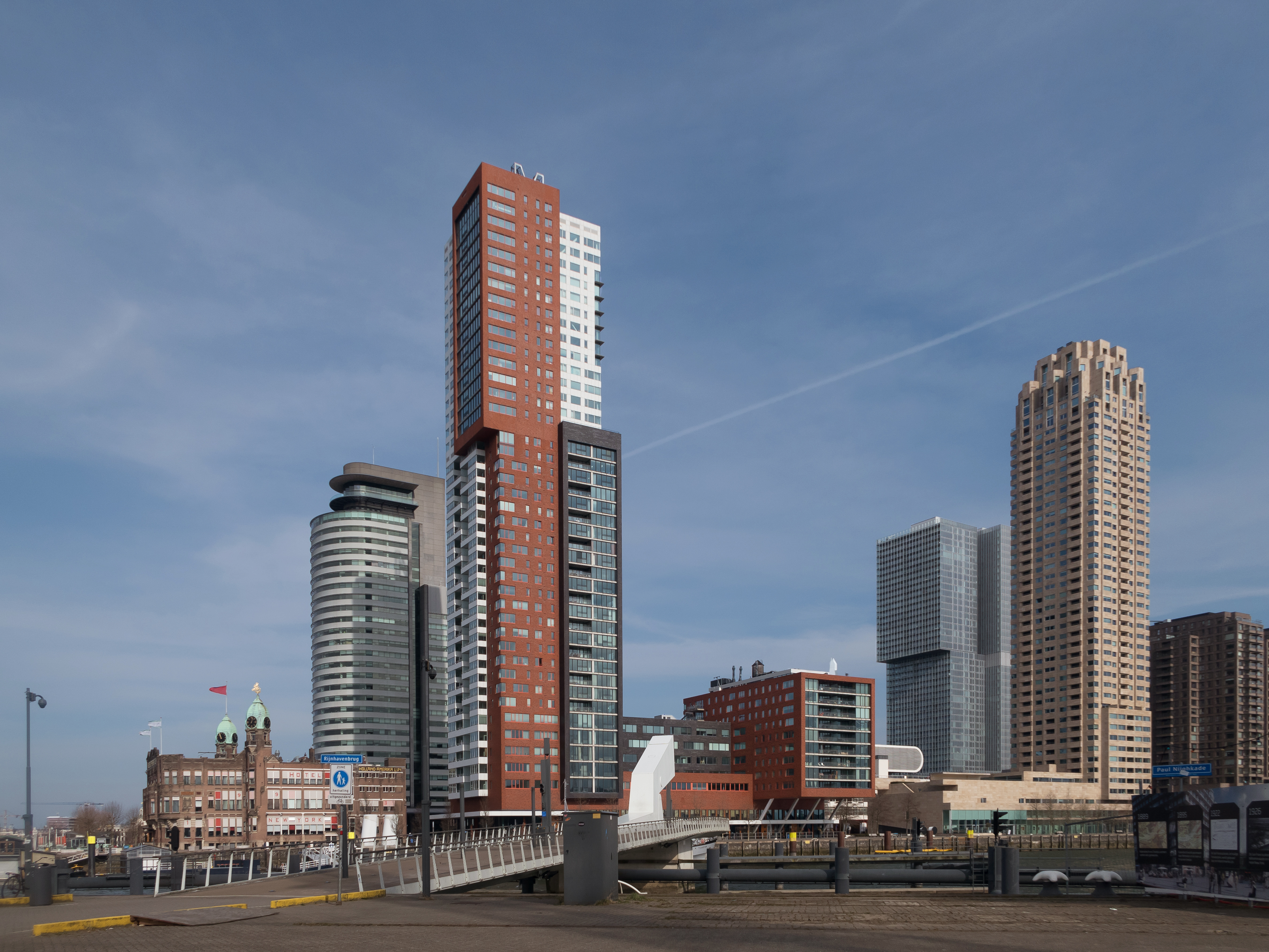
The Kop van Zuid from the de Rijnhavenbrug with Hotel New York, the Port of Rotterdam, the Montevideo and the Rotterdam

Kop van Zuid (Dutch pronunciation: [ˌkɔpfɑnˈzœyt]) is a neighborhood of Rotterdam, Netherlands, located on the south bank of the Nieuwe Maas opposite the center of town. The district is relatively young and includes the Wilhelmina Pier as well as the V bounded by the Rose Street and railway line on one side and the Rotterdam-Dordrecht Hilledijk, Hill Street and Rijnhaven on the other.

The Kop van Zuid is built on old, abandoned port areas around the Binnenhaven, Entrepothaven, Spoorweghaven, Rijnhaven and the Wilhelmina Pier. These port sites and the Nieuwe Maas made for a large physical distance between the center and north of the Maas and southern Rotterdam. By converting this area into an urban area, and providing better infrastructure, planners sought to unite the northern and southern parts of the city.

== Buildings ==
- Entrepotgebouw (1879)
- Poortgebouw (1879)
- 't Leidsche Veem (1896)
- Hotel New York (1901)
- Las Palmas (1953)
- De Peperklip (1982)
- Erasmusbrug (bridge) (1996)
- Wilhelminahof: Court and Tax (1997)
- Toren op Zuid (2000)
- Hogeschool Inholland (2000)
- World Port Center (2001)
- Luxor Theater (2001)
- Montevideo (2005)
- De Compagnie (2005)
- Maastoren (2010)
- New Orleans (2010)
- De Rotterdam (2013)
