= De Rotterdam =

Building on the Wilhelminapier in Rotterdam

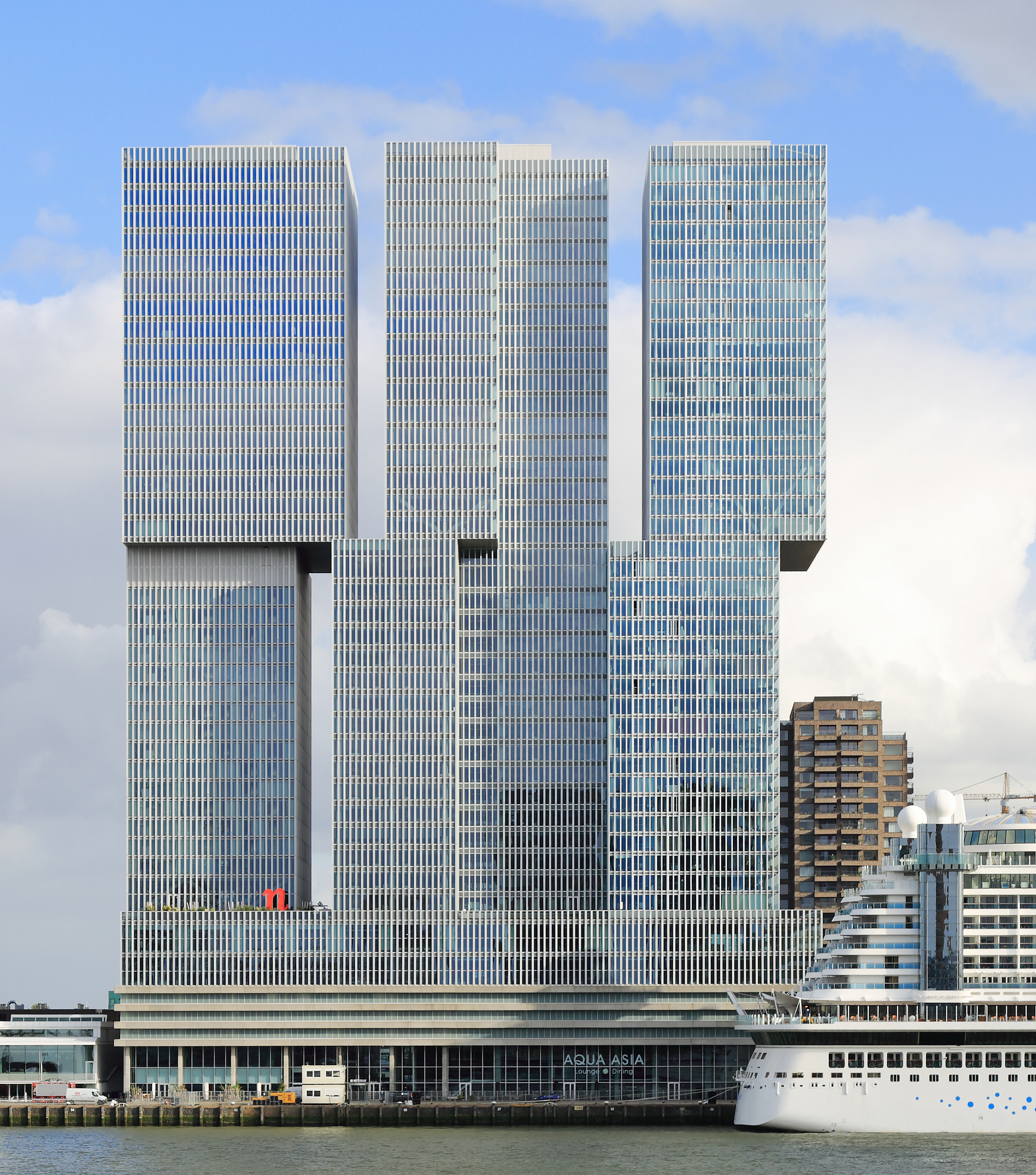
- North-side of De Rotterdam

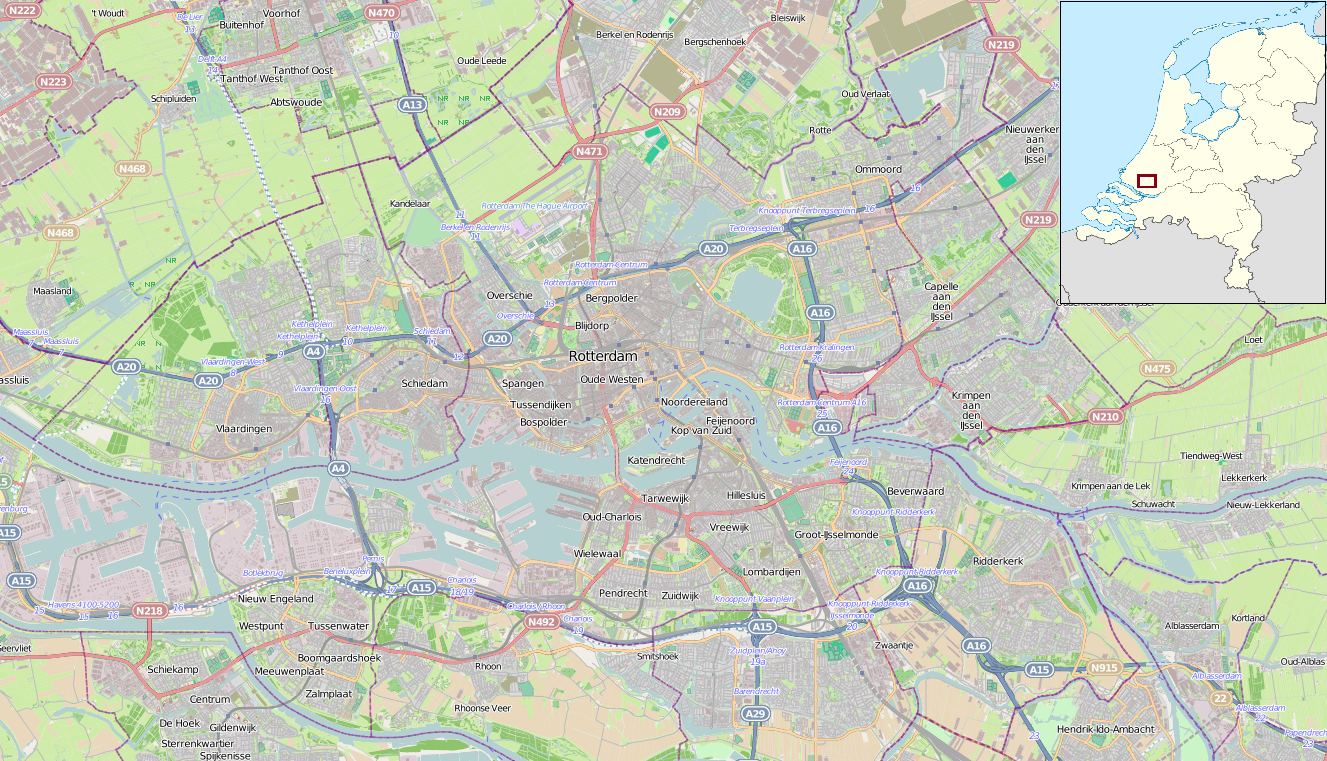
- Location within Rotterdam

General information
- Status: Completed
- Type: Residence, Office, Leisure
- Location: Rotterdam (Wilhelmina Pier)
- Coordinates: 51°54′24″N 4°29′17″E
- Construction started: 2009
- Completed: 2013
- Opening: 2013
- Cost: €340,000,000
- Owner: Deka Immobilien

Height
- Architectural: 151.3 m (496.4 ft)
- Tip: 151.3 m (496.4 ft)
- Roof: 149 m (488.8 ft)

Dimensions
- Weight: 230,000 t

Technical details
- Floor count: 45
- Floor area: 160,000 m^{2} (1,722,226 sq ft)

Design and construction
- Architect: OMA
- Developer: Edge

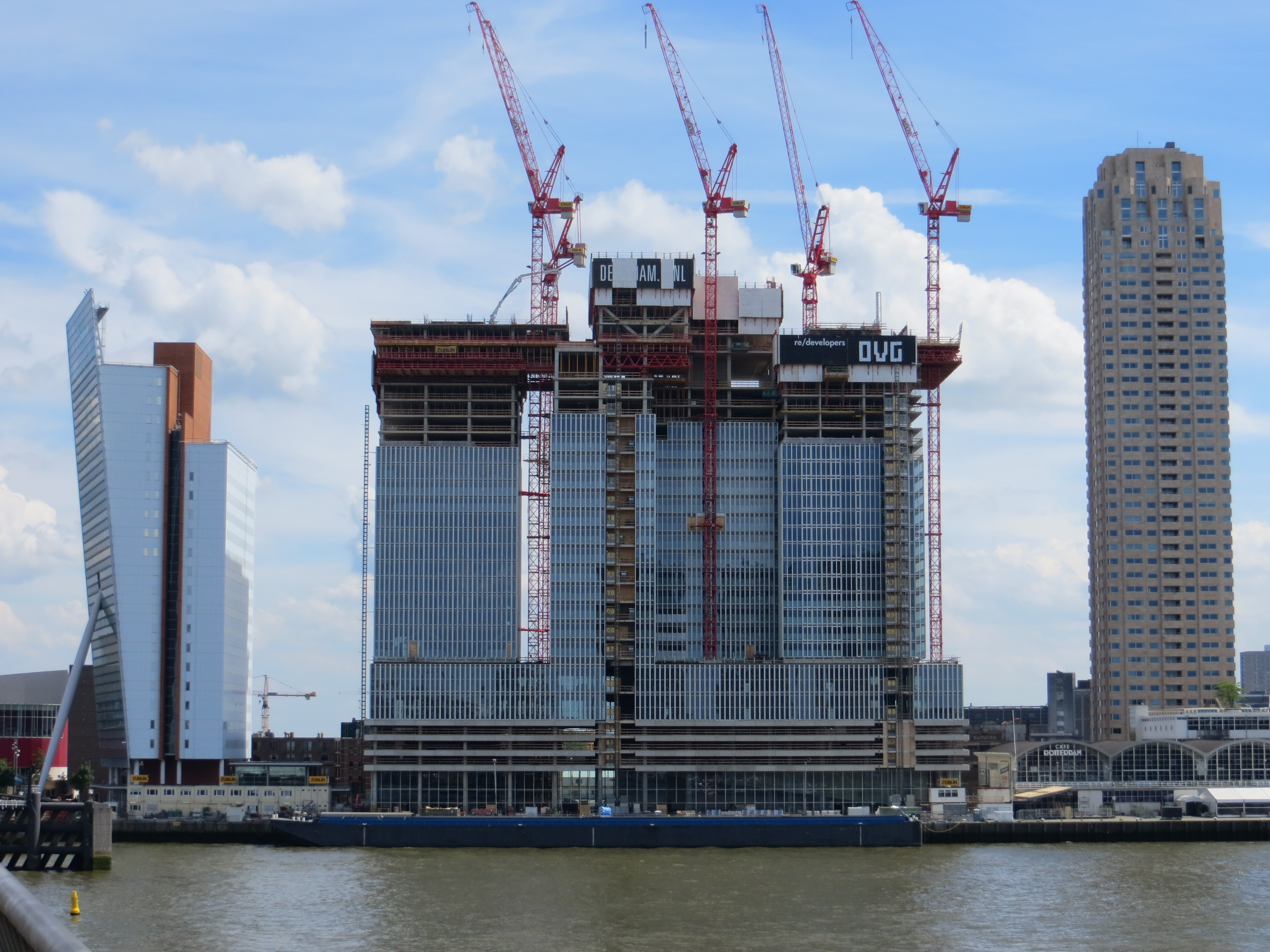
June 2012: De Rotterdam under construction, as seen from the Erasmus Bridge. Left the KPN Tower, right New Orleans. The low rise in front is the Rotterdam Cruise Terminal.

De Rotterdam is a skyscraper on the Wilhelminapier in Rotterdam, designed by the Office for Metropolitan Architecture in 1998 and developed by Edge. The complex is located between the KPN Tower and Rotterdam Cruise Terminal and was finalized at the end of 2013. On 21 November 2013, the municipality of Rotterdam, as the largest user, received the keys. The design provides space for offices, a hotel and apartments. The 45 floors amount to a total floor space area of about 160,000 m², making it the largest building in the Netherlands.

== Realisation ==
Construction began in 2009, when the municipality committed itself to hire 25,000 m² of the office space. The highest point (at 151 meters) was reached at the end of 2012, and the building was ready on its scheduled date of 15 November 2013. The total cost at the start of construction in 2009 was estimated to be €340,000,000.

== Appearance and construction ==
Rem Koolhaas, who once considered a career in film, reasoned that the most frequent view of these structures would be in motion, from the window of a car. As the view changes, the towers, rising from a shared six-story plinth, separate and then merge. The building consists of three interconnected towers that share a thirty feet high base which includes six floors. The lower two layers form a large glass plinth. At about 90 meters above ground the towers – known as West Tower, Mid Tower and East Tower– are shifted a few meters in different directions, which enhances the wind stability and provides space for terraces. In the original design the towers did not touch each other, but in order to simplify the play of forces and to keep the construction affordable they are now connected in a few places. The facade provides the option of natural ventilation. On the west side there are balconies that are accessible from the apartments.

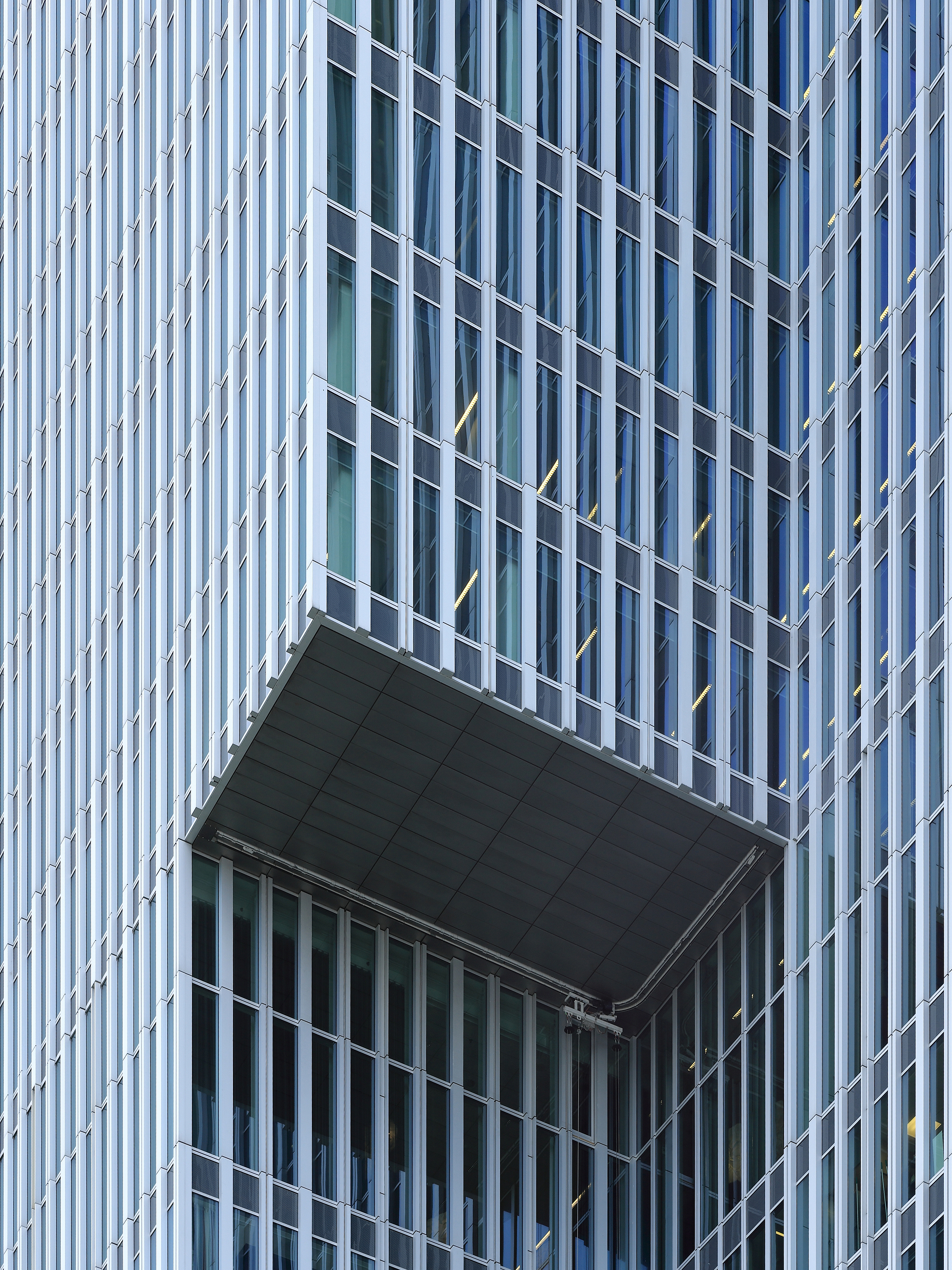
Detail of facade

== Usage ==
De Rotterdam is designed for residency, labor and leisure. The largest part is intended as office space and residency. It has 240 apartments, 72,000 m^{2} of offices, conference rooms and an underground parking with two floors providing over 684 parking spaces There is also a hotel with 285 rooms and 1500 m^{2} is assigned to cafes and restaurants. For fitness facilities 2,500 m^{2} is reserved and for shops 5,000 m^{2}. The functions are grouped into blocks, but the different user groups meet at various places in the building, a concept that is defined by the Office for Metropolitan Architecture as a vertical city. De Rotterdam will be used daily by about 5,000 people and with a floor space index of 32 De Rotterdam forms the most densely built part of the Netherlands.
