= Willemsbrug =

William Bridge Willemsbrug
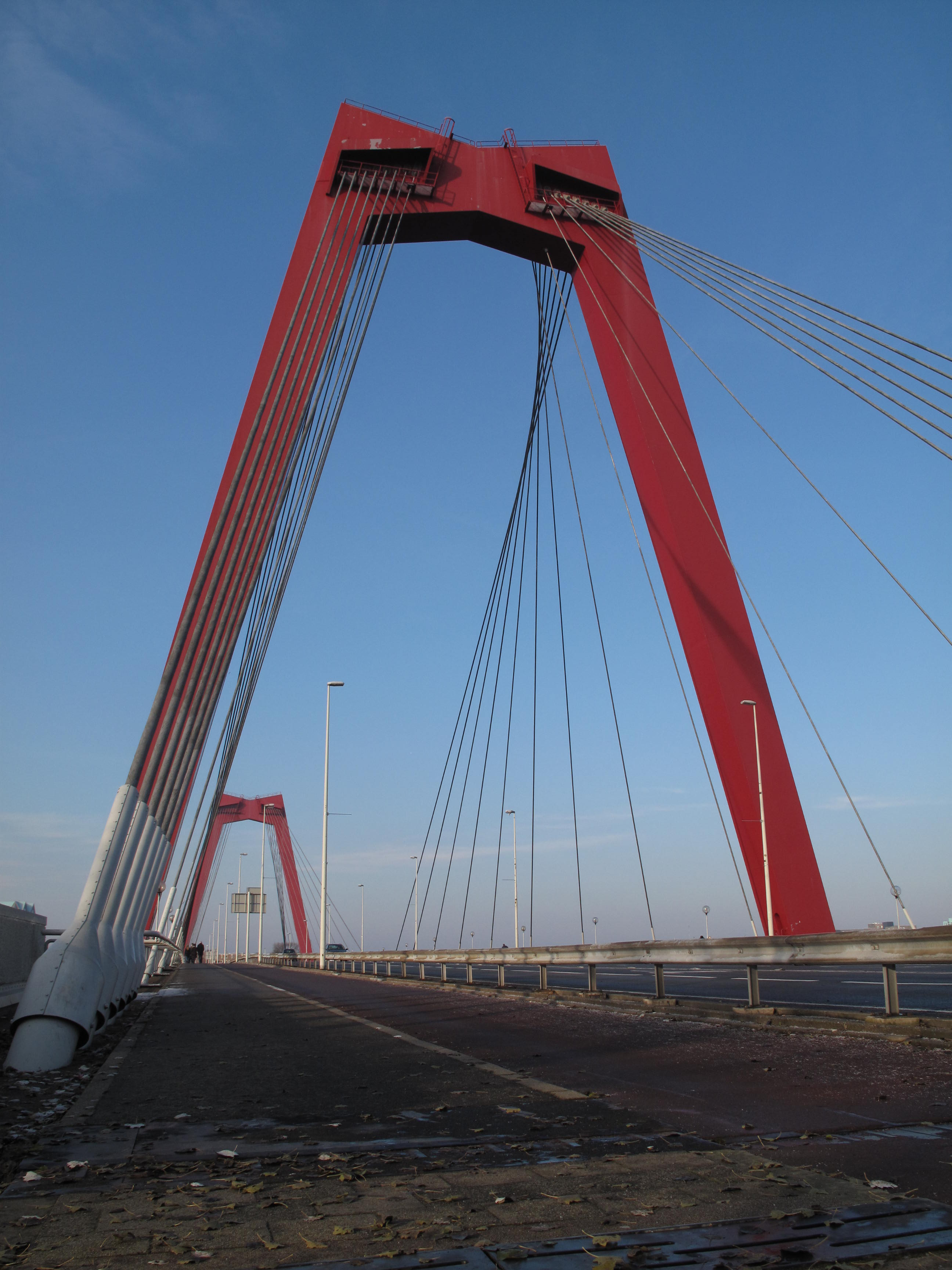
- Coordinates: 51°55′02″N 4°29′44″E
- Crosses: Nieuwe Maas
- Locale: Rotterdam
- Preceded by: Willemsbrug (1879)

Characteristics
- Design: Cable-stayed bridge
- Total length: 318m
- Width: 33m
- Height: 65m
- Longest span: 270m

History
- Architect: Cor Veerling (Gemeentewerken)
- Construction start: 1975
- Construction end: 1981
- Opened: 1981

Location
- Interactive map of William Bridge

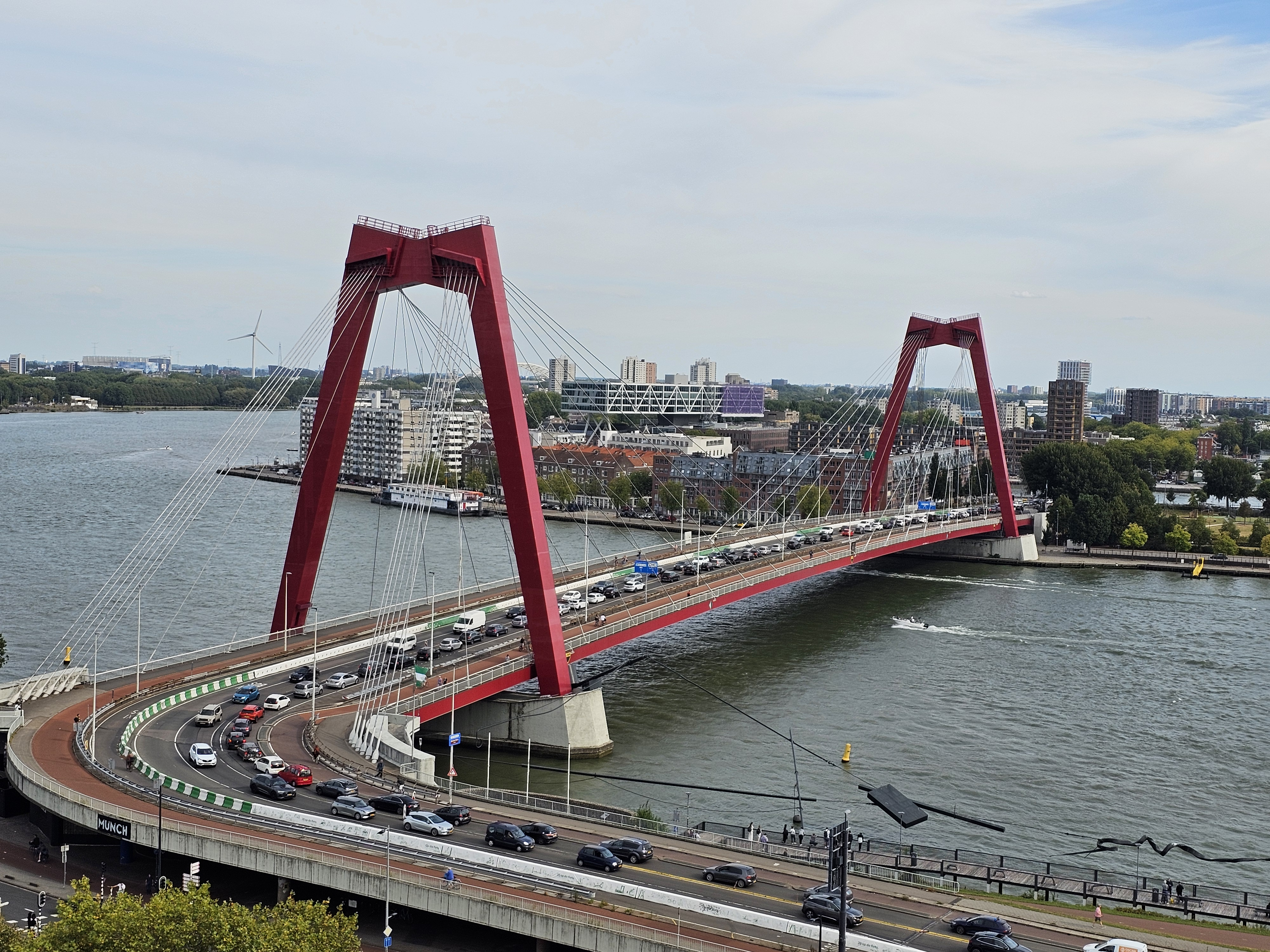
The Willemsbrug as seen from the Witte Huis

The Willemsbrug (English: "William Bridge") is a bridge next to the Erasmusbrug in the centre of Rotterdam, Netherlands, spanning the Nieuwe Maas. It links the northern part of the city with the Noordereiland and (in combination with the Koninginnebrug) the district of Feijenoord.

The bridge was completed in 1981, designed by C. Veerling and named after King Willem III of the Netherlands. It replaced an older bridge that had been opened in 1879 but was severely outdated by the time the decision was made to build a new one. Because of the intensity of the traffic using the old bridge, it was decided to build the new one 150 metres upstream to avoid upsetting the daily flow of traffic across the river. After the completion of the new bridge, the old one was demolished.

The Willemsbrug is a cable-stayed bridge with a total span of about 318 meters. It is painted in a red color which puts it in sharp contrast with the light blue painted Erasmus Bridge.

== See also ==
- Maasbeeld
