= Euromast =

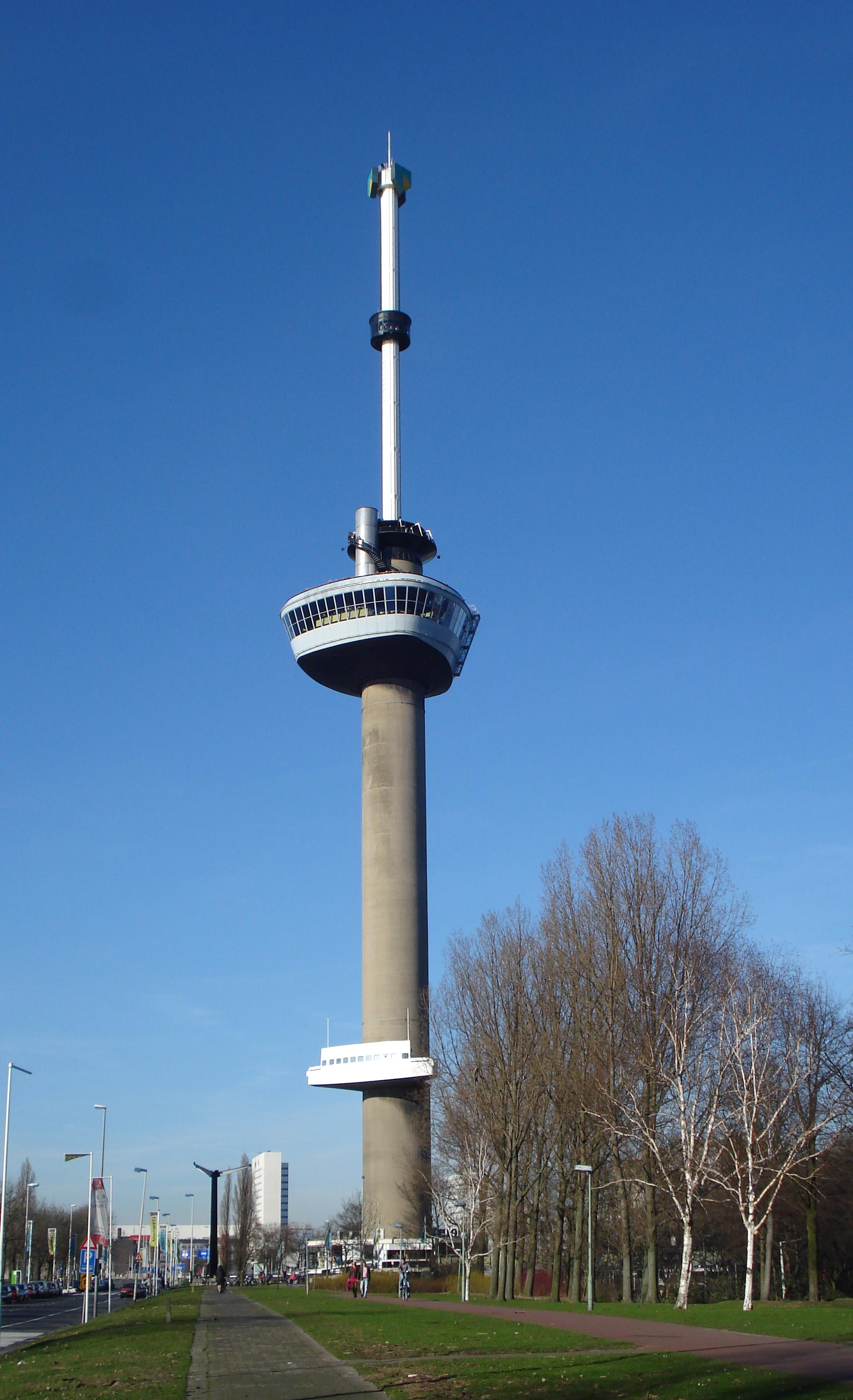
- Interactive map of the Euromast area

General information
- Type: Observation tower Hotel
- Architectural style: Modernism
- Location: Parkhaven 20; Rotterdam, Netherlands
- Coordinates: 51.906111°N 4.465833°E
- Completed: 1958-1960
- Renovated: 1970

Height
- Antenna spire: 184.6 m (606 ft)
- Roof: 104 m (341 ft)

Technical details
- Lifts/elevators: 2

Design and construction
- Architects: Maaskant, van Dommelen, Kroos en Senf
- Engineer: A. J. van Neste; R. Swart (engineer)
- Main contractor: Aanneming Maatschappij J.P. van Eesteren

Euromast is an observation tower in Rotterdam, Netherlands, designed by Hugh Maaskant constructed between 1958 and 1960. It was specially built for the 1960 Floriade, and is a listed monument since 2010. The tower is a concrete structure with an internal diameter of 9 m (30 ft) and a wall thickness of 30 cm (12 in). For stability it is built on a concrete block of 1,900,000 kg (4,200,000 lb) so that the centre of gravity is below ground. It has a "crow's nest" observation platform 96 m (315 ft) above ground and a restaurant. Originally 101 m (331 ft) in height it was the tallest building in Rotterdam. It lost this position to the high-rise of Erasmus MC (113.5 m, 372 ft) which was completed in 1968, but regained it when the Space Tower was added to the top of the building in 1970, giving an additional 85 m (279 ft). Euromast was the highest building of the Netherlands, but was surpassed by De Zalmhaven, also in Rotterdam, in 2021. It is also a member of the World Federation of Great Towers. In 2008, 2009 and 2019, the tower hosted an extreme sports event which featured BASE jumping.

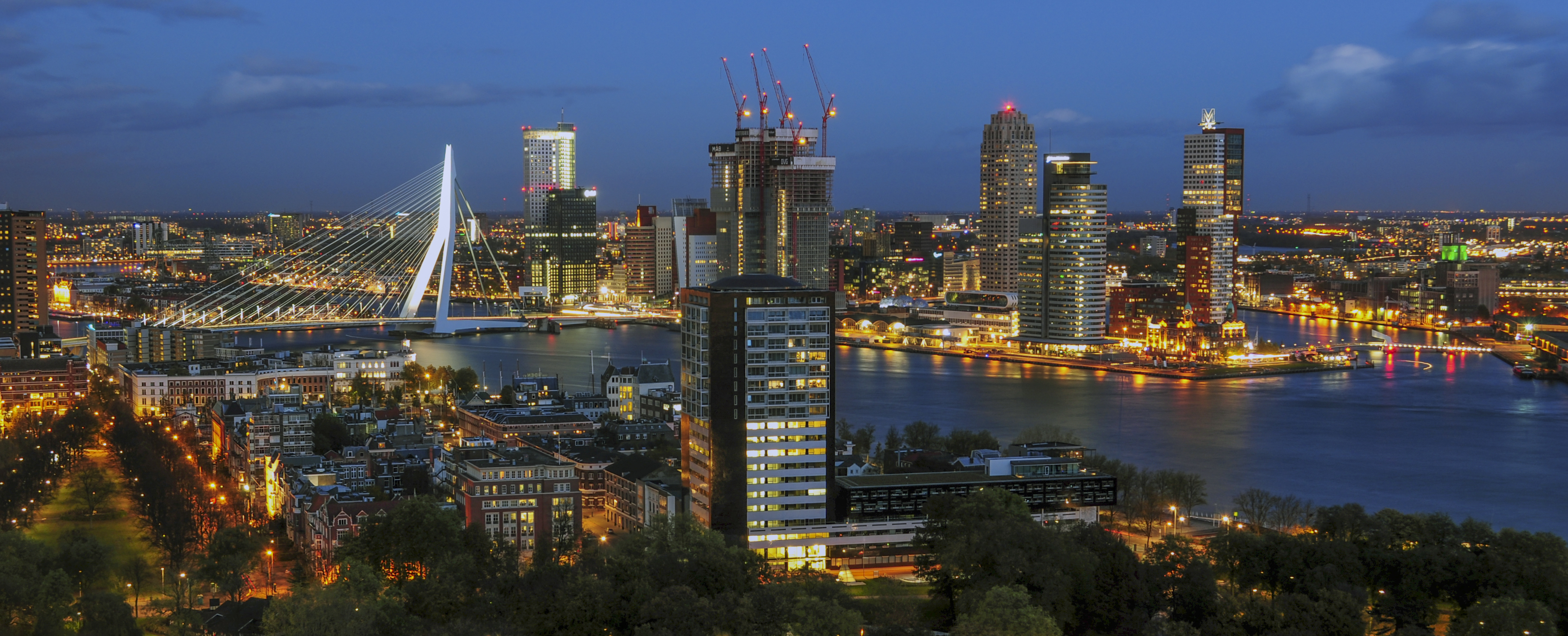
View from the Euromast in 2012, with the Erasmus Bridge on the left

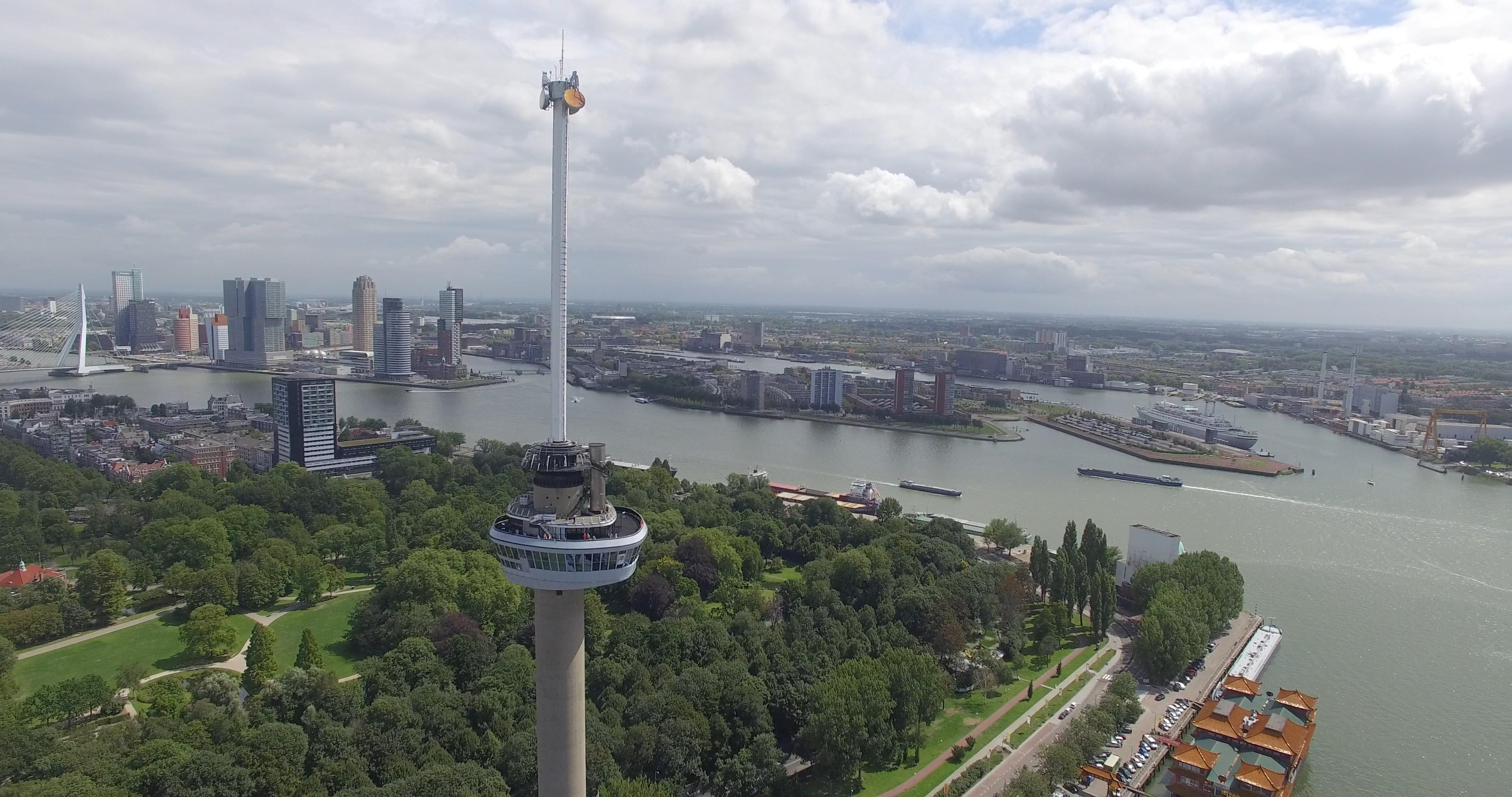
Aerial view at the Euromast in 2015, with the Kop van Zuid and Katendrecht neighbourhoods in the background

== See also ==
- List of towers
- Floriade 1960
