= Maasbeeld =

Public artwork by Auke de Vries in Rotterdam, the Netherlands

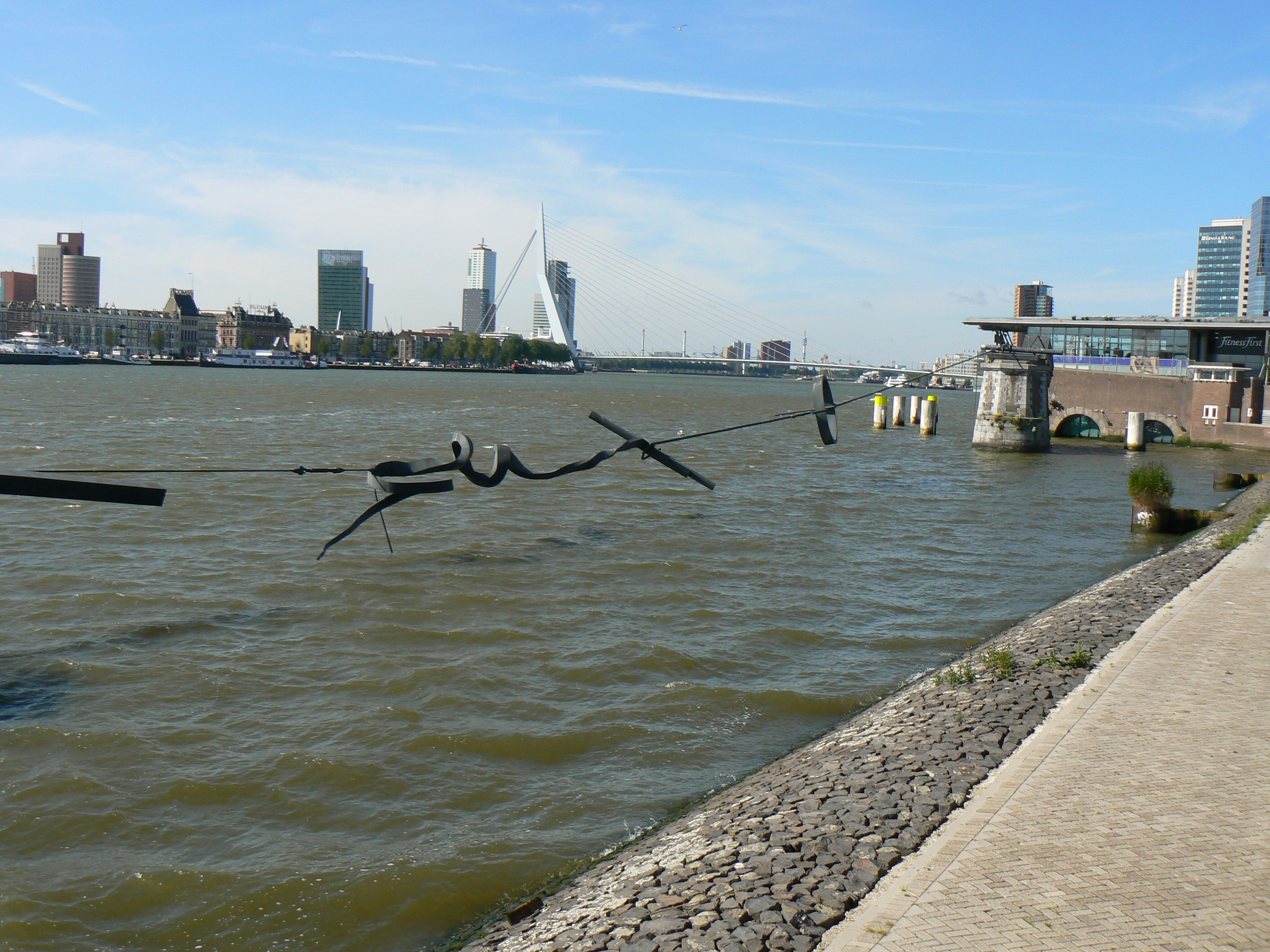
- Year: 1983
- Dimensions: 182 cm (72 in)

Maasbeeld is a sculpture by Auke de Vries located above the Maas River in the Dutch city of Rotterdam. It balances in the middle of the Willemsbrug Bridge and a pillar of the dismantled railroad bridge. Locally, the Maas sculpture is known as The Clothesline (Dutch: De waslijn).

== Description ==
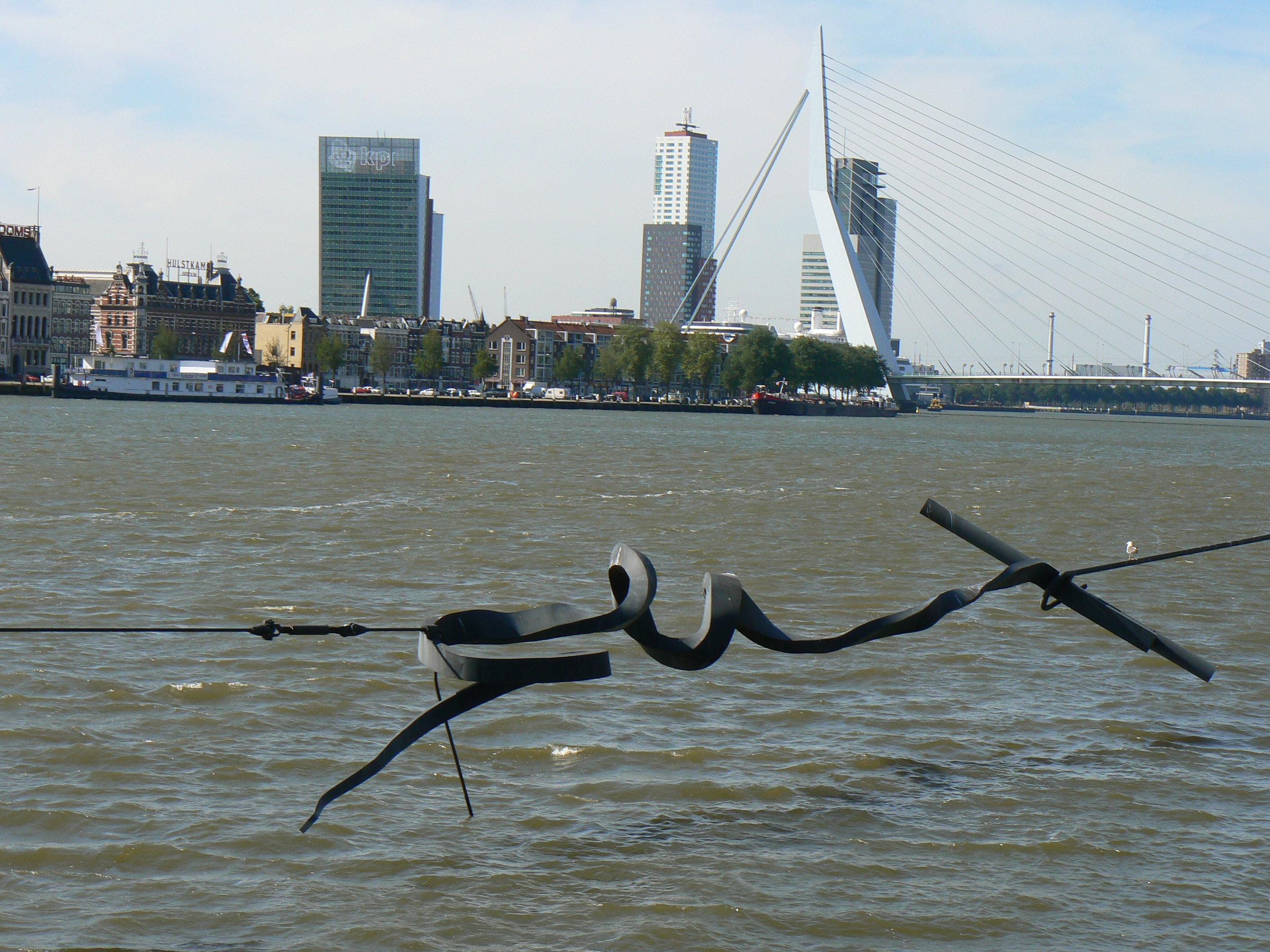
The statue is hung above the river

The artwork is 182 meters long and consists of steel cable and several abstract elements suspended above the water of the Maas River. At high tide, one sphere floats in the water. Due to the wind and possibly wave action, the artwork is often in motion. The placing of the various elements suggests a subtle equilibrium as if it is not a heavy construction but a light piece of cord that remains in balance through a careful composition.

== History ==
For five years (from 1983 to 1988), the sculpture hung between the Willemsbrug and the old railway bridge. This railroad bridge was later demolished due to the construction of a new railway tunnel, so the artwork was stored from 1988 to 1994. That year, it was placed in its current place, between the Willemsbrug and the pillar which was kept as the remains of the old railway bridge. A large heavy block was added to the sculpture to balance and hold the art piece which couldn't be held by the railway bridge anymore.
