= W. van Driel (shipping company) =

The oldest Rhine shipping company for bulk goods W. van Driel Stoomboot- & Transportbedrijven (W. van Driel Steamboat & Transport Companies) was founded in 1888 by Willem van Driel sr. (1845-1911), with headquarters on the Noordereiland in Rotterdam on the Maaskade to operate a tugboat company and to focus on mass transport to the Rhine of grain, ore, etc.

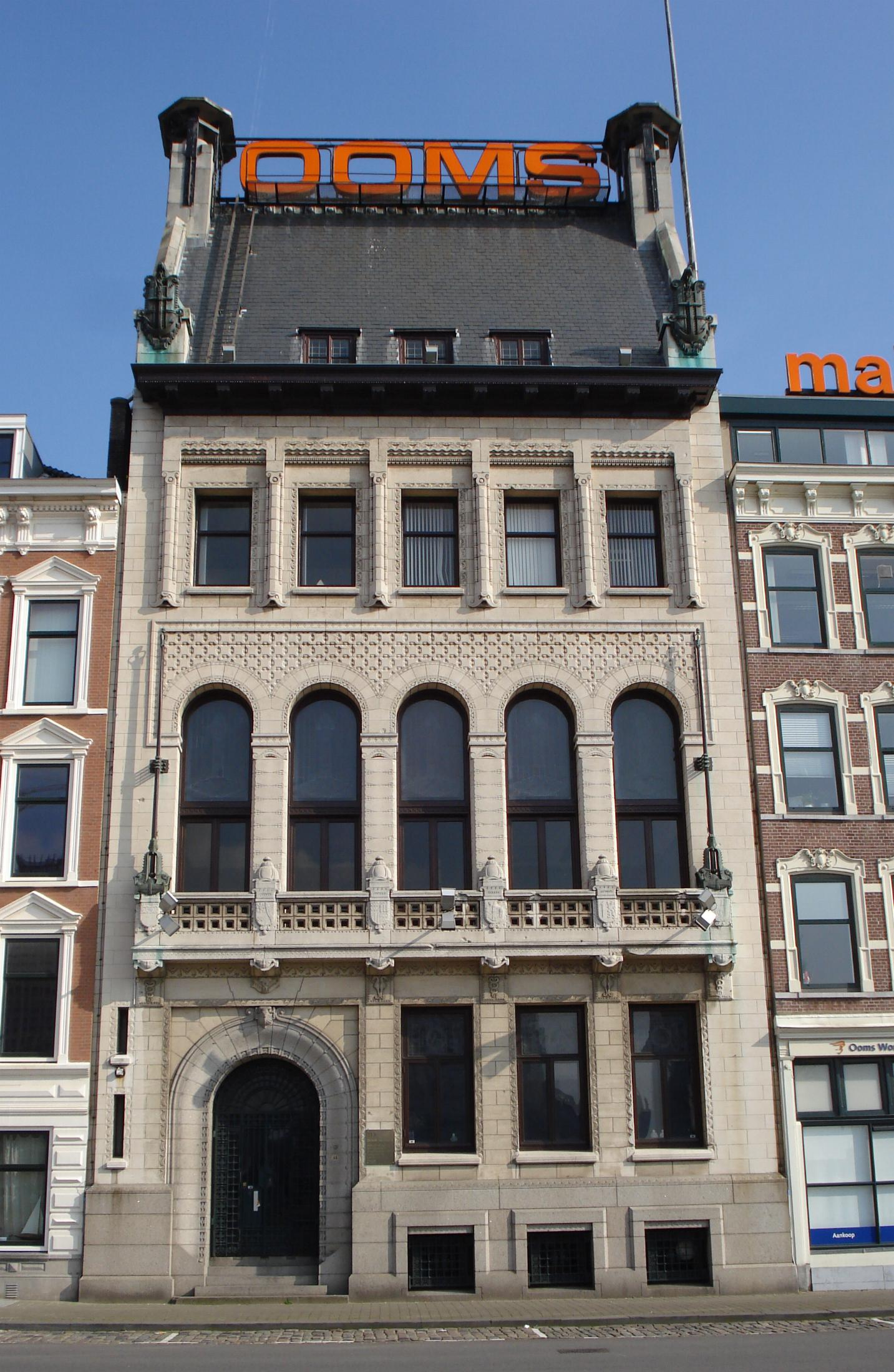
Former headquarters W. van Driel on the Maaskade 113, now a Rijksmonument

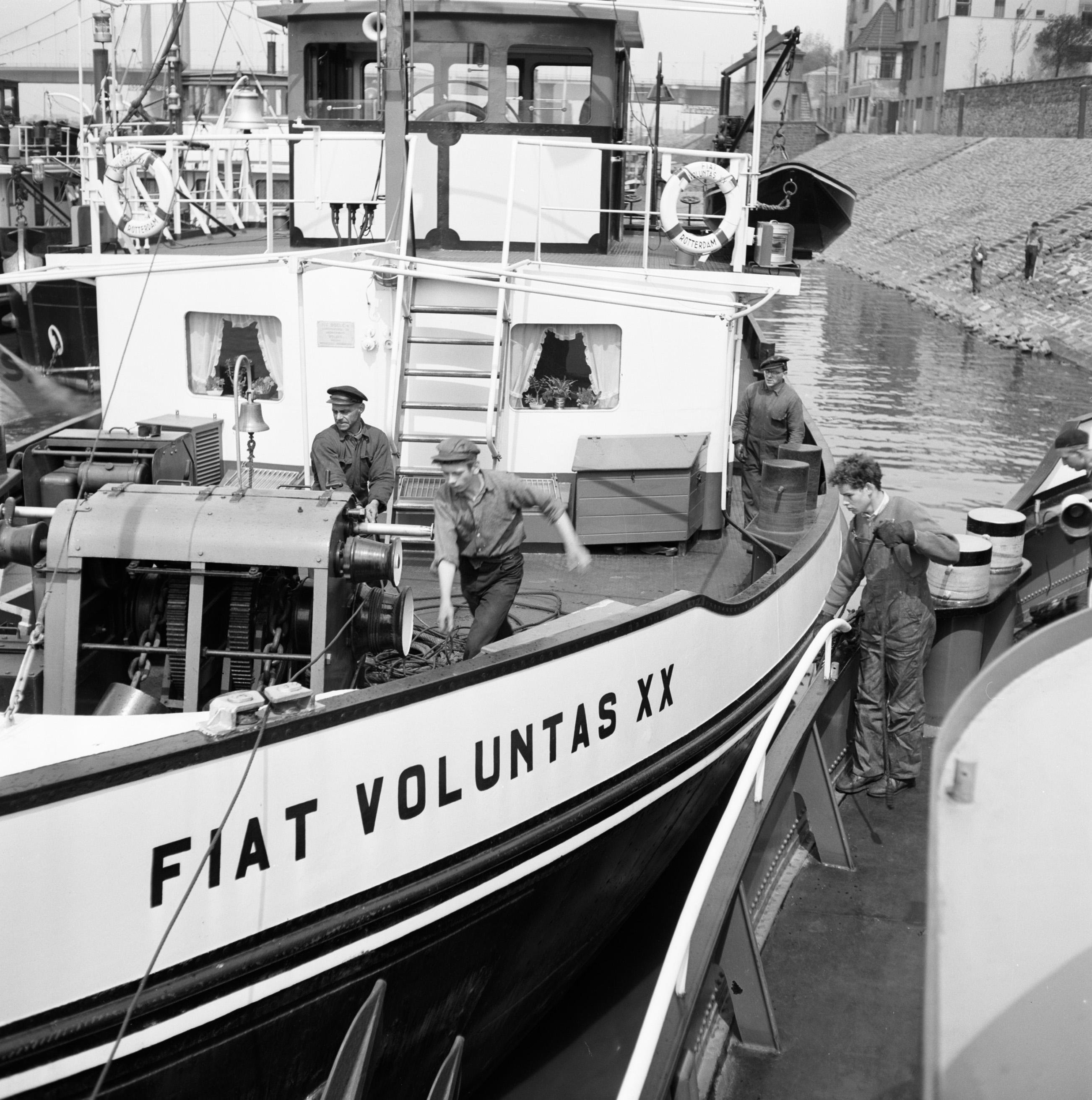
Tugboat Fiat Voluntas XX moors in the port Duisburg-Ruhrort, 1955

Willem van Driel Sr. had worked his way up from sailor to captain on the Waal tugboat Nieuwe Zorg, which he later purchased, before setting up his tugboat company. The first tugboat in a series, called Fiat Voluntas I, was launched in 1884 at the Wilton shipyard in Rotterdam. These tugs usually had a length of about 30 metres (98 ft) and a draft of 2 metres (6 ft 7 in), which made them excellent for navigation on the Rhine. In the end, 29 tugs were built or bought between 1884 and 1966. In 1913 the fleet had already been expanded to 17 tugs and 41 towage vessels. In the end, more than 80 towage vessels were built or bought, mainly named W. van Driel 34 to 72, and seven motor vessels, the last of which was scrapped in 1985. Between 1916 and 1937, 13 more coasters were built. In the following years, a 700-ton crane vessel, a 1,550-ton tow crane and steamships followed. In the beginning of the 1980s, eight cargo barges were built.

Director Willem van Driel jr. built his first office at Maaskade 113, which was occupied in 1915, as an expression of the leading role his company played within the inland shipping companies of that time. In the course of the nineteen-twenties, however, the inland shipping industry deteriorated. In 1927 Van Driel had to sell his prestigious building to another harbor baron, Frans Swartouw. The company continued for a while, partly operating under its own name from the building at Maaskade 127. In 1939 the shipping company was taken over by the Staatsmijnen, (company of state-operated Dutch coal mines). W. van Driel was resurrected by the Staatsmijnen after taking heavy blows in the period between the two world wars. World War II caused considerable material damage to the company. In 1945 W. van Driel's fleet, damaged, sunk or burnt out, was scattered across Western Europe. Many ships were sold for scrap. With a large charterer like the Staatsmijnen behind it, the old shipping company was able to develop anew in many directions. In 1998, the shares of the shipping company were sold to the chartering office Van der Graaf & Meeusen, whereby the name of the shipping company continued to exist for the fleet.

In the flag of the shipping company are the words: Fiat Voluntas (Thy will be done) and W.v.D. (Willem van Driel - Wij Varen Door = We Sail On).

== Literature ==
Arie Lentjes (comp. and final ed.). Willem van Driel's Stoomboot- en Transportondernemingen N.V. sinds 1888. Rotterdam, Vereniging De Binnenvaart, 2002. ISBN 90-805143-2-2. Geschiedenis van de binnenscheepvaart, nr. 4.
