= Erasmusbrug =

Erasmus Bridge Erasmusbrug
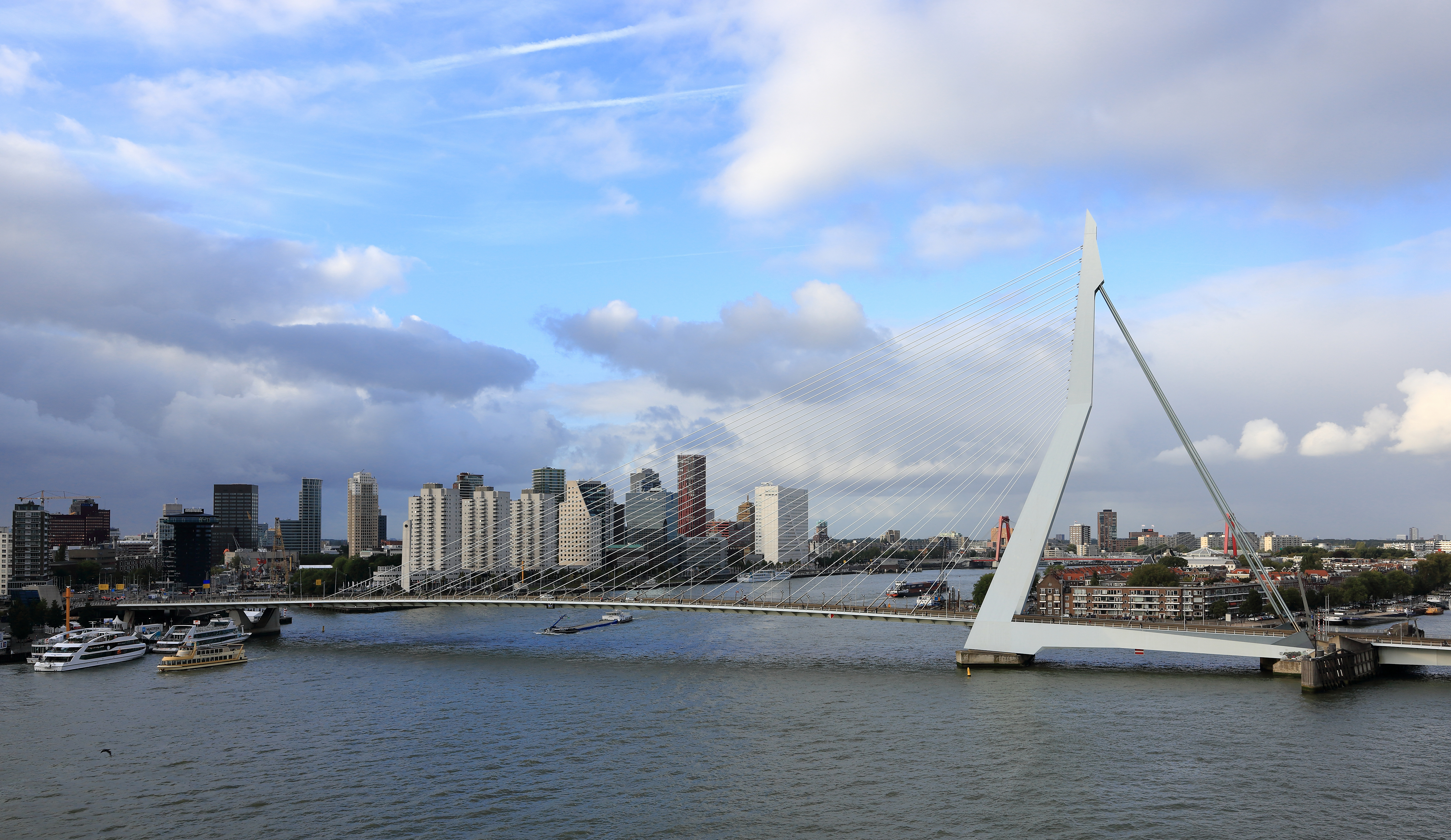
- The Erasmus Bridge in Rotterdam
- Coordinates: 51°54′33″N 4°29′12″E
- Carries: 2 tramway tracks, 4 traffic lanes, 2 cycle tracks, 2 sidewalks
- Crosses: Nieuwe Maas
- Locale: Rotterdam, The Netherlands
- Other name: De Zwaan (The Swan)

Characteristics
- Material: Steel and concrete
- Total length: 802 metres (2,631 ft)
- Width: 33.8 metres (111 ft)
- Height: 139 metres (456 ft)
- Longest span: 285 metres (935 ft)
- No. of spans: 4
- Clearance below: 12.5 metres (41 ft)

History
- Designer: Ben van Berkel
- Construction end: 1996
- Construction cost: € 165 million (365 million Guilders)

Location
- Interactive map of Erasmus Bridge

The Erasmusbrug (English: "Erasmus Bridge") is a combined cable-stayed and bascule bridge. Construction began in 1986 and was completed in 1996. It crosses the Nieuwe Maas in the centre of Rotterdam, connecting the north and south parts of the city. The bridge was named in 1992 after Desiderius Erasmus, a prominent Christian Renaissance humanist also known as Erasmus of Rotterdam. The Erasmus Bridge is Rotterdam's most important landmark and is even part of the city's official logo.

== History ==
The 802-metre-long (2,631 ft) bridge across the New Meuse was designed by Ben van Berkel and completed in 1996. The cable-stayed bridge section has a single 139-metre-high (456 ft) asymmetrical pale blue pylon with a prominent horizontal base, earning the bridge its nickname "The Swan".

The southernmost span of the bridge has an 89-metre-long (292 ft) bascule bridge for ships that cannot pass under the bridge. The bascule bridge is the largest and heaviest in Western Europe and has the largest panel of its type in the world.

Costing over €165 million to construct, the bridge was officially opened by Queen Beatrix on September 6, 1996. Shortly after the bridge opened to traffic in October 1996, it was discovered the bridge would swing under particularly strong wind conditions. To reduce the trembling, stronger shock dampers were installed.

== Design ==
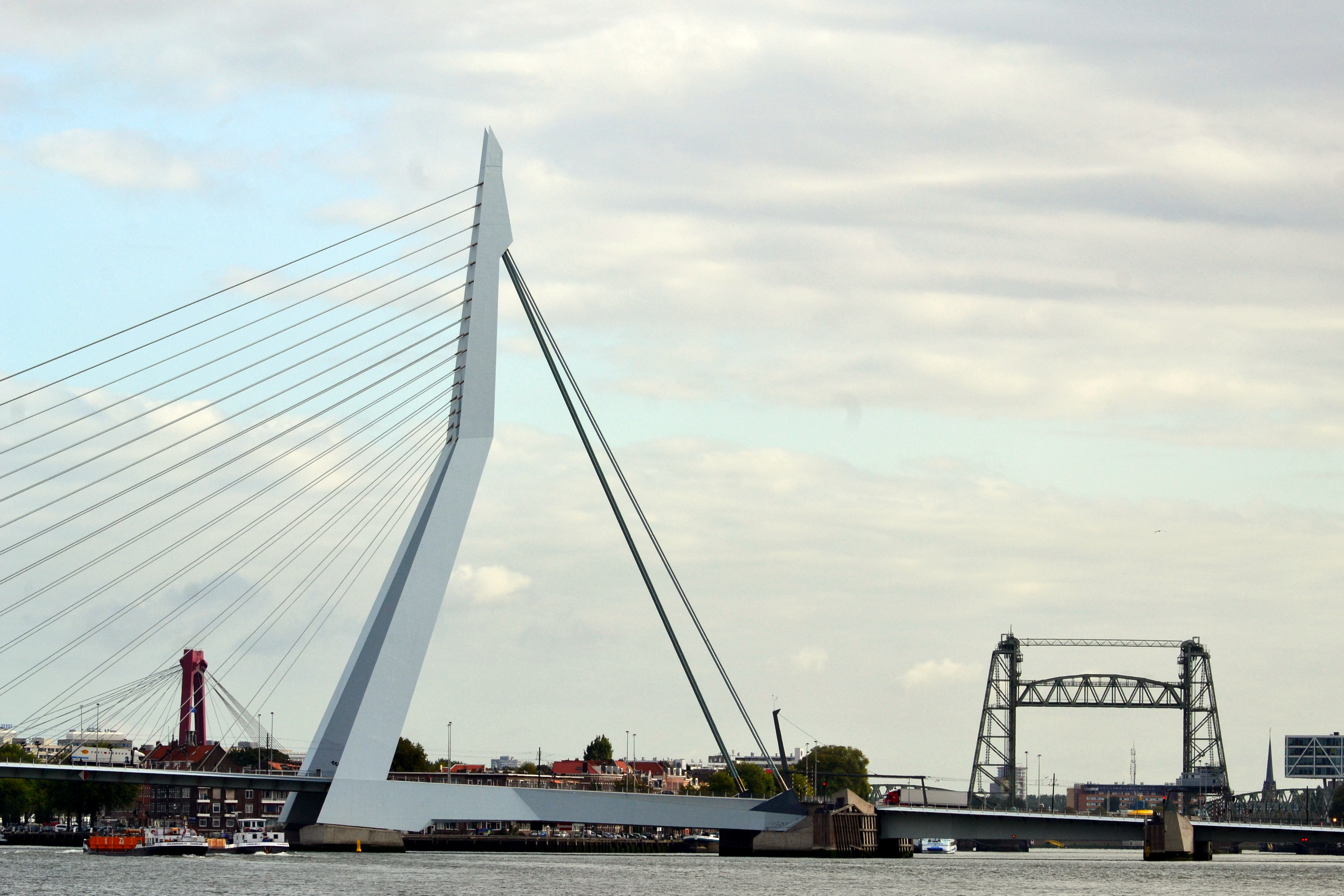
The bent pylon of the Erasmus Bridge with 16 pairs of front stay cables and 2 sets of back stay cables; back stay cables attached at the minimal height of the third front stay, limiting the cantilever of the upper front cables at the top of the pylon.

During the preliminary design process, many alternative designs were developed. In 1990, one of the review architects, Ben van Berkel, revealed his own design, which was similar to the one Santiago Calatrava used for the Alamillo Bridge in Sevilla, Spain: a single pylon positioned on one side of the river with a backward lean. Because the initially designed 150-m-high concrete bent pylon was to act as a counterweight for the 284-m span, the pylon had no back stays.

In the subsequent engineering feasibility study, a number of significant design changes were made. Most importantly, live loads, like 60-ton trucks, would introduce tremendous bending forces into the backward leaning pylon; therefore back stays were added to minimize bending forces. The 150-m-high concrete pylon was changed to a 139-m-high steel pylon. The overall appearance of the bridge design remained intact, however, which proved to be the decisive factor for its selection. In November 1991, the city council chose the highly ambitious backward leaning bent pylon shape and made available the necessary additional funds for the asymmetric bridge.

The Erasmus Bridge is the result of an unusual design process in which architects and engineers interacted as equals. In the end this resulted in a bridge that evidences a full commitment to both technical and aesthetic standards.

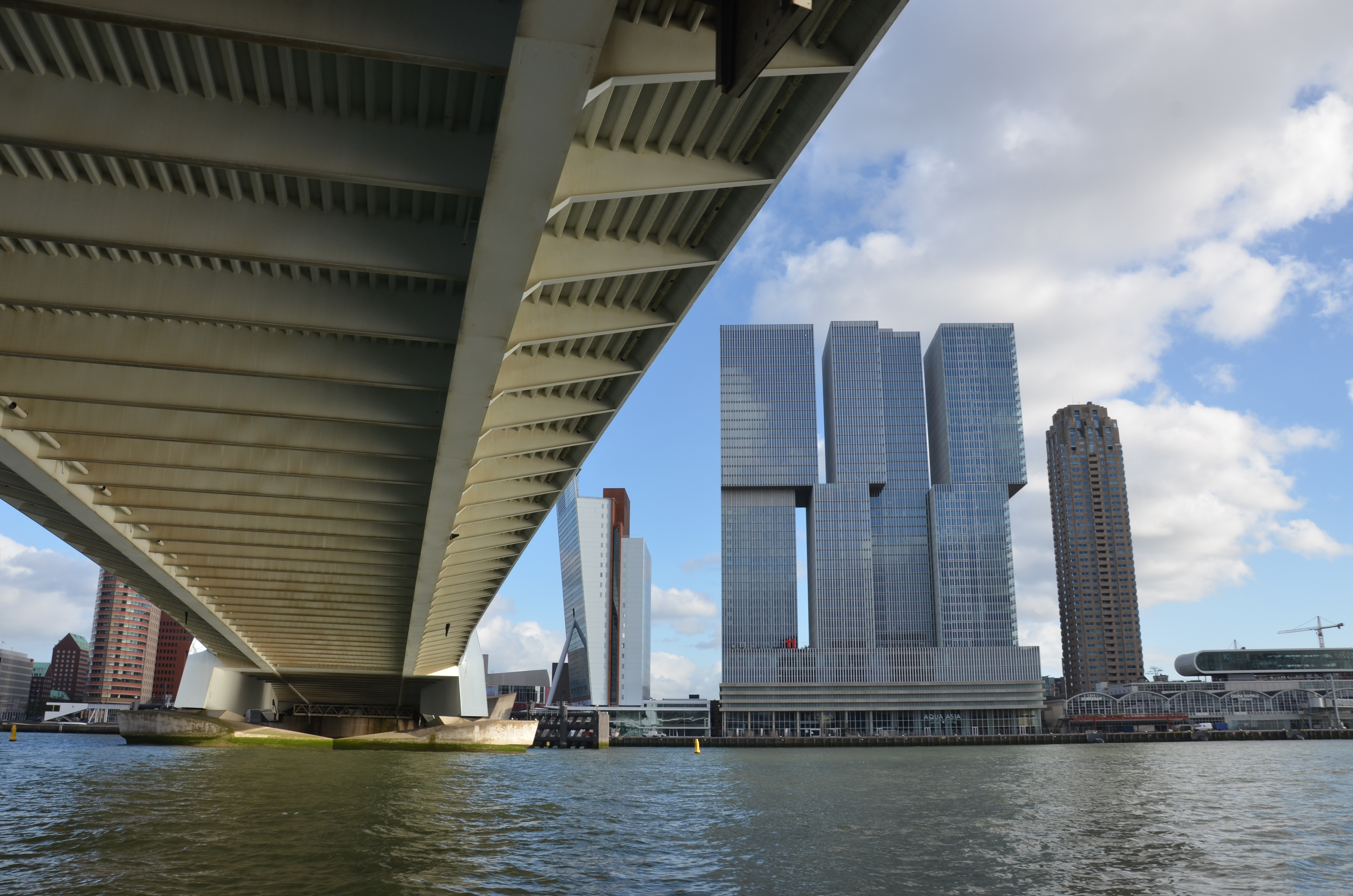
Two box girder spines & transverse sections under the deck of the Erasmus bridge. The three tall buildings to the right that have views of the bridge are the KPN Tower, De Rotterdam, and the New Orleans.

The thin deck profile was not only aesthetically motivated, but also dictated by a number of technical conditions, e.g., there needed to be a clear shipping height of 12.5 meters in the centre of the span for at least 200 meters. The deck was thus designed with two box girder spines, 2.25 meters high by 1.25 meters wide, where the cables were attached to support a deck with four traffic lanes and two tram tracks in between the two spines. The two spines were joined every 4.9 meters by transverse sections, which were cantilevered out 6.7 meters either side for the pedestrian and cycle ways.

On the concrete piers, the engineers designed the steel tubes within the concrete piers to support the bridge and the architects designed the concrete form around these inner steel tubes as a sculptural form.

== Use in events ==
The bridge featured in the 1998 Jackie Chan film Who Am I?. In 2005, several planes flew underneath the bridge as part of the "Red Bull Air Race". The bridge is also part of The World Port Days in Rotterdam.

In 2005, the bridge served as the backdrop for a performance by DJ Tiësto titled "Tiësto @ The Bridge, Rotterdam". The performance featured fire-fighting ships spraying jets of water into the air in front of the bridge, a fireworks barge launching fireworks beside the bridge, and multi colored spot/search lights attached to the bridge itself.

The bridge was crossed during the prologue and the opening stage of the 2010 Tour de France and during the second stage of the 2015 edition of the Tour. The bridge was also crossed during the 2024 Tour de France Femmes.

The bridge features during an interval act at the Eurovision Song Contest 2021 in the grand final by Dutch DJ Afrojack called "Music Binds Us".

== Gallery ==
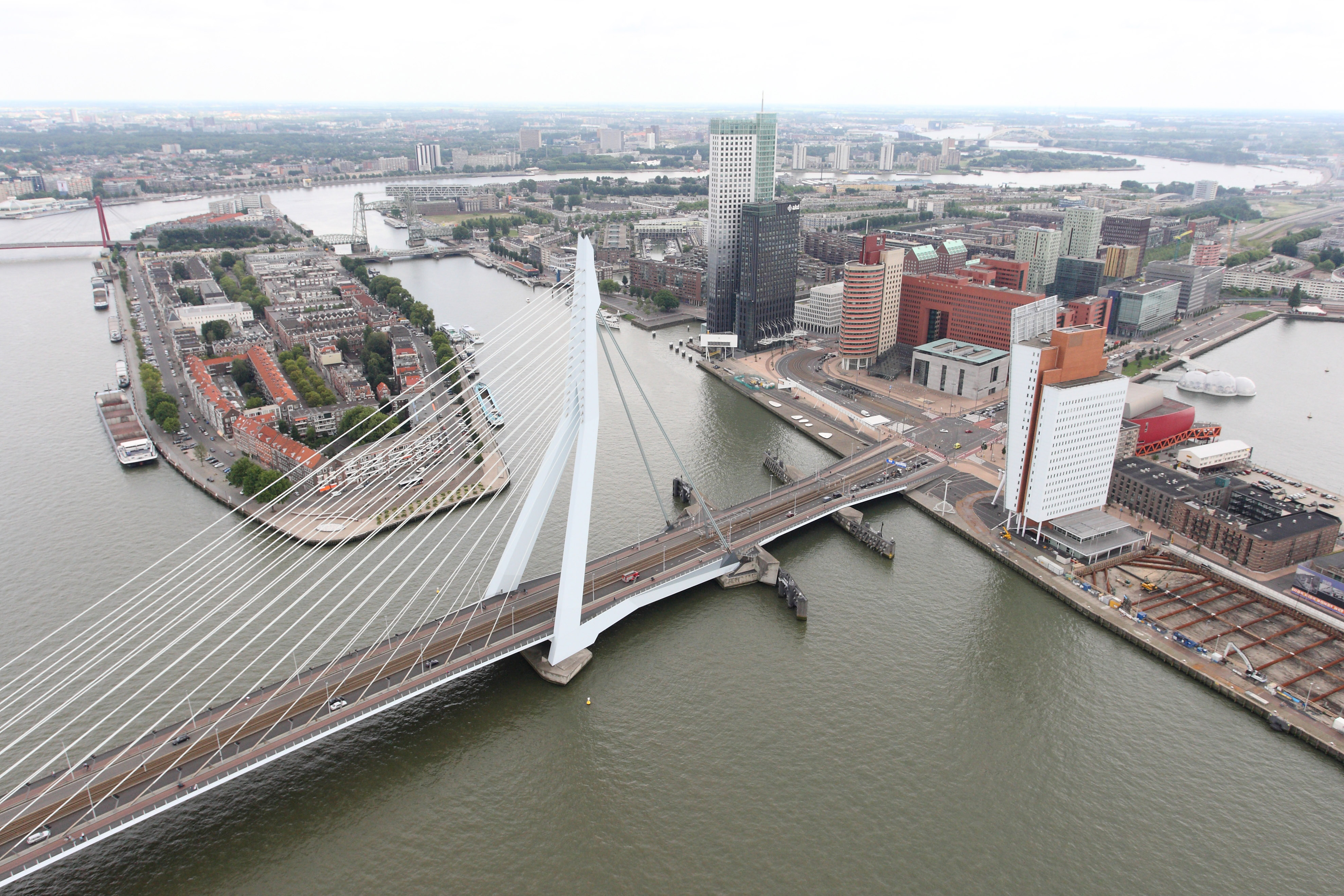
Erasmusbrug: cable-stayed and bascule bridge

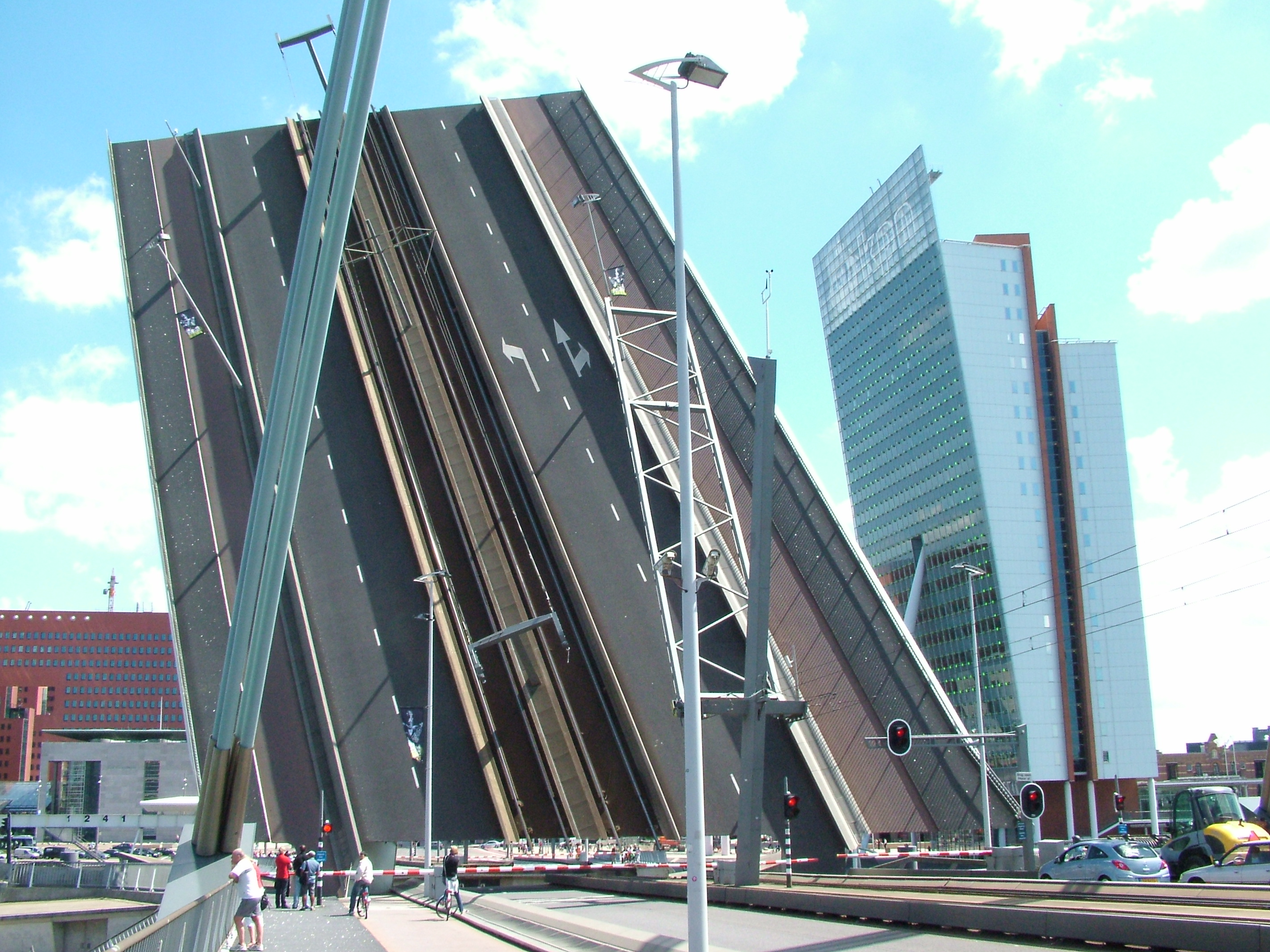
The bascule section raised, one set of back stay cables in left foreground

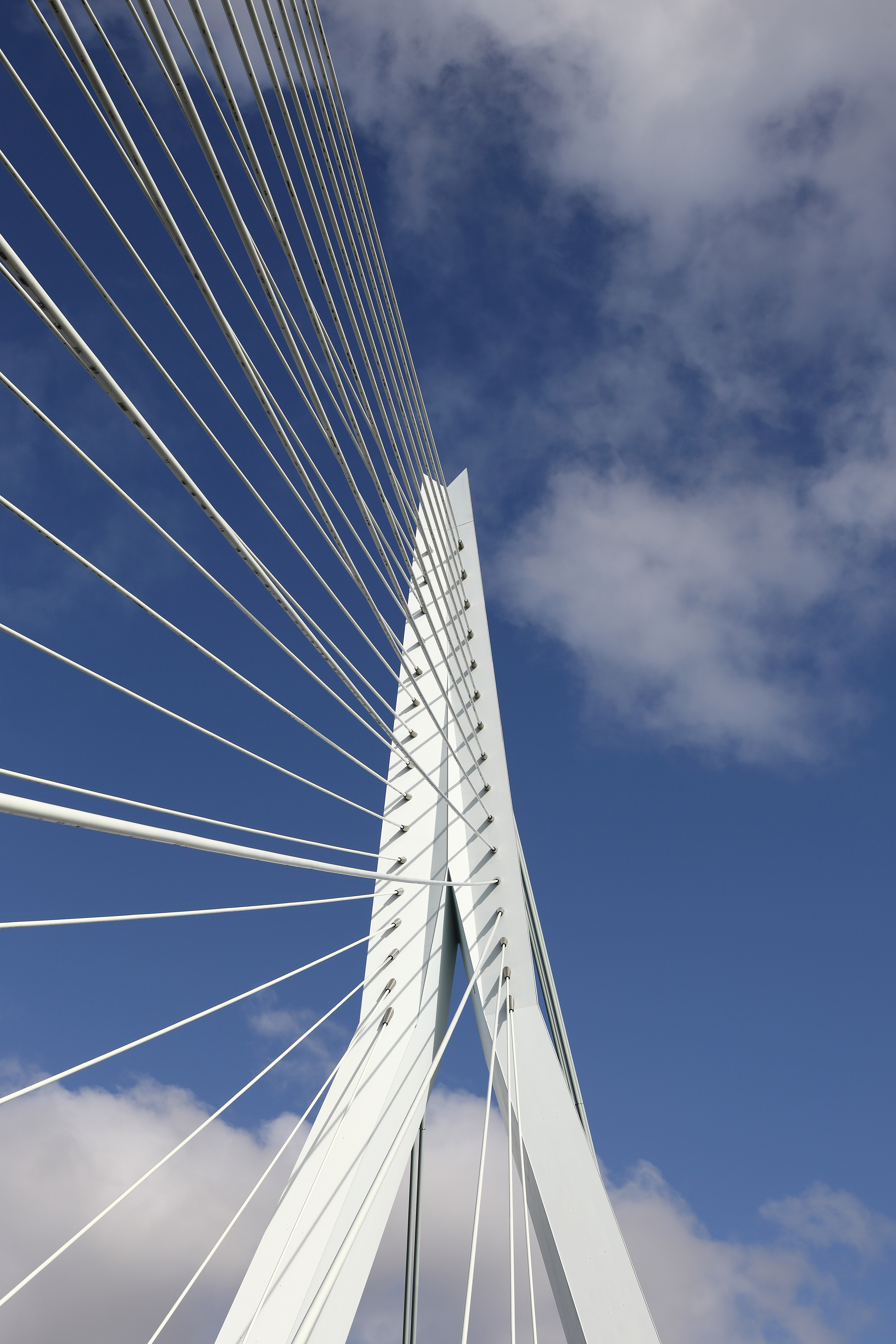
Detail of pylon from the bridge

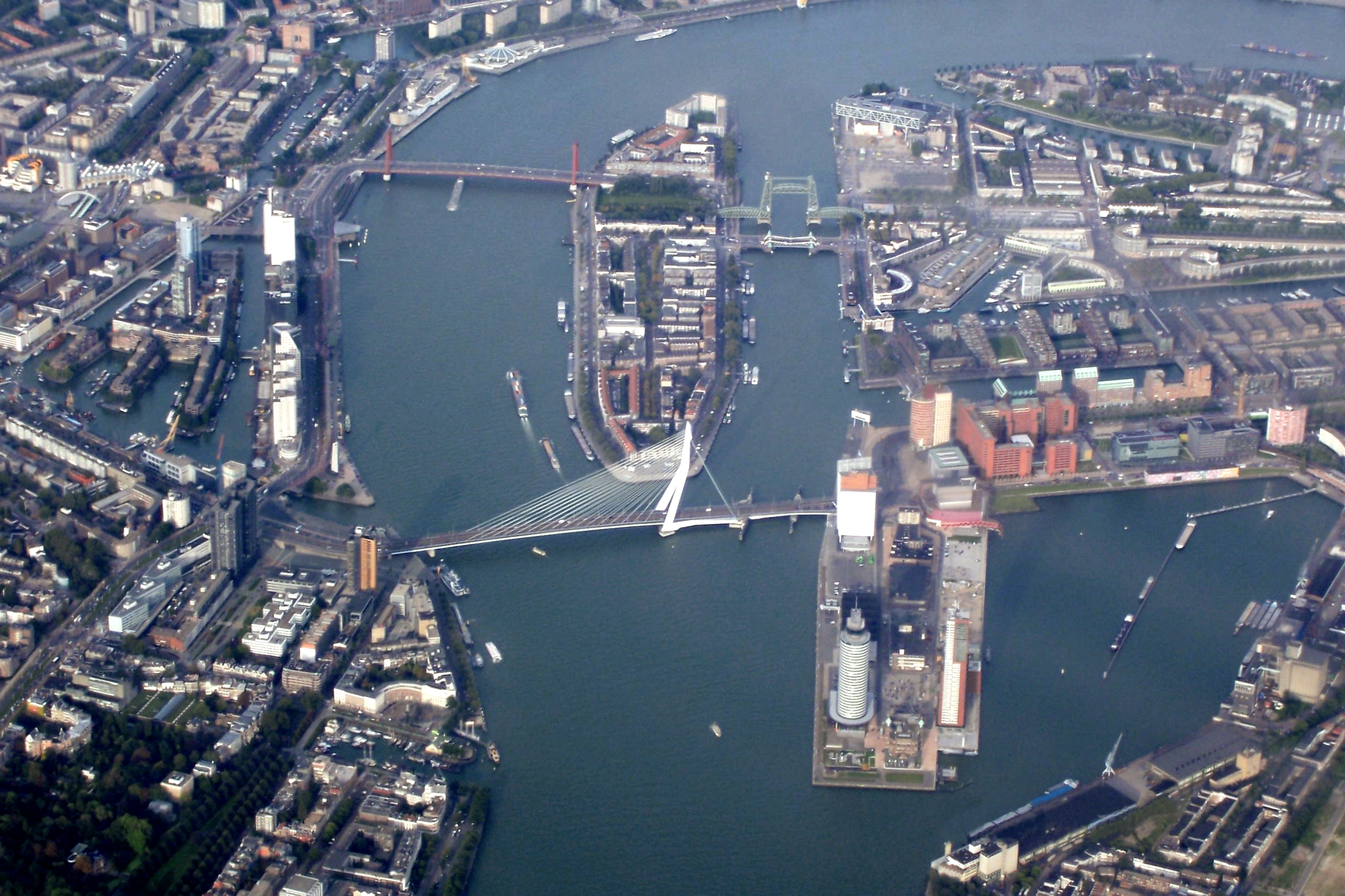
Rotterdam Erasmusbrug from above looking east

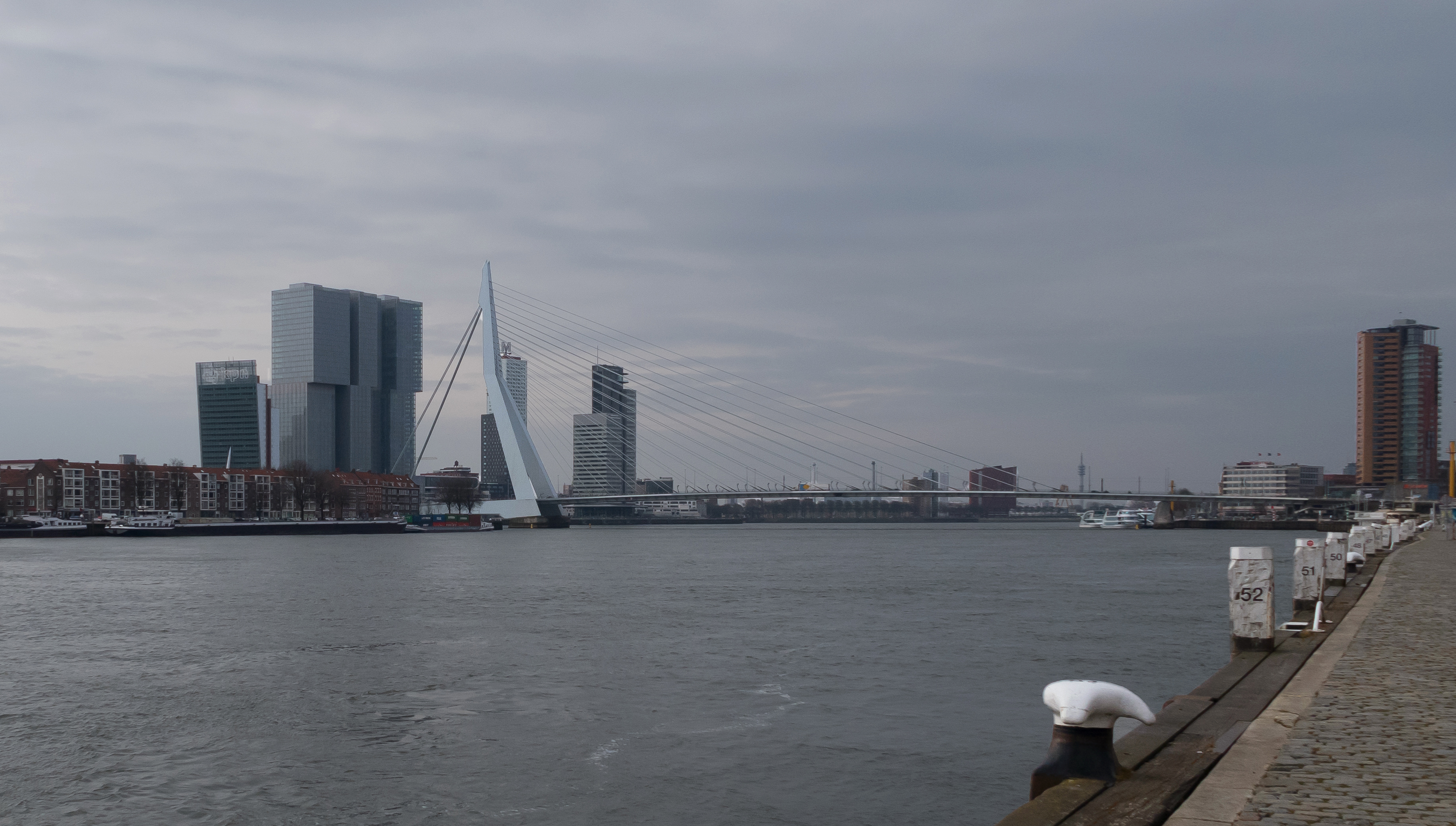
Erasmus Bridge from the east

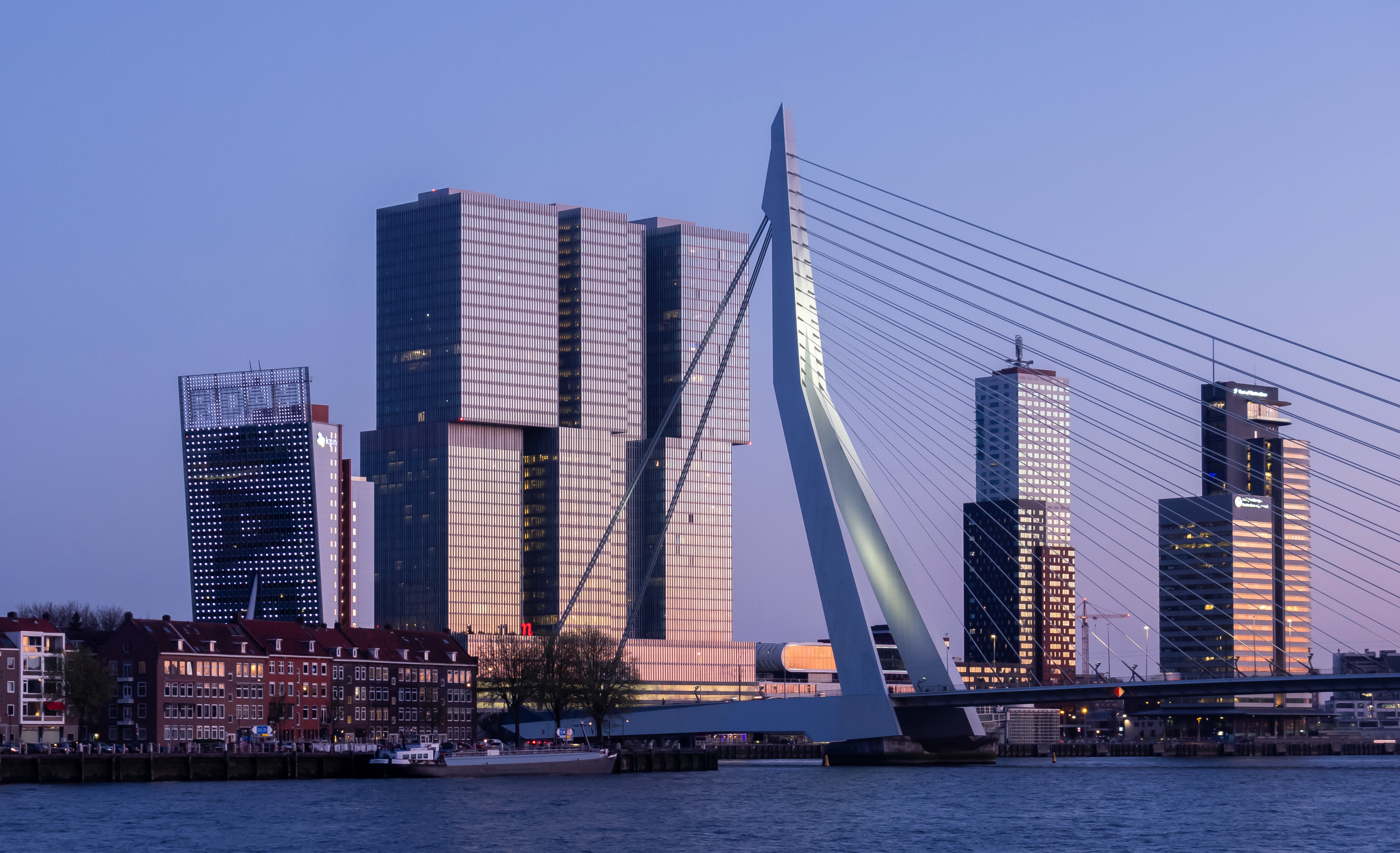
Erasmus Bridgebrug and the Kop van Zuid

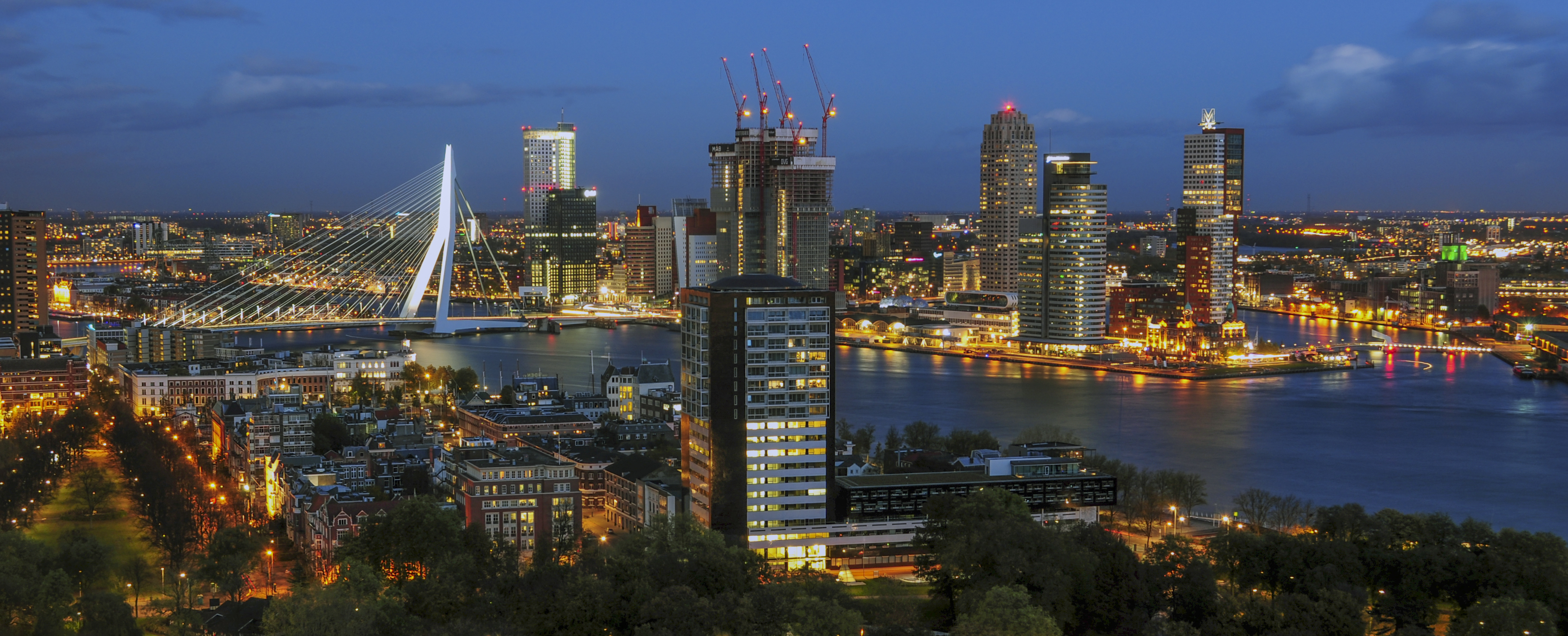
Erasmus Bridge at night seen from the Euromast in 2012
