= New Orleans (Rotterdam) =

45-storey, 158.4 m (519 ft) residential skyscraper in Rotterdam, Netherlands

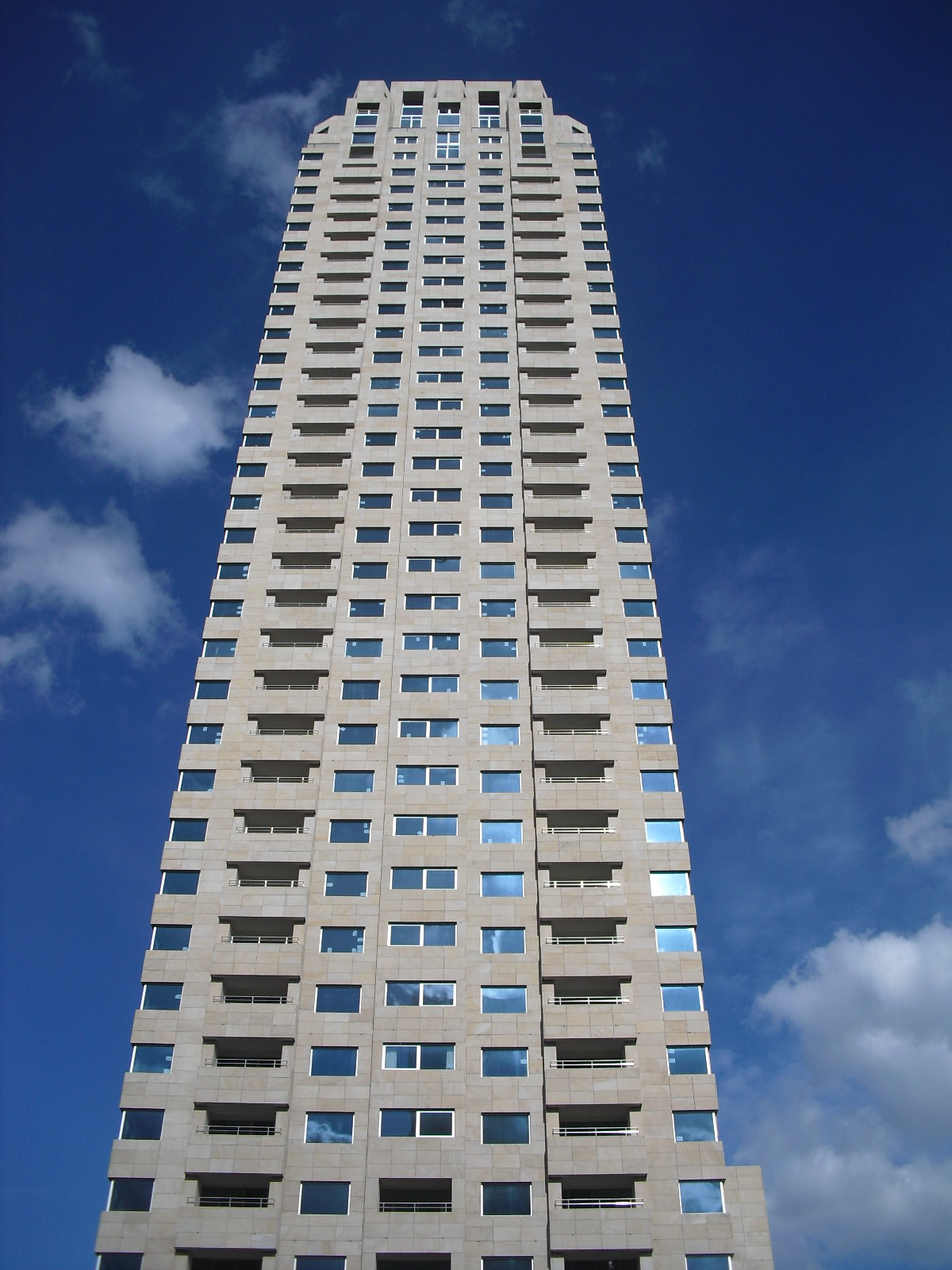
- Interactive map of the New Orleans area

General information
- Status: Completed
- Type: Residential
- Architectural style: Modernism
- Location: Otto Reuchlinweg; Rotterdam, Netherlands
- Coordinates: 51.90516°N 4.48791°E
- Completed: 2007 – 2010

Height
- Antenna spire: 163 m (535 ft)
- Roof: 158.4 m (520 ft)

Technical details
- Floor count: 45
- Floor area: 42,750 m^{2} (460,200 sq ft)
- Lifts/elevators: 3

Design and construction
- Architect: Álvaro Siza Vieira
- Developer: TRS Ontwikkeling; Vesteda
- Engineer: D3BN; Deerns Raadgevende Ingenieurs; DHV
- Main contractor: Besix

Other information
- Number of units: 238

New Orleans is a 45-storey, 158.4 m (520 ft) residential skyscraper in Rotterdam, Netherlands, designed by Álvaro Siza Vieira. It was the tallest residential building (and second tallest building overall) in the Netherlands, until completion of the De Zalmhaven in 2022. Consist of residential area with swimming pool, saunas and gym for residents as well as commercial area with cinema LantarenVenster.

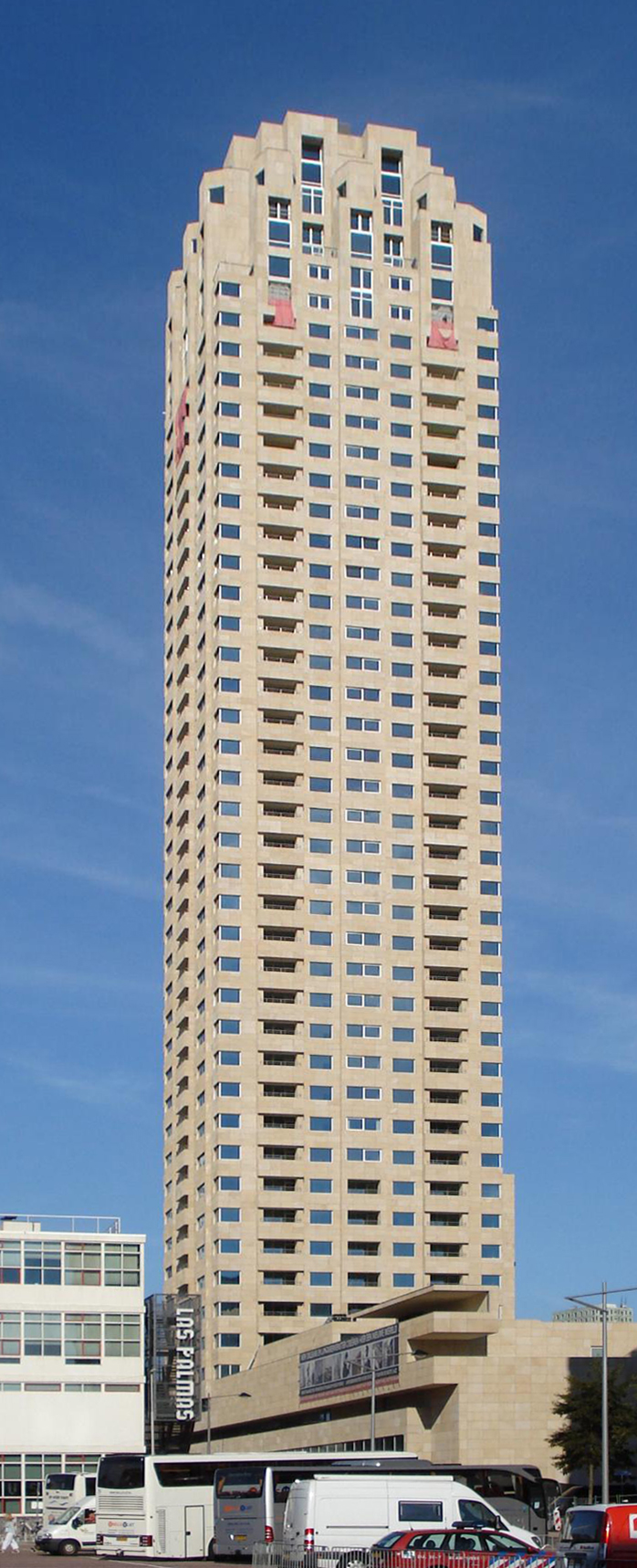

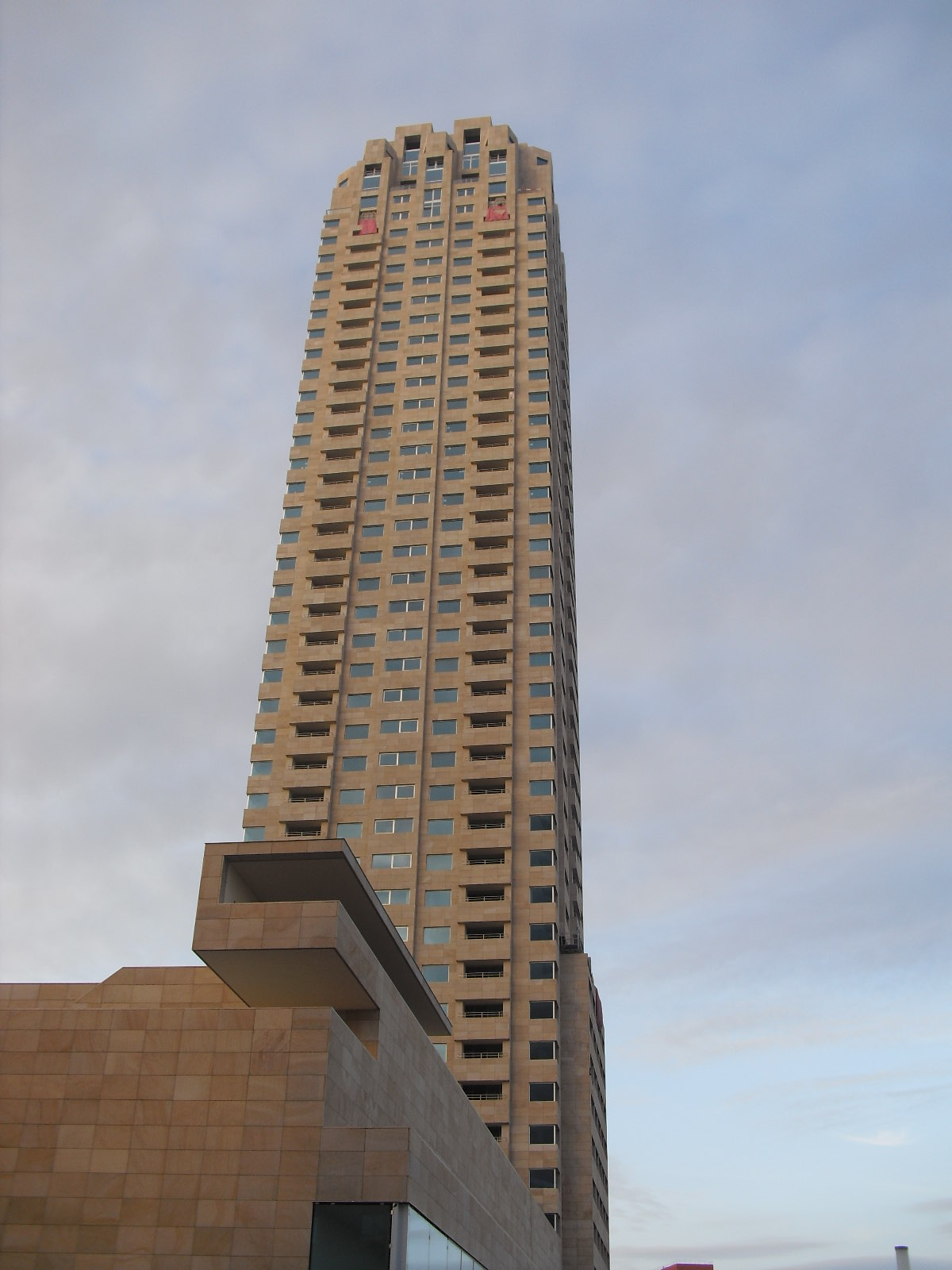

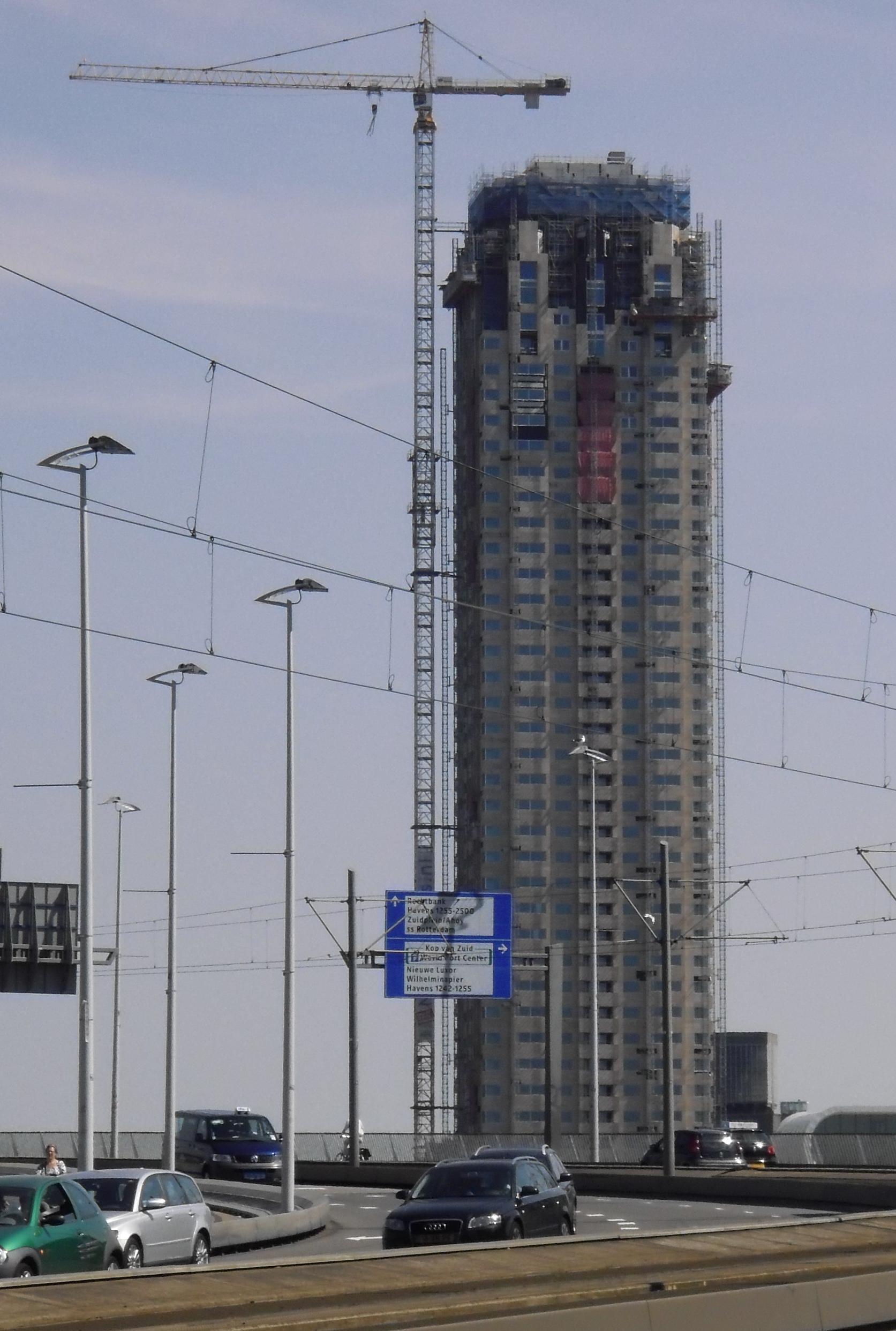
