= KPN Tower =

Office building in Rotterdam, the Netherlands

Coordinates: 51.907°N 4.489°E

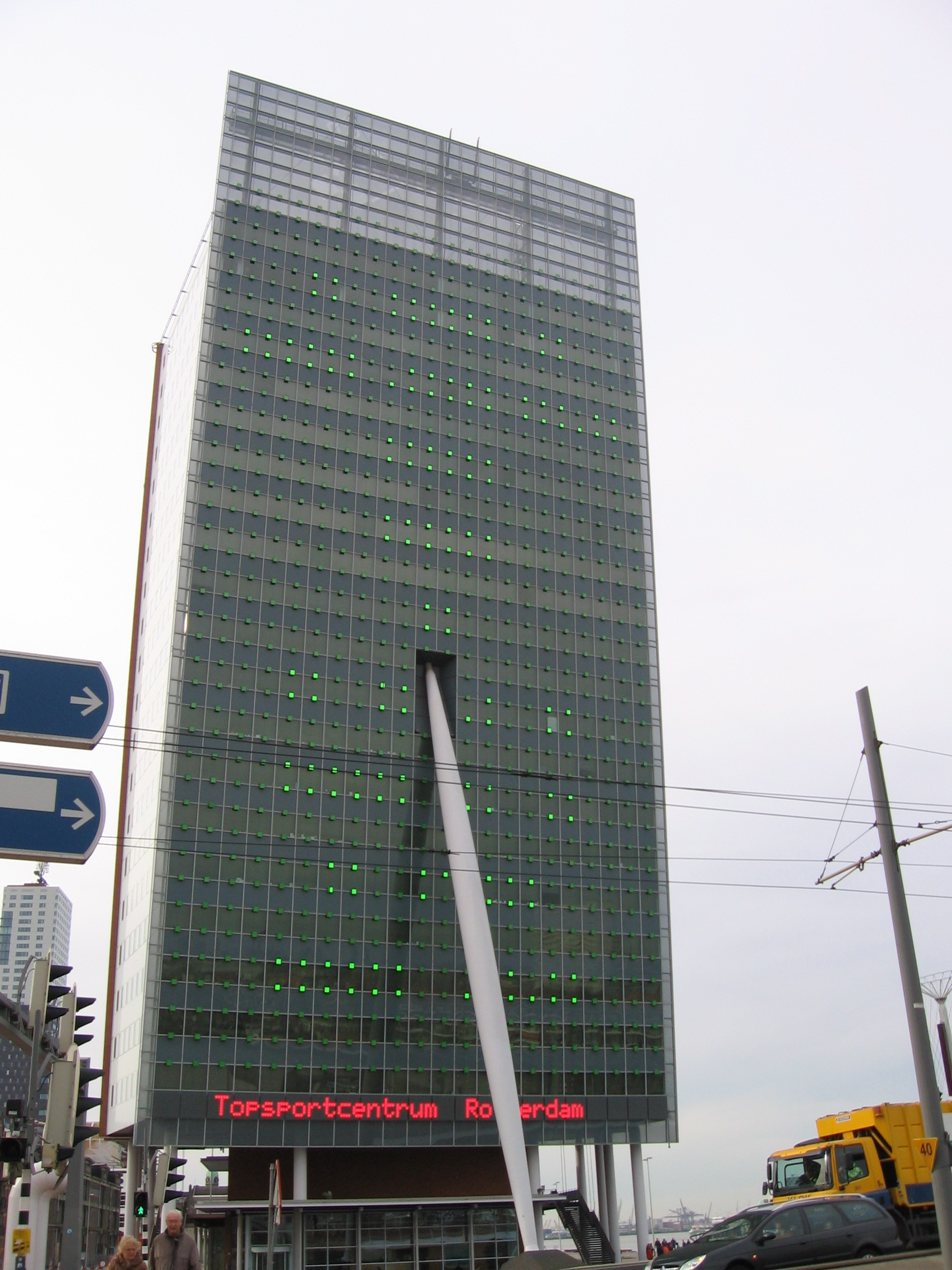
Tower on South (nl:Toren op Zuid)

KPN Tower is a 96.5-metre-tall (317 ft) office building in Rotterdam (a city in the Netherlands). It was designed by Italian architect Renzo Piano and construction began in 1998. The building was officially opened by its owner KPN on September 28, 2000. The concept and design of the motion graphic light installation is from Studio Dumbar.
