= Timeline of Rotterdam =

The following is a timeline of the history of the municipality of Rotterdam, Netherlands.

== Prior to 19th century ==
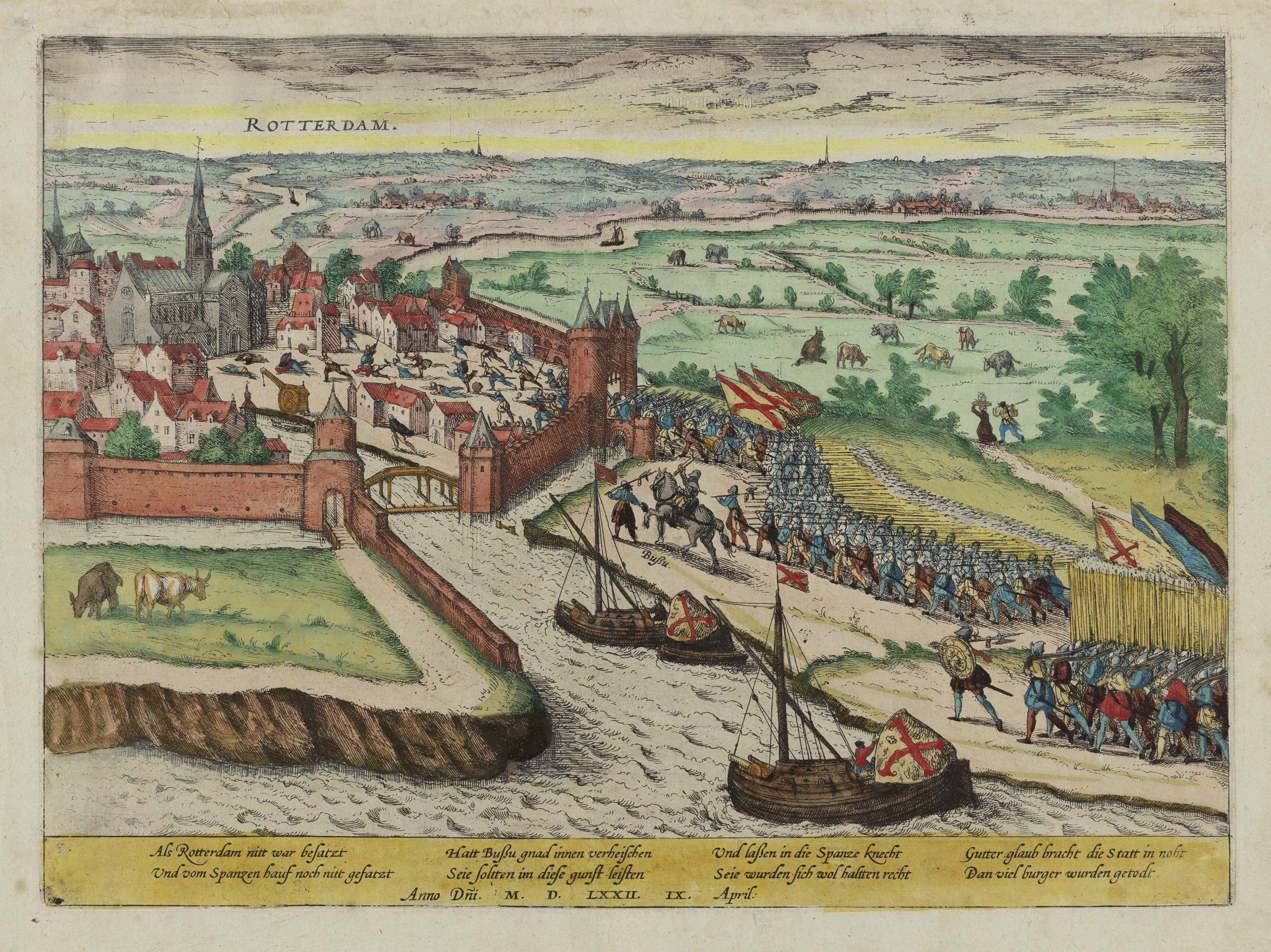
In 1572 Rotterdam was plundered by the Spanish troops of Count Bossu

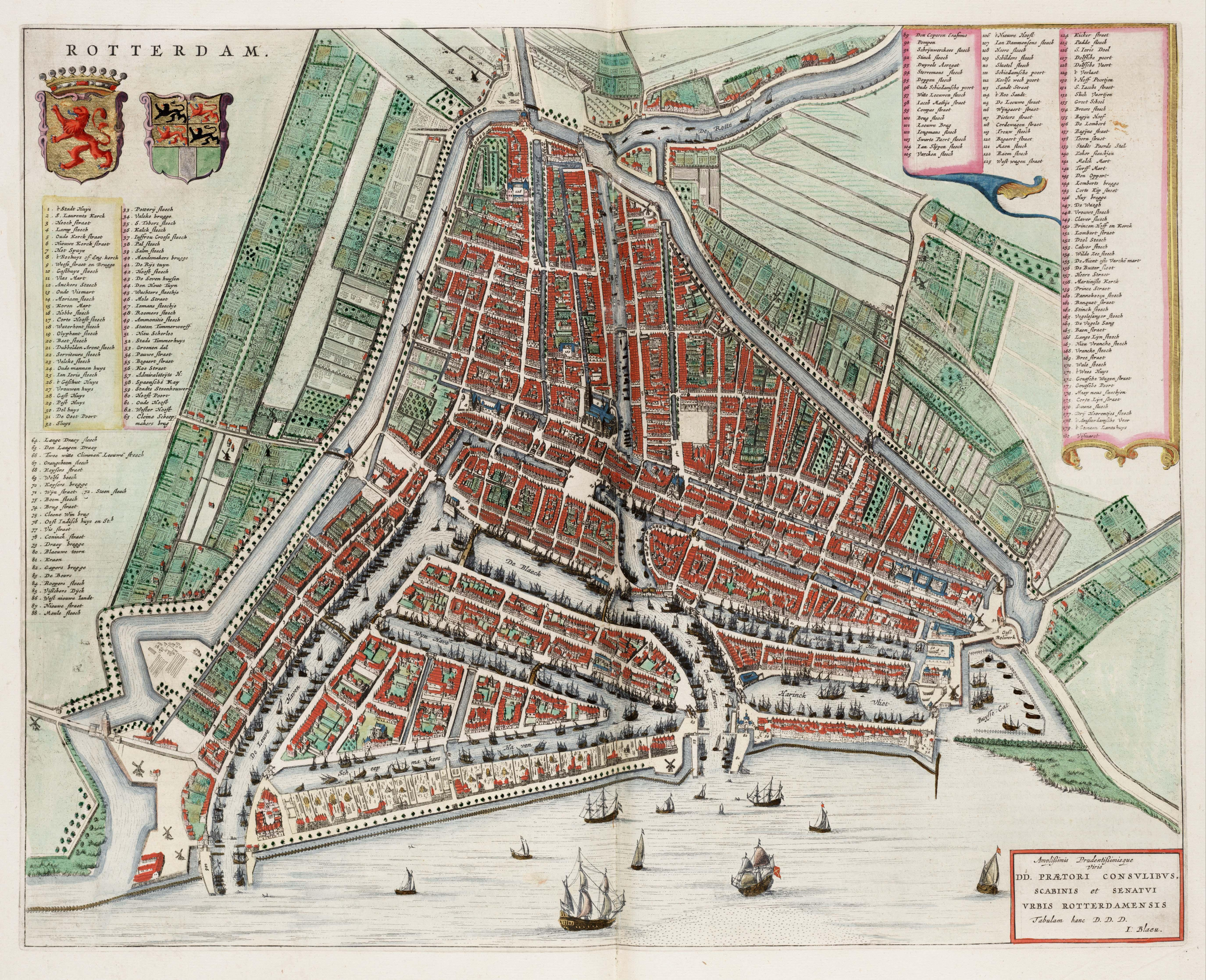
Map of Rotterdam, 1649

- ca. 950 - Settlement at the lower end of the fen stream Rotte
- 1270 - Dam built on Rotte.
- 1299 - John I, Count of Holland granted rights to the people of Rotterdam, marking the origin of the town.
- 1328 - Latin school established
- 1340 - City rights granted by William IV, Count of Holland.
- 1350 - Rotterdamse Schie (canal) constructed (approximate date).
- 1466 - Erasmus, philosopher and Catholic theologian born.
- 1477 - Saint Lawrence Church consecrated.
- 1489 - Rotterdam besieged by forces of Frans van Brederode.
- 1563 - Fire.
- 1572 - Spanish in power.
- 1574 - Admiralty of Rotterdam organized.
- 1611 - Guild of Saint Luke active (approximate date).
- 1622 - Erasmus statue by Hendrick de Keyser erected.
- 1626 - Collegium Mechanicum established.
- 1632 - Population: 20,000 (approximate).
- 1643 - Scottish Presbyterian church built.
- 1722 - Exchange built.
- 1769 - Batavian Society for Experimental Philosophy founded.
- 1773 - Studium Scientiarum Genetrix literary society formed.
- 1780 - Birth of Hendrik Tollens, poet.
- 1781 - Rotterdamse Academie established.
- 1796 - Population: 53,212.
- 1797 - Netherlands Missionary Society founded.
- 1798 - Organ installed in Saint Lawrence Church.

== 19th century ==
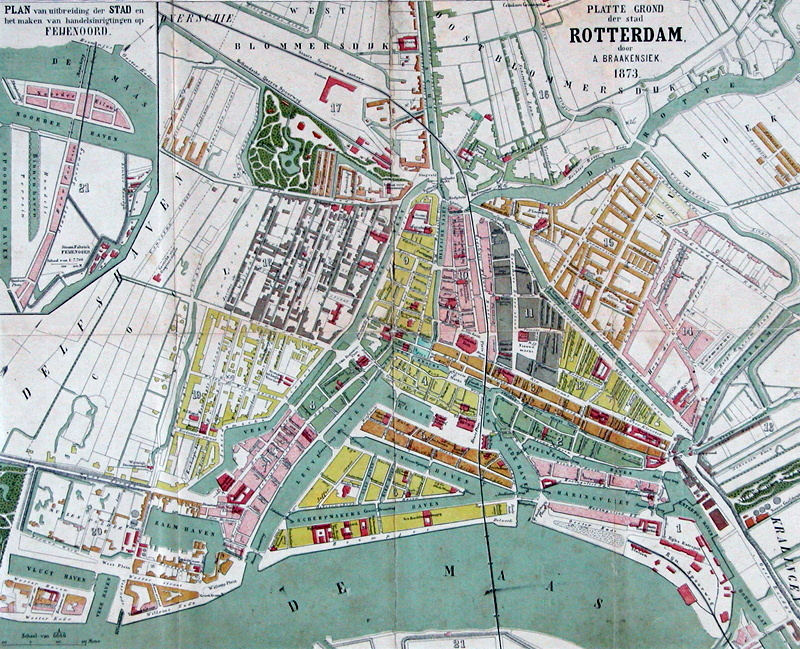
Plan of Rotterdam in 1873 with plan of expansion

- 1813 - Johan François van Hogendorp van Heeswijk becomes mayor.
- 1835 - Town Hall rebuilt.
- 1838 - Population: 72,000.
- 1844 - Nieuwe Rotterdamsche Courant begins publication.
- 1847 - Delftsche Poort railway station opens.
- 1849 - Boymans Museum opens.
- 1851 - Royal Maas Yacht Club founded.
- 1857 - Zoo opens.
- 1859 - Rotterdamsch Leeskabinet (library) founded.
- 1863 - Rotterdam Bank established.
- 1866 - Population: 115,277.
- 1869 - Feijenoord becomes part of city.
- 1870 - Municipal waterworks established.
- 1872 - Nieuwe Waterweg constructed.
- 1873 - Netherlands-America Steamship Company in business.
- 1874
  - Katendrecht village becomes part of city.
  - Oldenzeel art gallery in business.
  - Fountain installed at Nieuwe Markt.
  - Maritime Museum founded.
- 1875
  - Post office built.
  - Koninklijke Rotterdamsche Lloyd shipping firm in business.
- 1876 - Rotterdamsche reinigingsdienst formed.
- 1877 - Railway Bridge, Rotterdam Zuid railway station, and Rotterdam Beurs railway station open.
- 1878 - Willemsbrug opens.
- 1879
  - Horsecar trams begin operating.
  - Passage (arcade) built.
- 1882 - Fish Market built.
- 1885 - Museum for Geography and Ethnology opens.
- 1886 - Delfshaven becomes part of city.
- 1891 - Population: 203,500.
- 1894 - Municipal gas and electricity established.
- 1895 - Charlois and Kralingen become part of city.
- 1898 - Witte Huis built.
- 1900 - "Record office" established.

== 20th century ==
- 1904
  - Museum van Oudheden (city history museum) in operation in the Schielandshuis.
  - Schiecentrale built.
- 1905
  - Electric trams begin operating.
  - Population: 379,017.
- 1908
  - Rotterdam Hofplein railway station opens.
  - Wilhelmina football club formed.
- 1913 - Netherlands School of Commerce founded.
- 1920 - Voorwaarts newspaper begins publication.
- 1925 - Economic Faculty Association established.
- 1927 - Natural History Museum established.
- 1930
  - Rotterdam Philharmonic Orchestra active.
  - Naamlooze Vennootschap Margarine Unie in business.
  - Rotterdams Conservatorium founded.
- 1931
  - Rotterdamse Dansschool founded.
  - Van Nelle Factory built.
- 1934
  - Hoogvliet and Pernis become part of city.
  - De Doelen (concert hall and convention centre) built.
- 1937
  - Stadion Feijenoord and Rotterdam Stadion railway station open.
  - Museum of Taxation founded.
- 1938
  - Pieter Oud becomes mayor.
  - Yevhen Konovalets is assassinated in Rotterdam by Pavel Sudoplatov.
- 1940
  - May 14: Rotterdam Blitz.
  - Diergaarde Blijdorp (zoo) re-opens.
- 1941 - Hillegersberg, IJsselmonde, Overschie, and Schiebroek become part of city.
- 1945 - Pieter Oud becomes mayor again.
- 1946
  - Plan for the Reconstruction of Rotterdam adopted.
  - Algemeen Dagblad begins publication.
- 1953
  - Rotterdam Blaak railway station and Rotterdam Noord railway station open.
  - Groothandelsgebouw built.
- 1956 - Airport opens.
- 1957 - Rotterdam Centraal railway station opens.
- 1958 - Arboretum Trompenburg opens.
- 1960
  - Euromast tower built.
  - City hosts Floriade horticulture exhibition.
- 1962 - Port of Rotterdam ranked world's busiest port by cargo tonnage.
- 1964
  - Rotterdam Lombardijen railway station opens.
  - Hilton Hotel built.
- 1965 - Regional Rinjmond Public Authority created.
- 1966 - De Doelen (concert hall and convention centre) rebuilt.
- 1968 - Rotterdam Metro begins operating.
- 1969 - Rotterdam Alexander railway station opens.
- 1970
  - Poetry International first performance.
  - NRC Handelsblad begins publication, after the merger between Nieuwe Rotterdamsche Courant and Algemeen Handelsblad
  - Nedlloyd shipping firm in business.
  - Kralingen Music Festival held.
- 1972 International Film Festival Rotterdam first started.
- 1973
  - Charlois, Hoogvliet, and Hoek van Holland sub-municipalities created.
  - Maasvlakte in operation.
- 1974 - André van der Louw becomes mayor.
- 1975
  - Prins Alexander sub-municipality created.
  - Werkcentrum Dans founded.
- 1976
  - IJsselmonde and Centrum Noord sub-municipalities created.
  - Stoom Stichting Nederland railway museum founded.
- 1977 - Sviib (student association) organized.
- 1979 - HNLMS Buffel museum ship opens.
- 1981
  - Rotterdam Marathon begins.
  - Baroeg (music venue) in business.
- 1982 - Bram Peper becomes mayor.
- 1984
  - Zomercarnaval begins.
  - Cube houses built near Oude Haven.
- 1986 - Port of Rotterdam ranked world's busiest container port.
- 1988 - Hogeschool Rotterdam established.
- 1990 - Witte de With Center for Contemporary Art and Shipping and Transport College established.
- 1991 - Gebouw Delftse Poort built.
- 1992 - Kunsthal art museum opens.
- 1993
  - Netherlands Architecture Institute relocates to Rotterdam.
  - Chabot Museum opens.
- 1994 - V2 Institute for the Unstable Media active.
- 1996
  - Erasmus Bridge opens.
  - Schouwburgplein (square) redesigned.
- 1997 - MAMA project established by Public Art Squad Foundation.
- 1999
  - Ivo Opstelten becomes mayor.
  - WORM (Rotterdam) active.
- 2000
  - Architecture Film Festival Rotterdam begins.
  - Codarts University for the Arts opens.
  - KPN Tower built.

== 21st century ==
Map of Rotterdam (2009)

- 2001
  - World Port Center built.
  - Oceanium (aquarium) opens.
  - City designated a European Capital of Culture.
- 2002 - Regio Randstad regional governance group formed.
- 2003 - Netherlands Photo Museum opens.
- 2005 - Montevideo (residential skyscraper) built.
- 2006
  - North Sea Jazz Festival begins in Rotterdam.
  - Rotterdam Circus Arts founded.
- 2007
  - RandstadRail and Betuweroute in operation.
  - Junior Eurovision Song Contest 2007 held.
- 2009
  - Ahmed Aboutaleb becomes first Muslim mayor of a major European city.
  - Maastoren skyscraper built.
- 2010
  - Rozenburg becomes part of city.
  - Pernis sub-municipality created.
  - New Orleans (residential skyscraper) built.
  - 2010 Tour de France cycling race starts from Rotterdam.
- 2012 - Population: 616,250.
- 2013 Maasvlakte 2 in operation.
- 2014
  - Market Hall built.
  - Rotterdam Centraal station in operation.
- 2020 - Population: 651,376
- 2021
  - Depot Museum Boijmans Van Beuningen.
  - De Zalmhaven built.
  - Floating Office Rotterdam (FOR) built, accommodating the Global Center on Adaptation.
  - Eurovision Song Contest 2021 held.

== See also ==
- History of Rotterdam
- List of mayors of Rotterdam
- List of churches in Rotterdam
- List of national monuments in Rotterdam
- Timelines of other municipalities in the Netherlands: Amsterdam, Breda, Delft, Eindhoven, Groningen, Haarlem, The Hague, 's-Hertogenbosch, Leiden, Maastricht, Nijmegen, Utrecht

== Bibliography ==
In English

- Thomas Nugent (1749), "Rotterdam", The Grand Tour, vol. 1: Netherlands, London: S. Birt, hdl:2027/mdp.39015030762598
- "Rotterdam". Gazetteer of the Netherlands. Attributed to Clement Cruttwell. London: G.G.J. and J. Robinson. 1794.
- "Rotterdam". Galignani's Traveller's Guide through Holland and Belgium (4th ed.). Paris: A. and W. Galignani. 1822. hdl:2027/njp.32101073846667.
- "Rotterdam" . Encyclopædia Britannica. Vol. 23 (11th ed.). 1910. p. 766.
- Frans Dieleman & Robert C. Kloosterman (2000). "Room to manoeuvre: governance, the post-industrial economy, and housing provision in Rotterdam". In Mario Polèse & Richard E. Stren (eds.). The Social Sustainability of Cities: Diversity and the Management of Change. University of Toronto Press. ISBN 978-0-8020-8320-3.
- Anton Kreukels; et al., eds. (2005). "Rotterdam". Metropolitan Governance and Spatial Planning: Comparative Case Studies of European City-Regions. Routledge. ISBN 978-1-134-49606-8.
- Stefan Couperus (2016). "Building Democracy Anew: Neighborhood Planning and Political Reform in Post-Blitz Rotterdam". Journal of Urban History. 42.

In Dutch

- Abraham Jacob van der Aa (1847). "Rotterdam". Aardrijkskundig woordenboek der Nederlanden [Geographical dictionary of the Netherlands] (in Dutch). Vol. 9. Gorinchem: Jacobus Noorduyn. hdl:2027/mdp.39015039364024 – via HathiTrust.
- Rotterdam in den loop der eeuwen [Rotterdam in the course of ages] (in Dutch). Rotterdam: W. Nevens. 1906.
- Henri Zondervan, ed. (1921), "Rotterdam", Winkler Prins' Geillustreerde Encyclopaedie (in Dutch), vol. 14 (4th ed.), Amsterdam: Uitgevers-Maatschappy „Elsevier“, hdl:2027/mdp.39015068347924
