= List of architecture film festivals =

This is a list of major architecture film festivals, sorted by continent.

== South America ==
| | Est. | City | Country | Type | Notes |
|---|---|---|---|---|---|
| Arquitectura Film Festival - ArqFilmFest | 2012 | Santiago | Chile | International | ArqFilmFest was born in 2012 as the first film festival about film and architecture in Chile and Latin America. Through cinema, ArqFilmFest provides a space to promote the understanding, reflection, debate and communication about architecture, the city and urban. With these topics, ArqFilmFest reaches new audiences and promotes the production and exchange of film material across Chile and the world. |

== Africa ==
| | Est. | City | Country | Type | Notes |
|---|---|---|---|---|---|
| Architect Africa Film Festival | 2007 | Johannesburg, Durban, Cape Town, Bloemfontein and Port Elizabeth | South Africa | International | The Architect Africa Film Festival screens films about built environments or urban landscapes or anything to do with modern city life. The films vary in length from short films to feature length, they can be documentaries or fictional narratives. |

== Europe ==
| | Est. | City | Country | Type | Notes | Date |
|---|---|---|---|---|---|---|
| Architecture Film Festival Rotterdam | 2004 | Rotterdam | Netherlands | International | Architecture Film Festival Rotterdam (AFFR) is a biannual film festival screening films, shorts, animations and documentaries about architecture, urban development and city culture. | 7-11 October 2015 |
| Tilburg Architectuur Film Festival | 2015 | Tilburg | Netherlands | International | Tilburg Architectuur Film Festival (TIAFF) is an annual film festival screening films, shorts, animations and documentaries about architecture, landschape, urbansim, urban development and city culture. | 12-13 April 2019 |
| Beyond Media | 1997 | Florence | Italy | International | Beyond Media was an international architecture film festival that took place in Florence and ran from 1997 to 2009. | |
| Milano Design Film Festival | 2012 | Milan | Italy | International | History, current affairs, innovation. Art films and new directors. Research into the expressive codes of audiovisual language. A location in the heart of the city of design. | 24-27 October 2019 |
| Copenhagen Architecture Festival CAFx | 2014 | Copenhagen | Denmark | International | Presents architecture, in documentaries and portrait films, and looks at the relationships between architectural and cinematic space in classic and contemporary cinema. | 4-14 April 2019 |
