= André Gingras =

Canadian contemporary dancer (1966–2013)

- Born: 14 November 1966; Canada
- Died: 17 February 2013 (aged 46); Breda, Netherlands
- Occupations: Dancer; Choreographer
- Years active: 1992–2013
- Known for: Dance Works Rotterdam

André Gingras (14 November 1966 – 17 February 2013) was a Canadian contemporary dancer and one of the nation' most influential choreographers in recent times.

Gingras was born in Canada. He studied in Montreal, Toronto and New York together with Christopher Gillis, Doug Varone and Mariko Tanabe. His studies in Canada encompassed theatre, English literature and contemporary dance. He received a Canada Council Arts Award to pursue his dance education in New York City. In NYC he worked with Christopher Gillis, Doug Varone, and the Doris Humphrey Repertory Co. In 1996 Gingras became a regular member of Robert Wilson's creative team, developing and performing TSE, The Days Before, Prometheus, 70 Angels on the Facade and Relative Light among others, all over the world. Since 1996 he lived in Europe and the Netherlands. Gingras began his activities as a choreographer in the Netherlands in 1999. After an extensive career in dance and theatre, his desire to explore a highly physical and visual language began to manifest itself. His exploration of movement finds its inspiration in martial arts, freerunning, the physical symptoms related to specific medical conditions, and in post-modern dance and theatre. His desire is to interface dance with the visual and digital arts and to engage audiences in a dialogue based in contemporary issues.

Gingras' joining the company, Dance Works Rotterdam in 2010 led to a new phase in the artistic direction of that enterprise . Gingras created the ballet The Sweet Flesh Room for the Cadance Festival. In 2013 the Dance Works Rotterdam ceased functioning due to financial problems. Gingras died of cancer in his home in Breda on February 17, 2013. He was 46.
