= Schiecentrale =

National monument in Netherlands

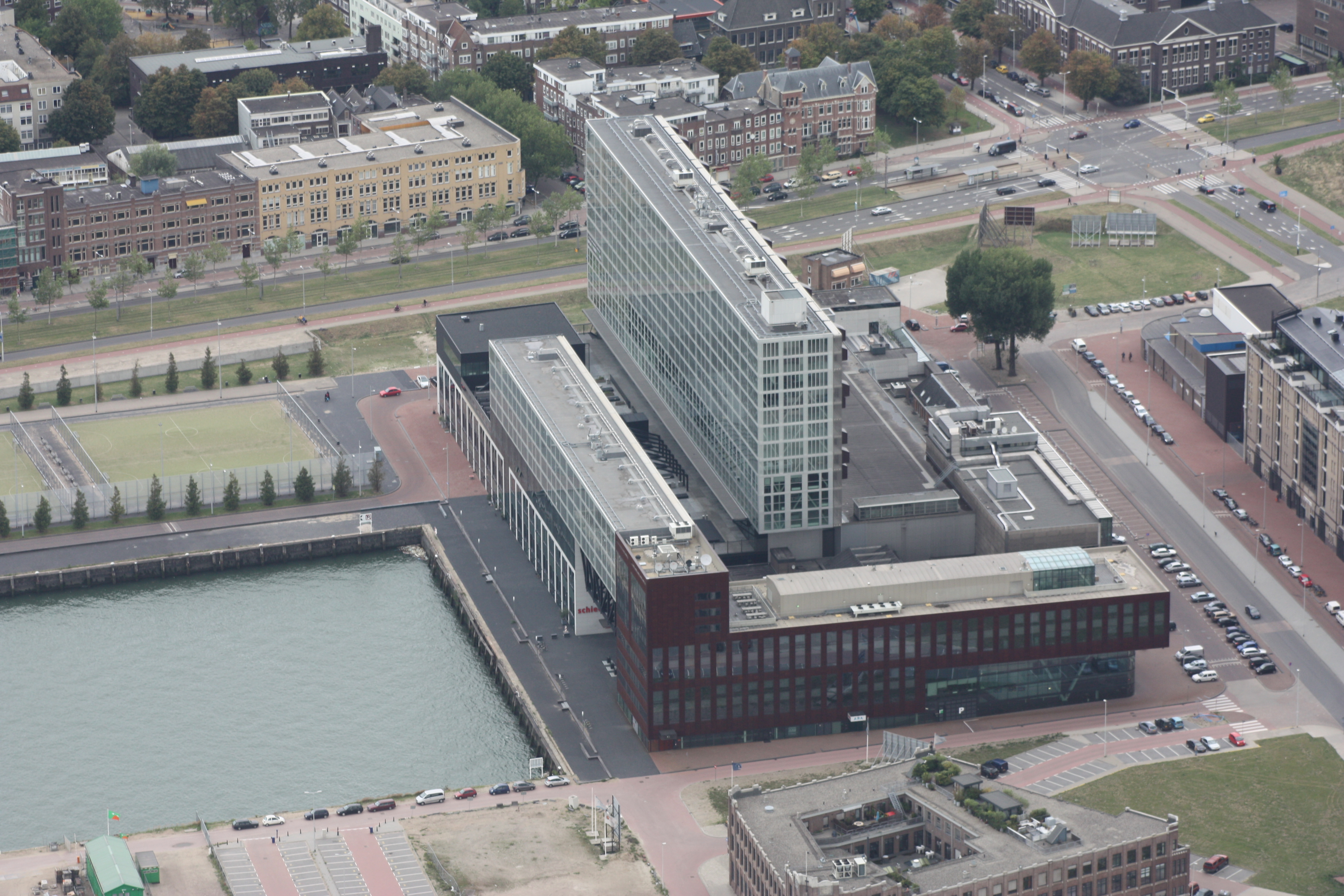
- West side of the complex
- Interactive map of the Schiecentrale area

General information
- Location: Lloydstraat 5, Rotterdam
- Coordinates: 51.90°N 4.45°E
- Construction started: 1904
- Renovated: 2008

Renovating team
- Architect: Robert Winkel (Mei Architects)

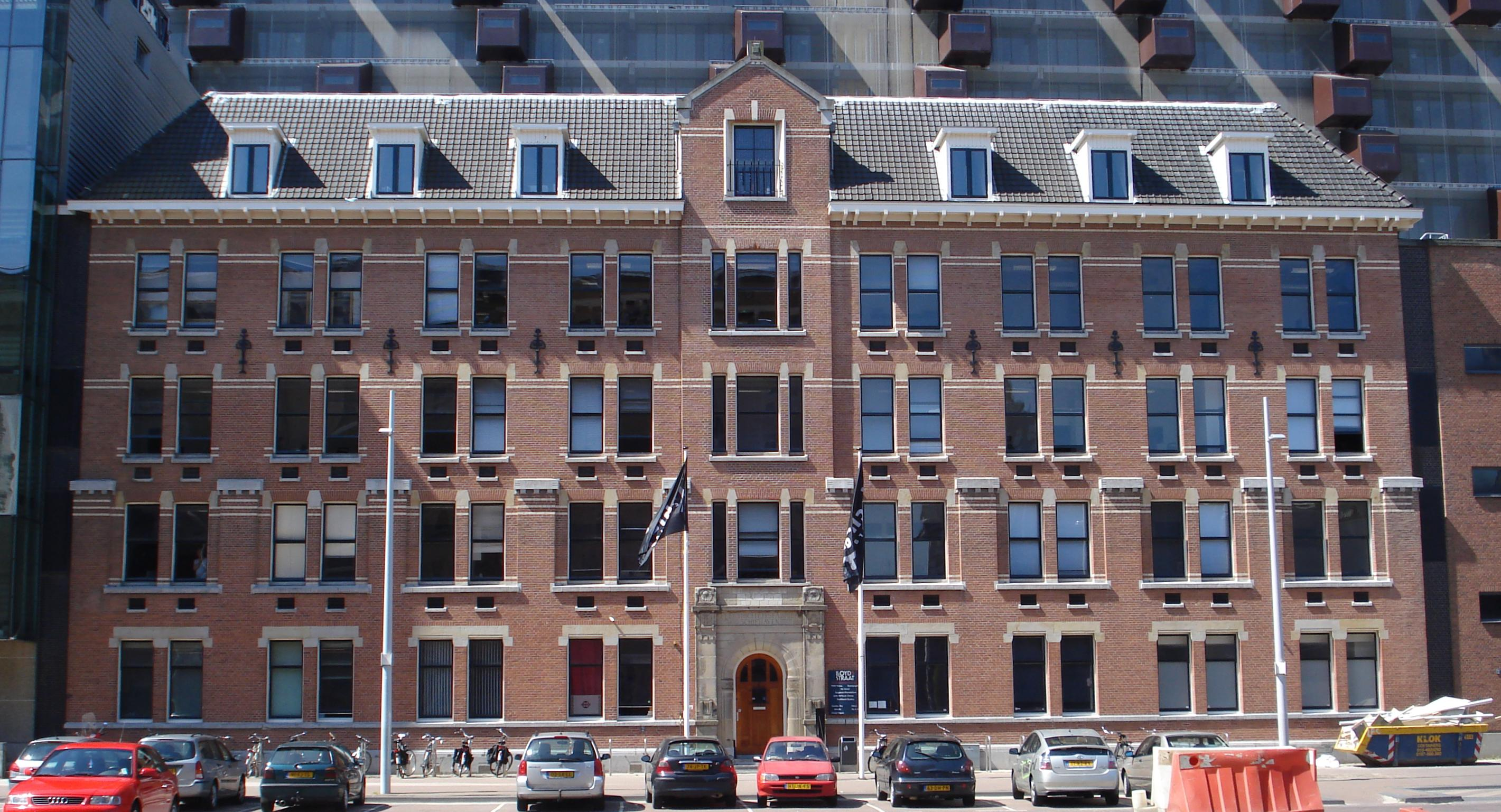
Schiecentrale

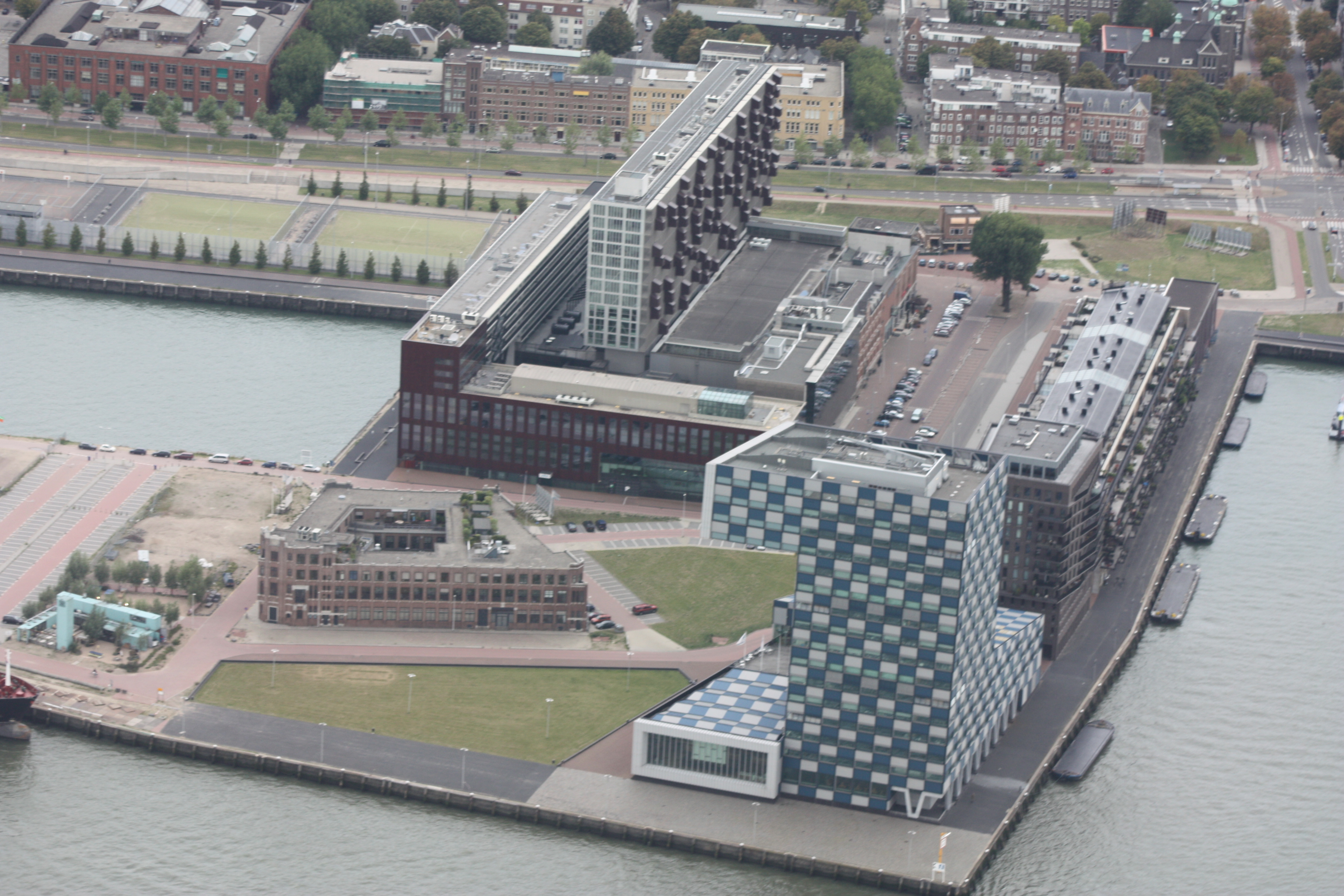
The East side of Schiecentrale 4b

The Schiecentrale is a former power plant and national monument in Rotterdam, the Netherlands. After redevelopment the building is home to film studios, offices and apartments.

The building is located in the hip quarter Lloydkwartier in Rotterdam North bank by the river Meuse. This quarter is surrounded by water and hosts high culinary spots.

== Description ==
Redevelopment of the building started in 1996 and was completed in 2008. The redeveloped building was designed by the Dutch firm Mei and constructed by the Belgian company Besix upon request of PWS.

The building is formed by two building blocks connected by a deck. There is a higher and a lower block. The higher block, which is 16 levels high, is the most impressive one. The higher block gives the essential feature to the Schiecentrale. The higher block has two long facades: one facade is parallel to the street Lloydstraat to the East and the other facade is parallel to the street Schiehavenkade to the West.

The East side of the main high block shows UFO-like protruding boxes, which are used as storage rooms. The East side is facing the skyline of Rotterdam with a view of major architectural landmarks, such as Erasmusbrug, Euromast tower, Montevideo Tower, Maastoren, World Port Center, Hotel New York, Feyenoord Stadion, Van Brienenoordbrug, amongst others.

The west side of the main high block is made of full glass windows, which can be opened if the wind force is lower than 6. The West side is facing the Port of Rotterdam with a view of Delfshaven, Delft, Schiedam, The Hague, among others.
