= Architecture Film Festival Rotterdam =

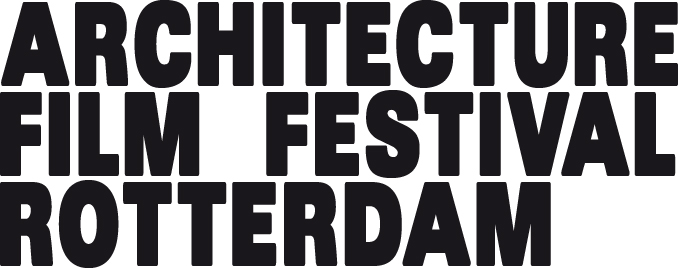
- Next edition: 9–13 October 2024
- Location: Rotterdam, Netherlands
- Language: English
- Website: http://www.affr.nl/

Architecture Film Festival Rotterdam (AFFR) is a biannual film festival screening films, shorts, animations and documentaries about architecture, urban development and city culture, for both architects and the general audience. It is the largest architectural film festival in the world. The festival takes place at different locations, with its main venue being LantarenVenster.

The first edition of the festival was held in 2000, in preparation for Rotterdam to be the European Capital of Culture.

The festival includes recently made as well as classic feature films with outstanding set design, such as The Fountainhead, Mon Oncle, Silent Running and Blade Runner, while more generally considering the way cities and other built environments are depicted in cinema.

Besides fiction films, the programme includes a large number of documentaries, about well-known architects, such as Louis Kahn or Frank Gehry, next to films documenting the design and construction process of various projects. The festival also provides a stage for experimental films that approach and use space in unconventional ways.

An important part of the programme is dedicated to films about the use of space, films that address contested spaces, the social position and responsibility of architecture and planning, and specific themes such as the influence of media on the city.

Besides films, there are usually tours, workshops, presentations, and forum discussions with architects, critics and experts from various disciplines. Special guest in 2023 was Rem Koolhaas.
