= Beyond Media =

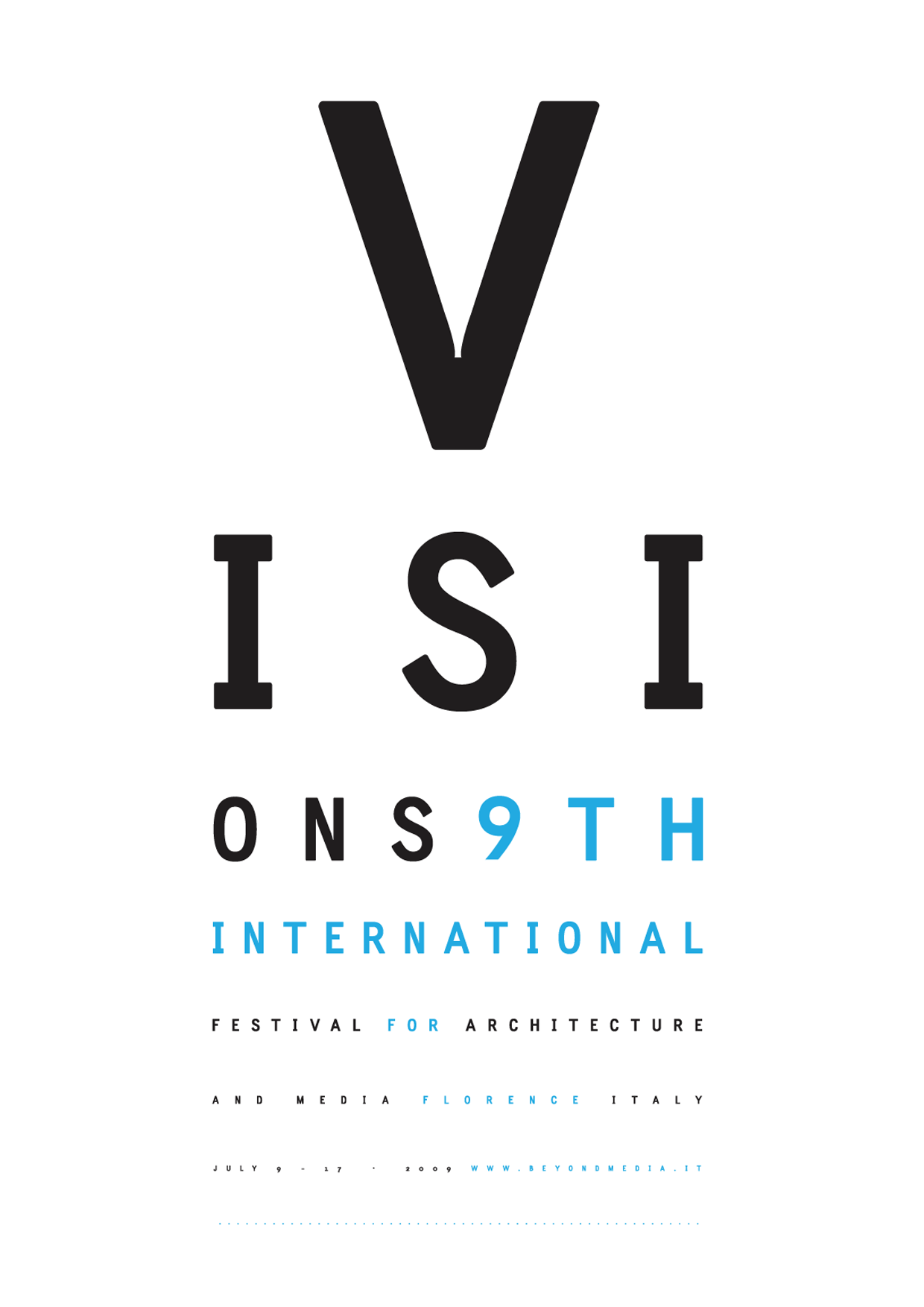
- The poster for Beyond Media 2009: Visions
- Genre: International architecture video festival
- Locations: Florence and surroundings
- Country: Italy
- Years active: 1997–2009
- Founder: Marco Brizzi
- Organiser: Image
- Website: www.beyondmedia.it

Beyond Media was an architecture film festival held in Florence from 1997 to 2009. The festival aimed at observing the use of audiovisual tools for architecture and more generally at discussing relationships between architecture and the media. Beyond Media was organized by Image, a group of architects, historians and researchers based in Florence and active in the field of communication in architecture. In the course of its nine editions, the festival became one of the main events worldwide devoted to architecture videos. The latest edition, "Beyond Media 2009: Visions", presented 80 videos selected from over 600 submissions from 35 countries.

== History ==
The festival began in the context of the deep changes occurred in the mediasphere during the 1990s. With the large diffusion of new media and computer driven design tools, videos quickly became an accessible and powerful instrument for architects. They were used by designers not only as a more lively form of representation but also as a storytelling device for projects. In other words, they made it possible for architects to express their projects in a narrative form and created a brand new and autonomous form of expression for architecture. This is the context in which Beyond Media was born and had its mission, that was to provide an account of all shifts produced by the introduction of new media in architectural design and to promote a venue for discussion about this topic. As Pedro Gadanho, today curator for Contemporary Architecture at the Museum of Modern Art in New York, wrote: “When I say that this Festival is “haunted by its very initial premises” I do not mean that showing the audiovisual media which are today quintessential to architecture representation should bear any special problem. On the contrary, it is only natural and logical that someone should be doing it. At its 9th edition, the Florence festival also has in its curriculum to be one of the firsts to do so”. Since its very first edition in 1997, the core of the event was the screening of architecture videos. Besides presenting the early videos produced by famous architects like Zaha Hadid Architects, UNStudio, MDRDV, Rem Koolhaas the festival also paid attention to emerging firms.

Beyond Media was interested in promoting the debate around the emerging phenomena occurring in the architecture world. The festival adopted an holistic approach bringing on stage experts in many disciplines such as Derrick De Kerckhove, Beatriz Colomina, Peter Wilson, Tony Fretton, John Frazer and many scholars, journalists and writers.

The festival also included a series of exhibitions. Starting from "Beyond Media 2003: Intimacy" the exhibition “Spot on schools” curated by Paola Giaconia put on display the most advanced researches produced by worldwide architecture teaching departments. Among the schools selected for the 2009 edition of the “Spot on Schools” exhibition were: Asia University, Ball State University, Clemson University, California Polytechnic State University, Southern California Institute of Technology, Rhode Island School of Design, Southern Illinois University, University of Calgary, University of Florida, University of Hong Kong, Asia University, RMIT Architecture, Universidade Tecnica de Lisboa, NABA, Politecnico di Torino. Other exhibitions were “Urban Visions” (curated by Michele Bonino) in 2009, “The Storytellers” (curated by Marco Brizzi) in 2005, “About cities” (curated by Elisa Strano) in 2003, “Architecture, media, industrial design for Prada. Prada, OMA/AMO” (curated by Clemens Weisshaar and Reed Kram) in 2002.

Beyond Media also hosted workshops and other activities aimed at promoting an experience of architecture for a non-professional or younger audience. In 2009 Beyond Media brought to Italy ¿Que es arquitectura?, a workshop created by Jorge Raedó and Eva Serrat to let the children investigate visual perception and vision.

Beyond Media was supported by many academic and public institutions. Among them: the Italian Ministry of Culture, through PARC (today PaBAAC), the Region of Tuscany, the Municipality of Florence, the University of Florence.

Starting in 2002 Beyond Media took place in two main venues in Florence, the Ospedale degli Innocenti and Stazione Leopolda.

The videos selected for the various editions of Beyond Media are part of the media archive curated by Image in Florence, Italy. The archive counts today more than 3500 architecture videos which are presented to the public during screenings hosted at museums and other cultural institutions.

Since 2015, Image has become the publisher the English-language online platform The Architecture Player. The aim of this project is to make the festival's archive progressively accessible to the public. In addition, The Architecture Player continues the curatorial work initiated by Beyond Media, selecting and presenting new videos and authors.

Gallery

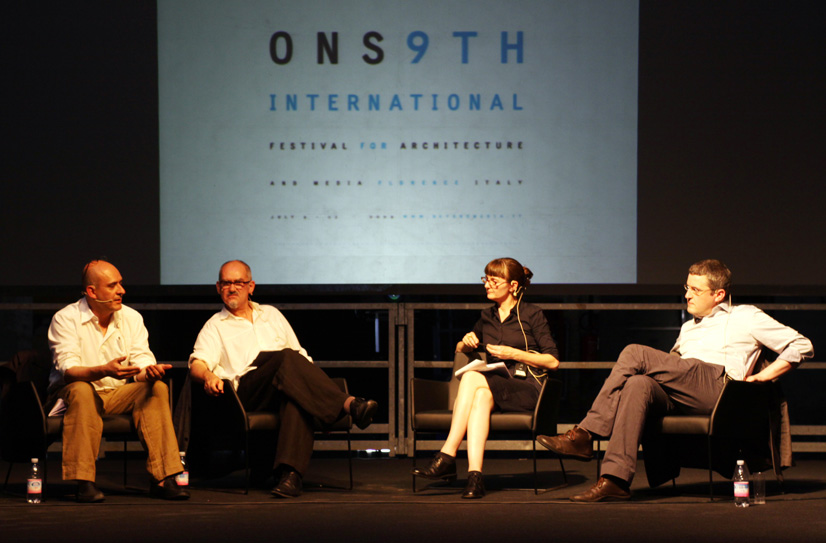
(from left to right) Francisco Sanin, Peter Wilson, Felicit Scott, Pier Vittorio Aureli. Beyond Media 2009: Visions, Florence, Stazione Leopolda.

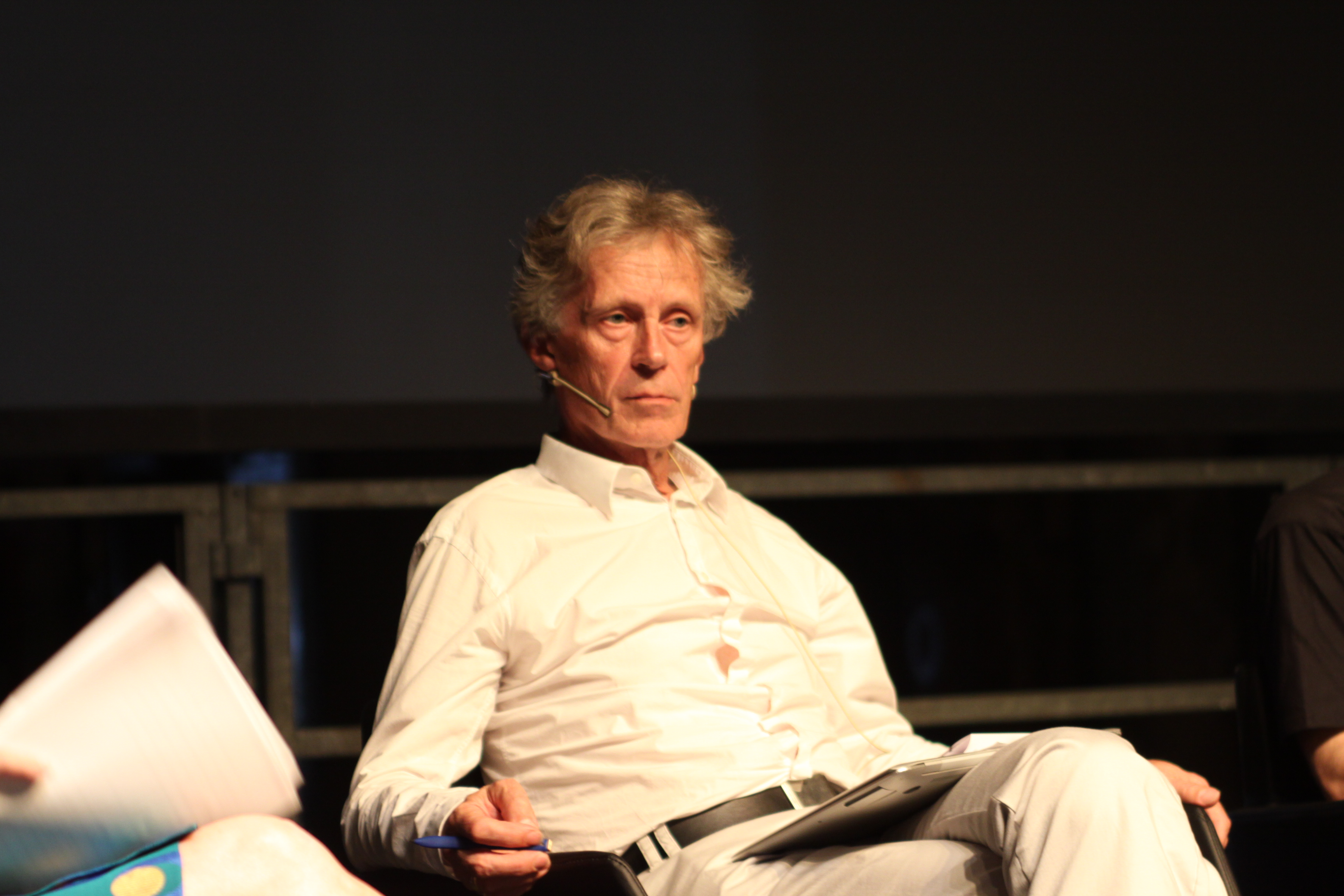
Derrick De Kerckhove. Beyond Media 2009: Visions, Florence, Stazione Leopolda.

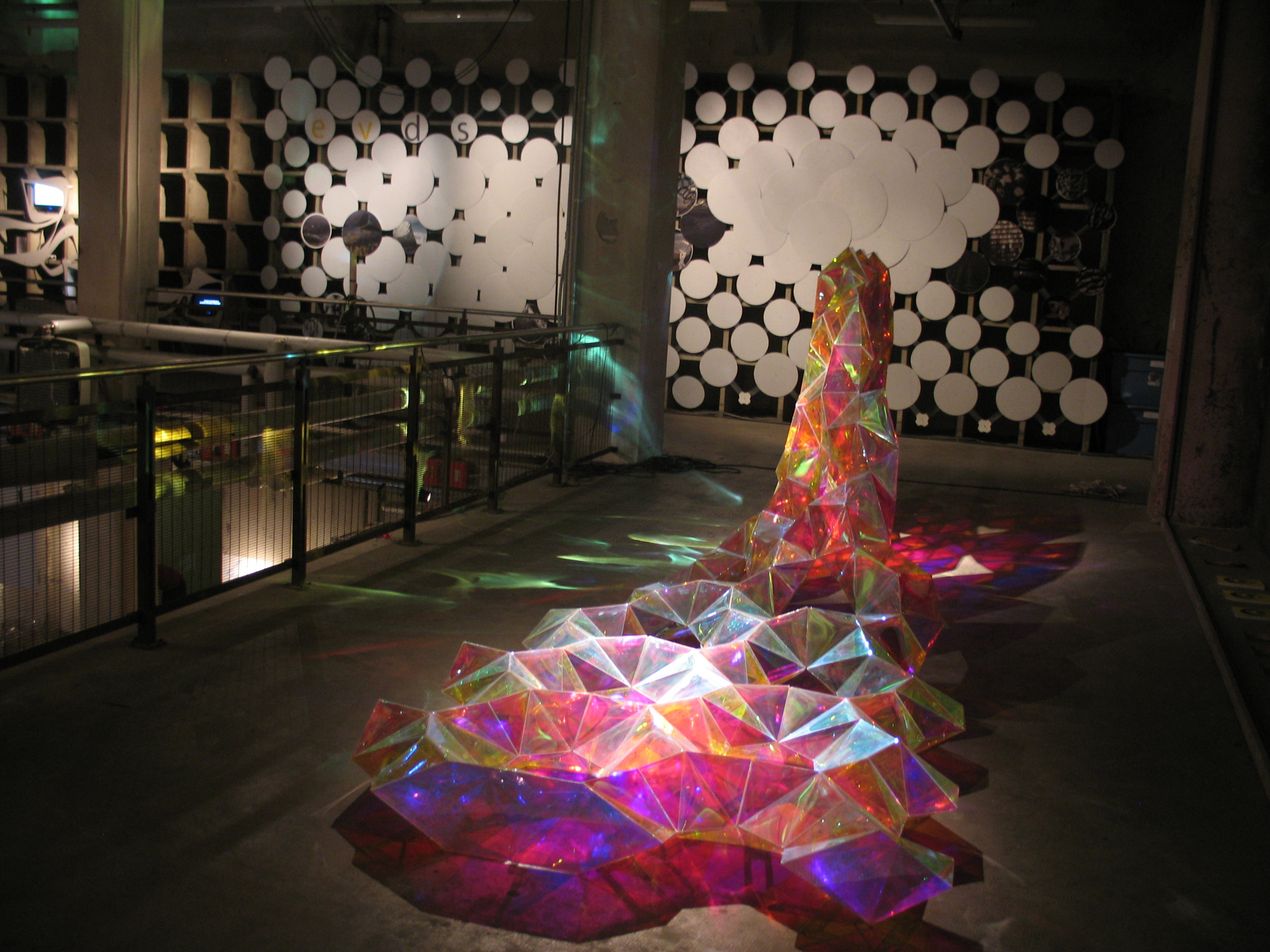
SCI-Arc installation. Spot on Schools 2009, Florence, Stazione Leopolda.

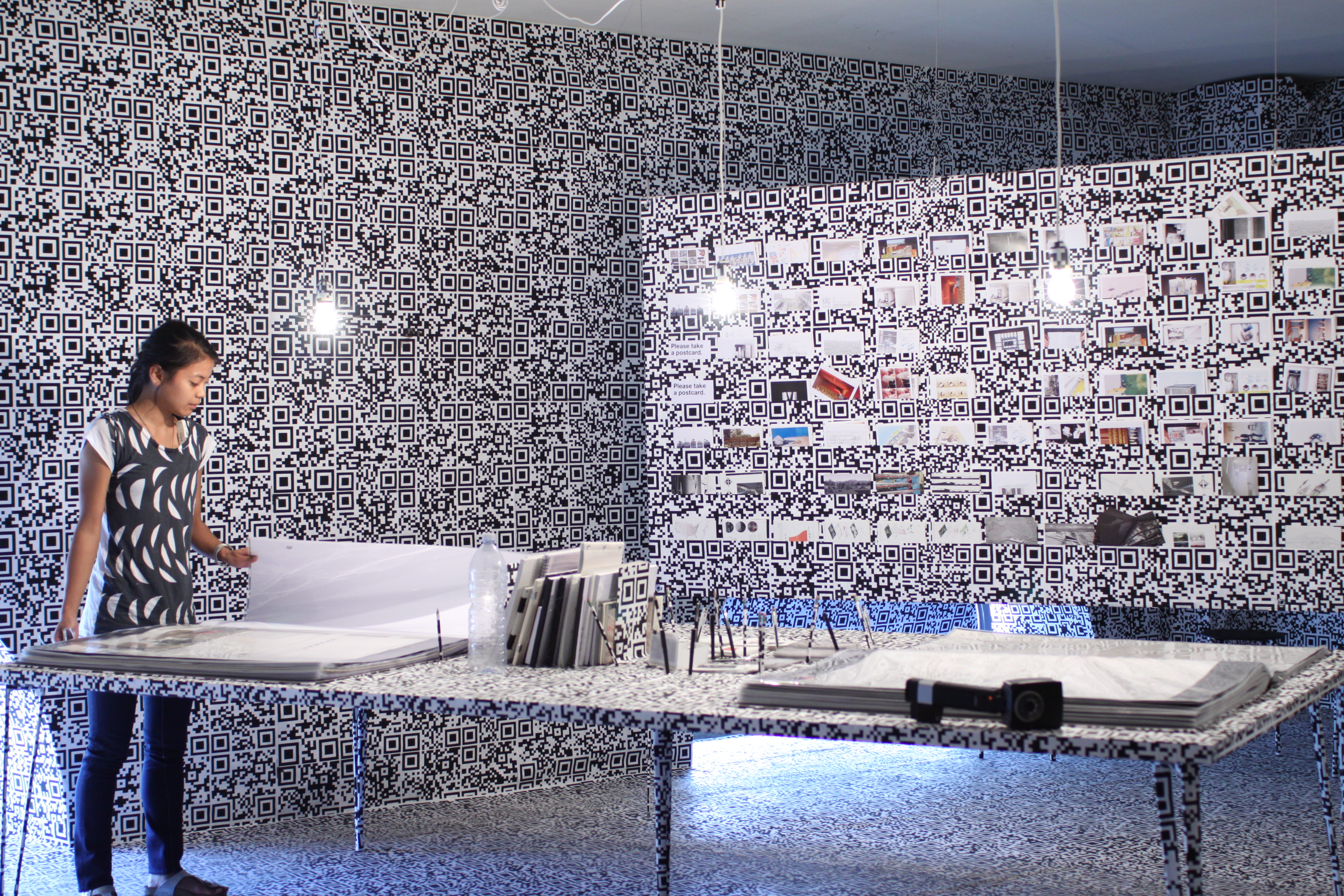
Rhode Island School of Design installation. Spot on Schools 2009, Florence, Stazione Leopolda.

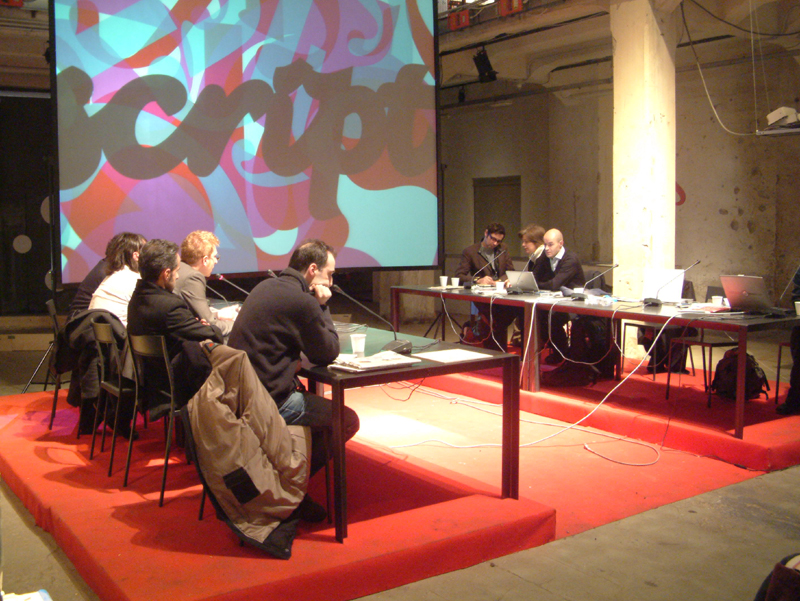
The congress. Beyond Media 2005: Script. Florence, Stazione Leopolda.

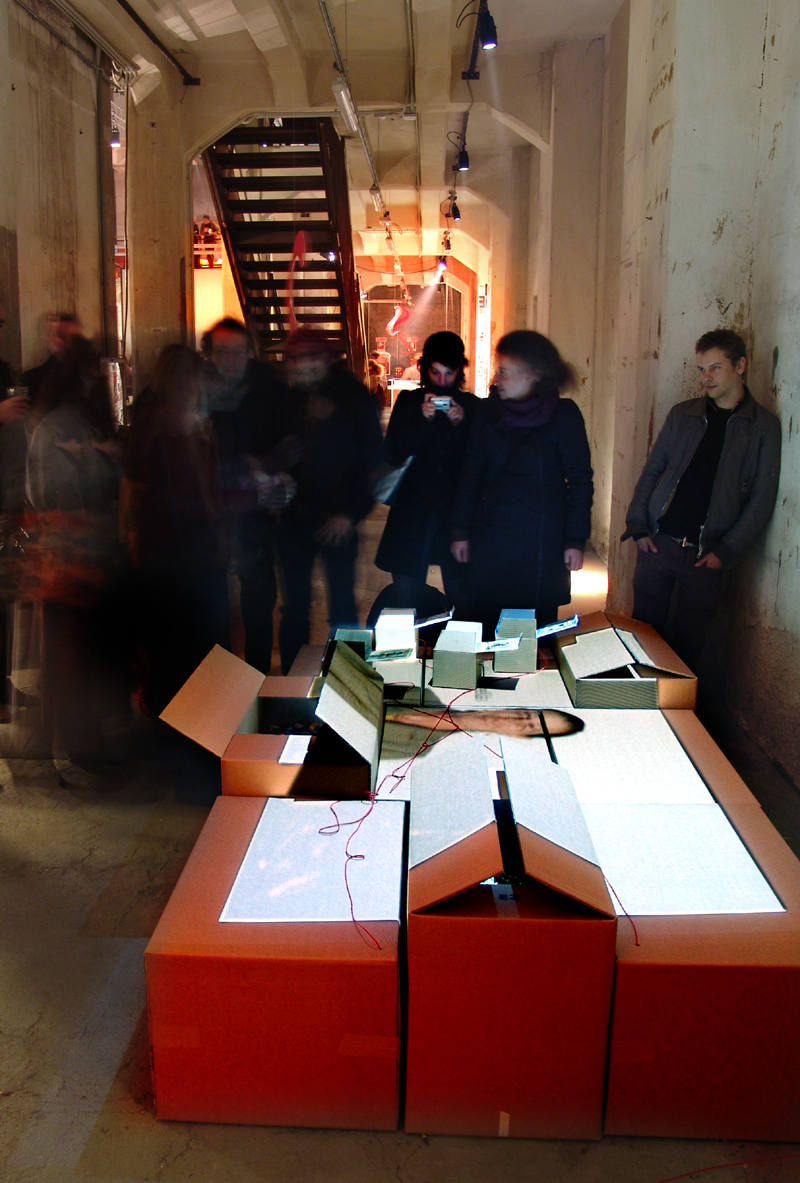
An installation at Storytellers exhibition, curated by Marco Brizzi. Beyond Media 2005: Script. Florence, Stazione Leopolda.

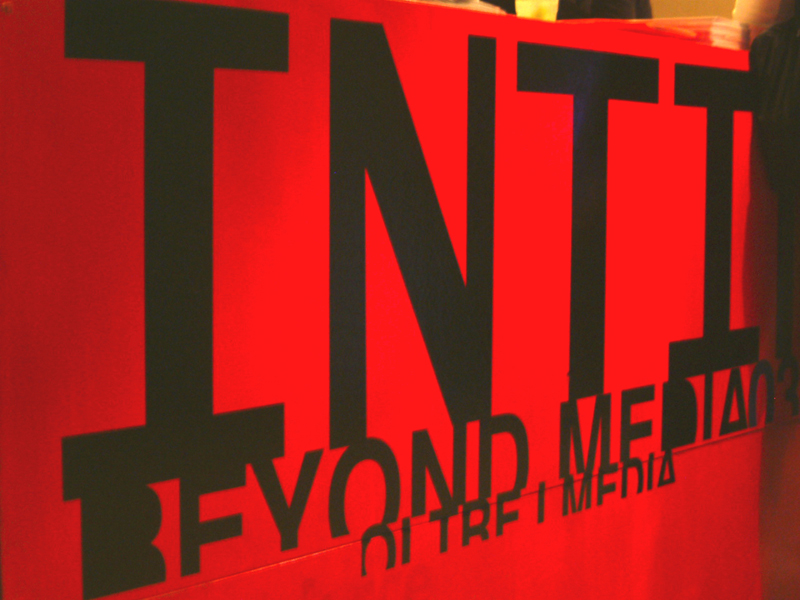
Beyond Media 2003: Intimacy. Florence, Stazione Leopolda.

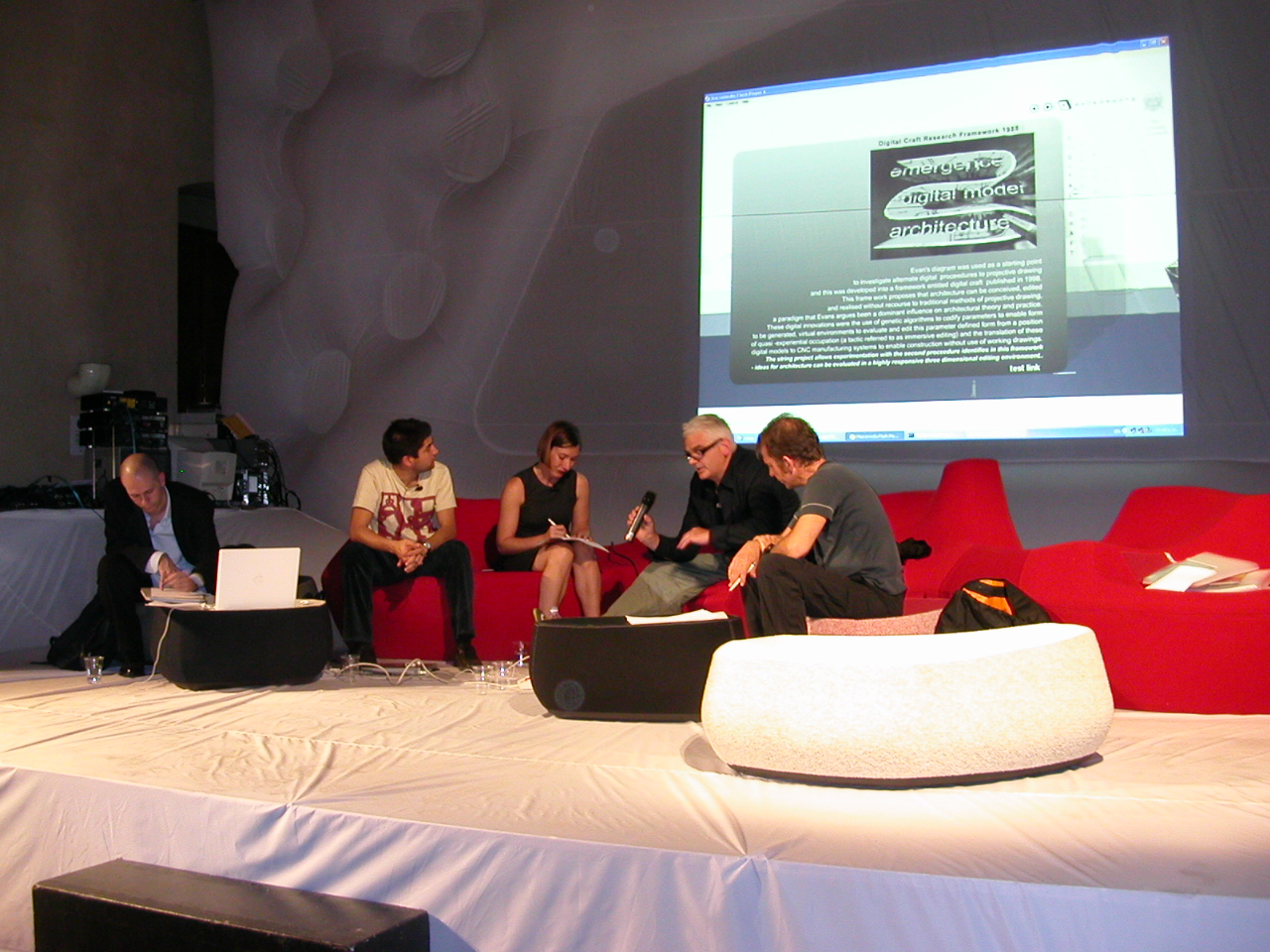
The congress. Beyond Media 2003: Intimacy. Florence, Ospedale degli Innocenti.

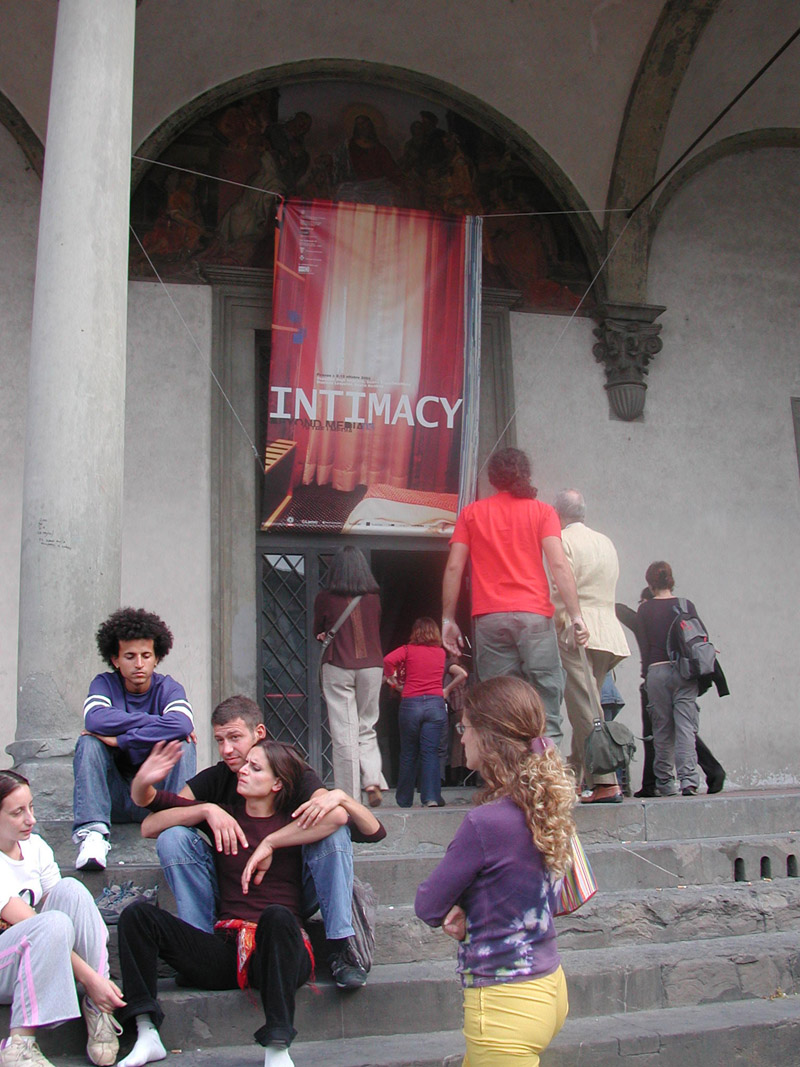
The entrance of Ospedale degli Innocenti complex. Florence, Beyond Media 2003: Script.
