= Roteb =

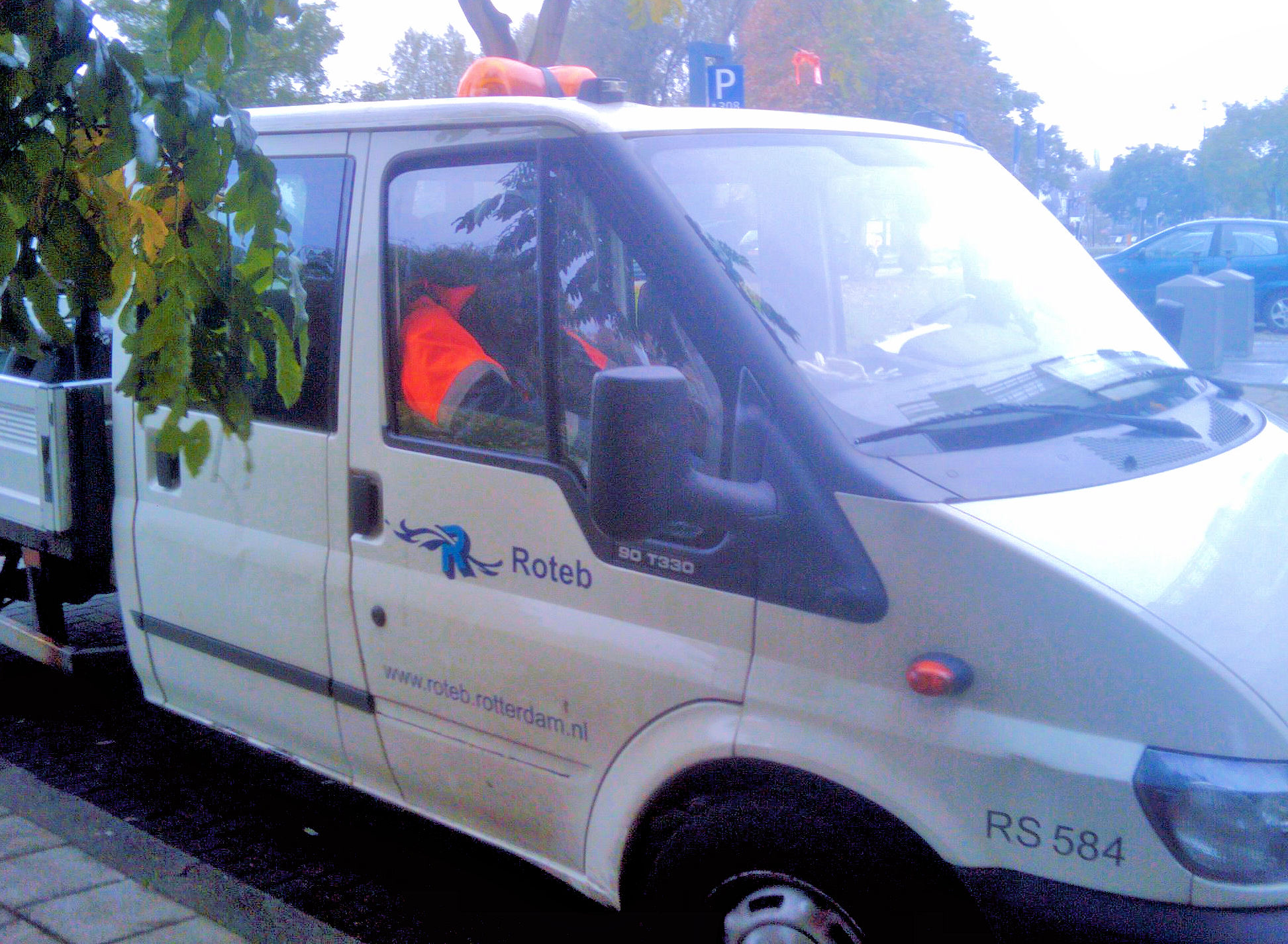
- Roteb pickup truck (2010)

Agency overview
- Formed: 1876
- Dissolved: 2019

Roteb was a city cleaning company which was in service of the City of Rotterdam and tried to make sure that the streets and squares of the city are kept tidy and they also offered waste management services. Later Roteb only leased vehicles, like city cleaning and waste management (Reiniging) this is now taken care of by the municipality as Vervoer & Materieel.

The acronym Roteb stood for Reiniging (cleaning), Ontsmetting (Desinfecting), Transport (Transport) and Brandweer (Fire Department). The Fire Department separated from ROTEB in 1972.

Roteb was founded in 1876 as the Rotterdamsche reinigingsdienst (Rotterdam cleaning service). It was dissolved in October 2019.
