= Dance Works Rotterdam/André Gingras =

Dance Works Rotterdam/André Gingras (dwrotterdam on social media) is one of the oldest dance companies in the Netherlands, founded in 1975 as Werkcentrum Dans.

== History ==
The company was founded by choreographer Käthy Gosschalk as Werkcentrum Dans. At that time, the company was mainly a centre for dance education and workshops. In 1988 Gosschalk changed the name to De Rotterdamse Dansgroep (The Rotterdam Dance Company). Gosschalk directed the company for almost 25 years, working with several acclaimed Dutch and international dancers and choreographers.

Ton Simons was appointed artistic director in 1999. Under his leadership, the organization adopted a more international image, becoming Dance Works Rotterdam in 2001. Simons' work was characterized by pure dance language. Since this time, the company toured abroad in the Czech Republic, Switzerland, Cyprus, France, Romania, Russia and Indonesia.

Beginning in March 2010, Dance Works Rotterdam entered a new artistic phase with the appointment of André Gingras as artistic director. Under the artistic leadership of Gingras, Dance Works Rotterdam/André Gingras put contemporary dance in a social context, using energetic, raw dance to explore moral dilemmas, and emphasising collaboration and dialogue with other organisations and artists beyond the boundaries of contemporary dance.

The company has played an important part in the development of dance as a valuable component of contemporary culture. Many renowned Dutch dance artists started their career with the company, including Anouk van Dijk, Hans Tuerlings and Ed Wubbe. Throughout its rich history, the company has danced works by major international choreographers such as Merce Cunningham, Jacopo Godani, Bill T. Jones, Amanda Miller and Stephen Petronio. The latest coproduction (LIBIDO) which exemplifies the new artistic direction of the company, is with Canadian choreographer Dave St. Pierre. In this new phase, Dance Works Rotterdam/André Gingras remains at the forefront of choreographic developments through Gingras' repertory and dynamic new collaborations with internationally renowned artists.

== Repertoire ==
Works by or under the artistic direction of André Gingras:

- The Sweet Art of Bruising (2011)
- Obscenitas (2011) (video installation)
- Anatomica#1 (2011)
- LIBIDO (2010) - co production with Dave St-Pierre
- IDORU (2009)
- Les Commerçants (2009) (video installation)
- The Autopsy Project (2007)
- trans.form (2006)
- Hypertopia (2006)
- The Lindenmeyer System (2004)
- zeropoint (2004)
- The Sweet Flesh Room (2002)
- CYP17 (2000)
