= Maastoren =

Second tallest building in the Netherlands

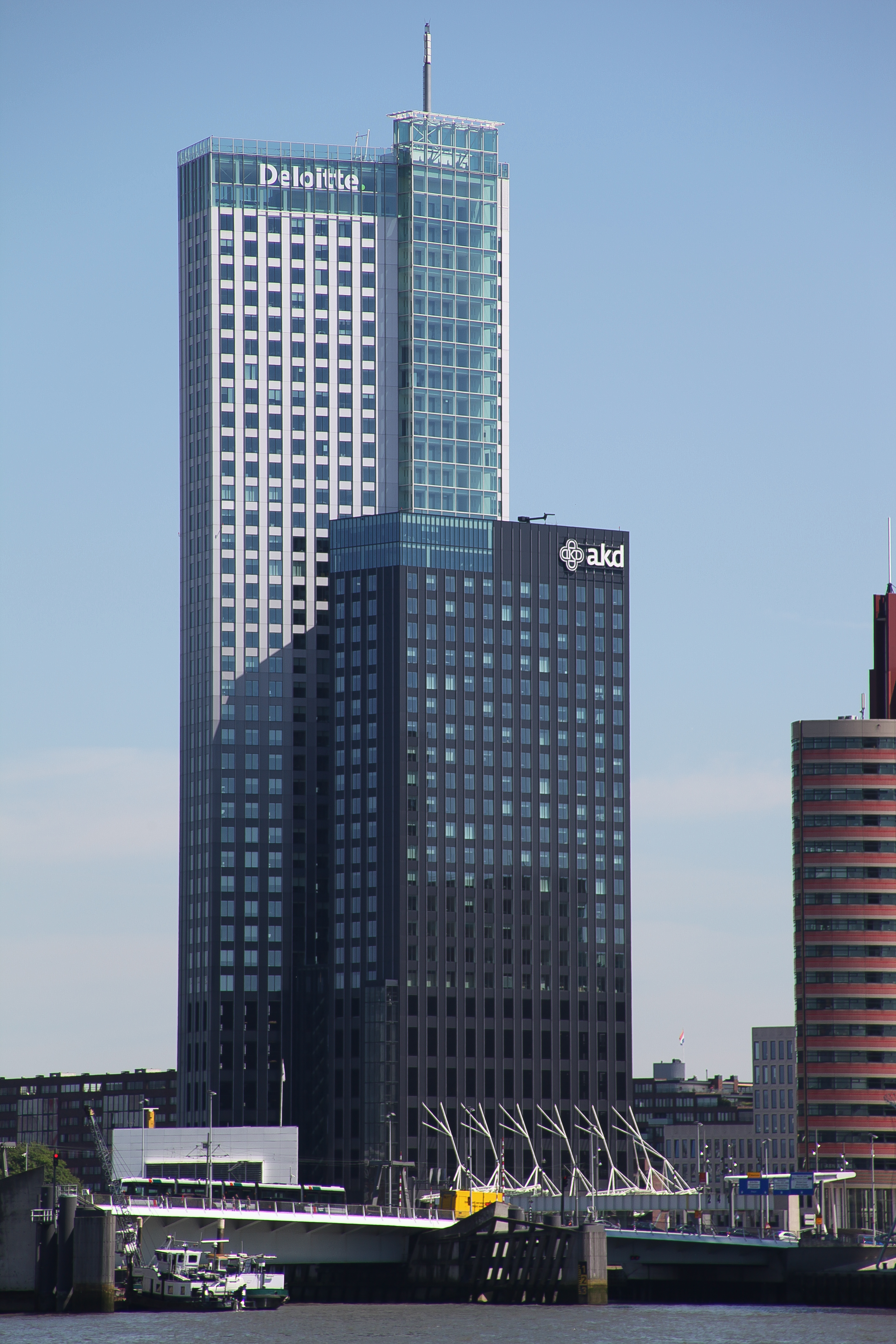
- The Maastoren in July 2012

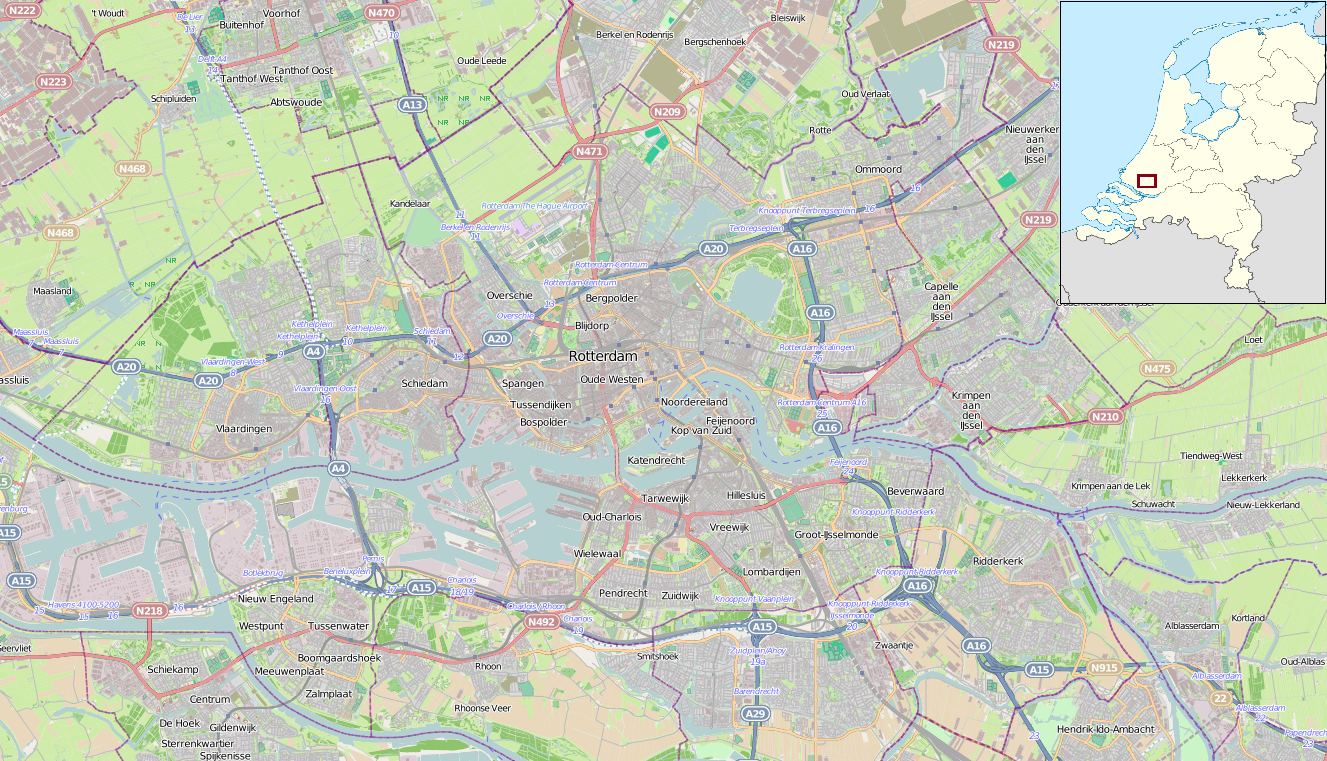
- Location within Rotterdam

General information
- Status: In use
- Type: Offices
- Location: Rotterdam, Netherlands
- Coordinates: 51°54′31″N 4°29′36″E
- Groundbreaking: 25 April 2007
- Construction started: October 2006
- Topped-out: 27 May 2009
- Opened: 28 May 2010
- Cost: €67 million
- Owner: OVG (2006-2009); SEB Asset Management (2009-2014); NorthStar (2014-2018); Joint Venture with FOM Real Estate, Asia Pacific Real Estate and Coquine SA. (2018 - Present)

Height
- Height: 164.75 m (541 ft) (architectural); 177.7 m (583 ft) (tip)

Technical details
- Floor count: 44 (two underground floors excluded)
- Floor area: 69,000 m^{2} (742,710 sq ft)

Design and construction
- Architecture firm: Dam & Partners Architecten; Odile Decq Benoit Cornette; OTH (interior)
- Developer: OVG
- Main contractor: Besix

The Maastoren (Dutch for Meuse Tower) is with its height of 165 metres (541 feet) the second tallest building in the Netherlands. The office building is situated on the bank of the Nieuwe Maas, after which the building is named, in the neighborhood Kop van Zuid in the South Holland city of Rotterdam. The Maastoren was built between 2006 and 2009, and had OVG as its developer. The Maastoren has a total of 44 above ground floors and two underground floors.

The Maastoren serves as the headquarters of the Dutch branch of Deloitte, and is used by the company AKD. In 2019, the State of the Netherlands leased an area of 7,000 m^{2} (75,347 sq ft). Around 1,600 employees of both companies work in the office building. The Maastoren has a total floor area of 69,000 m^{2} (742,710 sq ft), of which around 36,500 m^{2} (392,883 sq ft) is rentable office space. Also, the Maastoren features a parking garage with ten floors, which is operated by APCOA.

== History ==
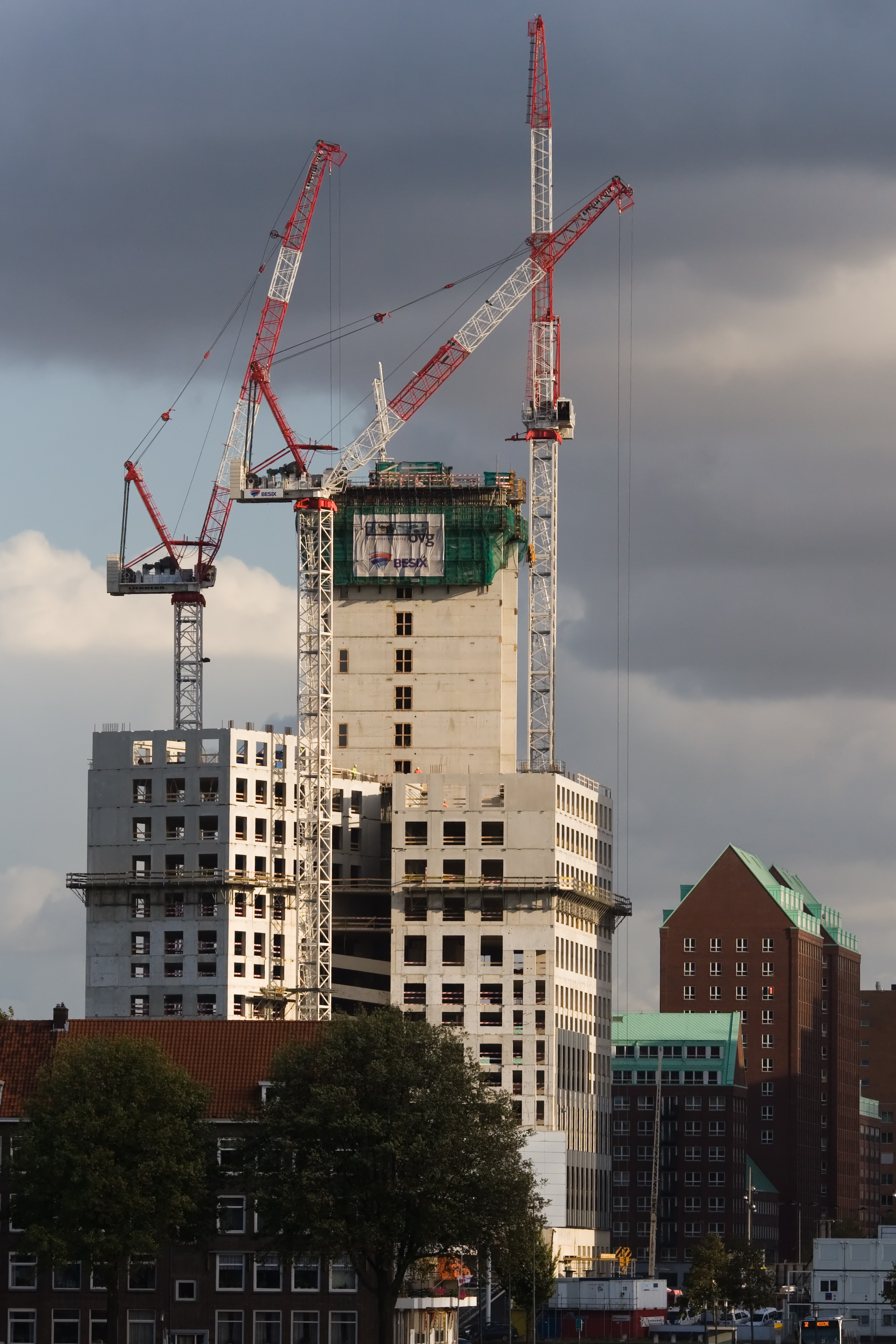
The Maastoren under construction in October 2008

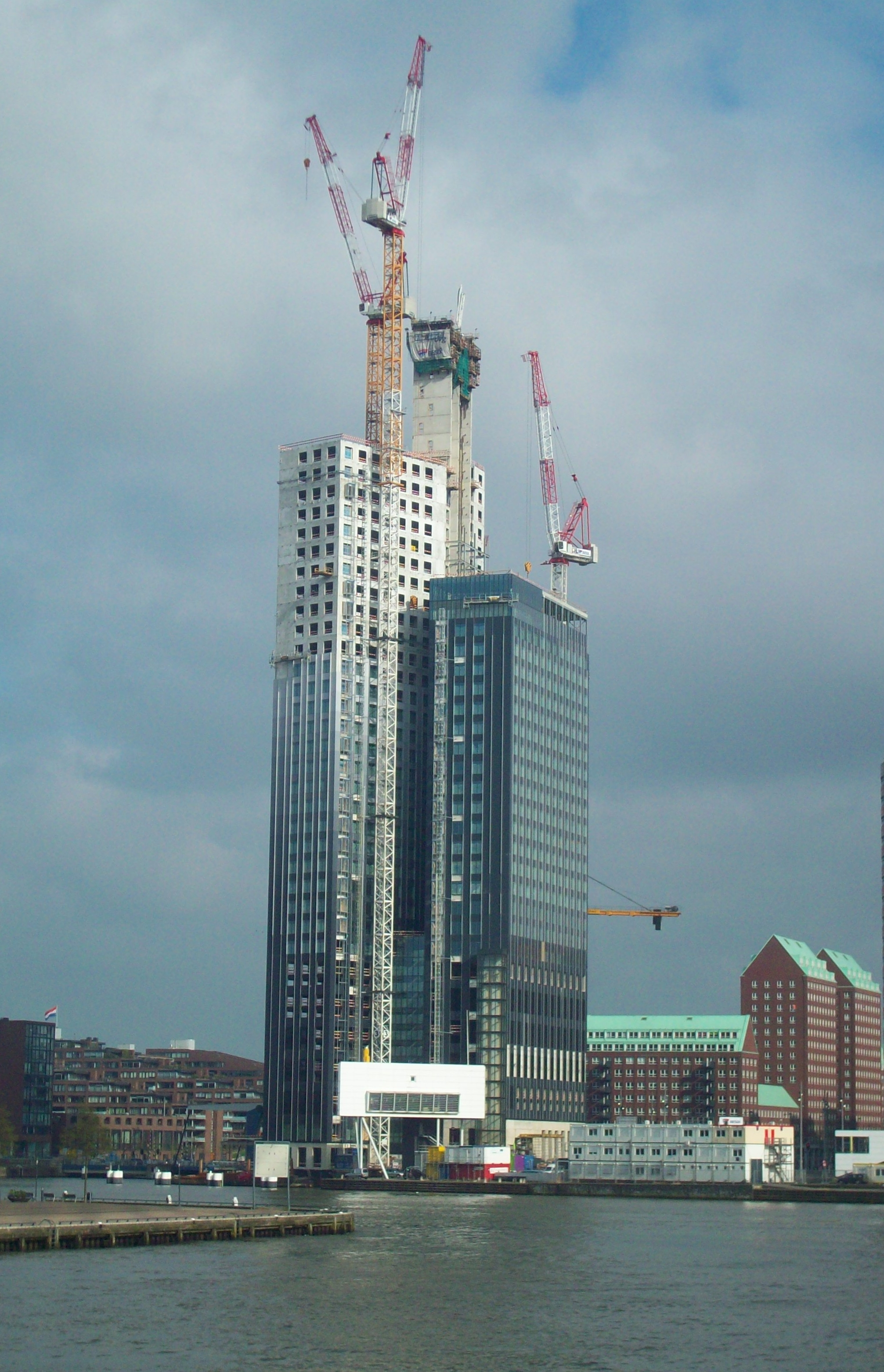
The Maastoren under construction in April 2009

=== Prior to the construction ===
When the Dutch branch of Deloitte wanted a new headquarters, it chose the current location of the Maastoren. Later, AKD stepped into the project as well. Both companies chose OVG as the developer of the new office building. Dam & Partners Architecten designed the Maastoren with Odile Decq Benoit Cornette. Also, engineering firm Zonneveld and the company Techniplan Adviseurs were involved in the developing process. Besix was the main contractor, and received €67 million for building the Maastoren.

The municipality of Rotterdam agreed with the construction of the Maastoren, but in April 2006 the council called for a debate on the subject. At the end of May, alderman Hamit Karakus said to the council that the Maastoren would be built and that the municipality would listen to the objections. The council agreed with the construction in the following month. As a reaction, Vereniging Woon- en Leefklimaat Kop van Zuid/ Noordereiland (Dutch for Association Living Environment Kop van Zuid/Noordereiland) filed a lawsuit against the municipality of Rotterdam. The association aimed at preventing the Maastoren from being constructed, and was previously known as Comité Maastoren Nee! (Dutch for Committee Maastoren No!). 200 objections against a license had been filed, mostly because of the height of the Maastoren and the above ground parking garage. Some nearby residents also argued the office building would cause environmental and traffic problems, and complained about the lack of public eating facilities in the building.

=== Construction ===
The process of making the site ready for construction started at the end of July 2006, but the preparations were shut down two weeks later on 3 September. On 21 September, the preparations were continued. The digging of the foundation started the following month. Part of the construction site was kept dry using sheet piles, because that part was situated in the river. In November 2006, all the remaining objections against the Maastoren were rejected by the general committee on objections of Rotterdam. The lawsuit against the construction, however, was still ongoing. On 25 April 2007, the groundbreaking took place. Ivo Opstelten, who was mayor of Rotterdam at that time, hammered the first pile into the ground. Back then, the opening of the Maastoren was planned in 2009. Meanwhile, the judge had given the verdict in the lawsuit of the association against Rotterdam, that was filed to stop the construction. The judge said the license was justified, and thus the municipality had won the lawsuit.

On 27 May 2009, the Maastoren was topped out. At that time, all floors up to the twentieth floor were completely finished. To celebrate this occasion, alderman Hamit Karakus and CEO of OVG Coen van Oostram abseiled down the building to the 31st floor two days later. The construction was completed in November 2009. The developer, OVG, sold the Maastoren to the German company SEB Asset Management for €159.5 million the same year.

=== Opening and sale ===
The Maastoren was put into use on 15 March 2010, and was officially opened two months later on 28 May. OVG, the developer, received a plaque from the Council on Tall Buildings and Urban Habitat. The plaque states the Maastoren has a height of 164.75 metres (541 feet), and is the tallest building in the Netherlands. The plaque is displayed in the lobby of the Maastoren since the opening. During the opening, Ahmed Aboutaleb, the mayor of Rotterdam, received a copy of the book Maastoren about the building, which was published by the Rotterdam Skyscraper Foundation.

In December 2014, the American real estate company NorthStar bought a portfolio, that consisted of eleven office buildings including the Maastoren, from SEB Asset Management. NorthStar paid €1.1 billion for the entire portfolio.

In 2018, the Maastoren was acquired by an investment consortium led by FOM Real Estate from Heidelberg, Germany.

== Architecture ==
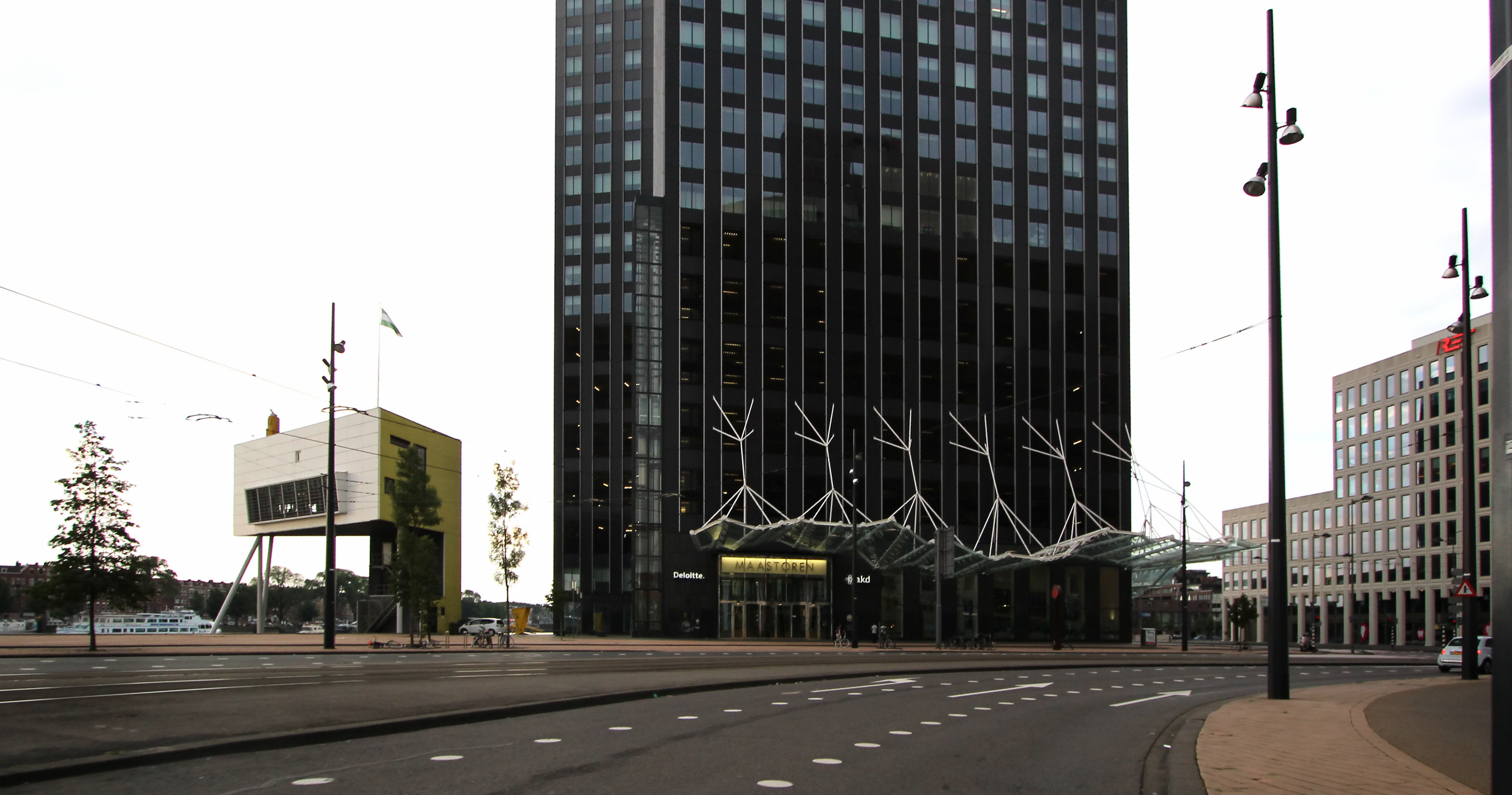
The main entrance in June 2014

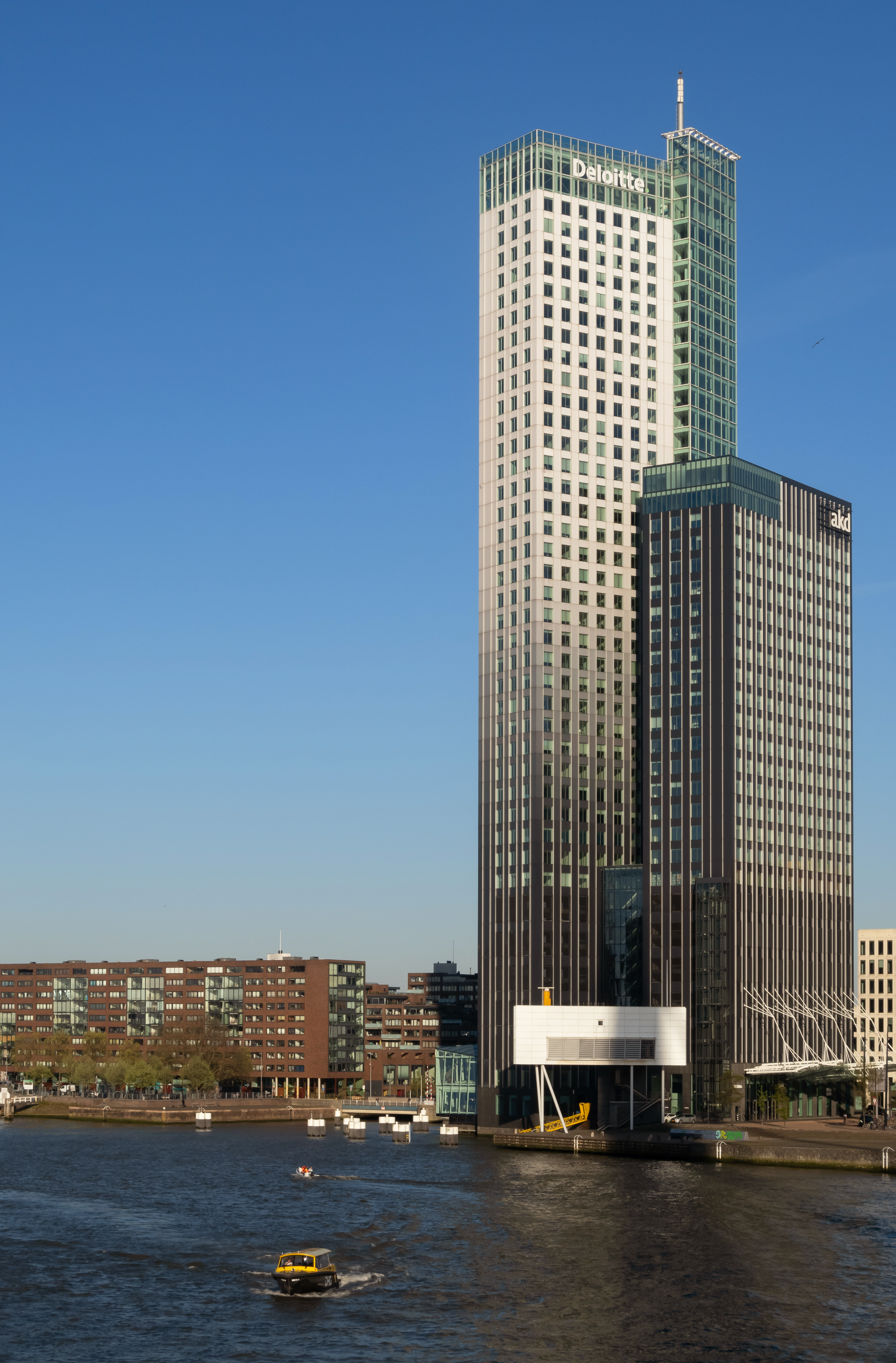
Maastoren in 2022

The Maastoren is designed by Dam & Partners Architecten. Also, the architecture firm Odile Decq Benoit Cornette was involved in the designing progress, and architecture firm OTH designed the interior of the office building. The skyscraper consists of two main elements: one has a height of 165 metres (541 feet) and one is slightly turned compared to the first one and is around 105 metres (344 feet) tall. Also, the Maastoren has a glass extension. The strength of the building is provided by a core with two inner walls, by other inner walls perpendicular to the core, and by the exterior that consists of prefab elements. These parts are made out of concrete. The core is occupied by the restrooms and some of the elevators among other things. The area of the core varies depending on the height and its dimensions on average are 13 metres (43 feet) by 10 metres (33 feet). The core was constructed using a climbing formwork.

The base of the Maastoren is situated on a layer of sand, that is situated on layers of clay. Two sides of the base of the building are located in the Nieuwe Maas. The foundation consists of almost 500 piles, on which an almost 2 metres (7 feet) thick foundation plate rests. The underground parking garage starts on top of that foundation plate.

The exterior of the Maastoren is wrapped in panels, that give the building its colors. The windows are located in between those panels. The color of the Maastoren changes gradually as the building rises: the building is colored dark grey at the bottom and silver white at the top. To create these color changes, the panels at the bottom are made of dimension stones and the panels higher in the building are made of 22 shades of aluminium. The aluminium panels cover slightly more than the upper half of the Maastoren, and they become lighter as the building rises. The different colors of the facade were chosen to make the building resemble the horizon. The dark grey dimension stones at the bottom are meant to resemble the basalt wharf. However, the facade near the elevators is in contrary to the rest of the facade entirely made out of glass. The parking garage has grids instead of windows, to reduce nuisance caused by the wind.

The Maastoren is equipped with jetties to prevent collisions with large ships. Also, the building has a dock for water taxis. The interior of the Maastoren is exclusively heated and cooled by the water of the Nieuwe Maas. Water is being brought to storage tanks with diameters of 70 metres (230 feet) by heat exchangers. The heat and cold is being stored using seasonal thermal energy storage. There's one storage tank available for the heat, that is filled during summer, and one for the cold, that is filled during winter. The Maastoren is therefore not connected to district heating. The water from the river is used to supply the fire sprinkler system as well.

=== Interior ===
The Maastoren has a parking garage with ten floors, of which two are located underground. Situated above the underground parking garage, the ground floor houses the main entrance, above which a glass canopy is located to decrease the effect of the wind. Also, the ground floor includes a reception, waiting space, meeting space, space for informal meetings, and a bar that bears the name Grand Café. The second floor houses conference rooms and a cafetaria. The parking garage continues on the third floor, and goes on to the 11th floor. This part of the parking garage can be accessed by a ramp, that goes through the lobby. The Maastoren has 634 parking spaces in total. 446 of them are part of a public parking garage, that is operated by Q-Park. Most of the parking garage is above ground because of the small size of the lot and because of the high costs of a deep underground parking garage. There's a gym on the twelfth floor, just above the parking garage.

The office floors of Deloitte and AKD start above the parking garage, and continue to the top of the Maastoren. The top floor is occupied by a conference room with glass walls. These glass walls extend beyond the roof to create the illusion that the Maastoren fades into the air. The building has twelve elevators (including service elevators), of which two glass elevators are situated on the exterior to reach the above ground parking garage. The three fastest elevators, that serve the top floors, can reach a maximum speed of around 22 km/h (14 mph).

=== Height ===
The architectural height of the Maastoren is 164.75 metres (541 feet), but there's a mast above that height that isn't included in the architectural height. The total height with the mast included is 177.7 metres (583 feet). The highest occupied floor is located twenty metres under the top at 154.1 metres (506 feet) above the ground.

== Maastoren Challenge ==
The Maastoren Challenge is a sporting event inside the Maastoren, that has been held in 2013 and in 2015, to raise money for charity. The competitors start at the bottom of the office building, and have to reach the top of the Maastoren by using the stairs only. The 2013 edition was held on 23 November and the 2015 edition on 18 April. During the second edition the 335 participants raised €21,635. That money was donated to the foundation Make-A-Wish Nederland.

== Awards ==
The Maastoren has received two awards: De Vernufteling, a yearly engineering award, in 2007 and the FGH Vastgoedprijs, a biennial award, in 2010. De Vernufteling was awarded to Techniplan Adviseurs because of the heating and cooling system of the building, that uses seasonal thermal energy storage. The FGH Vastgoedprijs was awarded to the developer OVG by Aleid Wolfsen, back then mayor of Utrecht, on 8 November 2010. The award comprised a bronze statuette and a plaque. The judge said the Maastoren was a real eye-catcher and a monumental building. Furthermore, the judge called the building way ahead of its time.

Records
Preceded by Montevideo	tallest building in the Netherlands; 164.75 metres (540.5 ft); 2009–2021	Succeeded by De Zalmhaven
