= Rotterdam =

City in South Holland, Netherlands

- City and municipality
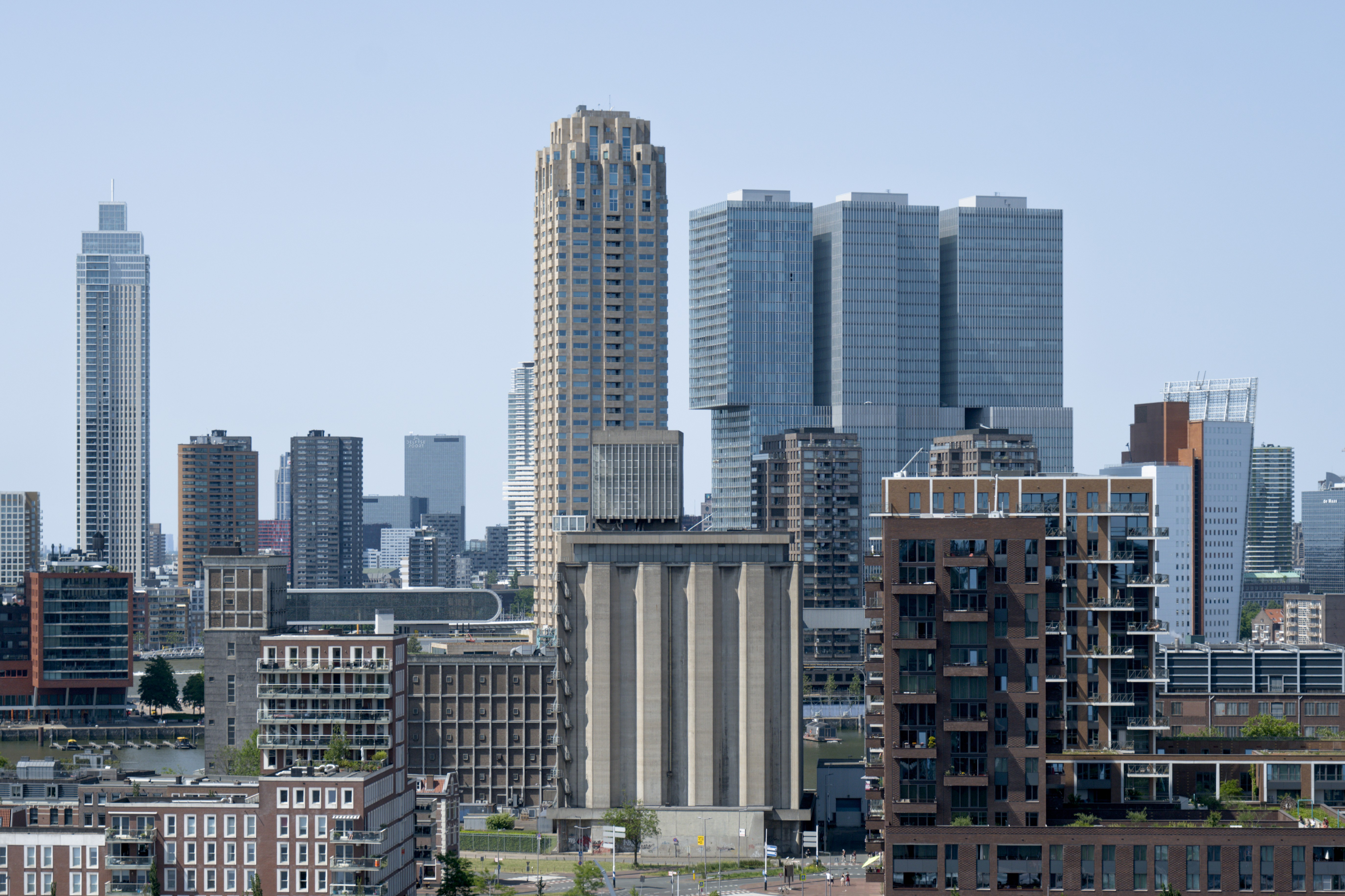
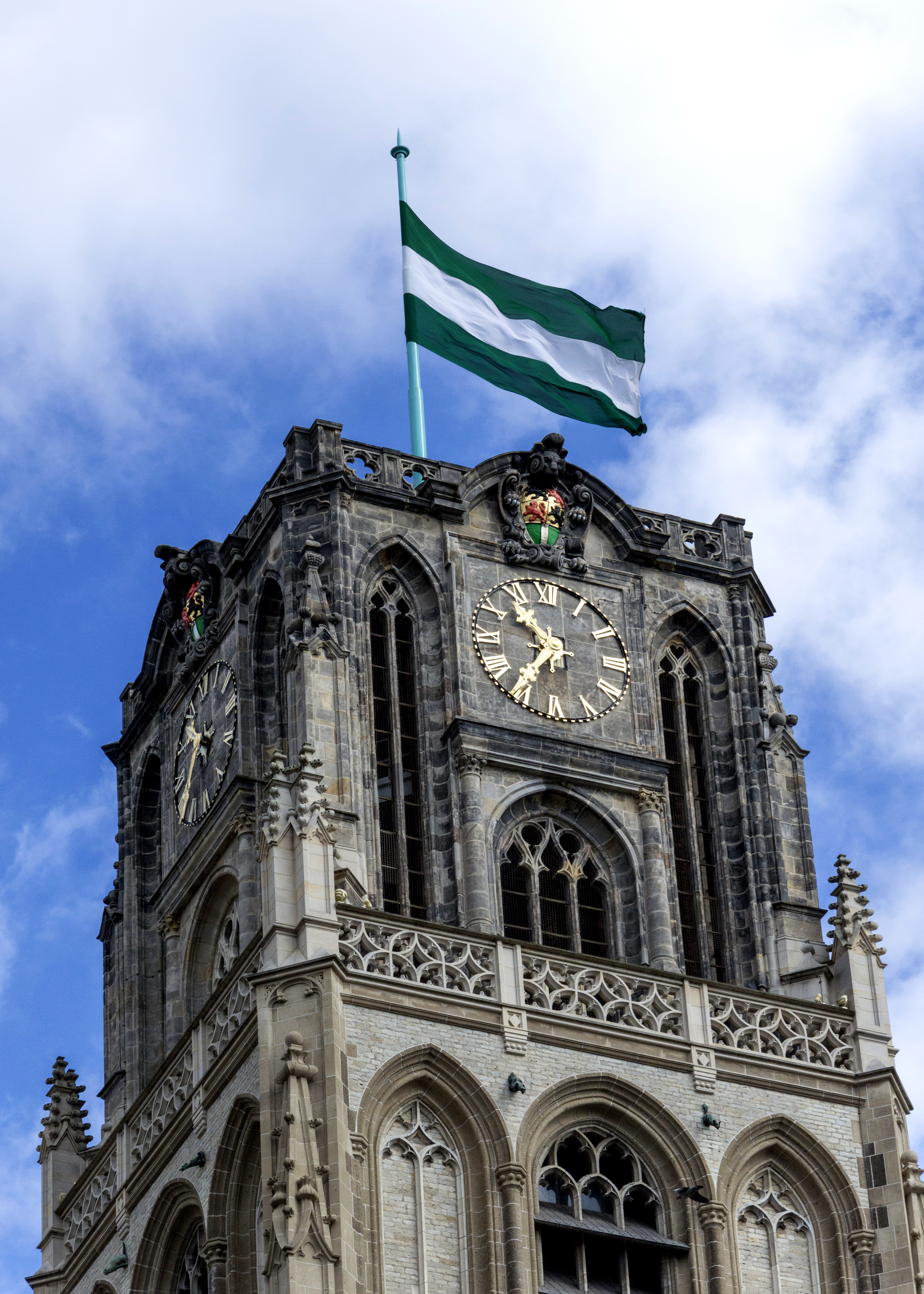
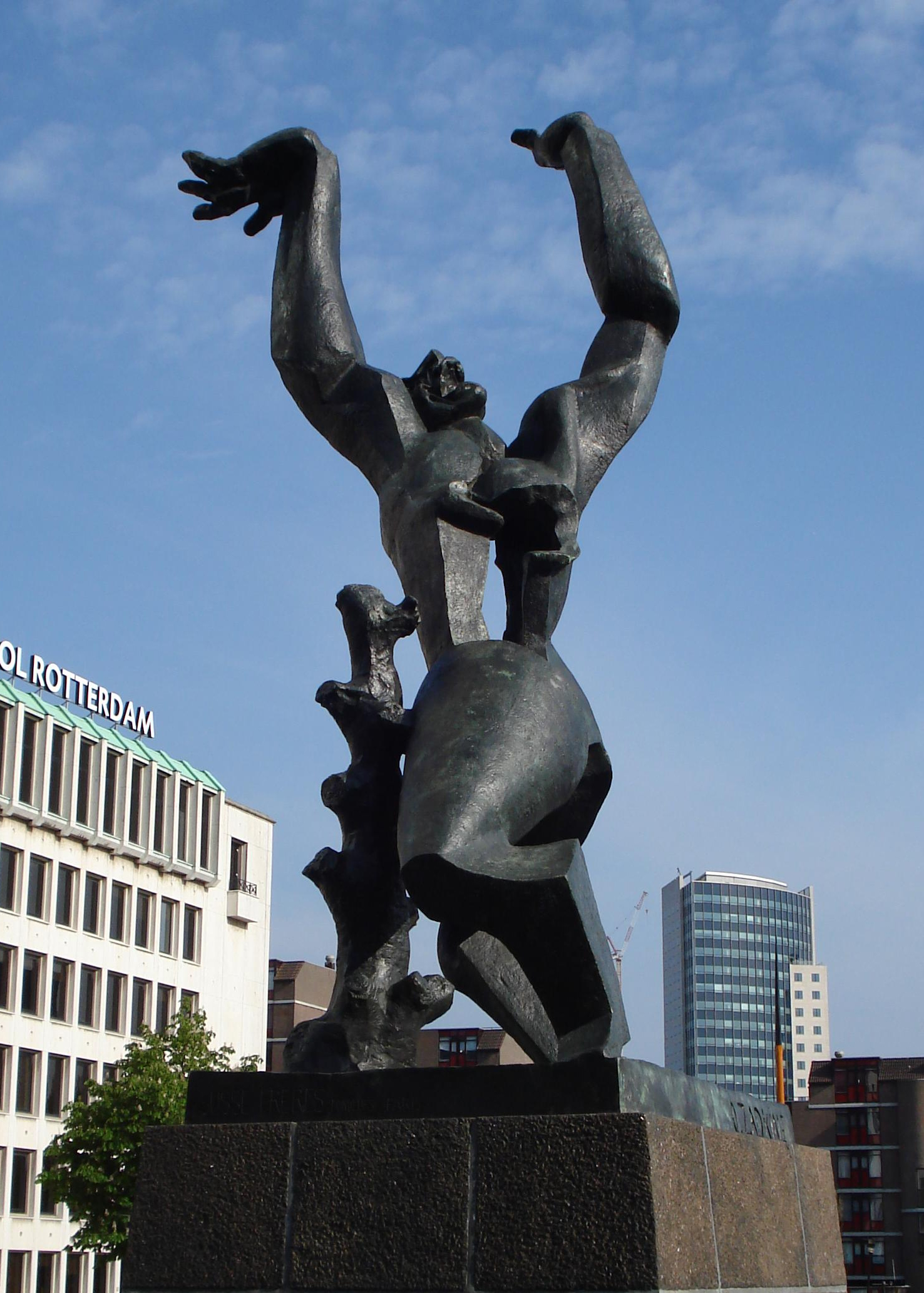
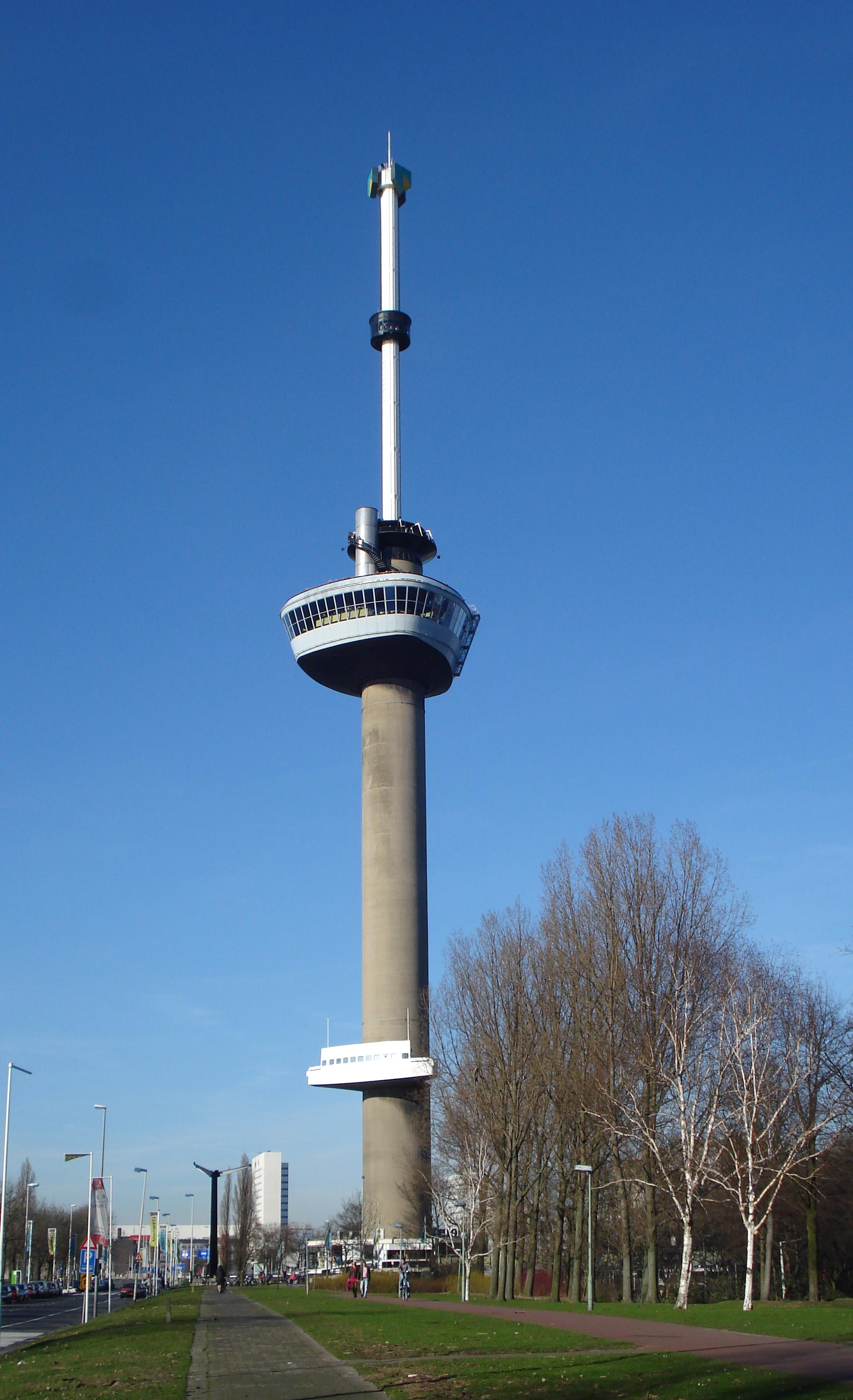
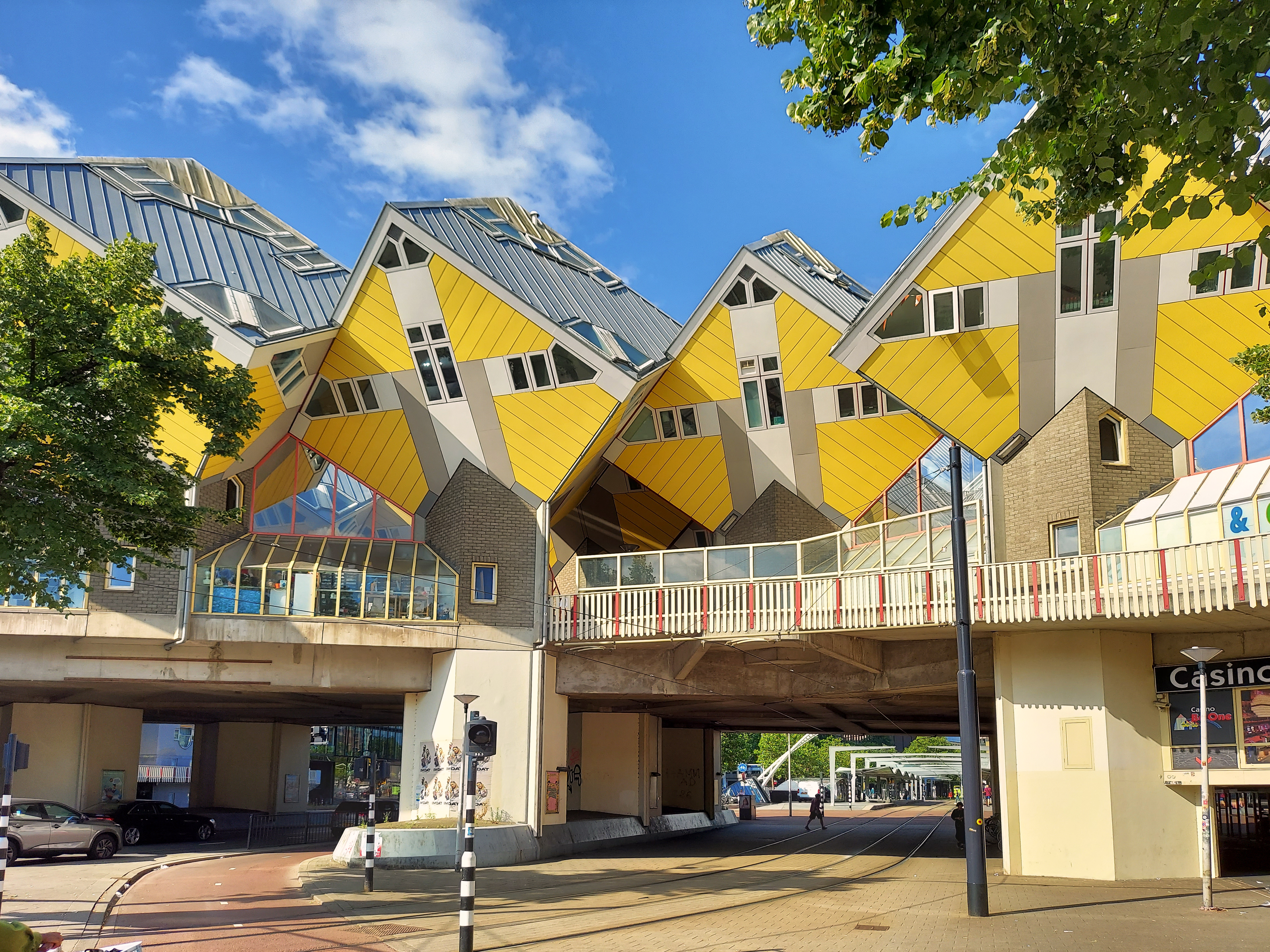
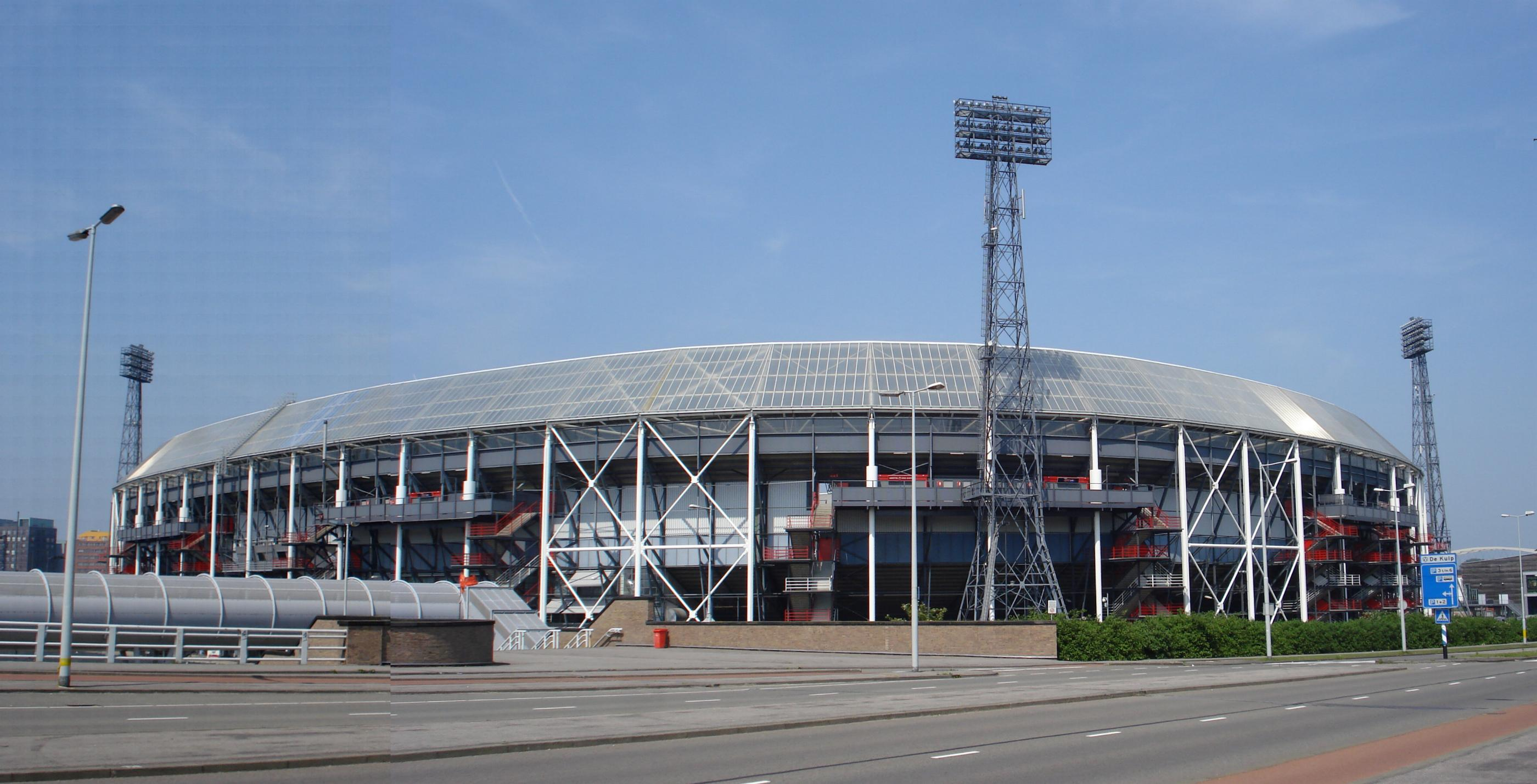
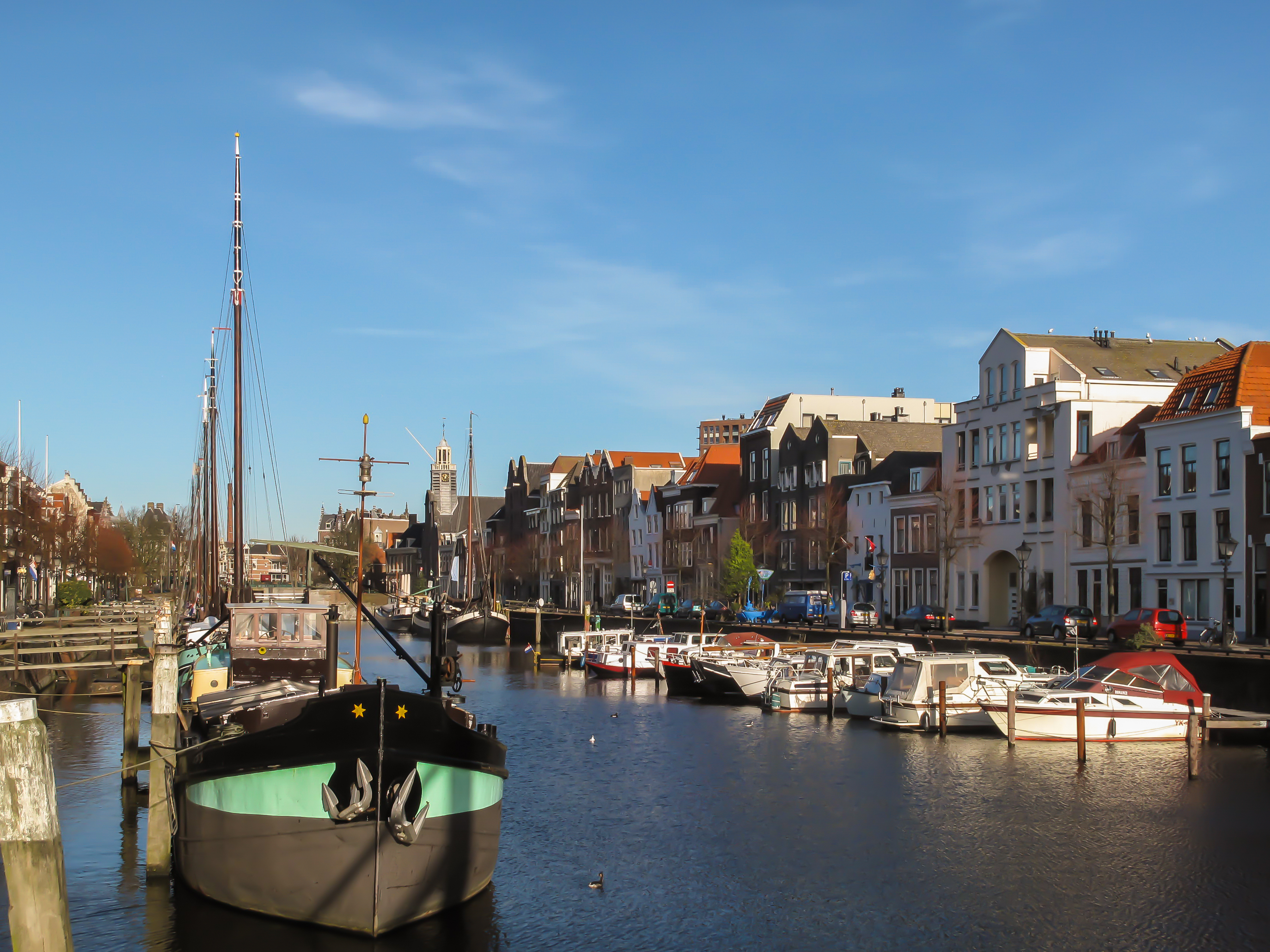
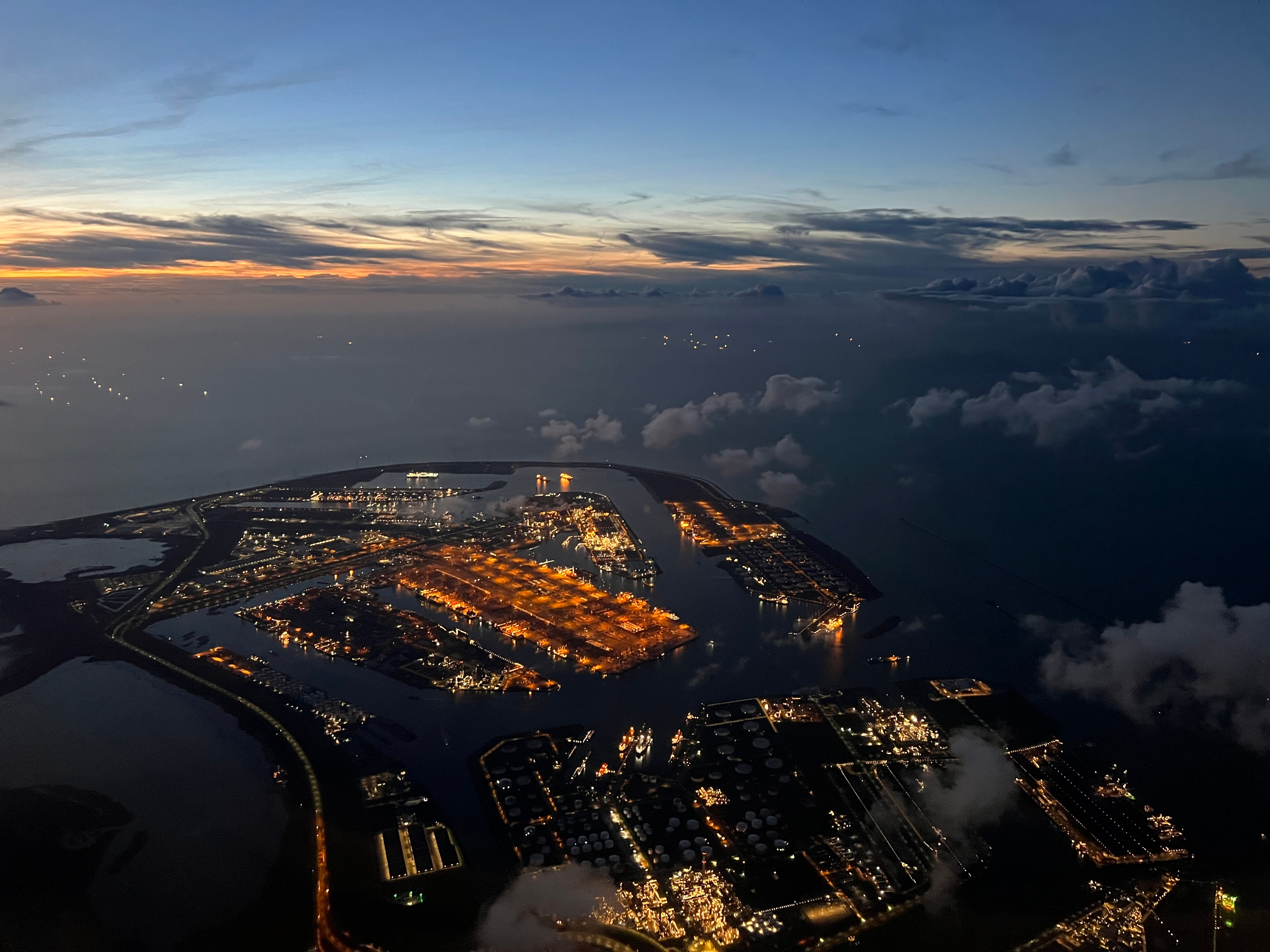
- Rotterdam skyline Lawrence Church The Destroyed City Euromast Cube houses De Kuip Historic town centre of Delfshaven Port of Rotterdam

- Flag Coat of arms Brandmark
- Nicknames: Rotown, Roffa, Nultien, 010
- Motto: Sterker door strijd (Stronger through struggle)
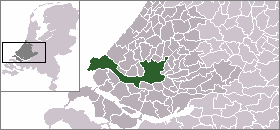
- Location in South Holland
- Interactive map of Rotterdam
- Location within South Holland Location within Netherlands Location within Europe
- Coordinates: 51.92°N 4.48°E
- Country: Netherlands
- Province: South Holland
- Districts: Fourteen: Centrum; Charlois; Delfshaven; Feijenoord; Hillegersberg-Schiebroek; Hoogvliet; Hook of Holland; IJsselmonde; Kralingen-Crooswijk; Noord; Overschie; Pernis; Prins Alexander; Rozenburg

Government
  - Body: Municipal council
  - Mayor: Carola Schouten (CU)
  - Aldermen: List: Jeroen Postma (Pro); Sabine Biesheuvel Pro; Miriam Harika Pro; Astrid Kockelkoren Pro; Chantal Zeegers (D66); Joan Nunnely D66; Diederik van Dommelen (VVD); Tim Versnel VVD; Renee Seegers-Hoogendoorn (CDA); Luuc Dekkers (Volt)

Area
  - Municipality: 324.14 km^{2} (125.15 sq mi)
  - Land: 217.55 km^{2} (84.00 sq mi)
  - Water: 106.59 km^{2} (41.15 sq mi)
  - Randstad: 3,043 km^{2} (1,175 sq mi)

Population (2026)
  - Municipality: 674,485
  - Rank: 2nd in Netherlands; 2nd (Agglomeration); 1st (Metro)
  - Density: 2,995/km^{2} (7,760/sq mi)
  - Urban: 1,031,000
  - Metro (Rotterdam-The Hague): 2,700,000
  - Locality/City: 868,135
- Demonym: Rotterdammer

GDP
  - Randstad: €602.711 billion (2024)
- Time zone: UTC+1 (CET)
  - Summer (DST): UTC+2 (CEST)
- Postcode: 3000–3099
- Area code: 010
- Website: www.rotterdam.nl (in Dutch)

Rotterdam (/ˈrɒtərdæm/ ROT-ər-dam, UK also /ˌrɒtərˈdæm/ ROT-ər-DAM; Dutch: [ˌrɔtərˈdɑm]) is the second-largest city in the Netherlands by population and the largest by area (319.4 km^{2}). It is in the province of South Holland, part of the North Sea mouth of the Rhine–Meuse–Scheldt delta, via the New Meuse inland shipping channel, dug to connect to the Meuse at first and now to the Rhine.

Rotterdam's history goes back to 1270, when a dam was constructed in the Rotte. In 1340, Rotterdam was granted city rights by William IV, Count of Holland. The Rotterdam–The Hague metropolitan area, with a population of approximately 2.7 million, is the 10th-largest in the European Union and the most populous in the country.

A major logistic and economic centre, Rotterdam is Europe's largest seaport. In 2022, Rotterdam had a population of 655,468 and is home to over 180 different nationalities.

Rotterdam is known for its university, riverside setting, lively cultural life, maritime heritage and modern architecture. The near-complete destruction of the city centre during the World War II German bombing has resulted in a varied architectural landscape, including skyscrapers designed by architects such as Rem Koolhaas, Piet Blom and Ben van Berkel.

The Rhine, Meuse and Scheldt give waterway access into the heart of Western Europe, including the highly industrialized Ruhr. The extensive distribution system including rail, roads, and waterways have earned Rotterdam the nicknames "Gateway to Europe" and "Gateway to the World".

== History ==
=== Early history ===
Map of Rotterdam by Frederick de Wit (c. 1690)

The settlement at the lower end of the fen stream Rotte (or Rotta, as it was then known, from rot, "muddy", and a, "water", thus "muddy water") dates from at least the year 950. Around 1150, large floods in the area ended development, leading to the construction of protective dikes and dams, including Schielands Hoge Zeedijk ("Schieland's High Sea Dike") along the northern banks of the present-day Nieuwe Maas river. A dam on the Rotte was built in the 1260s and was located at the present-day Hoogstraat.

On 7 July 1340, Count Willem IV of Holland granted city rights to Rotterdam, which then had a population of only a few thousand. Around the year 1350, a shipping canal (the Rotterdamse Schie) was completed, which provided Rotterdam access to the larger towns in the north, allowing it to become a local trans-shipment centre between the Netherlands, England and Germany, and to urbanize. However, the economy of Rotterdam was mainly based on herring fishing until the Eighty Years' War, when it turned out that it is one of the few Dutch towns with an easy sea access. As a result, William the Silent built new fortifications around Rotterdam.

Beginning in the 1600s, Rotterdam was involved in the Atlantic slave trade. According to historian Gerhard de Kok, "Rotterdam merchants were the pioneers of the Dutch slave trade". From the 17th century until 1814, when the United Netherlands abolished the Netherlands' involvement in the slave trade at the request of the British government, Dutch slave ships from Rotterdam sailed to Africa and the Americas as part of the triangular trade. Rotterdam merchants also sold significant quantities of gunpowder to Zeeland-based slave ships.

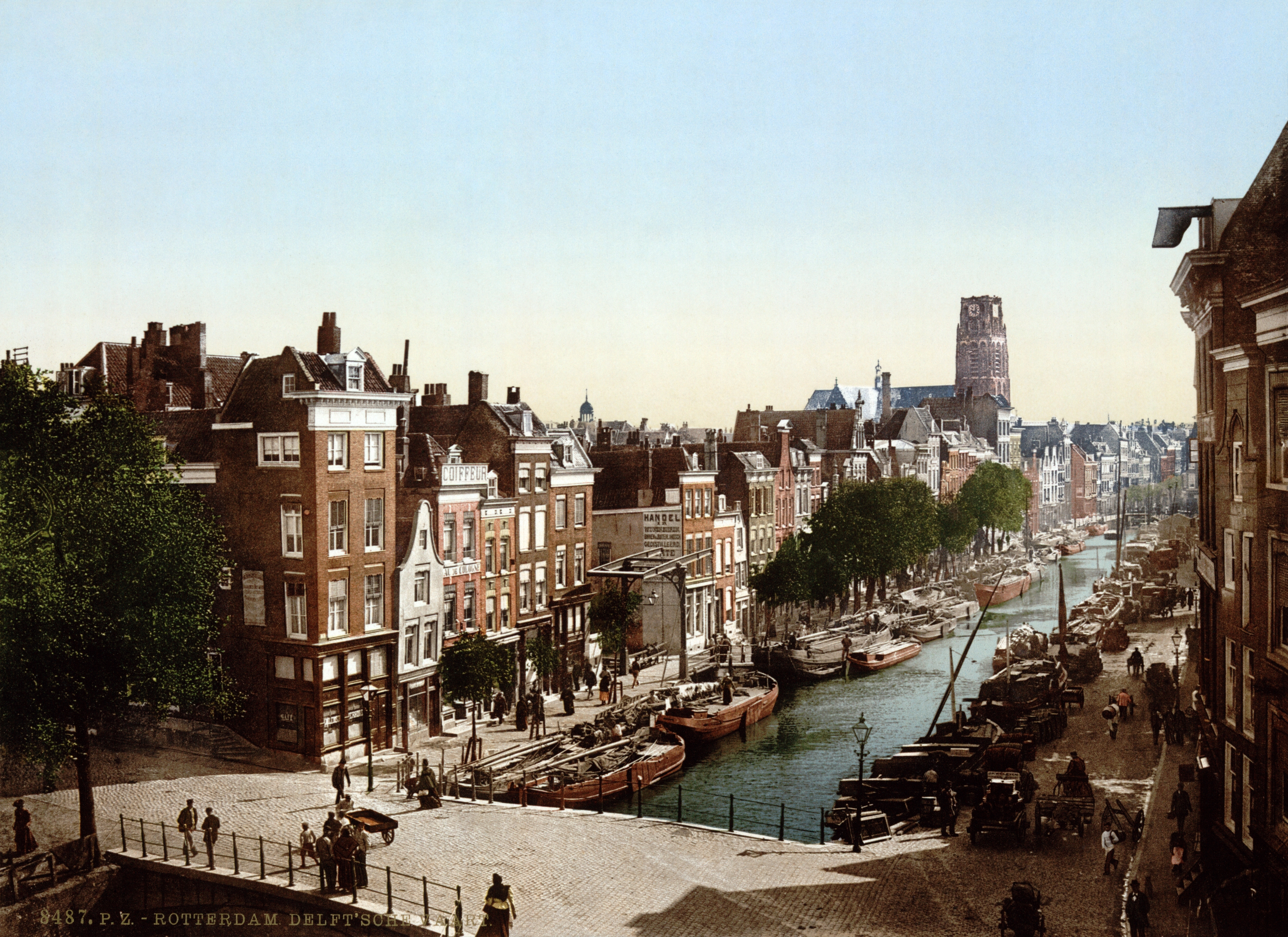
The Delftsevaart, c. 1890–1905

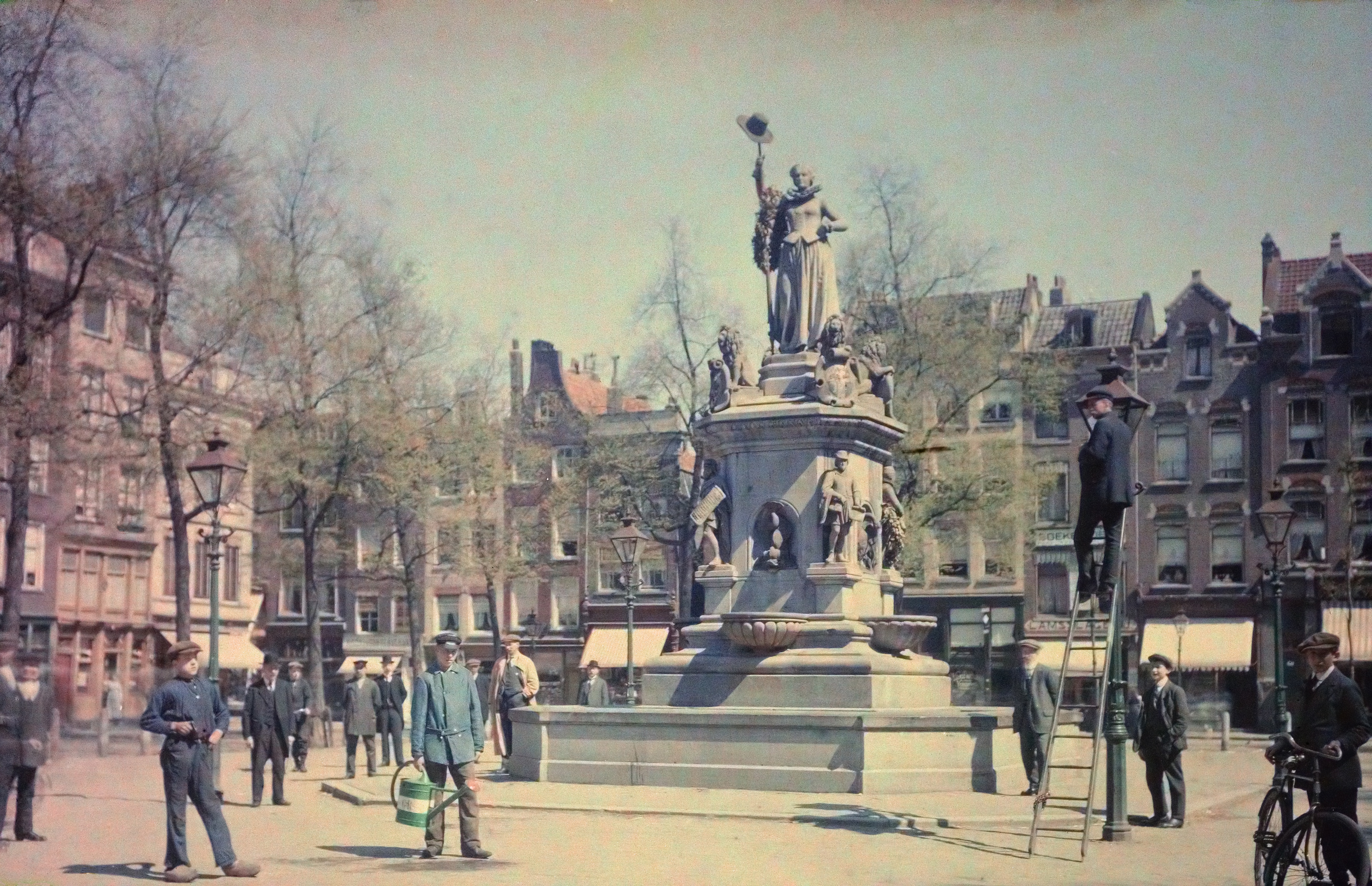
Nieuwe Markt, 1915

The port of Rotterdam grew steadily in importance, the new harbours were built, and Rotterdam became the seat of one of the six chambers of the Vereenigde Oostindische Compagnie (VOC), the Dutch East India Company, and one of the five chambers of the West-Indische Compagnie (WIC), the Dutch West India Company. In the 17th century, the city grew beyond the fortifications, and by the 1670s, its population was around 30,000.

The greatest spurt of growth, both in port activity and population, followed the completion of the Nieuwe Waterweg in 1872. The city and harbour started to expand on the south bank of the river. The Witte Huis, or White House skyscraper, inspired by American office buildings and built in 1898 in the French Art Nouveau style, is evidence of Rotterdam's rapid growth and success. When completed, it was the tallest office building in Europe, with a height of 45 m (147.64 ft).

=== 20th century ===
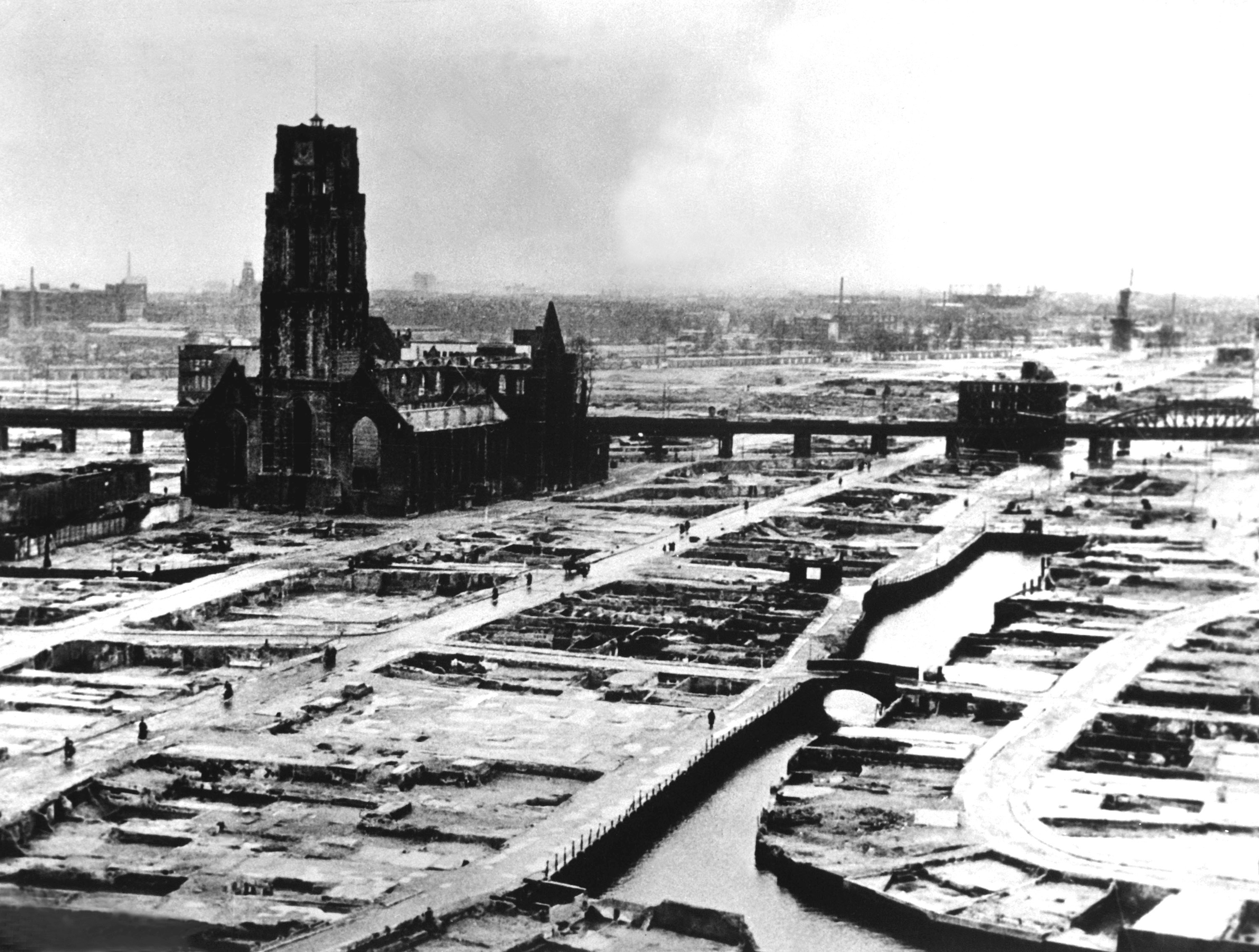
Rotterdam centre after the 1940 bombing of Rotterdam. The ruined St. Lawrence Church has been restored.

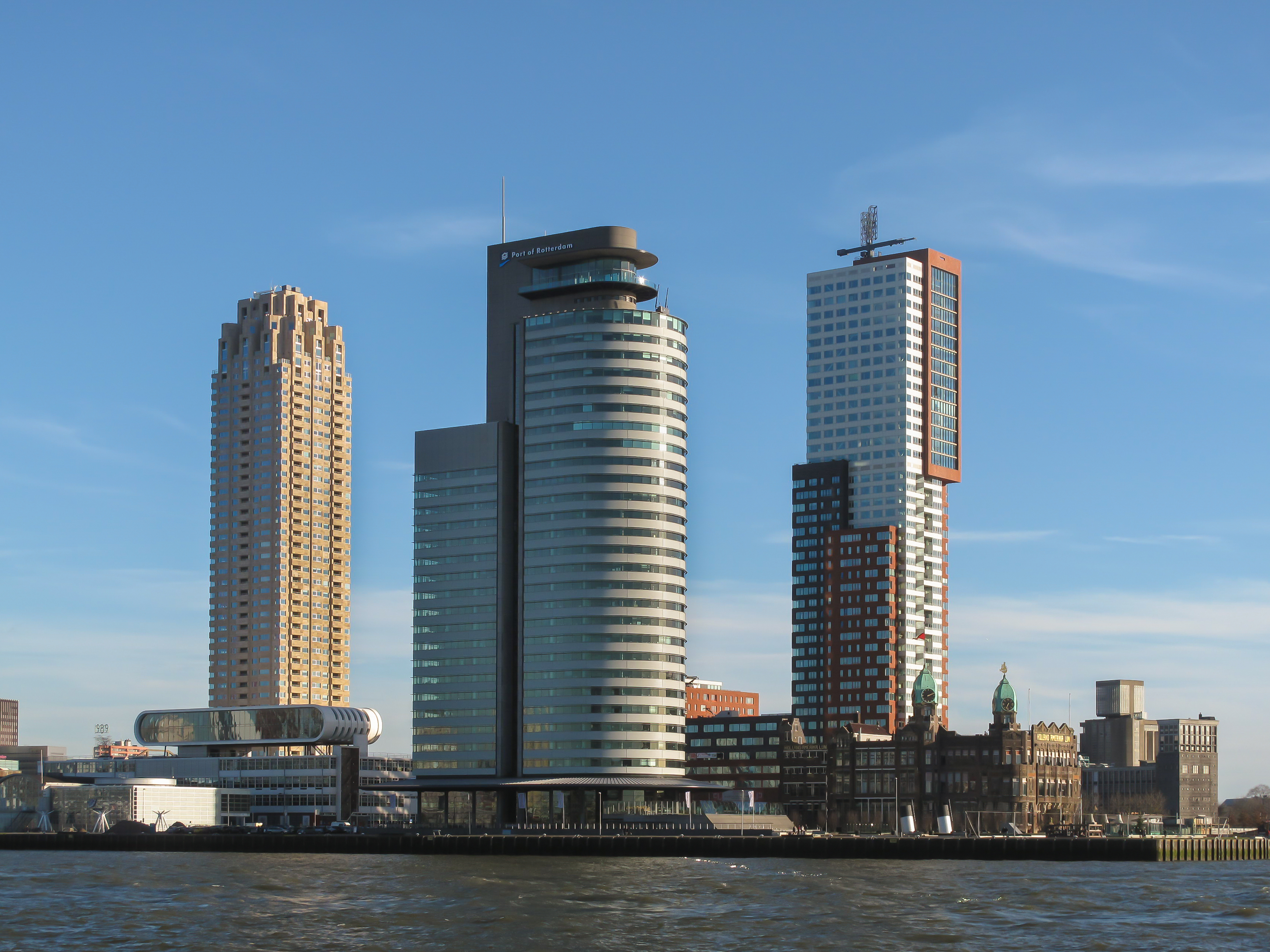
Tower blocks in the Kop van Zuid neighbourhood

During World War I, the city was the world's largest spy centre because of Dutch neutrality and its strategic location between Britain, Germany and German-occupied Belgium. Many spies who were arrested and executed in Britain were led by German secret agents operating from Rotterdam. MI6 had its main European office on de Boompjes. From there the British coordinated espionage in Germany and occupied Belgium. During World War I, an average of 25,000 Belgian refugees lived in the city, as well as hundreds of German deserters and escaped Allied prisoners of war.

During World War II, the German army invaded the Netherlands on 10 May 1940. Adolf Hitler had hoped to conquer the country in just one day, but his forces met unexpectedly fierce resistance. The Dutch army was forced to capitulate on 15 May 1940, following the bombing of Rotterdam on 14 May and the threat of bombing other Dutch cities. The heart of Rotterdam was almost completely destroyed by the Luftwaffe. Some 80,000 civilians were made homeless, and 900 were killed; a relatively low number since many had fled the city because of the warfare and bombing going on in Rotterdam since the start of the invasion three days earlier. The City Hall survived the bombing. Ossip Zadkine later attempted to capture the event with his statue De Verwoeste Stad ('The Destroyed City'). The statue stands near the Leuvehaven, not far from the Erasmusbrug in the centre of the city, on the north shore of the river Nieuwe Maas. In 1941, 11,000 Jews still lived in Rotterdam. Before the war there were 13,000. Between 30 July 1942 and 22 April 1943, 6,790 people were deported in 8 transports via Loods 24. The vast majority of the Jews who were deported via Loods 24 were murdered in Sobibór and Auschwitz-Birkenau. Research in 2000 showed that 144 people survived the deportations. In 2013 the Jewish Children's Monument was unveiled.

In January 1948, Queen Wilhelmina presented the motto 'Sterker door strijd' (Stronger through effort) as part of the coat of arms of Rotterdam to the city government:

"...to serve as a record of the wartime experiences of Rotterdam residents and their role in national liberation..."

—Wilhelmina of the Netherlands

Rotterdam was gradually rebuilt from the 1950s through to the 1970s. Because the city centre was largely destroyed, new spatial infrastructure could be built, making it an open and modern city. In 1953 the Lijnbaan was opened, the first car-free shopping street in Europe. The progressive design attracted a lot of international attention, in which film and television played an important role. The new Central Station was completed in 1957, with the Groothandelsgebouw from 1953 next to it. The Euromast was erected in 1960 on the occasion of the Floriade. From the 1980s onwards, the city councils began developing an active architectural policy. The harbours were moving westwards, and the old environment had to be reshaped. Daring and new styles of apartments, office buildings and recreation facilities resulted in a more 'livable' city centre with a new skyline. In the 1990s, the Kop van Zuid was built on the south bank of the river as a new business centre. Rotterdam was voted 2015 European City of the Year by the Academy of Urbanism. A profile of Rem Koolhaas in The Guardian begins, "If you put the last 50 years of architecture in a blender, and spat it out in building-sized chunks across the skyline, you would probably end up with something that looked a bit like Rotterdam".

== Geography ==
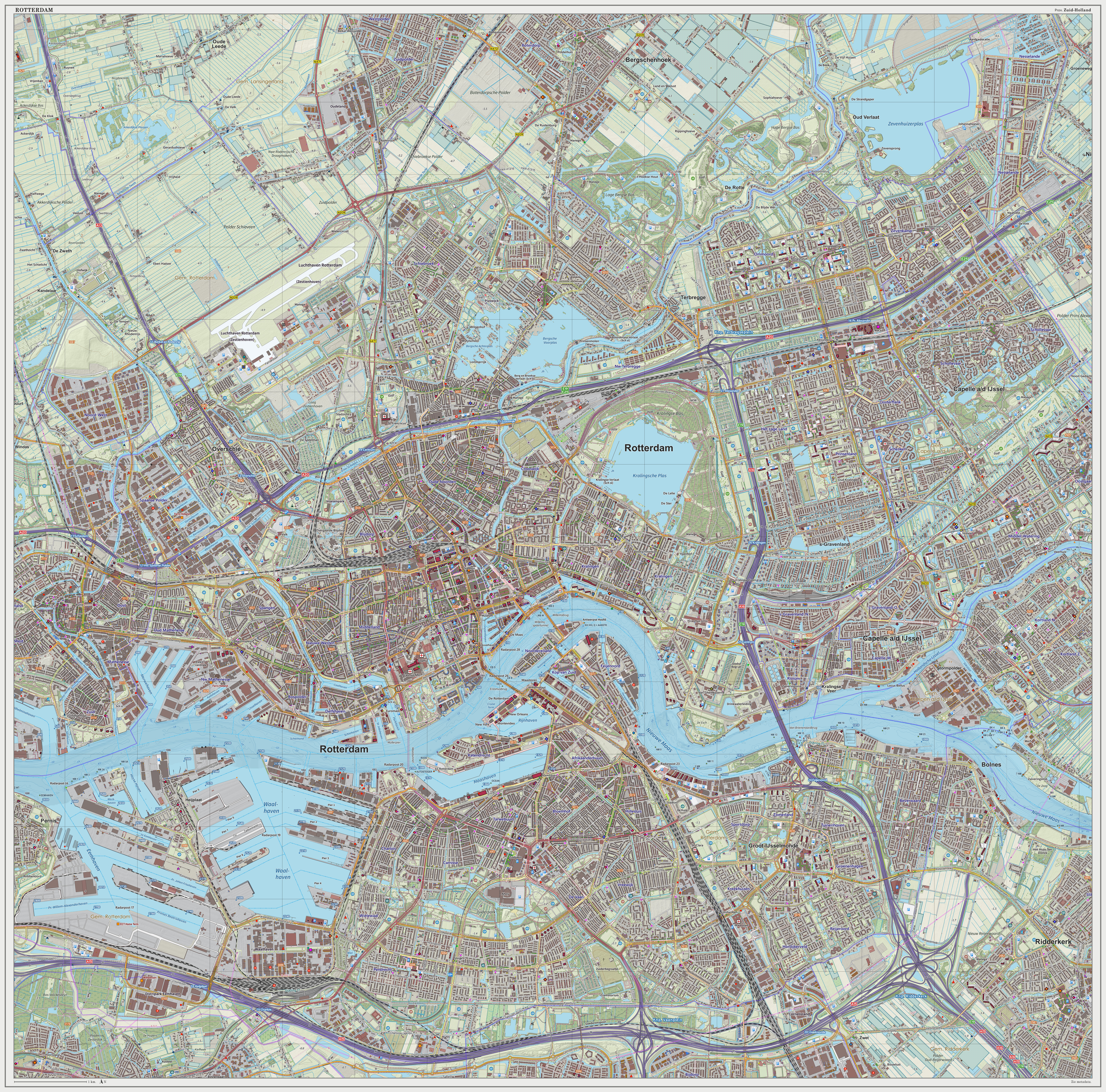
Topographic map image of Rotterdam (city), as of September 2014

Rotterdam is divided into a northern and a southern part by the river Nieuwe Maas, connected by (from west to east): the Beneluxtunnel; the Maastunnel; the Erasmusbrug; a subway tunnel; the Willemsspoortunnel ('Willems railway tunnel'); the Willemsbrug ('Willems Bridge') together with the Koninginnebrug ('Queen's Bridge'); and the Van Brienenoordbrug ('Van Brienenoord Bridge'). The former railway lift bridge De Hef ('the Lift') is preserved as a Rijksmonument (national heritage site) in lifted position between the Noordereiland ('North Island') and the south of Rotterdam.

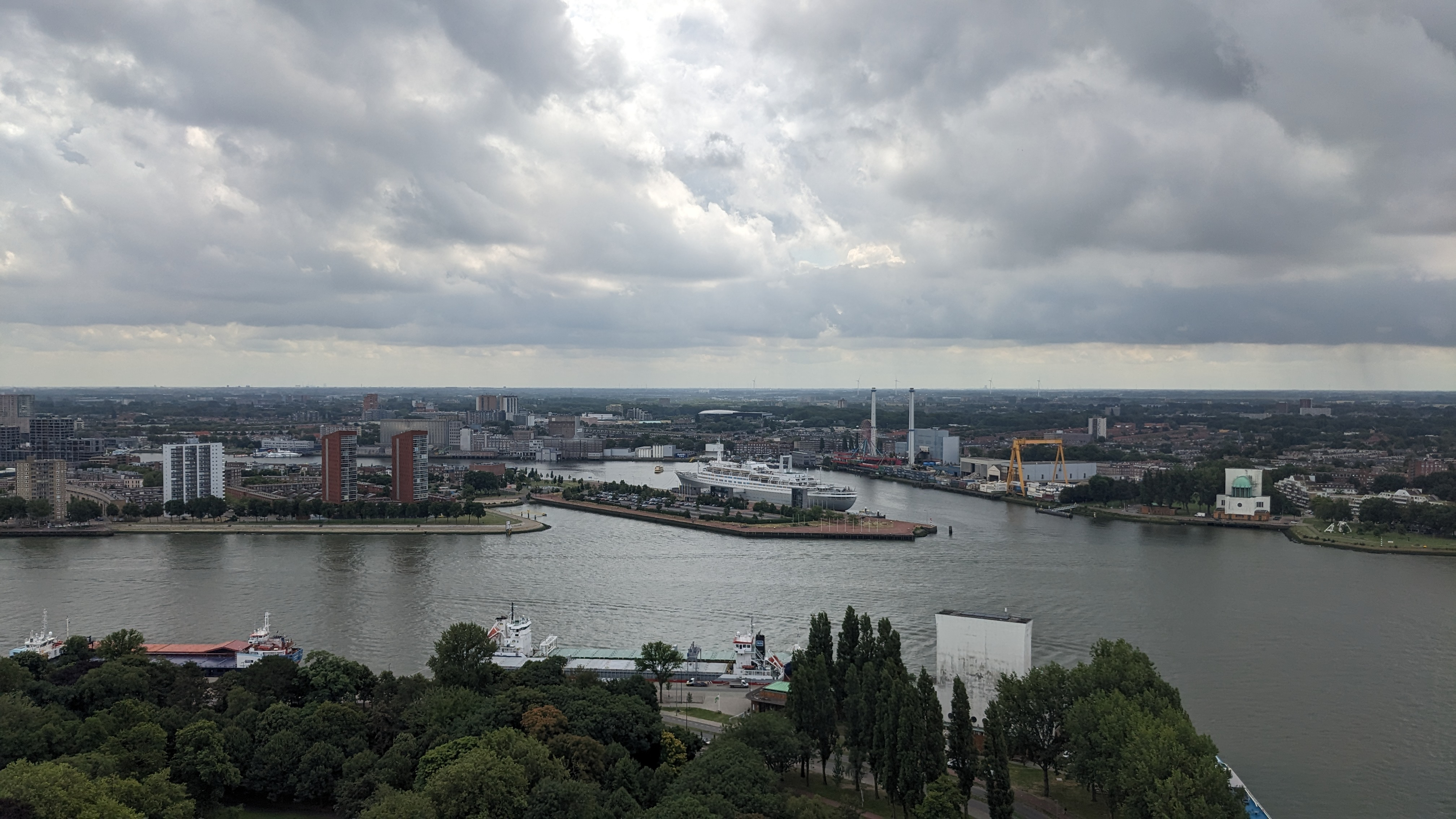
View of Rotterdam from the Euromast

The city centre is located on the northern bank of the Nieuwe Maas, although recent urban development has extended the centre to parts of southern Rotterdam known as Kop van Zuid ('the Head of South', i.e., the northern part of southern Rotterdam). From its inland core, Rotterdam reaches the North Sea by a swathe of predominantly harbour area.

Built mostly behind dikes, large parts of Rotterdam are below sea level. For instance, the Prins Alexander Polder in the northeast of Rotterdam extends 6 m (20 ft) below sea level, or rather below Normaal Amsterdams Peil (NAP) or 'Amsterdam Ordnance Datum'. The lowest point in the Netherlands (6.76 m (22.2 ft) below NAP) is situated just to the east of Rotterdam, in the municipality of Nieuwerkerk aan den IJssel.

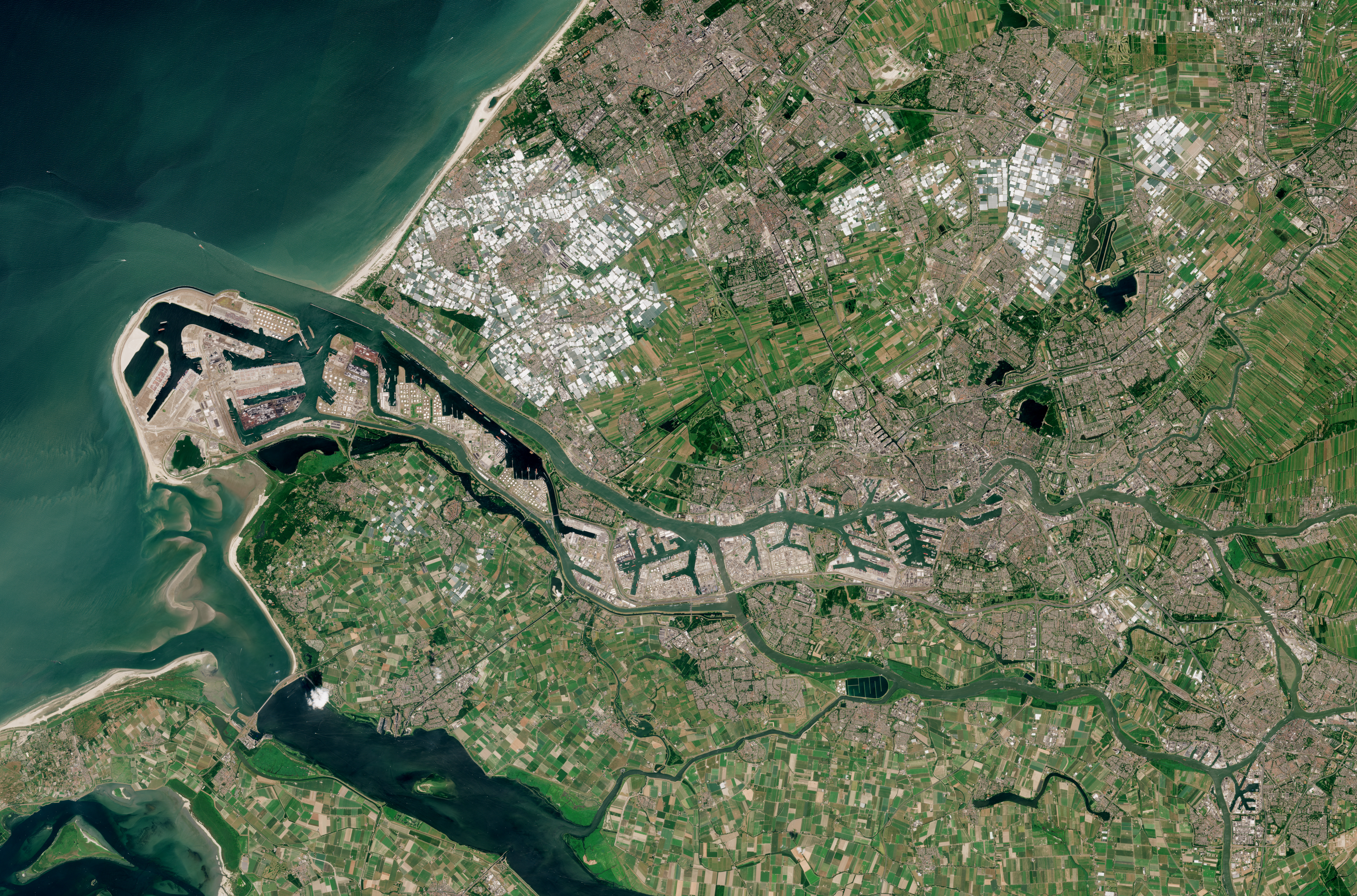
Satellite image of Rotterdam and its port

The Rotte river no longer joins the Nieuwe Maas directly. Since the early 1980s, when the construction of Rotterdam's second underground line interfered with the Rotte's course, its waters have been pumped through a pipe into the Nieuwe Maas via the Boerengat.

The 24 municipalities of the Rotterdam–The Hague metropolitan area

Between the summers of 2003 and 2008, an artificial beach was created at the Boompjeskade along the Nieuwe Maas, between the Erasmus Bridge and the Willems Bridge. Swimming was not possible; digging pits was limited to the height of the layer of sand, about 50 cm (20 in). Alternatively, people go to the beach of Hook of Holland (which is a Rotterdam district) or one of the beaches in Zeeland: Renesse or the Zuid-Hollandse Eilanden: Ouddorp, Oostvoorne.

Rotterdam forms the centre of the Rijnmond conurbation, bordering the conurbation surrounding The Hague to the northwest. The two conurbations are close enough to be a single conurbation. They share the Rotterdam The Hague Airport and a light rail system called RandstadRail. Consideration is being given to creating an official Metropolitan region Rotterdam The Hague (Metropoolregio Rotterdam Den Haag), which would have a combined population approaching 2.5 million.

In its turn, the Rijnmond conurbation is part of the southern wing (the Zuidvleugel) of the Randstad, which is one of the most important economic and densely populated areas in the northwest of Europe. Having a population of 7.1 million, the Randstad is the sixth-largest urban area in Europe (after Moscow, London, Paris, Istanbul, and the Rhein-Ruhr Area). The Zuidvleugel, situated in the province of South Holland, has a population of around 3 million.

=== Climate ===
Rotterdam experiences a temperate oceanic climate (Köppen climate classification Cfb) similar to all of the coastal areas in the Netherlands. Located near to the coast, its climate is slightly milder than locations further inland. Winters are cool with frequent cold days, while the summers are mild to warm, with occasional hot temperatures. Temperature rises above 30 °C on average 4 days each summer, while (night) temperatures can drop below −5 °C during winter for short periods of time, mostly during periods of sustained easterly (continental) winds. Precipitation is generally moderate throughout the year, although spring and summer (particularly before August) are relatively drier and sunnier, while autumn and winter are cloudier with more frequent rain (or snow). The following climate data is from the airport, which is slightly cooler than the city, being surrounded by water canals which make the climate milder and with a higher relative humidity. The city has an urban heat island, especially inside the city centre.

Climate data for Rotterdam (1991–2020 normals), extremes 1956–present
| Month | Jan | Feb | Mar | Apr | May | Jun | Jul | Aug | Sep | Oct | Nov | Dec | Year |
|---|---|---|---|---|---|---|---|---|---|---|---|---|---|
| Record high °C (°F) | 14.2 (57.6) | 18.7 (65.7) | 23.8 (74.8) | 28.7 (83.7) | 32.7 (90.9) | 36.6 (97.9) | 37.2 (99.0) | 36.1 (97.0) | 32.5 (90.5) | 26.0 (78.8) | 19.3 (66.7) | 15.6 (60.1) | 38.9 (102.0) |
| Mean maximum °C (°F) | 11.9 (53.4) | 12.7 (54.9) | 16.9 (62.4) | 22.4 (72.3) | 26.2 (79.2) | 29.2 (84.6) | 30.7 (87.3) | 30.1 (86.2) | 25.4 (77.7) | 20.9 (69.6) | 15.6 (60.1) | 12.5 (54.5) | 32.6 (90.7) |
| Mean daily maximum °C (°F) | 6.4 (43.5) | 7.1 (44.8) | 10.3 (50.5) | 14.3 (57.7) | 17.9 (64.2) | 20.6 (69.1) | 22.7 (72.9) | 22.6 (72.7) | 19.3 (66.7) | 14.9 (58.8) | 10.2 (50.4) | 7.0 (44.6) | 14.4 (57.9) |
| Daily mean °C (°F) | 4.0 (39.2) | 4.4 (39.9) | 6.7 (44.1) | 9.7 (49.5) | 13.2 (55.8) | 16.0 (60.8) | 18.2 (64.8) | 18.0 (64.4) | 14.8 (58.6) | 10.9 (51.6) | 7.0 (44.6) | 4.1 (39.4) | 10.7 (51.3) |
| Mean daily minimum °C (°F) | 1.3 (34.3) | 1.1 (34.0) | 2.4 (36.3) | 4.8 (40.6) | 8.1 (46.6) | 11.0 (51.8) | 13.2 (55.8) | 12.9 (55.2) | 10.5 (50.9) | 7.2 (45.0) | 3.9 (39.0) | 1.4 (34.5) | 6.7 (44.1) |
| Mean minimum °C (°F) | −6.5 (20.3) | −5.8 (21.6) | −3.6 (25.5) | −1.7 (28.9) | 1.7 (35.1) | 5.5 (41.9) | 8.6 (47.5) | 8.4 (47.1) | 5.4 (41.7) | 1.0 (33.8) | −2.3 (27.9) | −5.4 (22.3) | −9.0 (15.8) |
| Record low °C (°F) | −17.1 (1.2) | −16.5 (2.3) | −13.4 (7.9) | −6.0 (21.2) | −1.4 (29.5) | 0.5 (32.9) | 3.6 (38.5) | 4.6 (40.3) | 0.4 (32.7) | −5.1 (22.8) | −9.0 (15.8) | −13.3 (8.1) | −17.1 (1.2) |
| Average precipitation mm (inches) | 71 (2.8) | 66 (2.6) | 57 (2.2) | 42 (1.7) | 56 (2.2) | 69 (2.7) | 79 (3.1) | 92 (3.6) | 90 (3.5) | 87 (3.4) | 88 (3.5) | 86 (3.4) | 882 (34.7) |
| Average precipitation days (≥ 1 mm) | 12 | 10 | 12 | 9 | 9 | 10 | 10 | 10 | 12 | 12 | 13 | 13 | 131 |
| Average snowy days | 6 | 5 | 4 | 2 | 0 | 0 | 0 | 0 | 0 | 0 | 2 | 4 | 22 |
| Average relative humidity (%) | 88 | 85 | 83 | 78 | 77 | 79 | 79 | 80 | 84 | 86 | 89 | 89 | 83 |
| Mean monthly sunshine hours | 69.6 | 89.9 | 143.4 | 192.9 | 226.2 | 216.0 | 221.2 | 202.5 | 152.9 | 115.1 | 66.8 | 55.5 | 1,752 |
Source 1: Royal Netherlands Meteorological Institute (1991–2020 normals, snowy days normals for 1971–2000)
Source 2: Royal Netherlands Meteorological Institute (1971–2000 extremes) Infoclimat

== Demographics ==
Historical population

| Year | Pop. | ±% p.a. |
|---|---|---|
| 1398 | 2,500 | — |
| 1477 | 5,738 | +1.06% |
| 1494 | 4,374 | −1.58% |
| 1514 | 5,116 | +0.79% |
| 1622 | 19,532 | +1.25% |
| 1632 | 29,500 | +4.21% |
| 1665 | 40,000 | +0.93% |
| 1732 | 56,000 | +0.50% |
| 1795 | 53,212 | −0.08% |
| 1830 | 72,300 | +0.88% |
| 1849 | 90,100 | +1.17% |

| Year | Pop. | ±% p.a. |
|---|---|---|
| 1879 | 148,100 | +1.67% |
| 1899 | 318,500 | +3.90% |
| 1925 | 547,900 | +2.11% |
| 1950 | 679,005 | +0.86% |
| 1960 | 733,693 | +0.78% |
| 1970 | 697,469 | −0.51% |
| 1980 | 594,027 | −1.59% |
| 1990 | 593,339 | −0.01% |
| 2000 | 606,021 | +0.21% |
| 2010 | 605,543 | −0.01% |
| 2020 | 651,157 | +0.73% |

Source: Lourens & Lucassen 1997, pp. 116–117 (1398–1795)
Statistics Netherlands

Rotterdam population pyramid in 2022

Top 15 countries of birth of parents of residents in 2025
| Country/Territory | Population |
|---|---|
| Netherlands | 287,754 |
| Suriname | 51,667 |
| Turkey | 49,214 |
| Morocco | 47,260 |
| Curaçao | 23,601 |
| Cape Verde | 14,907 |
| Poland | 13,505 |
| Indonesia | 11.228 |
| Germany | 9,635 |
| (Socialist Federal Republic of Yugoslavia) Ex-Yugoslavia | 9,569 |
| China | 8,803 |
| Syria | 8,448 |
| Pakistan | 5.758 |
| Bulgaria | 5,378 |
| Portugal | 5,109 |

Rotterdam is diverse, with the demographics differing by neighbourhood. The city centre has a disproportionately high number of single people when compared to other cities, with 70% of the population between the ages of 20 and 40 identifying as single. Those with higher education and higher income live disproportionately in the city centre, as do foreign-born citizens.

=== Composition ===
The municipality of Rotterdam is part of the Rotterdam–The Hague metropolitan area, which, as of 2015, covers an area of 1,130 km^{2}, of which 990 km km^{2} is land, and has a population of approximately 2,563,197. As of 2019, the municipality itself occupies an area of 325.79 km^{2}, 208.80 km^{2} of which is land, and is home to 638,751 inhabitants. Its population peaked at 731,564 in 1965, but the dual processes of suburbanization and counterurbanization saw this number steadily decline over the next 2 decades, reaching 560,000 by 1985. Although Rotterdam has experienced population growth since then, it has done so at a slower pace than comparable cities in the Netherlands, like Amsterdam, The Hague and Utrecht.

Rotterdam consists of 14 submunicipalities: Centrum, Charlois (including Heijplaat), Delfshaven, Feijenoord, Hillegersberg-Schiebroek, Hook of Holland, Hoogvliet, IJsselmonde, Kralingen-Crooswijk, Noord, Overschie, Pernis, and Prins Alexander (the most populous submunicipality with around 85,000 inhabitants). One other area, Rozenburg, has had an official submunicipality status since 18 March 2010. Since the status of a submunicipality was lifted on 19 March 2014, it has become an integral part of the municipality of Rotterdam.

The size of the municipality of Rotterdam is the result of the amalgamation of the following former municipalities, some of which were submunicipalities prior to 19 March 2014:

- Delfshaven (added on 30 January 1886)
- Charlois (added on 28 February 1895)
- Kralingen (added on 28 February 1895)
- Hoogvliet (added on 1 May 1934)
- Pernis (added on 1 May 1934)
- Hillegersberg (added on 1 August 1941)
- IJsselmonde (added on 1 August 1941)
- Overschie (added on 1 August 1941)
- Schiebroek (added on 1 August 1941)
- Rozenburg (added on 18 March 2010)

=== Origin background makeup ===
In the Netherlands, Rotterdam has the highest percentage of residents with a recent migration background from non-industrialised nations. They form a large part of Rotterdam's multi-ethnic and multicultural diversity. 52.9% of the population have at least one parent born outside the country. There are 80,000 Muslims, constituting 13% of the population in 2010. The former mayor of Rotterdam, Ahmed Aboutaleb (2009–2024), is of Moroccan descent and is a practicing Muslim. The city is home to the largest Dutch Antillean community in the Netherlands. The city also has its own Chinatown at the West-Kruiskade, close to Rotterdam Centraal.

Origin
| Background groups | 1996 | | 2000 | | 2005 | | 2010 | | 2015 | | 2020 | |
| Background groups | Numbers | % | Numbers | % | Numbers | % | Numbers | % | Numbers | % | Numbers | % |
| Both parents born in NL | 381,926 | 64.4% | 355,631 | 60% | 327,730 | 55% | 310,190 | 52.3% | 316,085 | 50.7% | 310,526 | 47.69% |
| Western migration background | 55,722 | 9.4% | 56,399 | 9.5% | 59,267 | 9.9% | 63,833 | 10.8% | 74,438 | 11.9% | 87,132 | 13.38% |
| Non-Western migration background | 155,097 | 26.2% | 180,643 | 30.5% | 209,410 | 35.1% | 219,026 | 36.9% | 233,129 | 37.4% | 253,499 | 38.93% |
|---|---|---|---|---|---|---|---|---|---|---|---|---|
| Suriname | | | | | | | | | | | 52,691 | 8.09% |
| Turkey | | | | | | | | | | | 47,933 | 7.36% |
| Morocco | | | | | | | | | | | 45,601 | 7% |
| Netherlands Antilles and Aruba | | | | | | | | | | | 26,390 | 4.05% |
| Indonesia | | | | | | | | | | | 11,677 | 1.79% |
| Total | 592,745 | 100% | 592,673 | 100% | 596,407 | 100% | 593,049 | 100% | 623,652 | 100% | 651,157 | 100% |

=== Religion ===
Religions in Rotterdam (2013)
1. Irreligion (46.7%)
2. Catholic Church (18.7%)
3. Islam (13.1%)
4. Protestant Church in the Netherlands (10.5%)
5. Other Christian denominations (7.10%)
6. Hinduism (3.30%)
7. Buddhism (0.50%)
8. Judaism (0.10%)

Christianity is the largest religion in Rotterdam, with 36.3% of the population identifying. The second- and third-largest religions are Islam (13.1%) and Hinduism (3.3%), while about half of the population has no religious affiliation.

Since 1795 Rotterdam has hosted the chief congregation of the liberal Protestant brotherhood of Remonstrants. From 1955 it has been the seat of the Catholic bishop of Rotterdam when the Rotterdam diocese was split from the Haarlem diocese. Since 2010 the city has been home to the largest mosque in the Netherlands, the Essalam Mosque (capacity 1,500).

== Politics ==
The municipal council consists of 45 members, the largest party is Livable Rotterdam. The municipal executive consists of mayor Carola Schouten and nine elderman, belonging to four parties.

== Economy ==
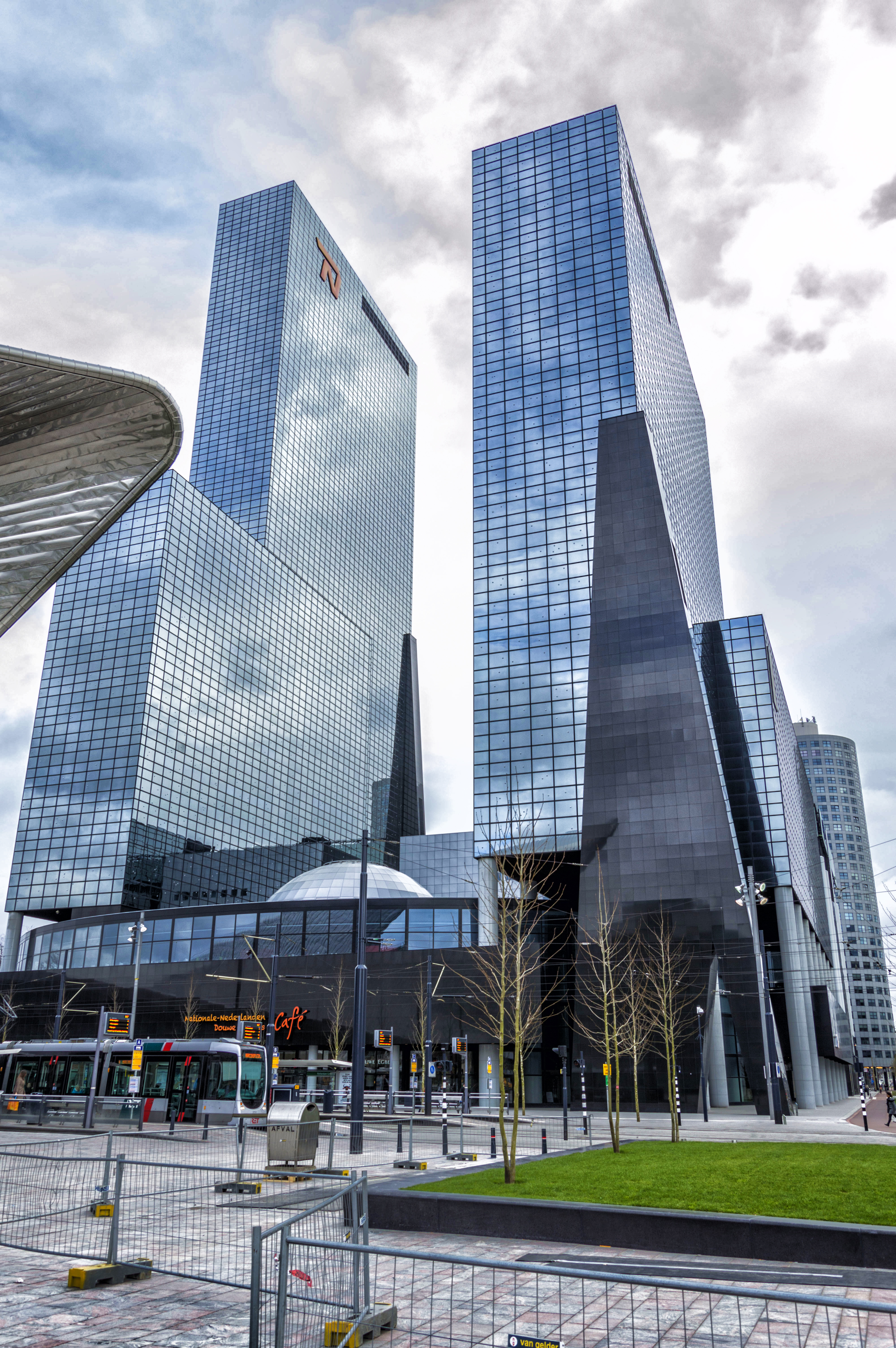
Gebouw Delftse Poort, one of the tallest office buildings in the Netherlands

Rotterdam has always been one of the main centres of the shipping industry in the Netherlands. From the Rotterdam Chamber of the VOC, the world's first multinational, established in 1602, to the merchant shipping leader Royal Nedlloyd, established in 1970, with its corporate headquarters located in the landmark building the 'Willemswerf' in 1988. In 1997, Nedlloyd merged with the British shipping industry leader P&O, forming the third largest merchant shipping company in the world. The Anglo-Dutch P&O Nedlloyd was bought by the Danish giant corporation 'AP Moller Maersk' in 2005, and its Dutch operations are still headquartered in the 'Willemswerf'. Nowadays, well-known companies with headquarters in Rotterdam are consumer goods company Unilever (since 2020 London), asset management firm Robeco, energy company Eneco, dredging company Van Oord, oil company Royal Dutch Shell (since 2021 London), terminal operator Vopak, commodity trading company Vitol and architecture firms MVRDV and Office for Metropolitan Architecture.

It is also home to the regional headquarters of chemical company LyondellBasell, commodities trading company Glencore, pharmaceutical company Pfizer, logistics companies Stolt-Nielsen, electrical equipment company ABB and consumer goods company Procter & Gamble. Furthermore, Rotterdam has the Dutch headquarters of Allianz, Maersk, Petrobras, Samskip, Louis Dreyfus Group, and Aon. The City of Rotterdam makes use of the services of semi-government companies Roteb (to take care of sanitation, waste management and assorted services) and the Port of Rotterdam Authority (to maintain the Port of Rotterdam). Both these companies were once municipal bodies; now they are autonomous entities, owned by the city.

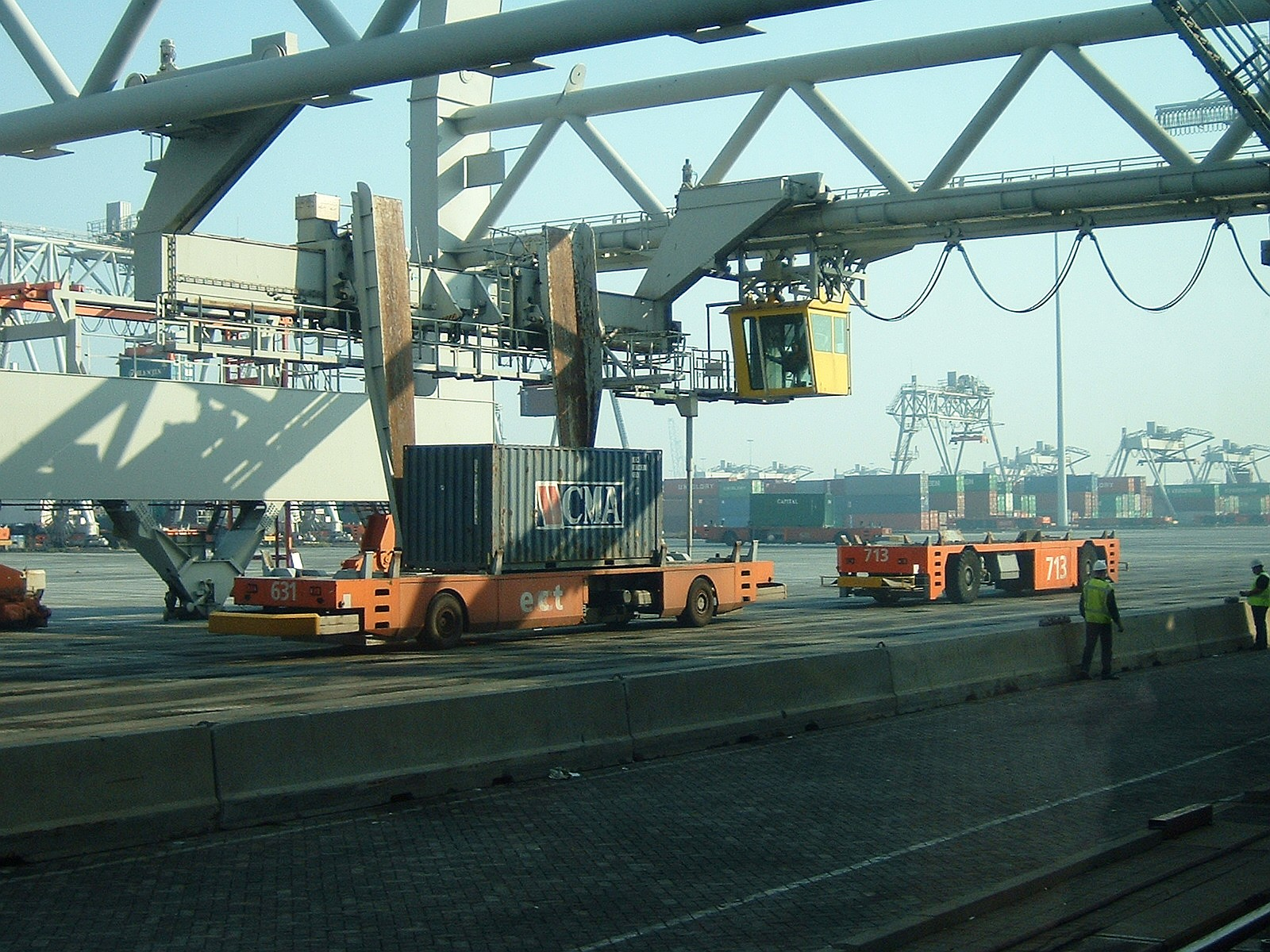
Unmanned vehicles handle containers at Europe Container Terminals (ECT), the largest container terminal operator in Europe.

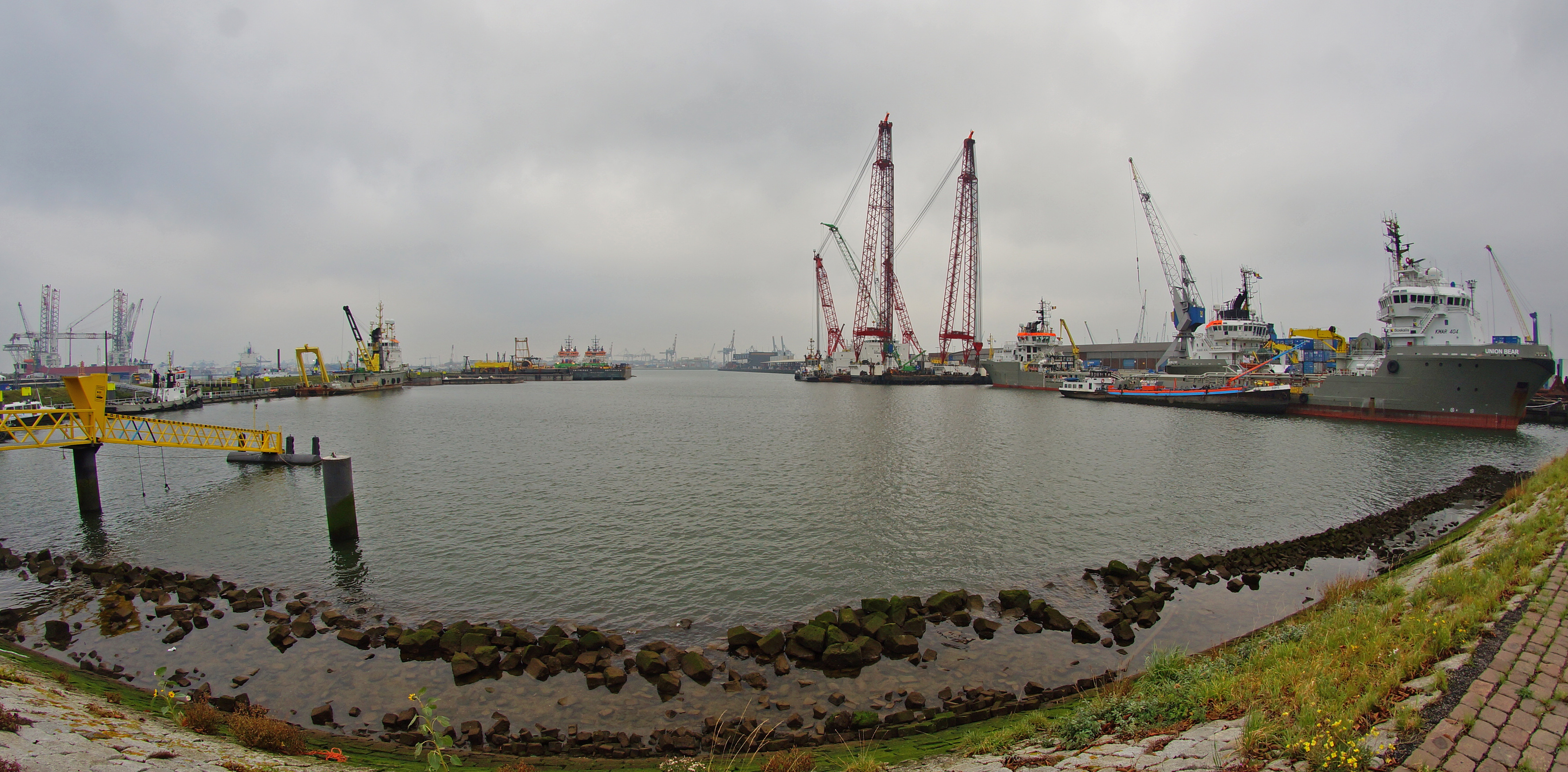
The Waalhaven

Being the largest port and one of the largest cities of the country, Rotterdam attracts many people seeking jobs, especially in the cheap labour segment. The city's unemployment rate is 12%, almost twice the national average. Rotterdam is the largest port in Europe, with the rivers Maas and Rhine providing excellent access to the hinterland upstream, reaching to Basel, Switzerland, and into France. In 2004 Shanghai took over as the world's busiest container port. In 2006, Rotterdam was the world's seventh largest container port in terms of twenty-foot equivalent units (TEU) handled. The port's main activities are petrochemical industries and general cargo handling and transshipment. The harbour functions as an important transit point for bulk materials between the European continent and overseas. From Rotterdam, goods are transported by ship, river barge, train or road. In 2007, the Betuweroute, a new fast freight railway from Rotterdam to Germany, was completed. the port also allows cruiseships to dock.

Well-known streets in Rotterdam are the Lijnbaan (the first set of pedestrian streets of the country, opened in 1953), the Hoogstraat, the Coolsingel with the city hall, which was renovated between 2018 and 2021 giving cyclists and pedestrians more space, meaning that car traffic was reduced from 4 lanes (2 in each direction) to 2 lanes (1 in each direction). Another main street is the Weena, which runs from the Central Station to the Hofplein (square). A modern shopping venue is the Beurstraverse ("Stock Exchange Traverse"), better known by its informal name 'Koopgoot' ('Buying/Shopping Gutter', after its subterranean position), which crosses the Coolsingel below street level. The Kruiskade is a more upscale shopping street, with retailers like Michael Kors, 7 For All Mankind, Calvin Klein, Hugo Boss, Tommy Hilfiger and the Dutch men's clothier Oger. Another upscale shopping venue is a flagship store of department store De Bijenkorf. Located a little more to the east is the Markthal, with lots of small retailers inside. This hall is also one of Rotterdam's famous architectural landmarks. The main shopping venue in the south of Rotterdam is Zuidplein, which lies close to Rotterdam Ahoy, an accommodation centre for shows, exhibitions, sporting events, concerts and congresses. Another prominent shopping centre called Alexandrium lies in the east of Rotterdam. It includes a large kitchen and furniture centre.

== Education ==
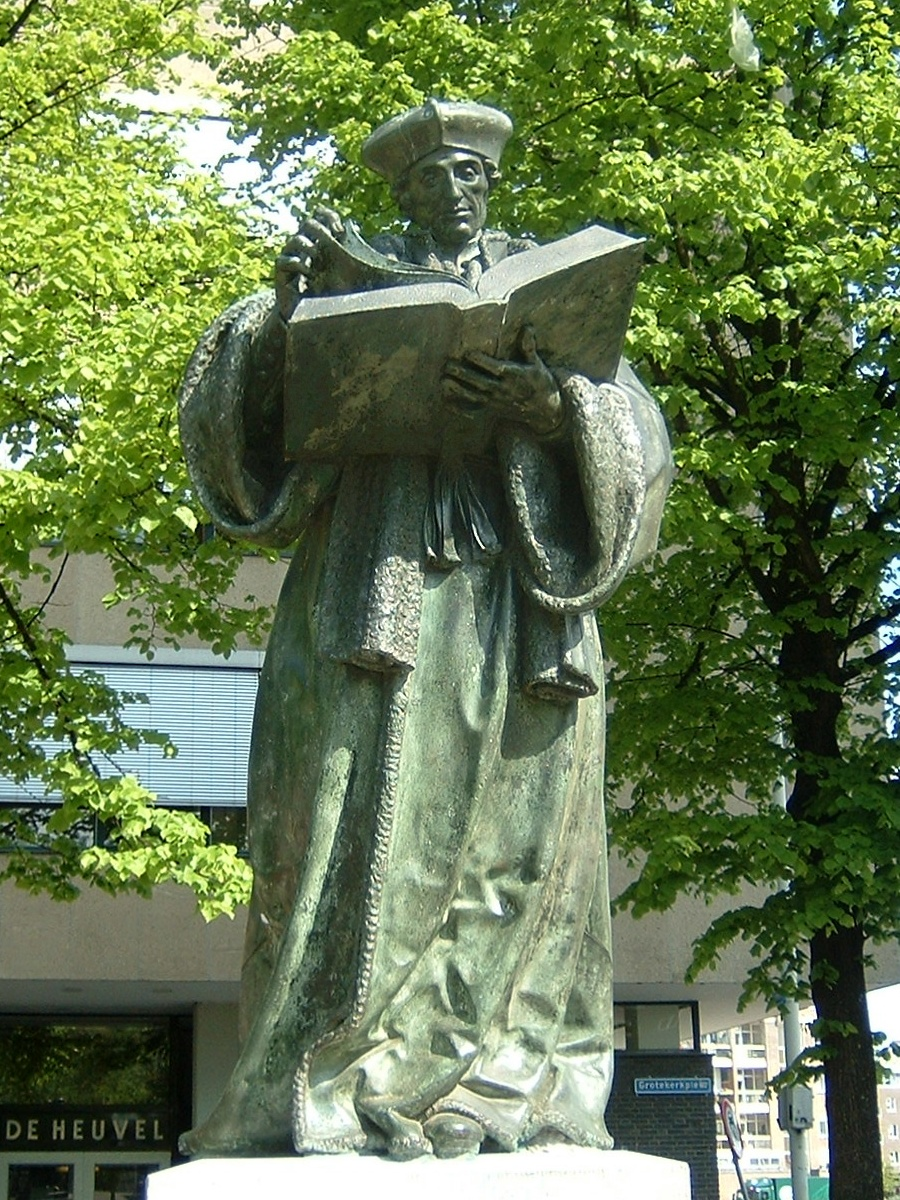
Bronze statue of Erasmus, created by Hendrick de Keyser in 1622

Rotterdam has one major university, the Erasmus University Rotterdam (EUR), named after one of the city's famous former inhabitants, Desiderius Erasmus. The Woudestein campus houses (among others) the Rotterdam School of Management, Erasmus University. In the Financial Times' 2005 rankings, it placed 29th globally and 7th in Europe. In the 2009 rankings of Masters of Management, the school reached first place with the CEMS Master in Management and tenth place with its RSM Master in Management. The university is also home to Europe's largest student association, STAR Study Association Rotterdam School of Management, Erasmus University, and the world's largest student association, AIESEC, has its international office in the city.

The Hoboken campus of EUR houses the Dijkzigt (general) hospital, the Sophia Hospital (for children), the Daniel den Hoed clinic (cancer institute) and the medical department of the university. They are known collectively as the Erasmus Medical Center. This centre is ranked third in Europe by CSIC as a hospital and is also ranked within top 50 universities of the world in the field of medicine (clinical, pre-clinical & health, 2017).

The Willem de Kooning Academy is Rotterdam's main art school, which is part of the Hogeschool Rotterdam. It is regarded as one of the most prestigious art schools in the Netherlands and the number 1 in Advertising and Copywriting. Part of the Willem de Kooning Academy is the Piet Zwart Institute for postgraduate studies and research in Fine Art, Media Design and Retail Design. The Piet Zwart Institute boasts a selective roster of emerging international artists.

Three hogescholen (universities of applied sciences) exist in Rotterdam. These schools award their students a professional bachelor's degree and a postgraduate or master's degree. The three Hogescholen are Hogeschool Rotterdam, Hogeschool Inholland and Codarts University for the Arts (Codarts hogeschool voor de kunsten), a vocational university that teaches music, dance and circus.

Unique to the city is the Shipping & Transport College, which offers master's, bachelor's and vocational diplomas at all levels.

== Culture ==
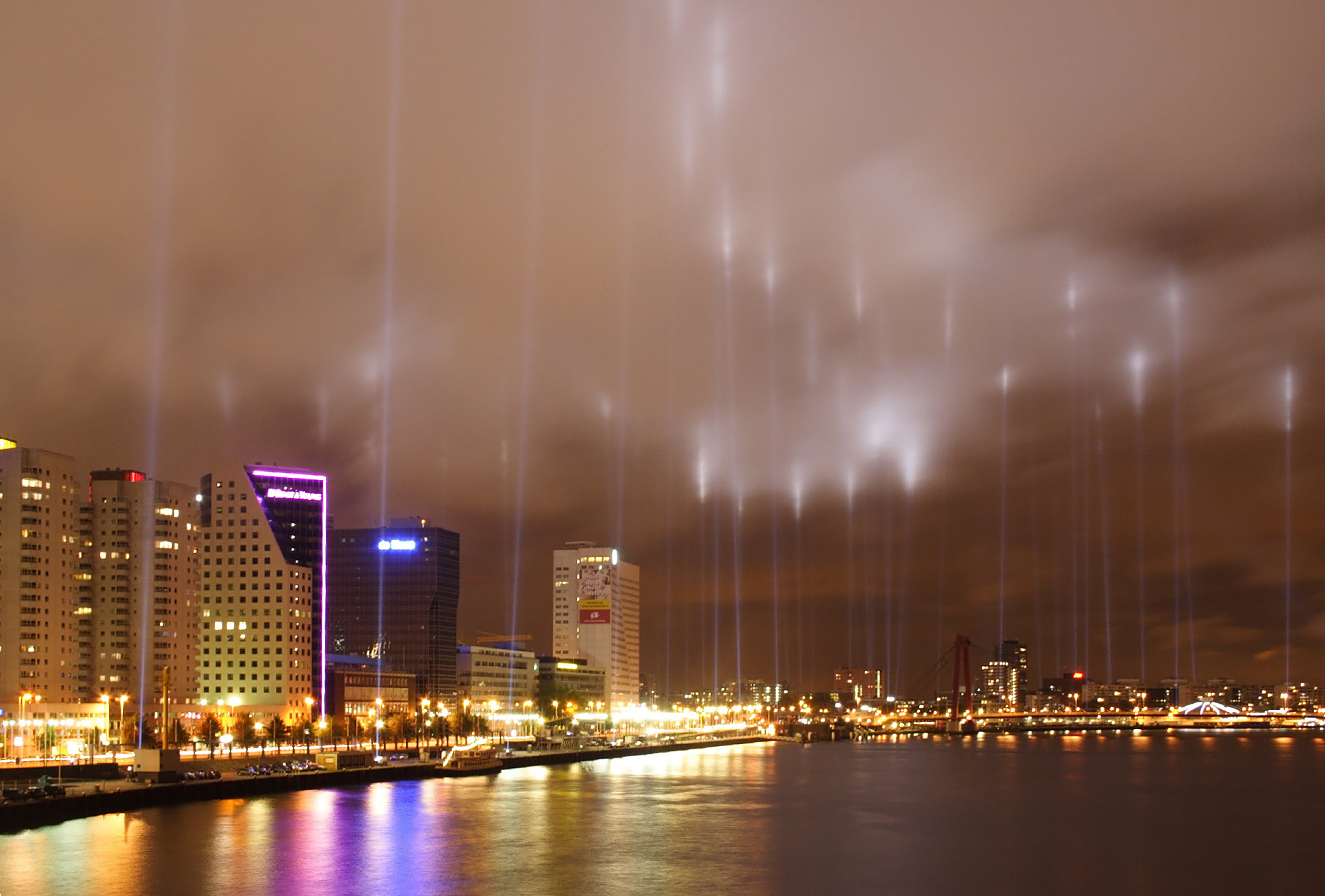
Rotterdam waterfront, with spotlights shining into the air to commemorate the Rotterdam Blitz

Once primarily a city of labour for its harbour and related industries, Rotterdam has developed into a city of culture, with various museums, cultural centres and activities, offering a stage for architecture, music, visual arts, poetry, cinema, theatre, and culture more generally, with a range of festivals and other events and a buzzing nightlife. The city has its own orchestra, the Rotterdam Philharmonic Orchestra, directed by Lahav Shani, which plays at the concert venue and convention center De Doelen. The Ahoy complex in the south of the city is used for pop concerts, exhibitions, tennis tournaments and other activities. There are also several theatres and cinemas, including LantarenVenster and Cinerama.

Alongside Porto, Rotterdam was European Capital of Culture in 2001.

=== Museums, libraries and archives ===
Rotterdam has various cultural institutions. Well-known museums are the Museum Boijmans Van Beuningen, Het Nieuwe Instituut, the Wereldmuseum Rotterdam, the Kunsthal, Kunstinstituut Melly and the Maritime Museum Rotterdam. The Historical Museum Rotterdam has changed into Museum Rotterdam, which aims to exhibit the development of Rotterdam as a contemporary transnational city, and not merely the city's past. Other museums include the Tax & Customs Museum, the Netherlands Marine Corps Museum, the Rotterdam Public Transport Museum and the Natural History Museum. The FENIX Museum of Migration opened in May 2025.

The first municipal library of Rotterdam was founded in 1604. The current Bibliotheek Rotterdam (public library) was established in 1869 and is currently the largest cultural organization in Rotterdam, with fifteen branches across the city.

The Rotterdam City Archives (Stadsarchief Rotterdam) was established in 1857. Here one can find administrative records and sources about the city's historical development. The archival holdings include, among others, general archives, notarial deeds, an audiovisual collection, and a library.

=== Popular music, film, festivals ===
Rotterdam has a long tradition of popular music, including the city's jazz scene before and after WWII. A major historical moment in the city's music history is the legendary Kralingen Pop Festival, which took place in Rotterdam in 1970 (featuring, among others, Pink Floyd, Jefferson Airplane, The Byrds, Canned Heat, It's a Beautiful Day, and Santana). The festival was also made into a film, Stamping Ground (dir. George Sluizer). Alternative (music) culture became prominently present in the city in these days. From the 1960s until the 2000s, Rotterdam had a thriving squatters' movement, which not only accommodated thousands of people but also created social centres and cultural venues. From this movement came clubs like Boogjes, Eksit, Nighttown, Vlerk and Waterfront. A major reference was Poortgebouw, which was squatted in 1980 and quickly legalised.

Rotterdam also became the home of Gabber, a type of hardcore electronic music popular in the mid-1990s, with hard beats and samples. Groups like Neophyte and Rotterdam Terror Corps (RTC) started in Rotterdam, playing at clubs like Parkzicht. In the years 2005–2011, the city struggled with keeping venues for pop music; many of them suffered severe financial problems. This resulted in the disappearance of the major music venues Nighttown and WATT and smaller stages such as Waterfront, Exit, and Heidegger. The city today has a few stages for pop music, like Rotown, Poortgebouw and Annabel. Additionally, the venue WORM focuses on experimental music, as well as various other cultural activities.

WORM also screens films and hosts a film lab, Filmwerkplaats. In fact, Rotterdam has an extensive film history, ranging from avant-garde classics, such as The Bridge (Ivens, 1928), to internationally acclaimed documentaries from the post-war era, such as Steady! (Van der Horst, 1952), and all kinds of fiction films. Of major importance within this context has also been the International Film Festival Rotterdam (IFFR), an annual event that lasts more than ten days (end of January, beginning of February), which has been organized since 1972. Besides the IFFR, several smaller film festivals take place in Rotterdam too, such as the Architecture Film Festival Rotterdam (AFFR).

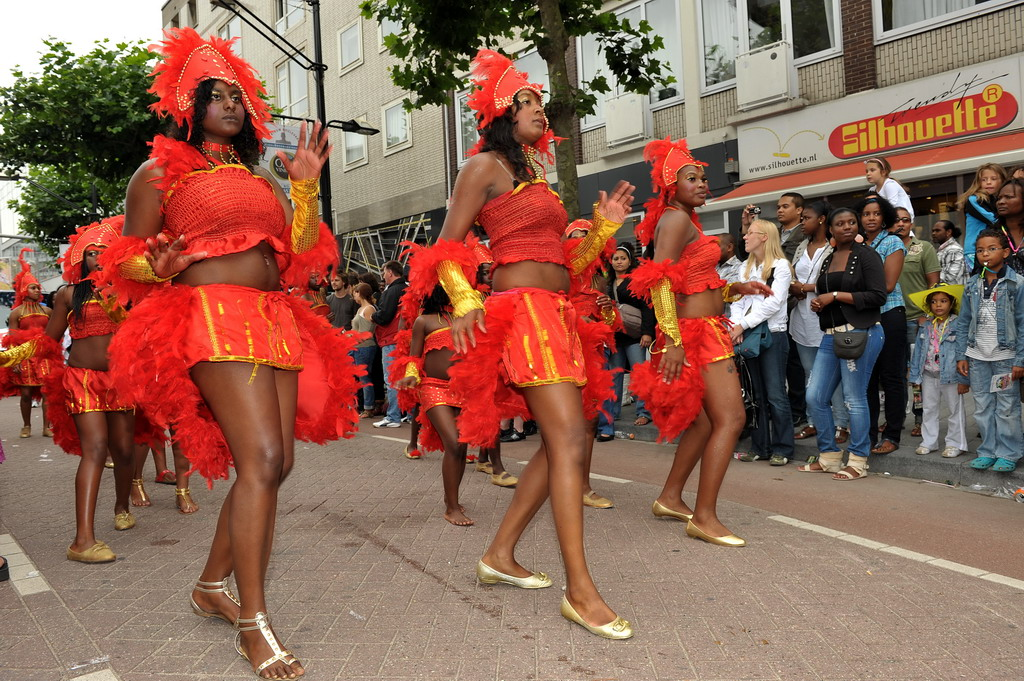
Summer Carnival in Rotterdam

Throughout the year, many different festivals take place in Rotterdam. There are the summer festivals celebrating the city's multicultural population and identity, such as the Caribbean-inspired "Summer Carnival", the Dance Parade, Rotterdam 666, and the Metropolis pop festival. There are also Poetry International (in June), the North Sea Jazz Festival (in July), the Valery Gergiev Festival (in September), and, also in September, the festival 'September in Rotterdam', the festival 'World of the Witte de With Quaret', and the World Port Days.

=== Eurovision Song Contest ===
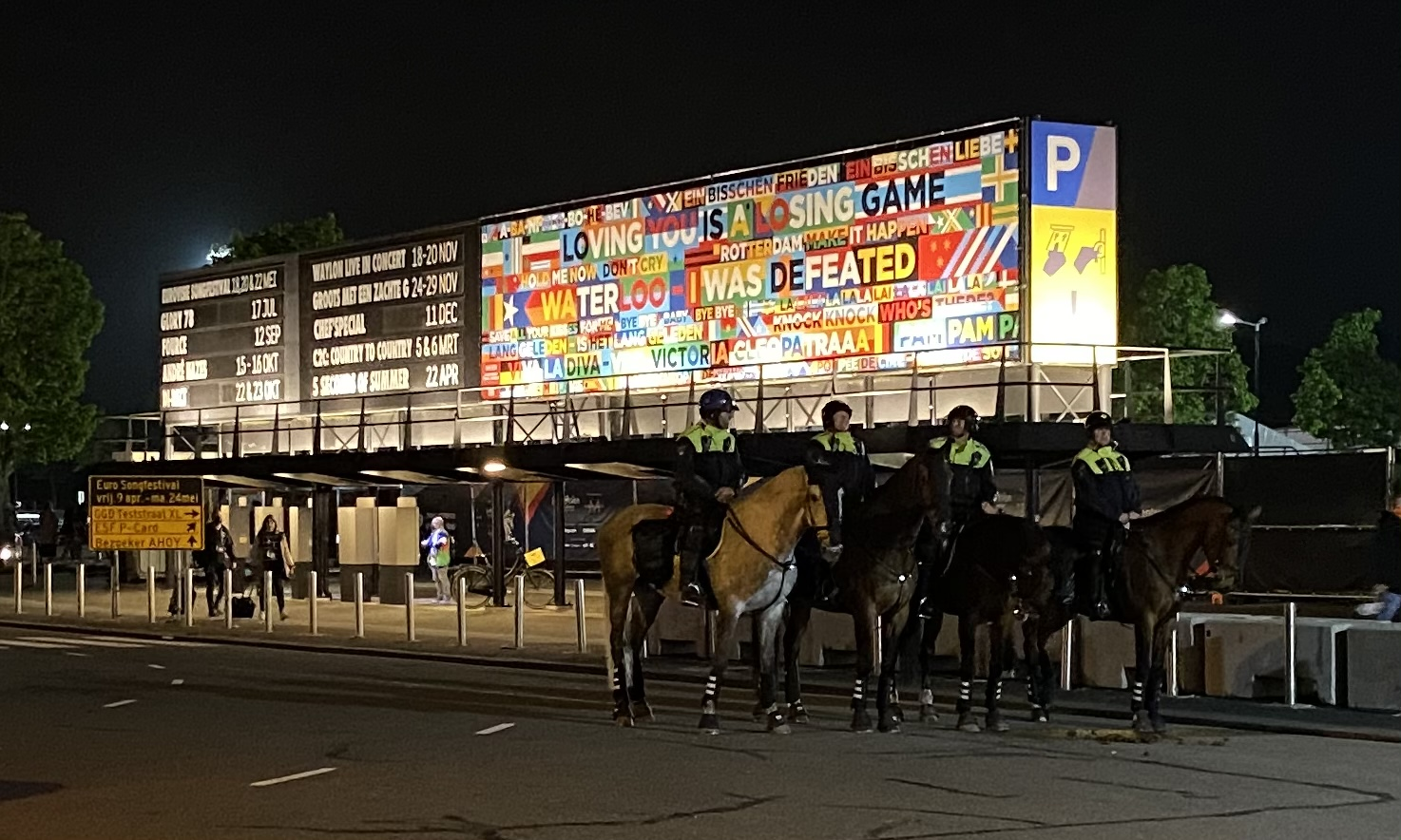
City decor for the Eurovision Song Contest 2021

On 30 August 2019, it was announced by the European Broadcasting Union and Dutch television broadcasters AVROTROS, NOS and NPO that Rotterdam would host the Eurovision Song Contest 2020, following the Dutch victory at the 2019 contest in Tel Aviv, Israel, with the song "Arcade", performed by Duncan Laurence. However, due to the COVID-19 pandemic in Europe, the 2020 contest was cancelled, and Rotterdam was later retained as host of the 2021 contest. The contest took place at Rotterdam Ahoy, with the semi-finals taking place on 18 and 20 May 2021 and the final taking place on 22 May 2021. This was the first time that Rotterdam hosted the contest and the first time that the Netherlands hosted the contest since 1980, when it was held in The Hague.

=== Rivalry ===
There is a healthy competition with Amsterdam, which is often viewed as the cultural capital of the Netherlands. This rivalry is most common amongst the city's football supporters, Feyenoord (Rotterdam) and Ajax (Amsterdam), and it is so severe that football games are only played with the home crowd present due to out-of-control riots in the past. There is a saying: "Amsterdam to party, Den Haag (The Hague) to live, Rotterdam to work". Another one, more popular with Rotterdammers, is "Money is earned in Rotterdam, distributed in The Hague and spent in Amsterdam". Another saying that reflects both the rivalry between Rotterdam and Amsterdam is "Amsterdam has it, Rotterdam doesn't need it". Bright magazine editor Erwin van der Zande notes that this phrase is on T-shirts in Rotterdam.

== Architecture ==
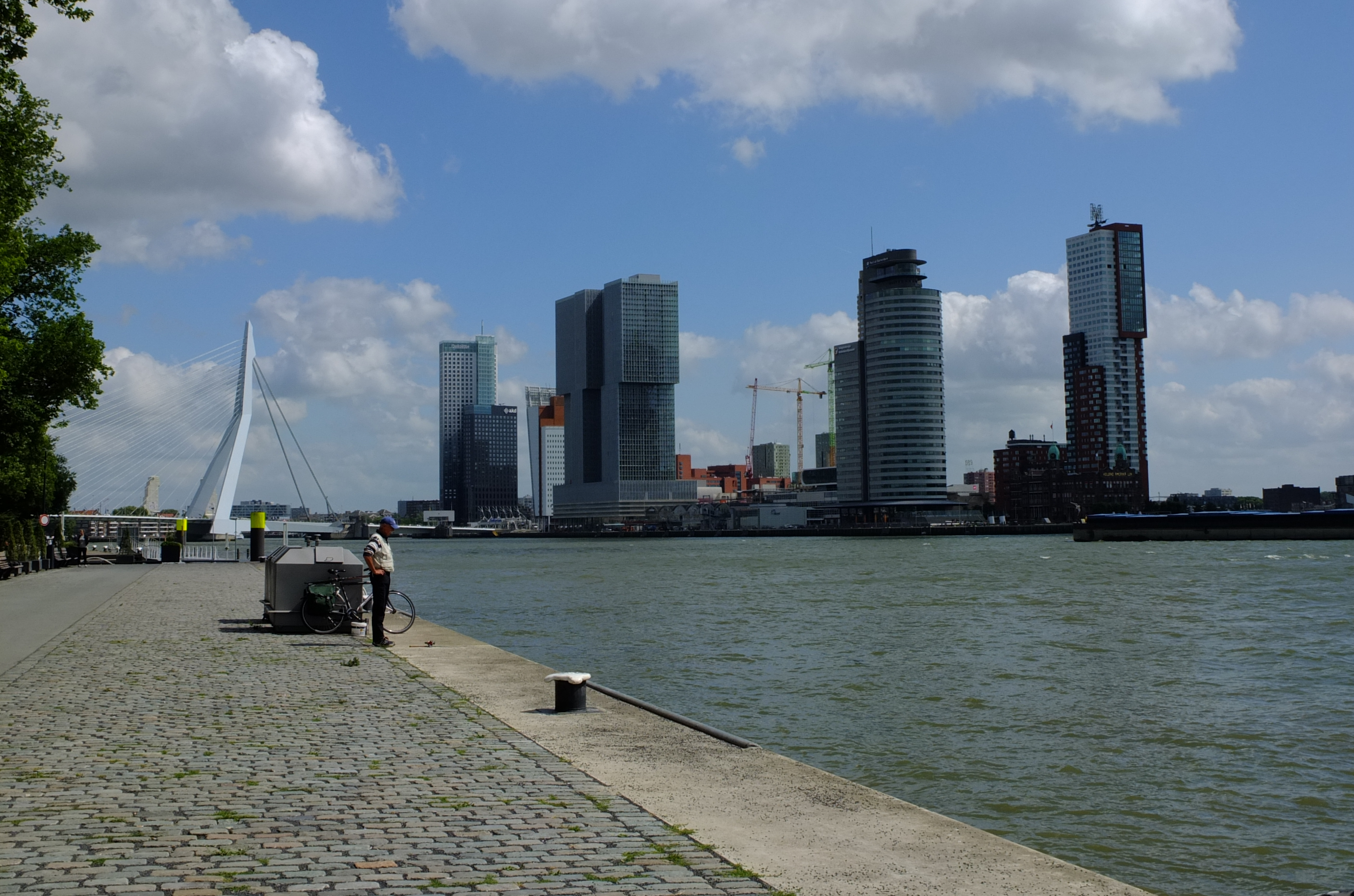
The Wilhelmina pier at the Kop van Zuid in the distance, on the left the Erasmus Bridge can be seen

Rotterdam has become world famous because of its modern and groundbreaking architecture. Throughout the years the city has been nicknamed Manhattan at the Meuse and The architectural capital of the Netherlands both for its skyline and because it is home to internationally leading architectural firms involved in the design of famous buildings and bridges in other big cities. Examples include OMA (Rem Koolhaas), MVRDV, Neutelings & Riedijk and Erick van Egeraat. It has the reputation of being a platform for architectural development and education through the NAi (Netherlands Architecture Institute), which is open to the public and has a variety of exhibitions on architecture and urban planning issues, and previously the Berlage Institute, a postgraduate laboratory of architecture. The city has 38 skyscrapers and 352 high-rises and has many skyscrapers planned or under construction. The top 5 highest buildings in the Netherlands consist entirely of buildings in Rotterdam. It is home to the two tallest buildings in the Netherlands, the Maastoren with a height of 165 meters and the Zalmhaven Tower (completed in 2021) with a height of 215 meters.

=== History ===
In 1898, the 45 m (148 ft) high-rise office building the White House (in Dutch Witte Huis) was completed, at that time the tallest office building in Europe. In the first decades of the 20th century, some influential architecture in the modern style was built in Rotterdam. Notable are the Van Nelle fabriek (1929) a monument of modern factory design by Brinkman and Van der Vlugt, the Jugendstil clubhouse of the Royal Maas Yacht Club designed by Hooijkaas jr. en Brinkman (1909), and Feyenoord's football stadium De Kuip (1936), also by Brinkman and Van der Vlugt. The architect J. J. P. Oud was a famous Rotterdammer in those days. The Van Nelle Factory obtained the status of UNESCO World Heritage Site in 2014. During the early stages of World War II, the centre of Rotterdam was bombed by the German Luftwaffe, destroying many of the older buildings in the centre of the city. After an initial crisis of reconstruction, the centre of Rotterdam has become the site of the ambitious new architecture.

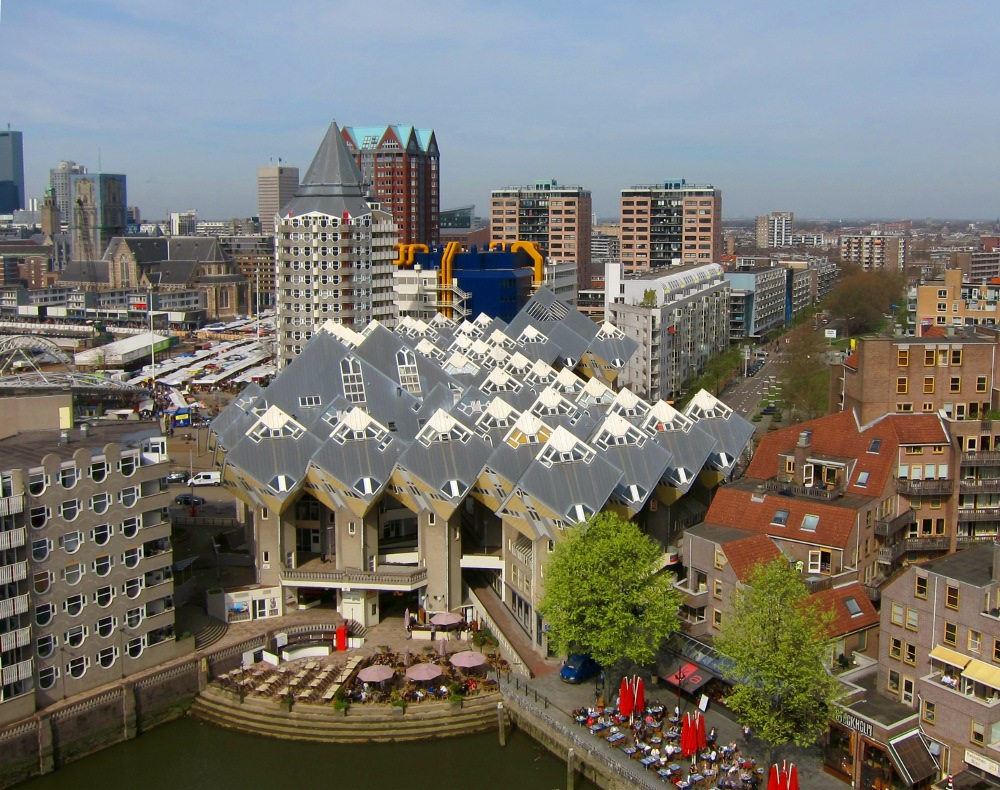
The Cube Houses, popularly known as the Blaak-forest in 2014

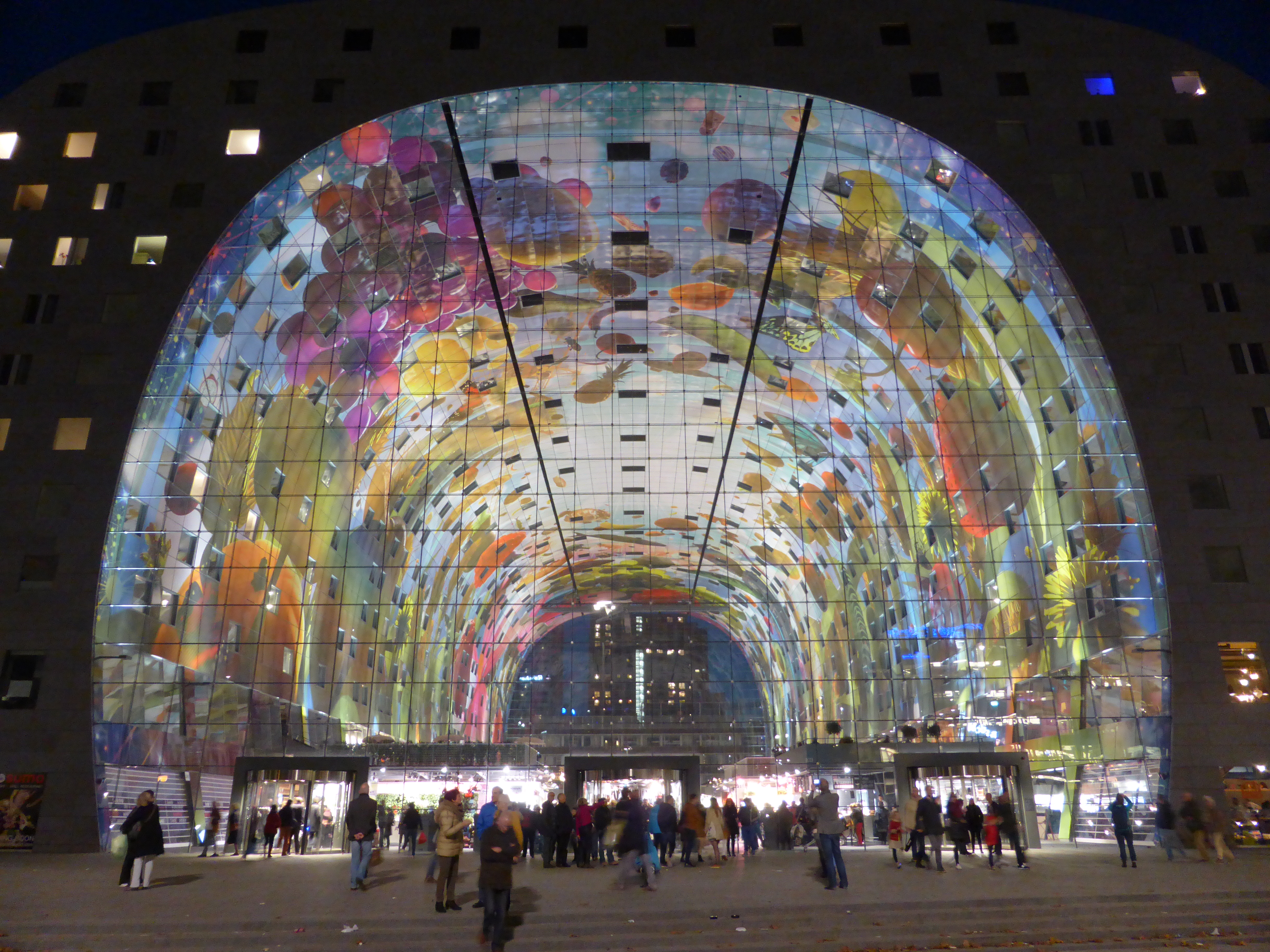
The Markthal at night as seen from the Binnenrotte

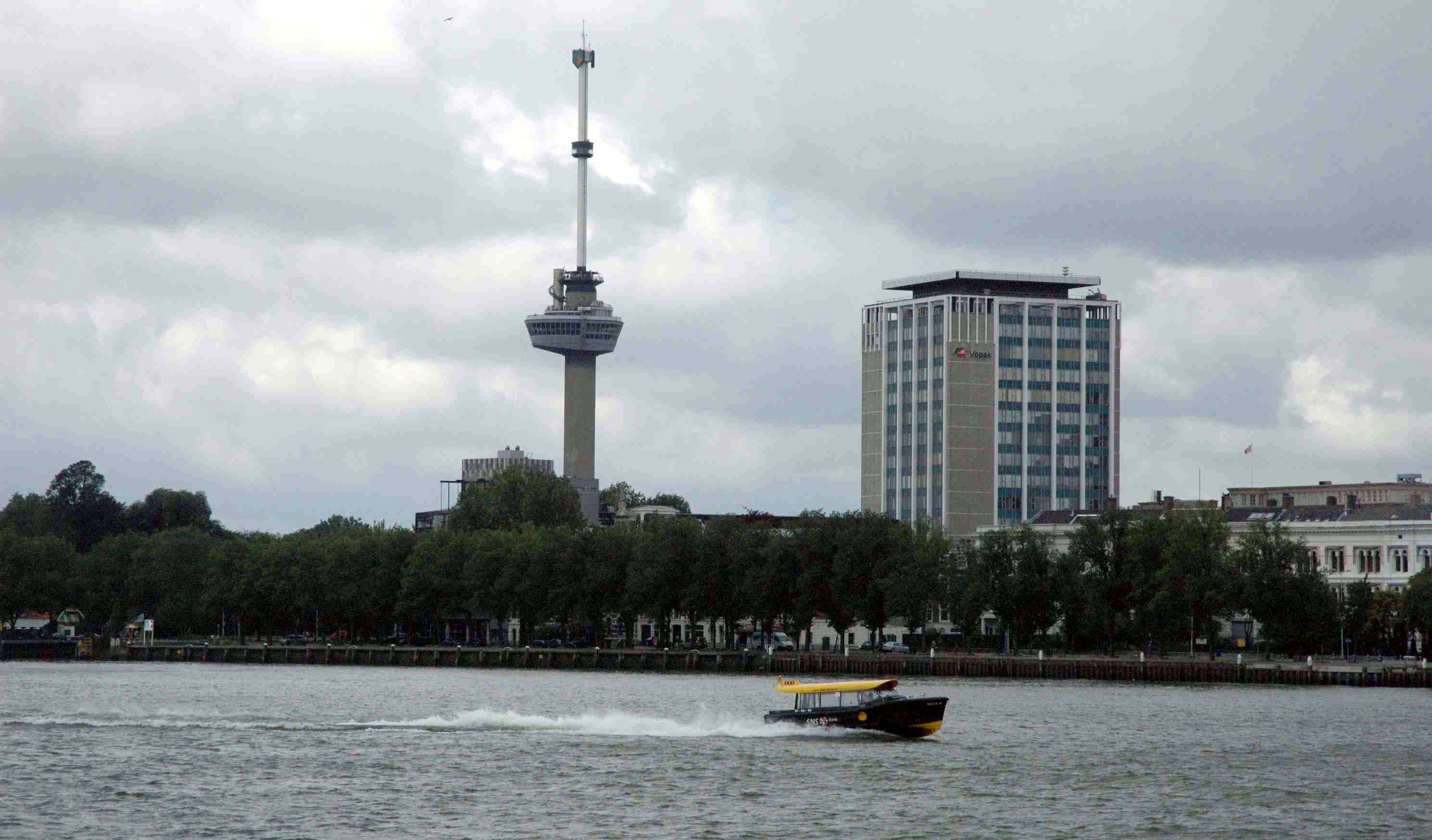
The Euromast in 2005

Rotterdam is also famous for its Lijnbaan 1952 by architects Broek en Bakema, Peperklip by architect Carel Weeber, and the Kubuswoningen or cube houses designed by architect Piet Blom in 1984.

The newest landmark in Rotterdam is the Markthal, designed by architect firm MVRDV. In addition to that, there are many internationally well-known architects based in Rotterdam, like O.M.A (Rem Koolhaas), Neutelings & Riedijk and Erick van Egeraat, to name a few. Two architectural landmarks are located in the Lloydkwartier: the STC college building and the Schiecentrale 4b. The construction of the Depot of the Museum Boijmans Van Beuningen was started in 2003 and was officially opened by King Willem-Alexander on 5 November 2021. It is the world's first fully accessible art depot.

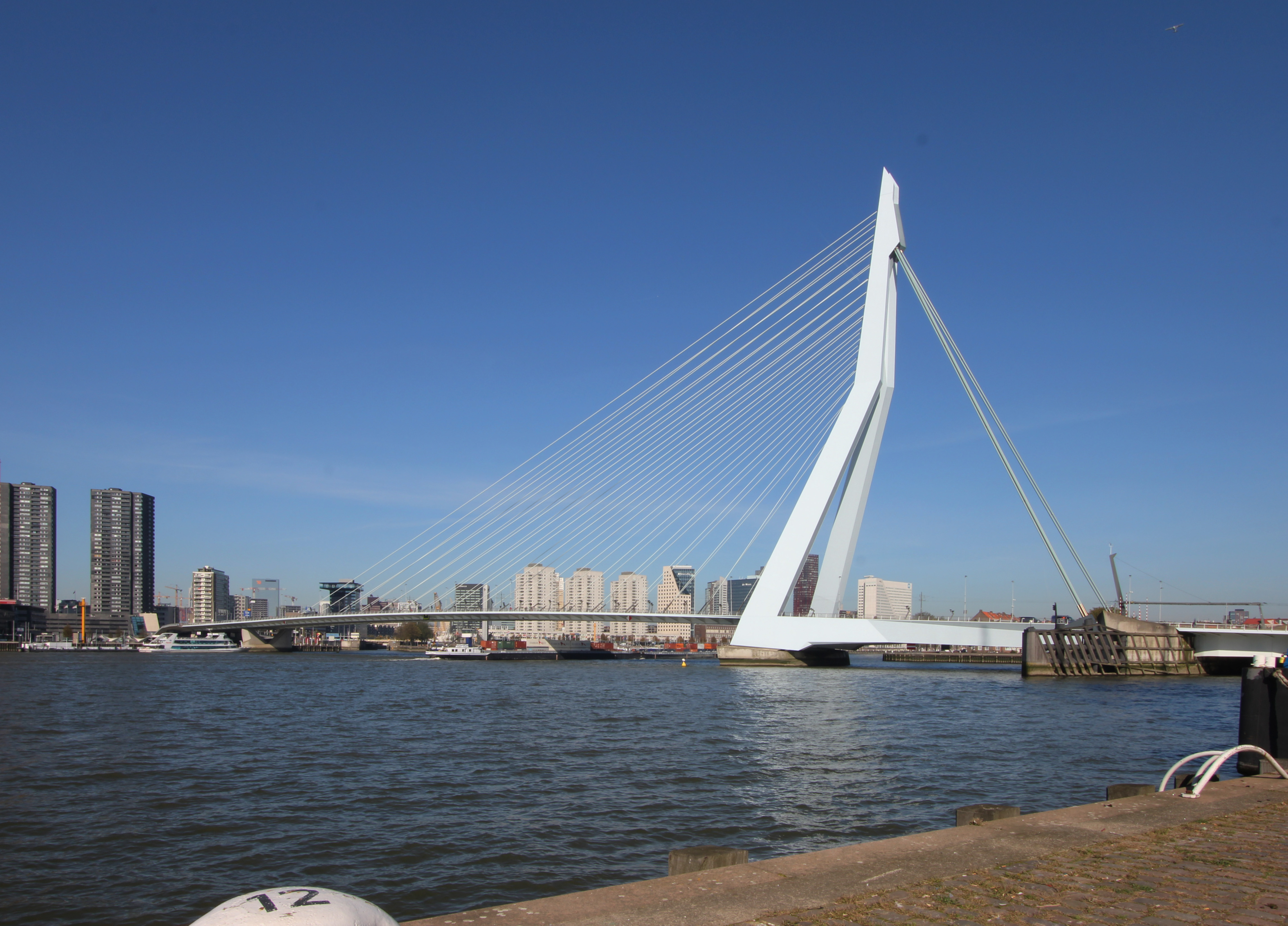
Erasmus Bridge in 2011

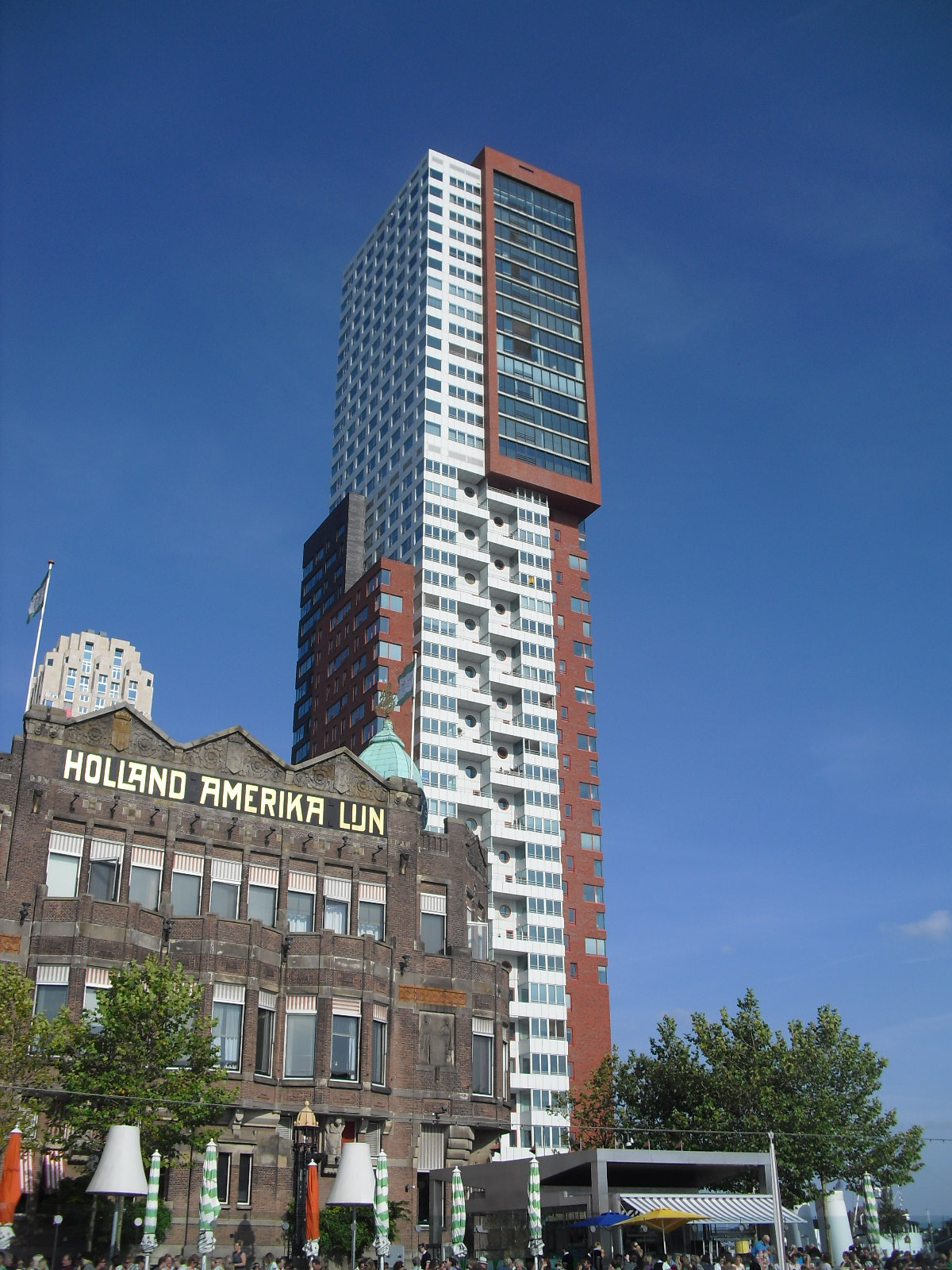
The former headquarters of the Holland America Line next to modern residential architecture in 2010

Rotterdam also houses several of the tallest structures in the Netherlands.

- The Erasmusbrug (1996) is a 790-meter (2,600 ft) cable-stayed bridge linking the north and south of Rotterdam. It is held up by a 138 m (453 ft) tall pylon with a characteristic bend, earning the bridge its nickname 'De Zwaan' ('the Swan').
- Rotterdam has the tallest residential building in the Netherlands: the De Zalmhaven Tower (215 m (705.4 ft)).
- Rotterdam is also home to the tallest office building in the Netherlands, the 'Maastoren' (164.75 m or 540.5 ft), which houses Deloitte. This office tower surpassed the 'Delftse Poort' (160 m or 520 ft), which houses the Nationale-Nederlanden insurance company, part of ING Group, as the tallest office tower in 2009.
- The skyline of Rotterdam also houses the 185 m (607 ft) tall Euromast, which is a major tourist attraction. It was built in 1960, initially reaching a height of 101 m (331 ft); in 1970, the Euromast was extended by 85 m (279 ft).

Rotterdam has a reputation for being a platform for architectural development and education through the Berlage Institute, a postgraduate laboratory of architecture, and the NAi (Netherlands Architecture Institute), which is open to the public and has a variety of exhibitions on architecture and urban planning issues.

Over 30 new highrise projects are being developed. A Guardian journalist wrote in 2013 that "All this is the consequence of the city suffering a bombardment of two things: bombs and architects."

=== Parks ===
Within Rotterdam's urban structure, parks and greenery play an important role. A number of well-known parks in Rotterdam are:

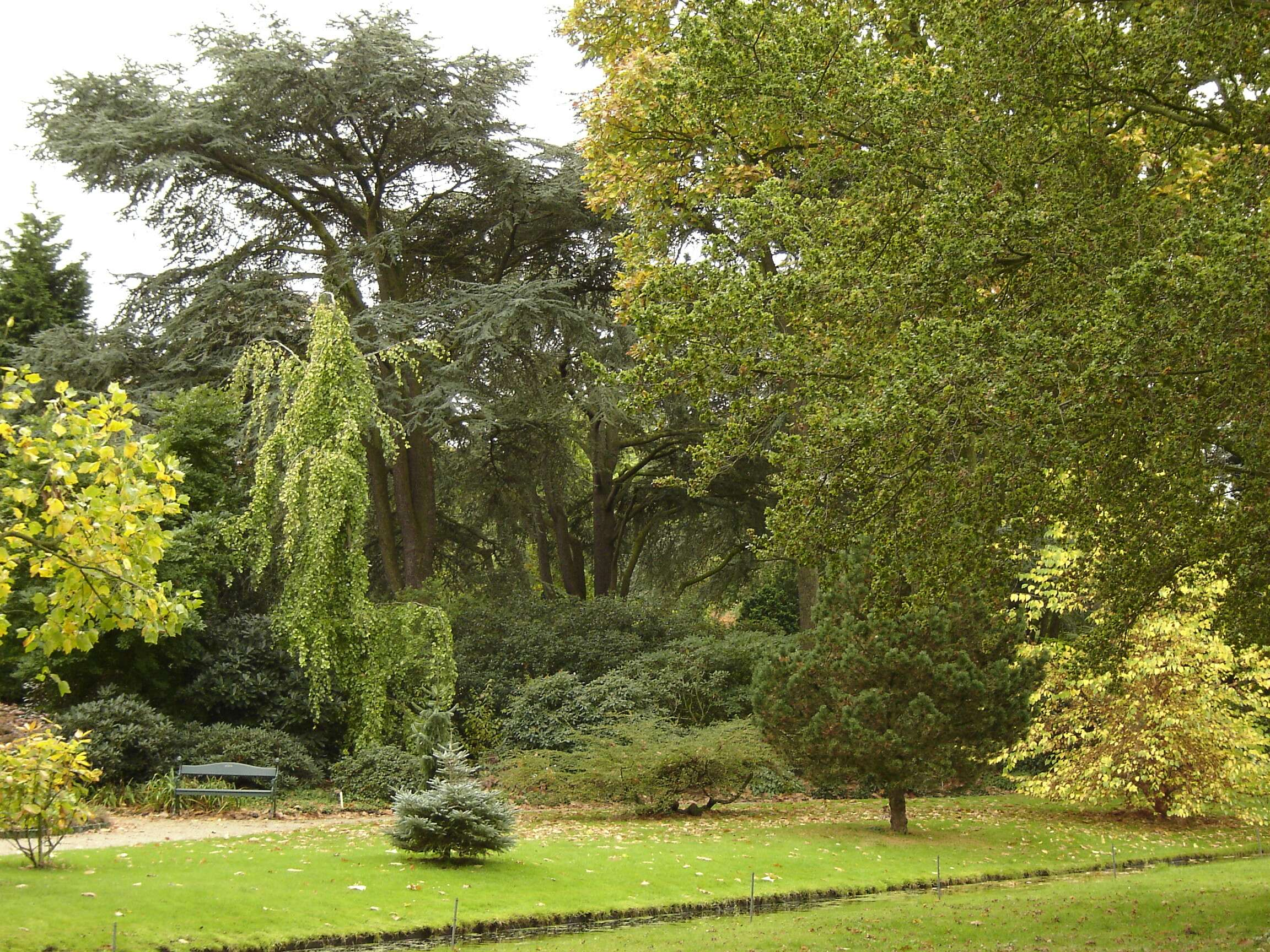
Arboretum Trompenburg

- Het Park (Het Park bij de Euromast) is a 70-acre park on the Maas, south of the Westzeedijk, at the Euromast. The eastern half of the park was constructed between 1852 and 1863 to a design by the firm Jan David Zocher. The western part was added in 1866 with some modifications. The first Floriade in 1960 was held in Het Park, with the Euromast observation tower being erected to mark the event. National Heritage site since 2011. Originally, the park continued across the Westzeedijk, where the Medical Faculty was built in the 1960s (now Erasmus MC). See also: Museumpark.
- Museumpark, close to Het Park, was originally designed in 1927 by architect W.G. Witteveen, who also designed Museum Boijmans Van Beuningen. Today, several museums have clustered around the park.
- Diergaarde Blijdorp, which is situated on the northwest side of Rotterdam, complete with a walkthrough sea aquarium called the Oceanium.
- Arboretum Trompenburg in Kralingen. The park dates back to 1820, but it was only after it was opened to the public in 1958 that the park, which was managed by the (Van Hoey) Smith family for generations, gained wider attention. The park, approximately 20 acres in size, contains approximately 4,000 different types of trees, shrubs and perennials, including the national plant collections of conifers, Quercus, Fagus, Rhododendron, Ligustrum, Rodgersia and Hosta, among others.
- Park Schoonoord (3 acres) is located in the Scheepvaartkwartier and was designed in its current form in 1860 by Jan David Zocher.
- The Kralingse Bos (500 acres) with the Kralingse Plas (250 acres) is located in the Kralingen district and has been based on a design by Marinus Jan Granpré Molière since 1928. In 1953 the Kralingse Bos officially opened.
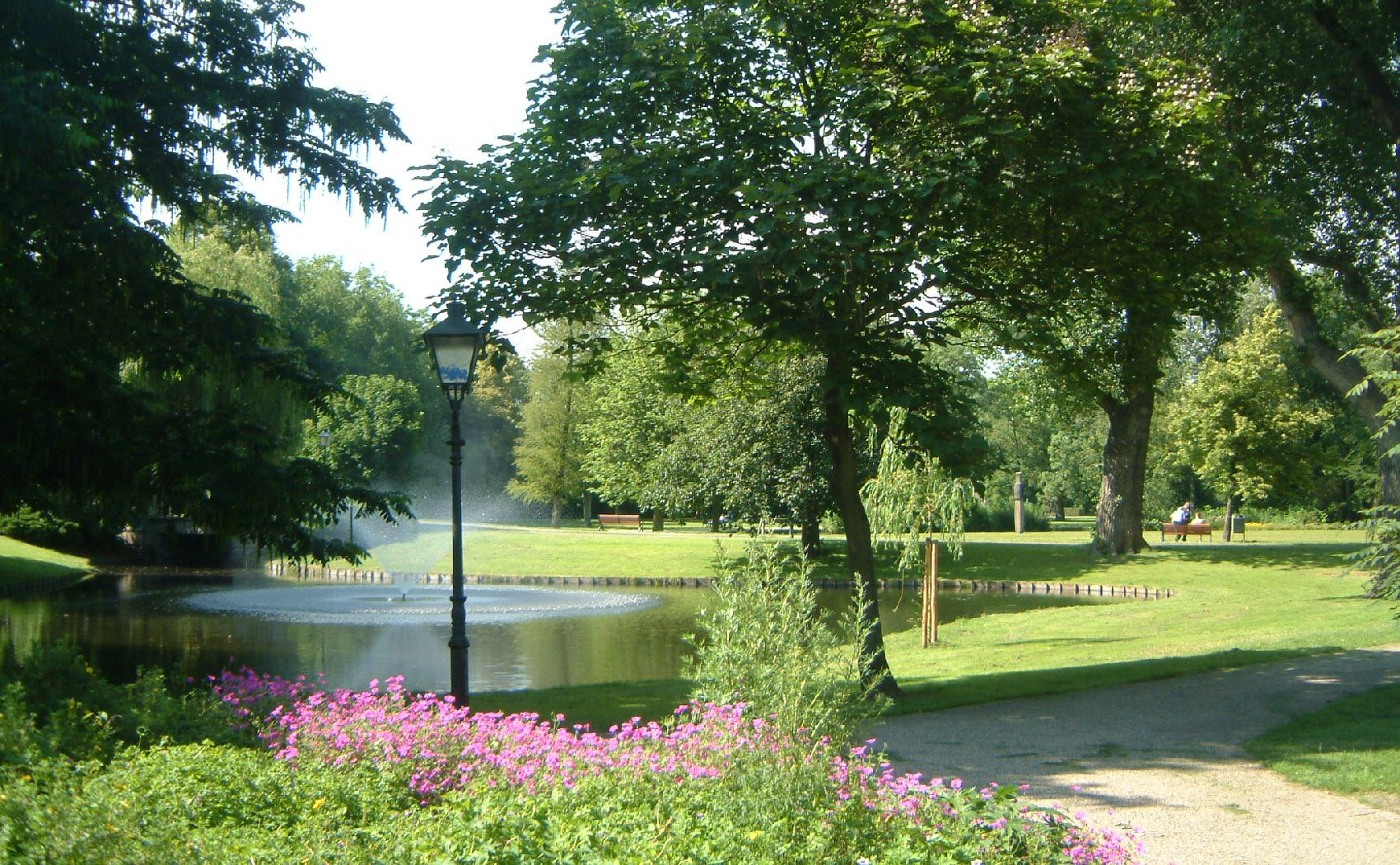
  Park Rozenburg
- The Vroesenpark in the district Rotterdam-Noord was laid out from 1929 to a plan by city architect W.G. Witteveen.
- The Zuiderpark (780 acres) is located in the district of Charlois. The park was laid out as a utility park from 1952 and not as an ornamental park.
- Park Rozenburg is a 7.41 acres (3.00 ha) park in the neighbourhood of Kralingen. The park is a protected municipal monument (Dutch: Gemeentelijk monument).

==== Green activities ====
Since 28 May 1994, Rotterdam has had the phenomenon Opzoomeren. 15% of Rotterdam residents (about 100,000 residents) say they participate in this phenomenon. At the end of 2020, the city has a record number of 2,503 Opzoomer streets, which is mainly reflected in the construction of facade gardens.

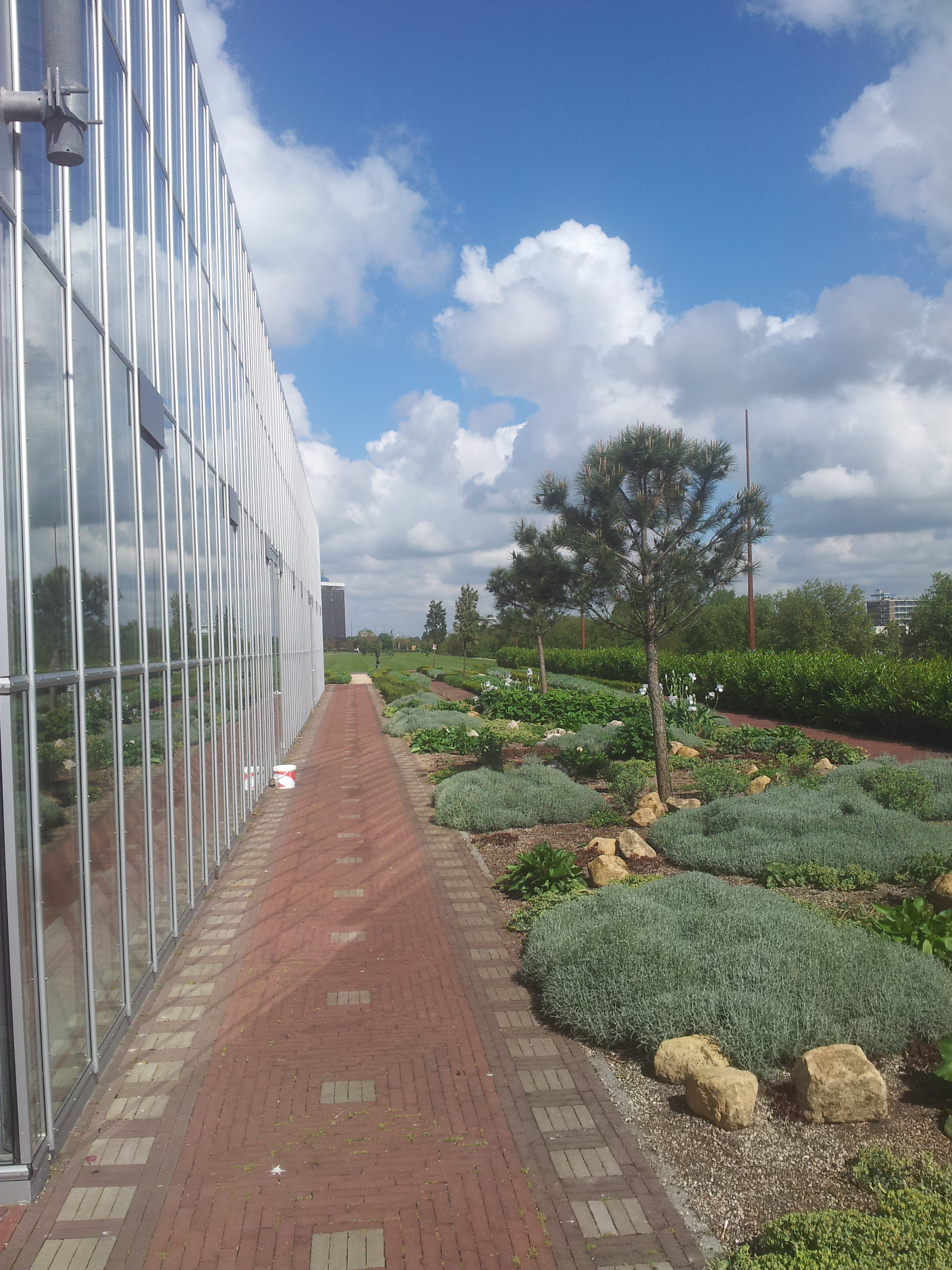
Dakpark Rotterdam

The municipality of Rotterdam is encouraging the construction of green roofs. There is an attractive subsidy for roof owners, and the city has now provided a number of municipal buildings with a green roof. As of 1 January 2020, the water storage capacity requirement has been increased to 30 liters of water storage capacity per square metre. This reduces the burden on the sewer system during heavy rainfall and reduces the risk of flooding on the street.

- The city's largest green roof is located on top of the Groothandelsgebouw next to Central Station.
- The Dakakker is the largest roof farm in Europe on top of the Schieblok.
- The Dakpark is an elongated, narrow park in the district Bospolder-Tussendijken in Rotterdam-West. It has been built at a height of about nine meters, is about 85 meters wide and extends for about a kilometer from Hudson Square to near Marconi Square.
- The municipality of Rotterdam will provide the flat roof of the conference and concert building De Doelen with greenery and water storage. The design for the roof was made by Kraijvanger Architects.

== Sports ==
Rotterdam calls itself Sportstad (City of Sports). The city annually organises several world-renowned sporting events. Some examples are the Rotterdam Marathon, the World Port Tournament, and the Rotterdam World Tennis Tournament. Rotterdam has also hosted a race of the Red Bull Air Race World Championship and the car racing event Monaco aan de Maas (Monaco at the Meuse).

The city is also the home of many sports clubs and some historic and iconic athletes.

=== Football ===
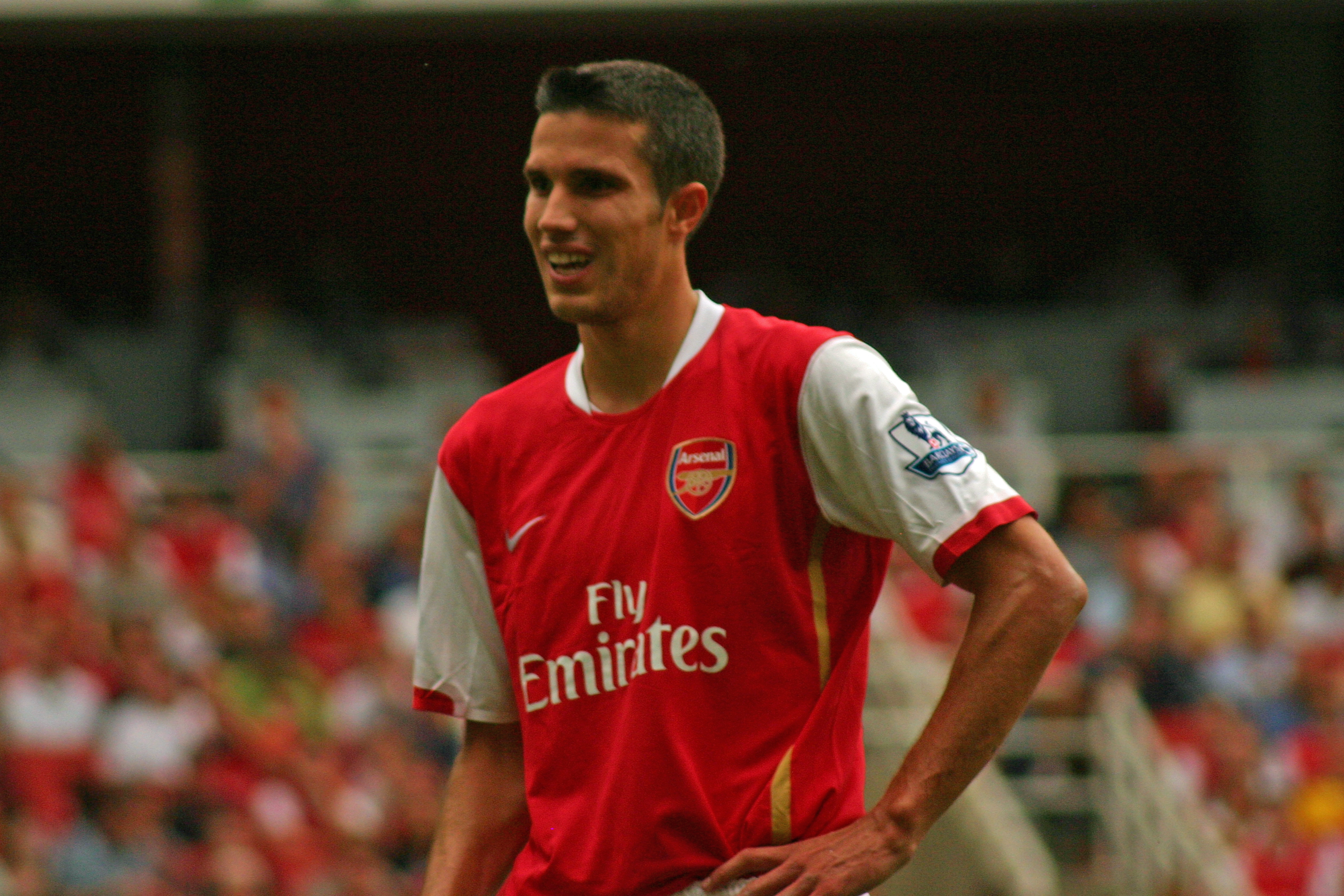
Robin van Persie began his career with Excelsior and broke through in Feyenoord.

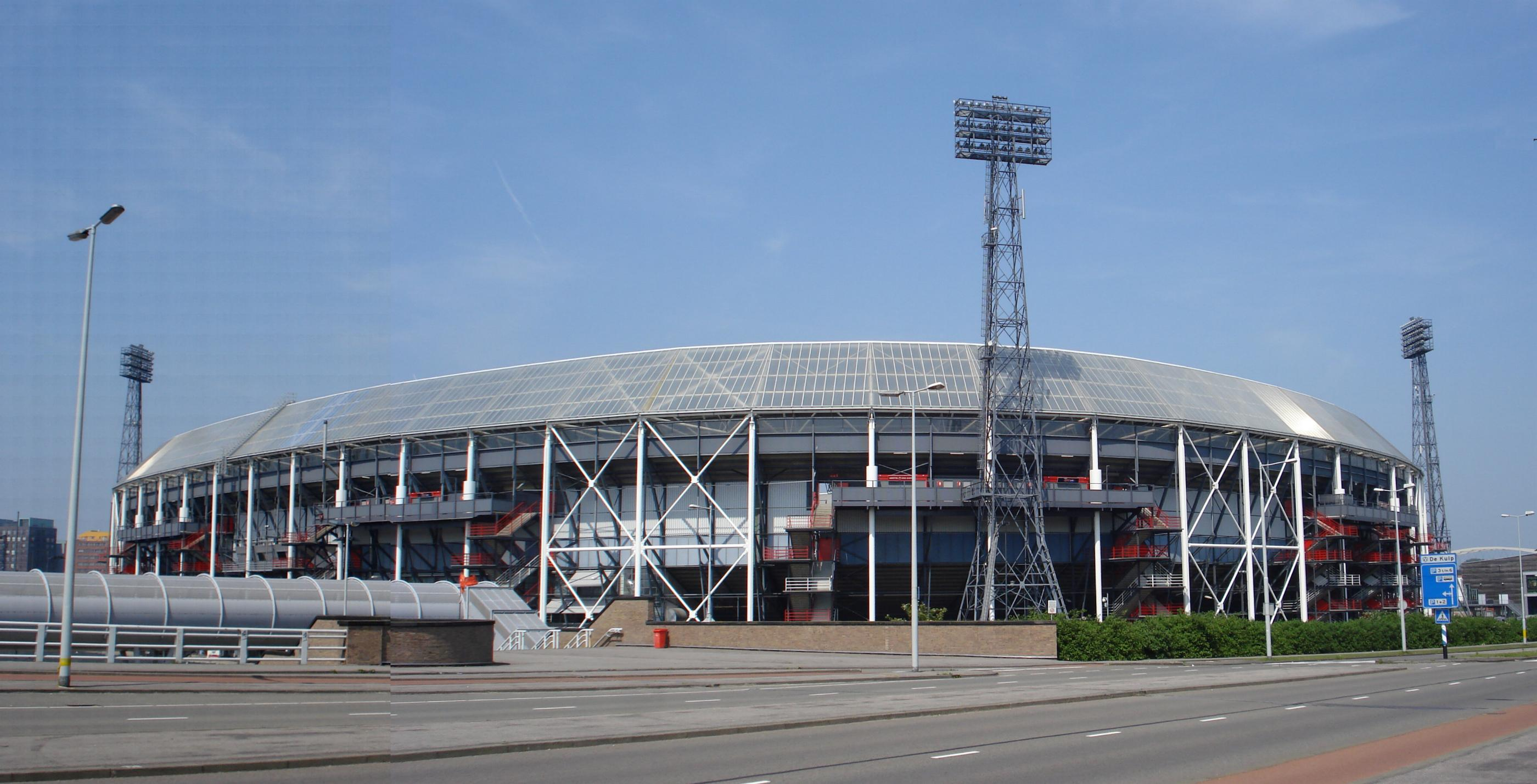
De Kuip, Feyenoord home stadium

Rotterdam is the home of three professional football clubs, being first-tier clubs Feyenoord, Sparta, and Excelsior.

Feyenoord, founded in 1908 and the dominant of the three professional clubs, has won sixteen national titles since the introduction of professional football in the Netherlands. It won the UEFA Champions League as the first Dutch club in 1970 and won the World Cup for club teams in the same year. In 1974, they were the first Dutch club to win the UEFA Cup, and in 2002, Feyenoord won the UEFA Cup again. In 2008, the year of their 100-year anniversary, Feyenoord won the KNVB Cup.

Seating 51,480, its 1937 stadium, called Stadion Feijenoord but popularly known as De Kuip ('the Tub'), is the second-largest in the country, after the Amsterdam Arena. De Kuip, located in the southeast of the city, has hosted many international football games, including the final of Euro 2000, and has been awarded a FIFA 5-star ranking. There were concrete plans to build a new stadium with a capacity of at least 63,000 seats; these fell through after supporter backlash and lack of funds.

Sparta, founded in 1888 and situated in the northwest of Rotterdam, won the national title six times; Excelsior (founded 1902), in the northeast, has never won any.

Rotterdam also has three fourth tier clubs, SC Feijenoord (Feyenoord Amateurs), PVV DOTO and TOGR. Rotterdam is and has been the home to many great football players and coaches, among whom:

- Bert van Marwijk
- Coen Moulijn
- Howard D Carter
- Dirk Kuyt
- Ernst Happel
- Faas Wilkes
- Giovanni van Bronckhorst
- Georginio Wijnaldum
- Henrik Larsson
- Danny Blind
- John de Wolf
- Jon Dahl Tomasson
- Leo Beenhakker
- Louis van Gaal
- Ove Kindvall
- Kevin Strootman
- Memphis Depay
- Pierre van Hooijdonk
- Pim Doesburg
- Puck van Heel
- Rinus Israël
- Robin van Persie
- Ronald Koeman
- Roy Makaay
- Ruud Gullit
- Sonny Silooy
- Willem van Hanegem
- Wim Jansen
- Winston Bogarde
- Włodzimierz Smolarek
- Julio Ricardo Cruz

=== Marathon ===
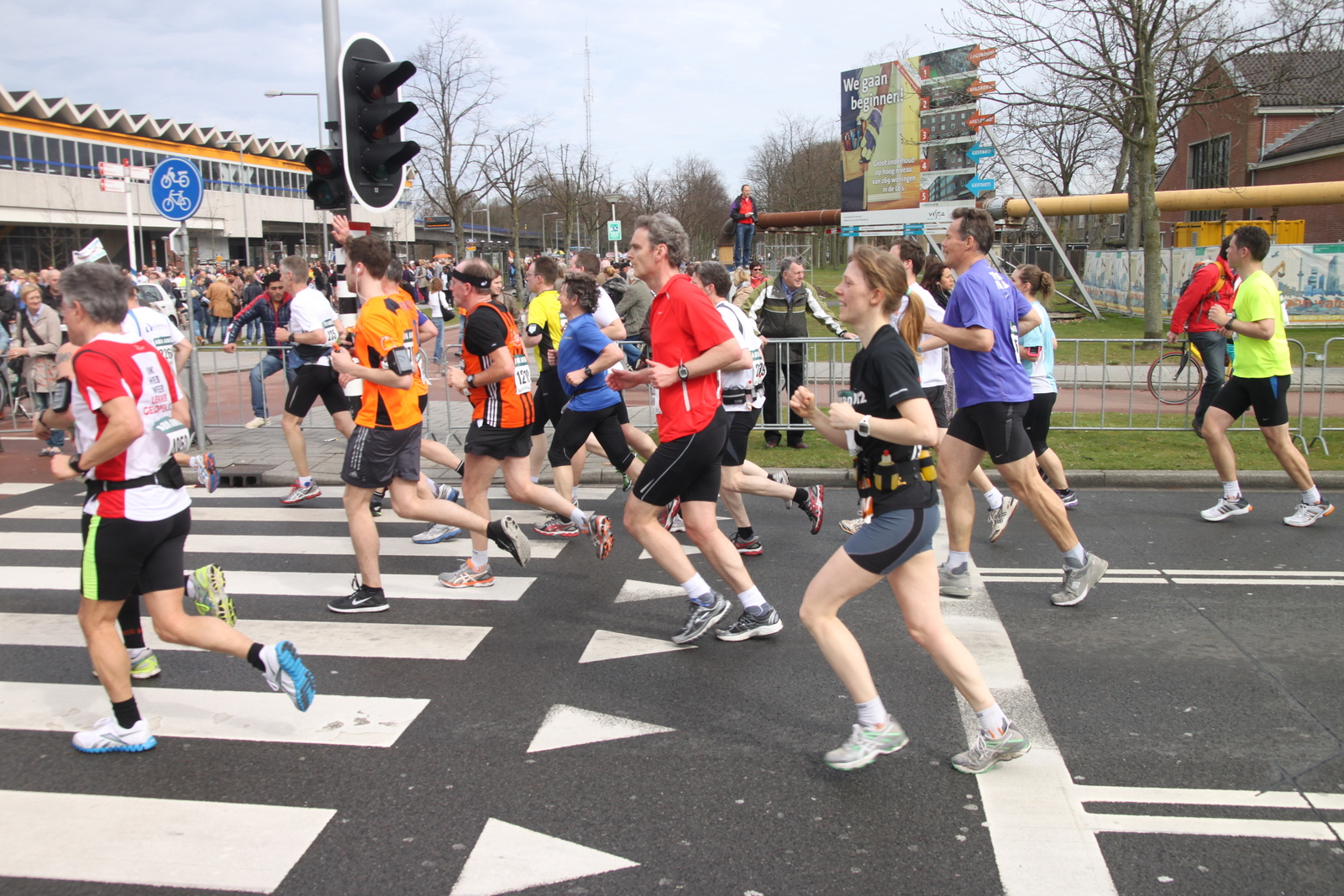
Runners during the marathon in Rotterdam

Rotterdam has its own annual international marathon, which offers one of the fastest courses in the world. From 1985 until 1998, the world record was set in Rotterdam, first by Carlos Lopes and later in 1988 by Belayneh Densamo.

In 1998, the world record for women was set by Tegla Loroupe, in a time of 2:20.47. Loroupe won the Rotterdam Marathon three consecutive times, from 1997 to 1999.

The track record for men is held by Bashir Abdi, who ran a time of 2:03.36 in 2021. The female record was set in 2012 when Tiki Gelana finished the race in 2:18.58. Gelana went on to become the 2012 Olympic champion in London a few months later.

The marathon starts and ends on the Coolsingel in the heart of Rotterdam. It attracts a total of 900,000 visitors.

=== Tennis ===
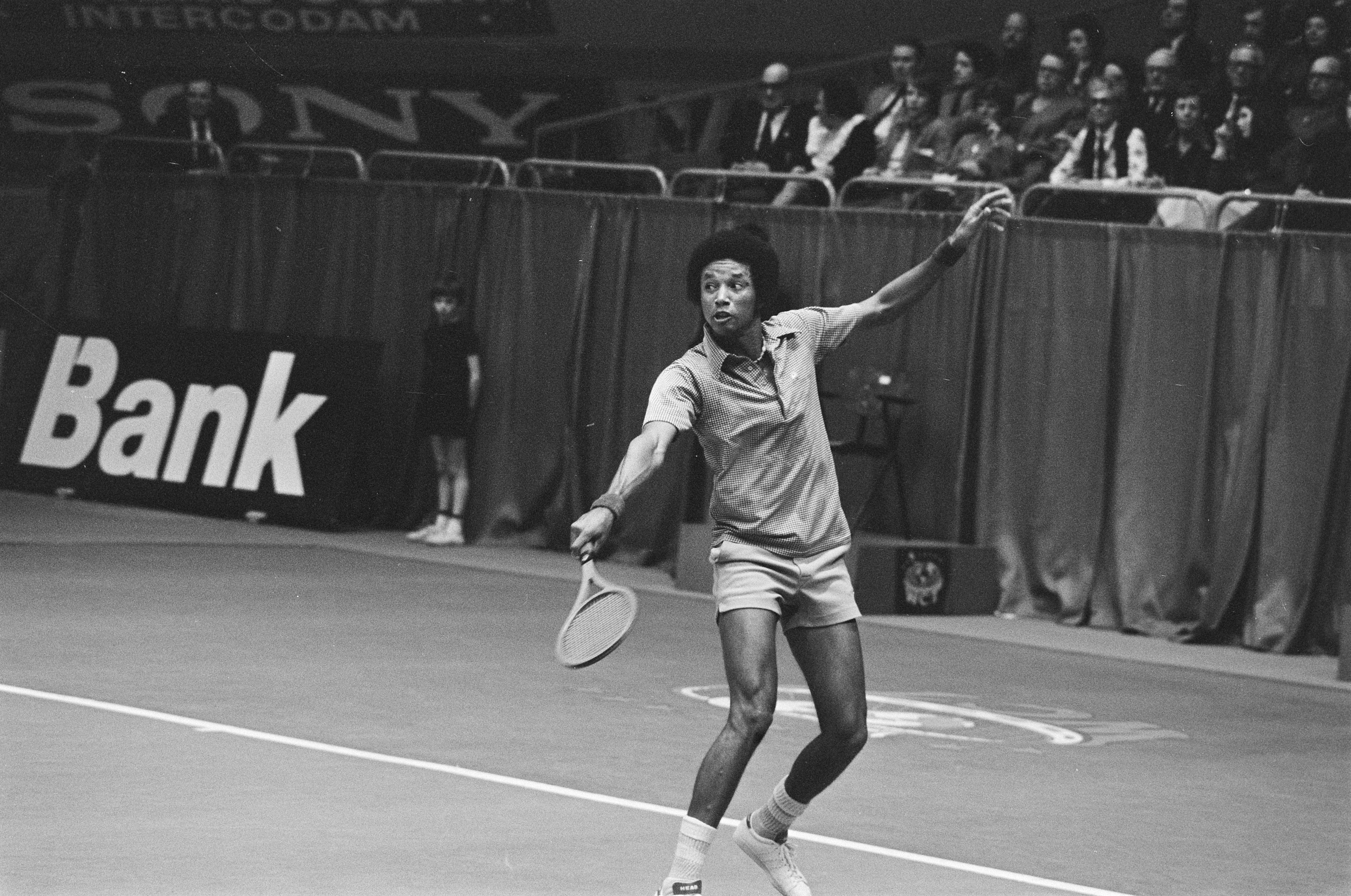
Arthur Ashe at the 1975 ABN World Tennis Tournament

Since 1972, Rotterdam has hosted the indoor hard court ABN AMRO World Tennis Tournament (part of the ATP Tour) ever since the event was first organised in 1972, when it was won by Arthur Ashe. Ashe went on to win the tournament two more times, making him the singles title record holder.

Former Wimbledon winner Richard Krajicek became the tournament director after his retirement in 2000. The latest edition of the tournament attracted a total of 116,354 visitors.

=== Tour de France ===
In November 2008 Rotterdam was chosen as the host of the Grand Départ of the 2010 Tour de France. Rotterdam won the selection over the Dutch city of Utrecht. Germany's Düsseldorf had previously also expressed interest in hosting. The Amaury Sport Organisation (ASO), the organizer of the Tour de France, said in a statement on its website that it chose Rotterdam because, in addition to it being another big city, like London, to showcase the use of bikes for urban transportation, it provided a location well-positioned considering the rest of the route envisioned for the 2010 event. The start in Rotterdam was the fifth to take place in the Netherlands. The prologue was a 7 km (4.35 mi) individual time trial crossing the centre of the city. The first regular stage left the Erasmusbrug and went south, towards Brussels.

The second stage of the 2015 edition took the riders through Rotterdam on their way to Neeltje Jans in Zeeland.

The 2024 edition of the Tour de France Femmes began in Rotterdam, with three stages in the Netherlands.

=== Rowing ===
Members of the student rowing club Skadi were part of the 'Holland Acht', winning a gold medal at the Olympics in 1996. Since the opening in April 2013, Rotterdam hosts the rowing venue Willem-Alexander Baan that hosted the 2016 World Rowing Championships for Seniors, U23 and Juniors.

=== Field hockey ===
In field hockey, Rotterdam has the largest hockey club in the Netherlands, HC Rotterdam, with its own stadium in the north of the city and nearly 2,400 members. The first men's and women's teams both play on the highest level in the Dutch Hoofdklasse.

=== Baseball ===
Rotterdam is home to the most successful European baseball team, Neptunus Rotterdam, winning the most European Cups.

=== Boxing ===
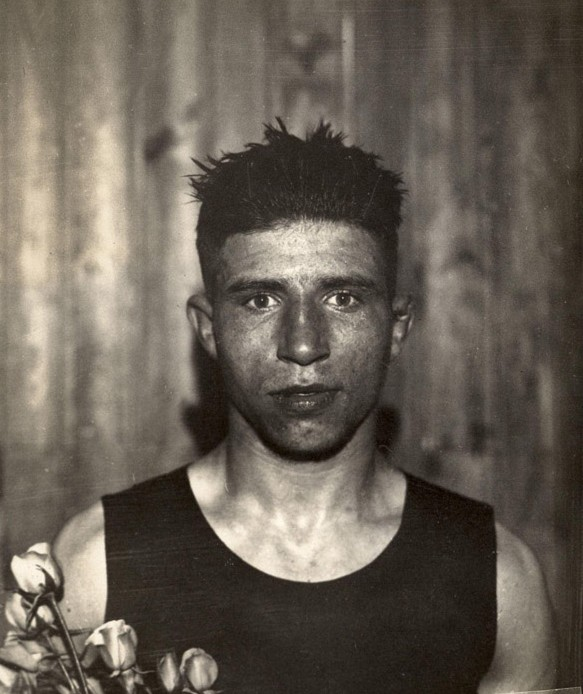
Bep van Klaveren

Rotterdam has a long boxing tradition starting with Bep van Klaveren (1907–1992), aka 'The Dutch Windmill', Gold medal winner of the 1928 Amsterdam Olympics, followed by professional boxers like Regilio Tuur and Don Diego Poeder.

=== Swimming ===
Rotterdam's swimming tradition started with Marie Braun, also known as Zus (sister) Braun, who was coached to a gold medal at the 1928 Amsterdam Olympics by her mother, Ma Braun, and 3 European titles three years later in Paris. In her career as a 14-time national champion, she broke 6 world records. Ma Braun later also coached the Rotterdam-born, three-times Olympic champion Rie Mastenbroek during the Berlin Olympics in 1936. In later years, Inge de Bruijn became a Rotterdam sports icon as a triple Olympic gold medal winner in 2000 and a triple European gold medal winner in 2001.

=== Sailing ===
Olympic gold medalist, in the O-Jolle during the 1936 Olympics, Daan Kagchelland was born in Rotterdam and was a member of the Rotterdamsche Zeil Vereeniging. The Kralingse Plas was and is still a source of Olympic sailors like Koos de Jong, Ben Verhagen, Henny Vegter, Serge Kats and Margriet Matthijsse.

=== Motorcycle racing ===
Motorcycle speedway was staged in the Feyenoord Stadium after the Second World War. The team which raced in a Dutch league was known as the Feyenoord Tigers. The team included Dutch riders and some English and Australian riders.

=== Sportsmen of the Year election ===
Since 1986, the city has selected its best sportsman, woman and team at the Rotterdam Sports Awards Election, held in December.

=== Other famous Rotterdam athletes ===
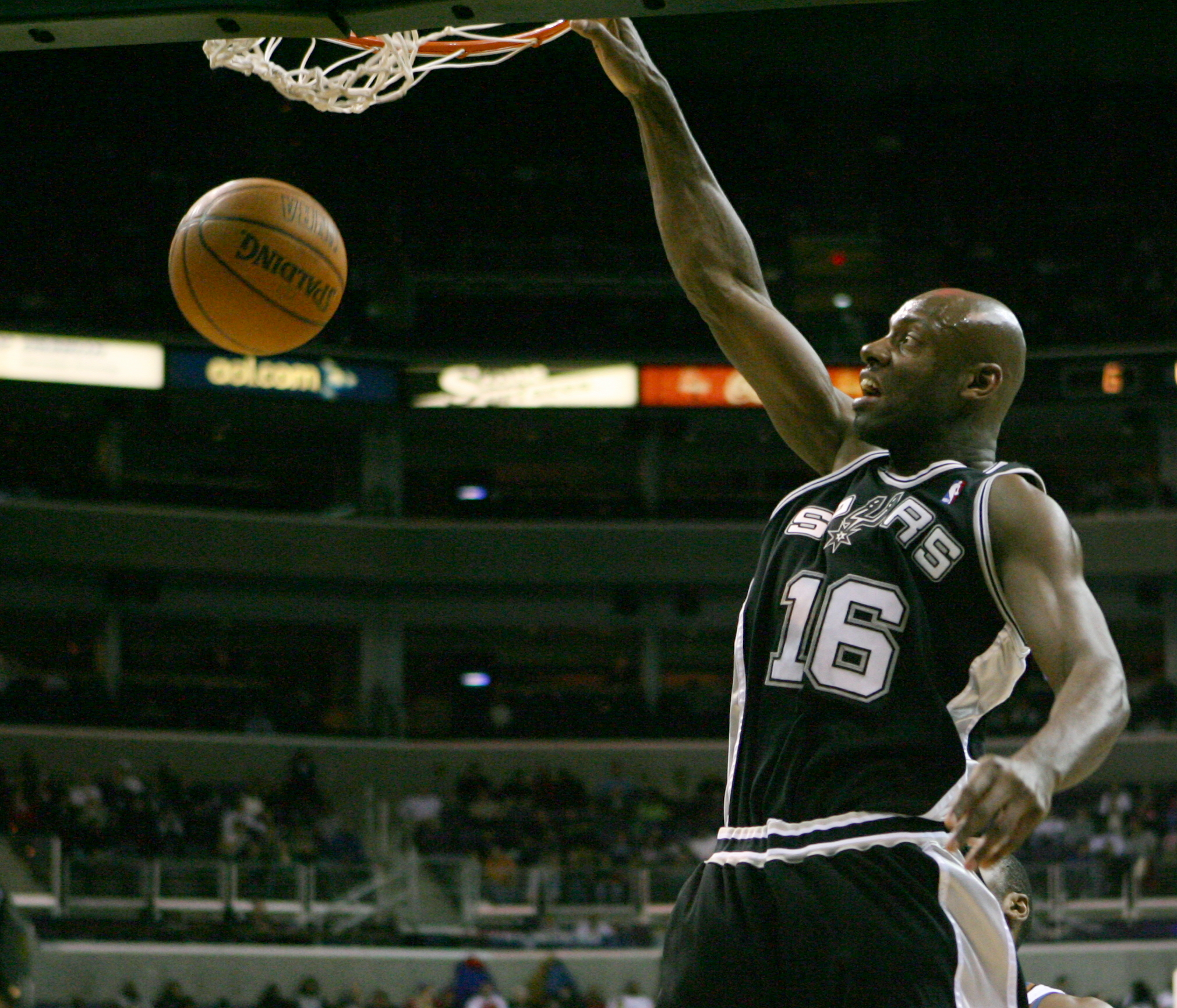
Francisco Elson

- Mia Audina, a retired Indonesia-born badminton player living in Rotterdam.
- Nelli Cooman, a Surinamese-born retired athlete who held the 60 m dash world record and was the world and European champion in that event.
- Robert Doornbos, a Rotterdam-born race car driver who competed in the Formula One.
- Robert Eenhoorn, a Rotterdam-born retired MLB shortstop, who competed for the New York Yankees, the Anaheim Angels and the New York Mets.
- Dex Elmont, a Rotterdam-born judoka, who finished second in the European championships in 2009 in the 65 to 73 kg (143 to 161 lb) division.
- Guillaume Elmont, a Rotterdam-born judoka, who became world champion in 2005 in the 73 to 81 kg (161 to 179 lb) division.
- Francisco Elson, a Rotterdam-born basketball player who played in the NBA, won the NBA Finals in 2007 with the San Antonio Spurs.
- Ignisious Gaisah, a Ghanaian-born long jumper with a personal best of 8.43 m (27.66 ft), residing in Rotterdam since 2001. Gaisah is a multiple medal winner in several international events, both as a citizen of Ghana and the Netherlands.
- Francis Hoenselaar, a Rotterdam-born female darts player, generally recognised as the best Dutch female darts player ever.
- Robert Lathouwers, an athlete born in a Rotterdam suburb, specialised in the 800 m. Lathouwers gained international notoriety when he got disqualified after shoving Irish athlete David McCarthy in the 2010 European Championships.
- Fatima Moreira de Melo, a Rotterdam-born, 2008 Olympic champion in field hockey. Moreira de Melo is a professional poker player.
- Piet Roozenburg, a Rotterdam-born draughts player, who was the world champion from 1948 to 1956 and the 8-time Dutch champion.
- Betty Stöve, a Rotterdam-born retired female tennis doubles specialist and 10-time Grand Slam winner.
- Ingmar Vos, a Rotterdam-born decathlete, with a personal best of 8224 points.

== Yearly events ==
Rotterdam hosts several annual events unique to the city. It hosts the Zomercarnaval (Summer Carnaval), the second-largest Caribbean carnival in Europe, originally called the Antillean Carnival. Other events include the North Sea Jazz Festival, the largest jazz festival in Europe, and a three-day-long maritime extravaganza called the World Port Days, celebrating the Port of Rotterdam.

- January:
  - Six Days of Rotterdam – Cycling, Rotterdam Ahoy
  - International Film Festival Rotterdam
- February:
  - Rotterdam Open – Tennis, Rotterdam Ahoy
  - Art Rotterdam – International art fair, Van Nellefabriek
- April–June:
  - Rotterdam Marathon
  - Poetry International
  - Koningsdag Festival (27 April)
  - CHIO (Concours Hippique International Officiel) Rotterdam
  - Roparun
- July:
  - North Sea Jazz Festival (second weekend of July)
  - Summer Carnival
- August:
  - Pleinbioscoop
  - Dag van de Romantische Muziek (Romantic music festival)
  - Rotterdam Rave Festival
- September:
  - The World Port Days
- November/December
  - Sinterklaas (last weekend before 5 December)
  - Boterletterwedstrijden (sailing regatta for international classes)

== Transportation ==
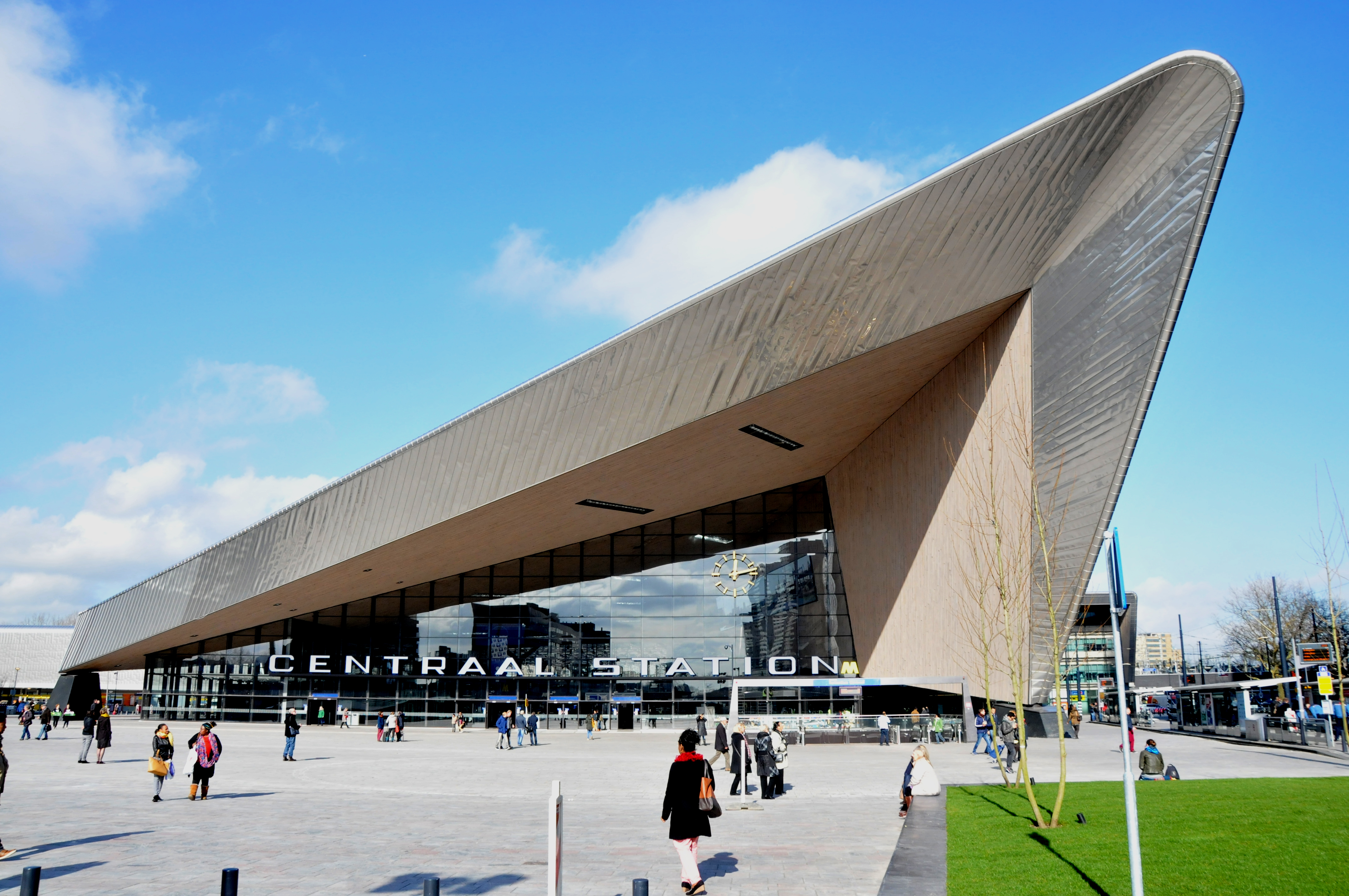
Rotterdam's new Central Station reopened in March 2014, designed to handle up to 320,000 passengers daily.

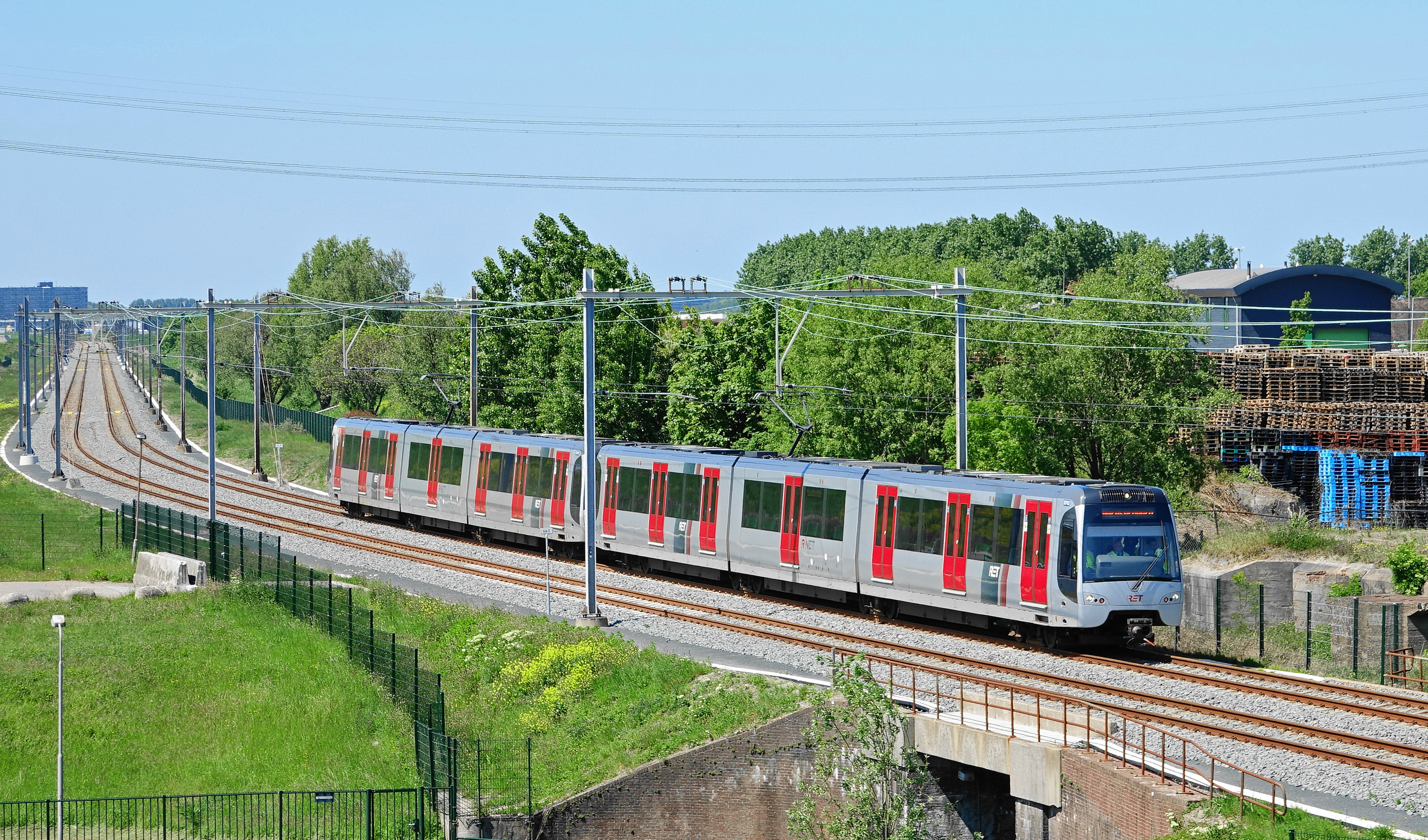
A Bombardier 5700 series EMU between Vlaardingen and Hoek van Holland

Rotterdam offers connections by international, national, regional and local public transport systems, as well as by the Dutch motorway network.

Several motorways form part of the Rotterdam ring road; the A20 (Ring North), the A16 (Ring East), A15 (Ring South), and the A4. The following two other motorways also serve Rotterdam: the A13 and the A29. Rotterdam is also home to several tunnels like the Beneluxtunnel and several bridges.

Rotterdam is served by one international airport. Rotterdam The Hague Airport (formerly known as Zestienhoven) is the third-largest airport in the country. The much larger Amsterdam Airport Schiphol is more frequently used by people travelling to and from Rotterdam. The airport is located 58 km (36 mi) north east of Rotterdam. NS operates direct train services between Rotterdam and Schiphol.

The main Rotterdam Centraal station is well connected to the Dutch railway network and has several international connections. Domestic destinations include Dordrecht, Breda, Eindhoven and further south. Flushing (Vlissingen) in Zeeland. The Hague, Amsterdam to the north west. Utrecht towards Groningen and Leeuwarden in the North East.

Passengers can also board direct international trains to Belgium (mostly Antwerp and Brussels) and France (mostly Paris sometimes beyond) and London UK.

Ferries also leave daily from the Europoort to Kingston Upon Hull in the UK daily, courtesy of P&O Ferries, as well as from Hoek van Holland to Harwich.

=== City level public transport ===
In Rotterdam, public transport services are provided by trains operating Nederlandse Spoorwegen services between local stations. Rotterdamse Elektrische Tram operating metro, tram and bus services and bus services by Arriva Netherlands, Connexxion, Qbuzz and Transdev Netherlands.

In 1968, Rotterdam was the first Dutch city to operate a metro system. The metro system consists of three main lines, each of which has its own variants. The metro network has 78.3 km (48.7 mi) of rail tracks, and there are 70 stations, which makes it the largest of the Benelux. 5 lines operate the system: 3 lines (A, B and C) on the east–west line and two (D and E) on the north–south line. Opened in 2006, Line E (RandstadRail) connects Rotterdam with The Hague.

The Rotterdam tramway network offers 9 regular tram lines and 4 special tram lines with a total length of 93.4 km (58.0 mi).

The Waterbus network consists of seven lines. The mainline (Line 20) stretches from Rotterdam to Dordrecht. The ferry carries about 130 passengers, and there is space for 60 bicycles.

== International relations ==
Rotterdam has city and port connections throughout the world. In 2008, the city had 13 sister cities, 12 partner cities, and 4 sister ports. Since 2008, the City of Rotterdam does not forge new sister or partner connections. Sister and partner cities are not a priority in international relations.

On 15 March 2017, the Turkish president expressed his wish that Istanbul should no longer be the twin town of Rotterdam. A speaker of the Rotterdam municipality then explained that the two cities have no official partnership. Both authorities do cooperate often.

=== Twin towns – sister cities ===
Rotterdam is twinned with:

- (United States) Baltimore (since 1985)
- (Bulgaria) Burgas (since 1976)
- (Germany) Cologne (since 1958)
- (Romania) Constanța (since 1976)
- (Germany) Dresden (since 1988)
- (Luxembourg) Esch-sur-Alzette (since 1958)
- (Poland) Gdańsk (since 1977)
- (Cuba) Havana (since 1983)
- (France) Lille (since 1958)
- (Belgium) Liège (since 1958)
- (China) Shanghai (since 1979)
- (Russia) Saint Petersburg (since 1984)
- (Italy) Turin (since 1958)
- (Turkey) Şanlıurfa (since 2023)

=== Partner cities ===
- (Belgium) Antwerp (since 1940)
- (Switzerland) Basel (since 1945)
- (Slovakia) Bratislava (since 1991)
- (Hungary) Budapest (since 1991)
- (Germany) Duisburg (since 1950)
- (South Africa) Durban (since 1991)
- (United Kingdom) Hull (since 1936)
- (Indonesia) Jakarta (since 1983)
- (Germany) Nuremberg (since 1961)
- (Japan) Osaka Prefecture (since 1984)
- (Norway) Oslo (since 1945)
- (Czech Republic) Prague (since 1991)

=== Sister ports ===
- (Japan) Kobe (since 1967)
- (South Korea) Busan (since 1987)
- (United States) Seattle (since 1969)
- (Japan) Tokyo (since 1989)

=== Places named after Rotterdam ===
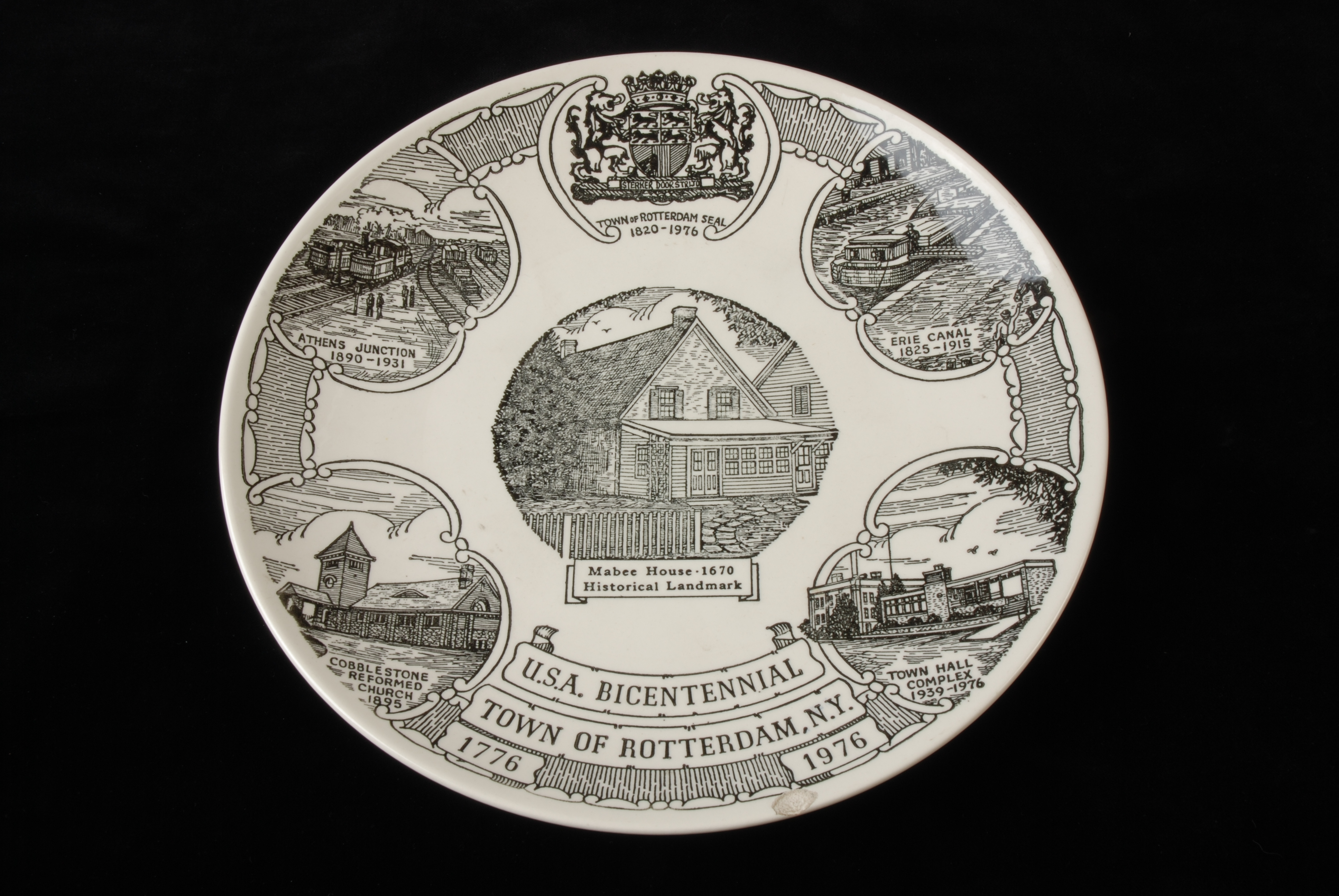
White dish, U.S.A. BICENTENNIAL TOWN OF ROTTERDAM, N.Y. 1776–1976, with black coat of arms and cityscapes

The town of Rotterdam, located in the U.S. state of New York, was founded in 1661 by Dutch settlers, who named it after the city of Rotterdam in the Netherlands, where many immigrants last touched European grounds. The town borders the city of Schenectady. Founded as a 'first class town' in 1942, Rotterdam has since adopted the Old World Rotterdam coat of arms along with the motto Sterker door Strijd (Stronger through Effort).

- Nieuw Rotterdam, Nickerie District, Suriname (1866–1875)
- Rotterdam, New York, United States
- Rotterdam, Limpopo, South Africa

== Notable people ==
- Pierre Bayle (1647–1706), enlightenment philosopher
- Leo Beenhakker (born 1942), football coach
- Giovanni van Bronckhorst (born 1975), former footballer with Feyenoord
- Jules Deelder (1944–2019), poet, writer, DJ and night mayor
- Desiderius Erasmus (1466–1536), philosopher and humanist
- Pim Fortuyn (1948–2002), assassinated politician
- Leo Fuld (1912–1997), singer
- Piet Pieterszoon Hein (1577–1629), naval fleet officer and privateer
- Jacobus Henricus van 't Hoff (1852–1911), Dutch physical chemist, first winner of the Nobel Prize in Chemistry
- Bep van Klaveren (1907–1992), boxer
- Rem Koolhaas (born 1944), internationally renowned architect
- Willem de Kooning (1904–1997), painter
- Ruud Lubbers (1939–2018), Prime Minister of the Netherlands from 1982 to 1994 and United Nations High Commissioner for Refugees from 2001 to 2005
- Bernard Mandeville (1670–1733), philosopher, political economist and satirist
- Mary Louisa Molesworth (1839–1921), an English writer of children's stories
- Coen Moulijn (1937–2011), football player of Feyenoord
- Johan van Oldebarnevelt (1547–1619), statesman of the Dutch Revolt
- Jan Jacob van Oosterzee (1817–1882), a Dutch divine
- Colonel Tom Parker (1909–1997), manager of Elvis Presley
- Robin van Persie (born 1983), Feyenoord forward and Dutch international footballer
- James Scott, 1st Duke of Monmouth (1649–1685), English nobleman and military officer
- Marten Toonder (1912–2005), comic writer
- Maarten Tromp (1598–1653) and Cornelis Tromp (1629–1691), Dutch admirals
- Angela Visser (born 1966), model and actress, Miss Holland 1988 and Miss Universe 1989

== In popular culture ==
Rotterdam features in Edgar Allan Poe's short story "The Unparalleled Adventure of One Hans Pfaall" (1835).

Rotterdam features in J.T. Sheridan Le Fanu's "Strange Event in the Life of Schalken the Painter" (1839).

In 1996, the British band the Beautiful South recorded a song named after this region titled "Rotterdam (or Anywhere)".

Part of Jackie Chan's 1998 film Who Am I? is set in Rotterdam.

Ender's Shadow, part of the series Ender's Game, is partially set in Rotterdam.

In the 2004 video game Hitman: Contracts, the missions "Rendezvous in Rotterdam" and "Deadly Cargo" are both set in Rotterdam.

The 2017 Laurence Olivier Award-winning play Rotterdam, written by Jon Brittain, is set in the city.

In Battlefield V, this city appears in two launch maps, Rotterdam and Devastation, featuring battles between the British Army and the Wehrmacht. Historically, the Witte Huis was almost untouched by the WWII bombings, and this building can be seen both in-game and in the real world.

== Gallery ==
Koningin Emmaplein

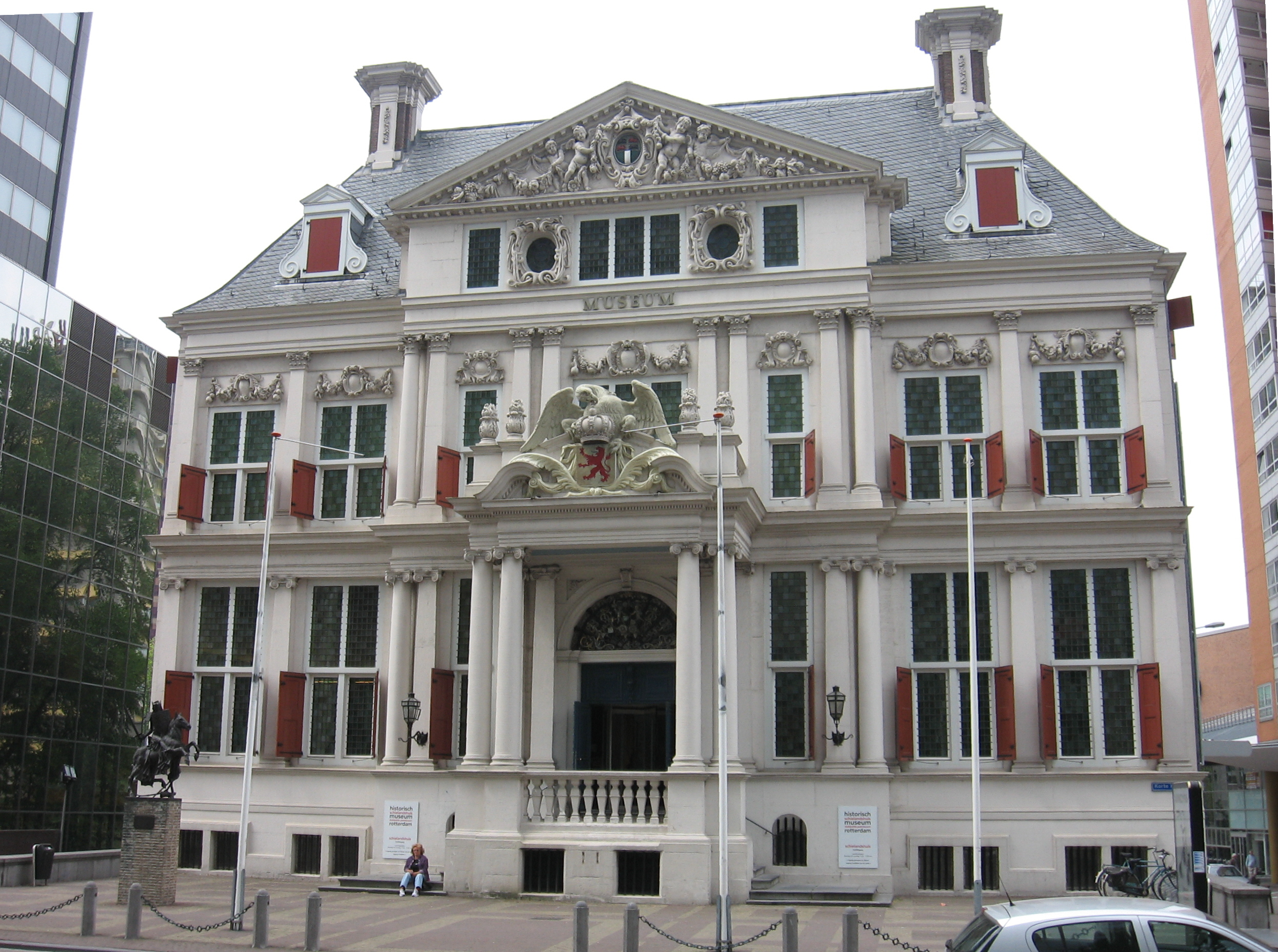
The Schielandshuis

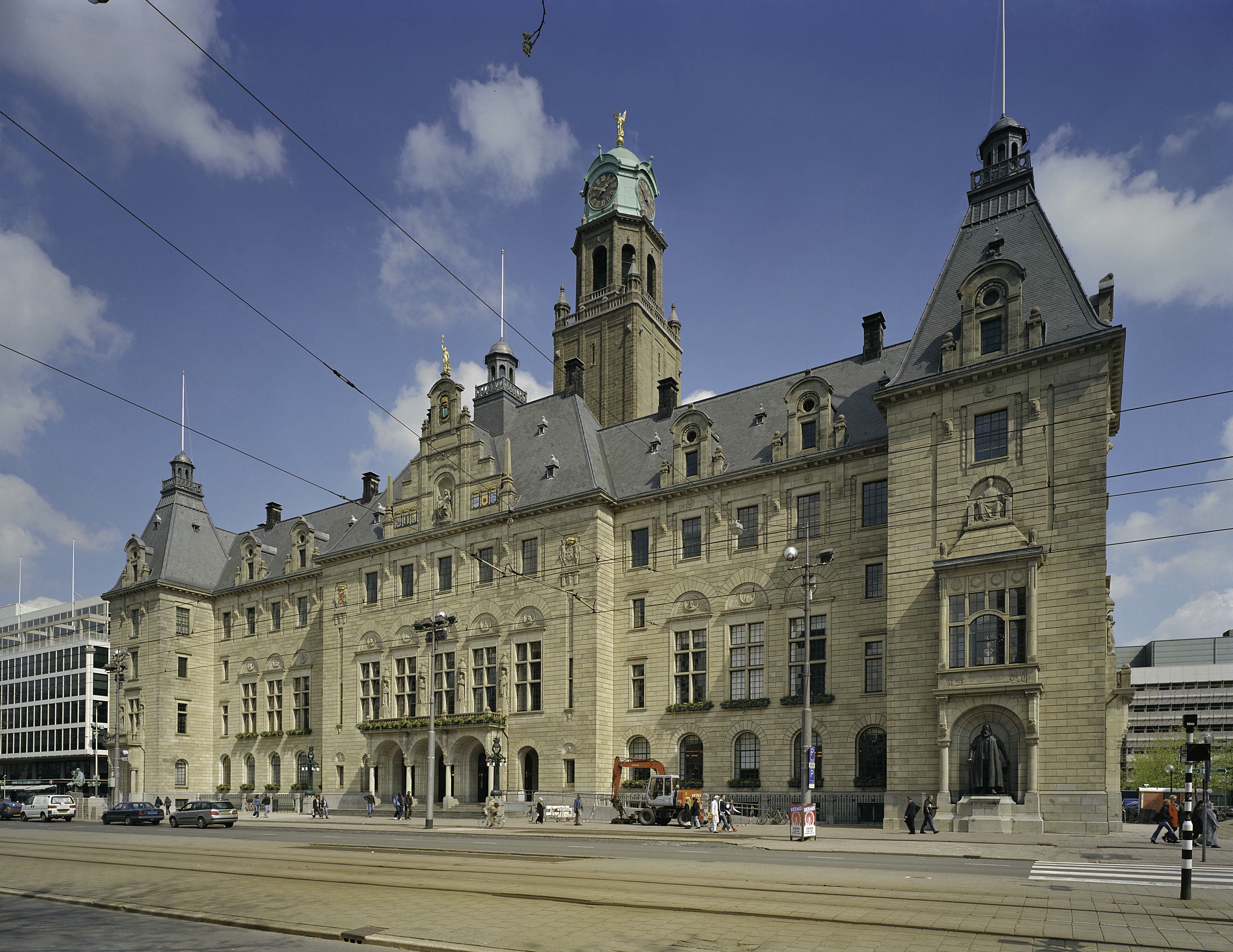
Rotterdam City Hall

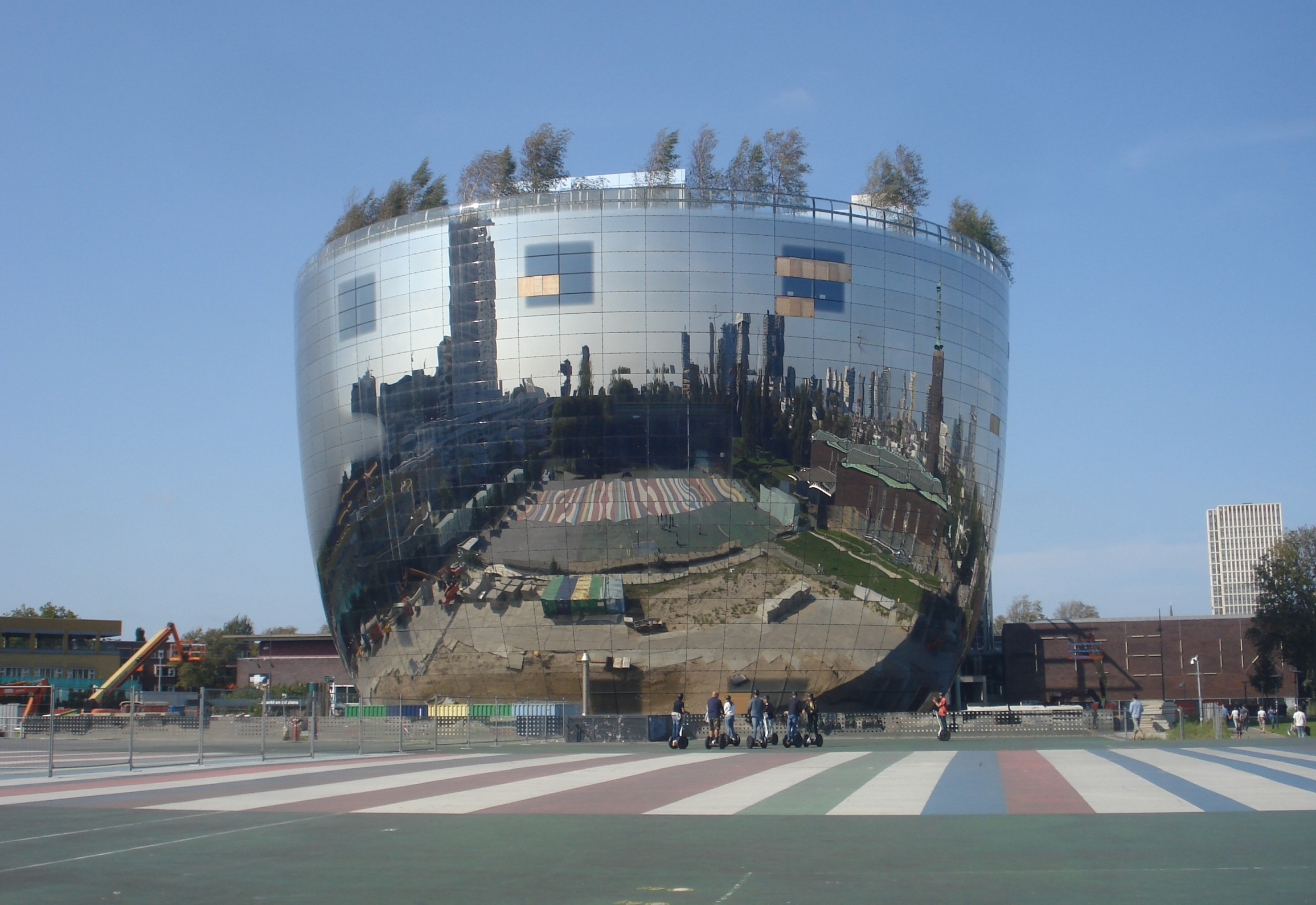
Depot Museum Boijmans Van Beuningen, It is the first publicly accessible art depot in the world.

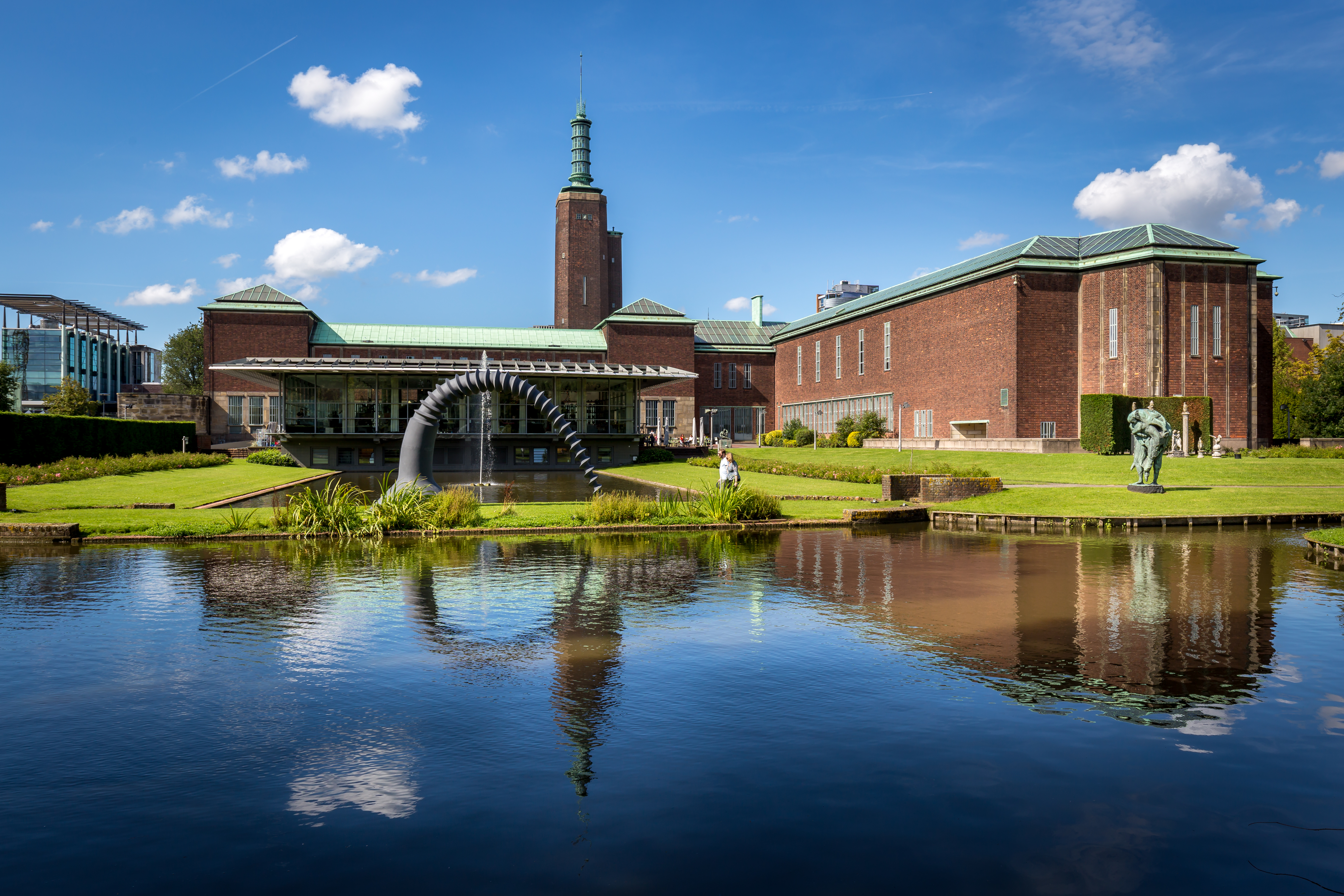
Museum Boijmans Van Beuningen

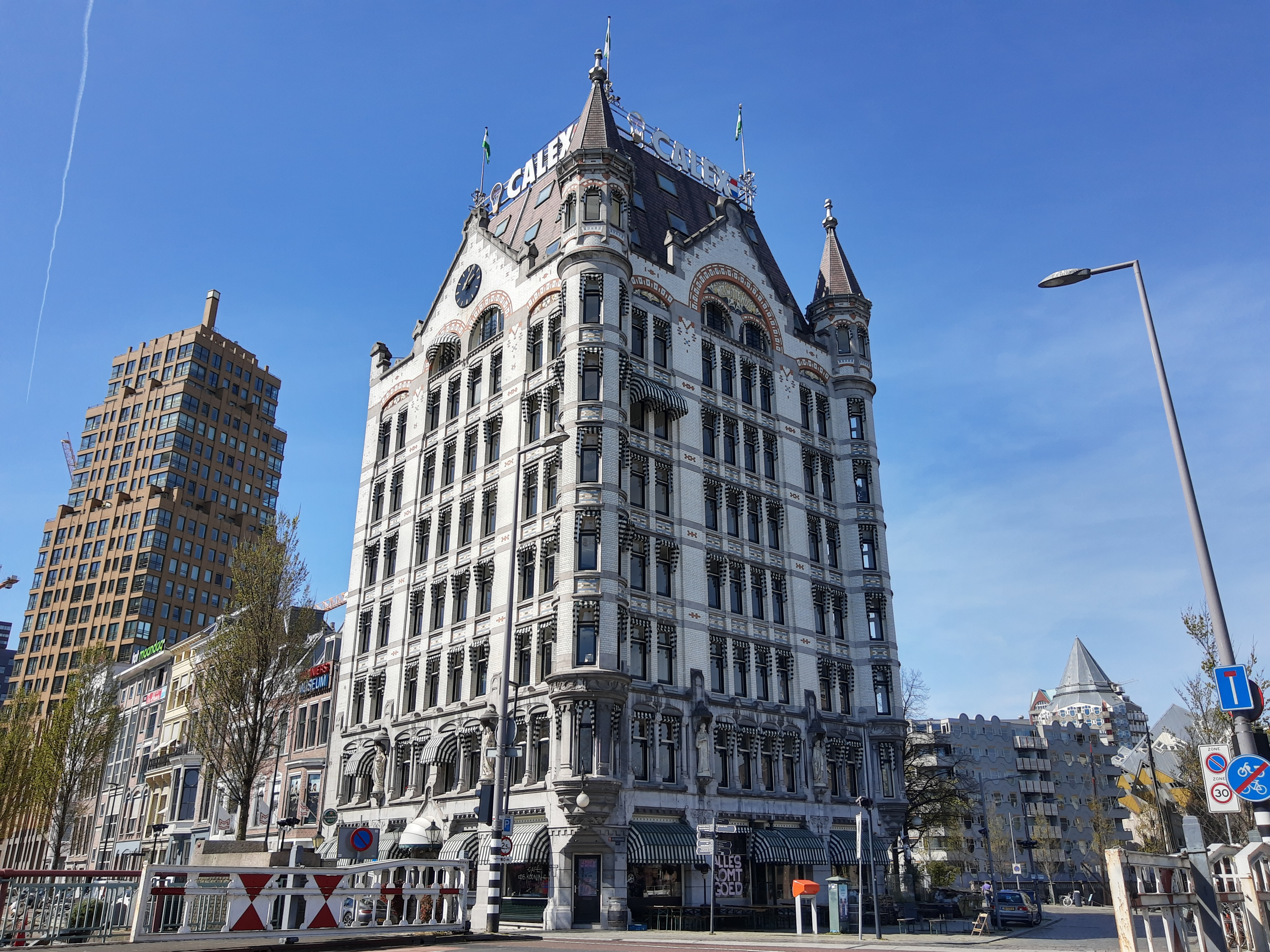
Witte Huis, the first high-rise building in Europe.

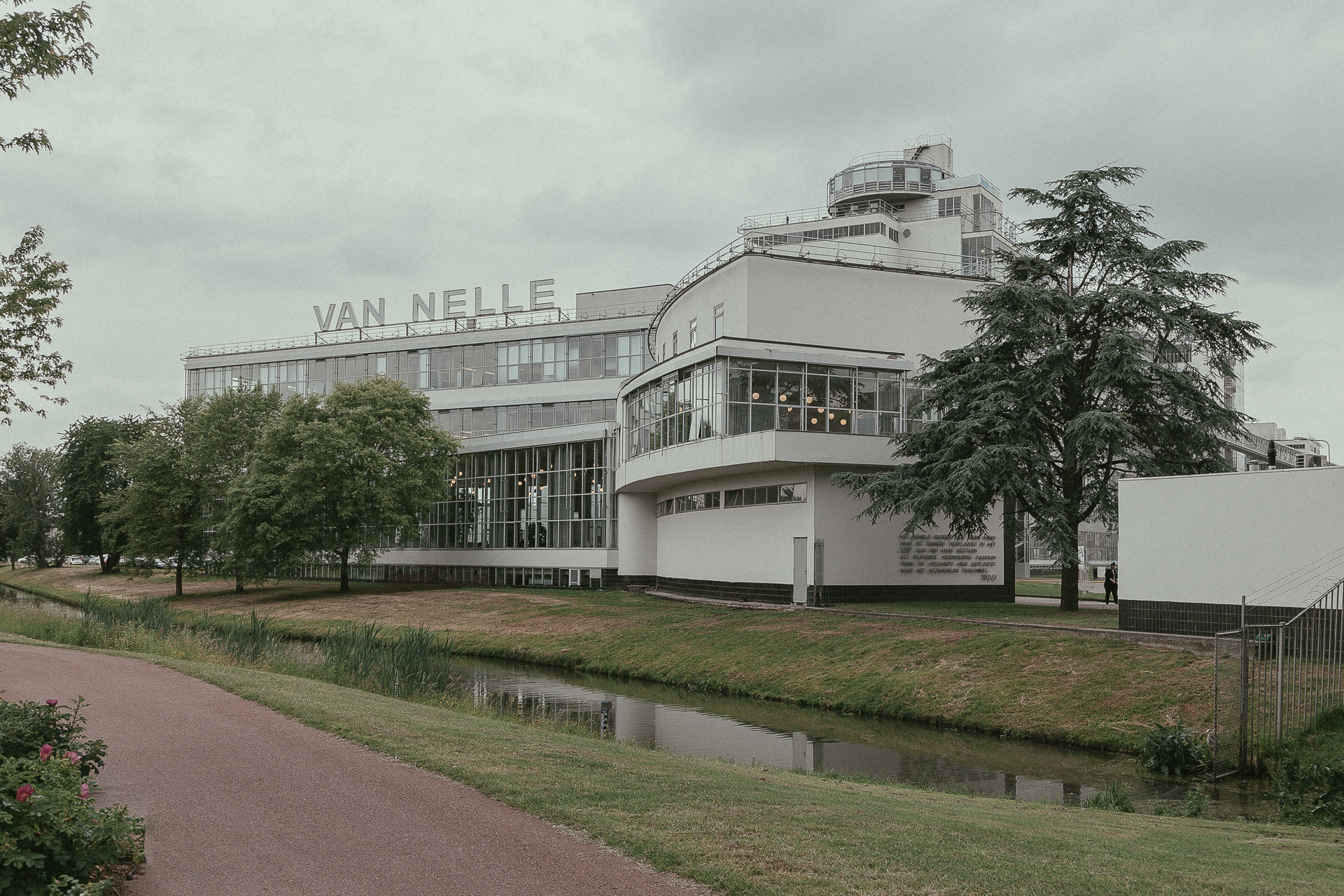
Van Nelle Factory, UNESCO World Heritage Site since 2014

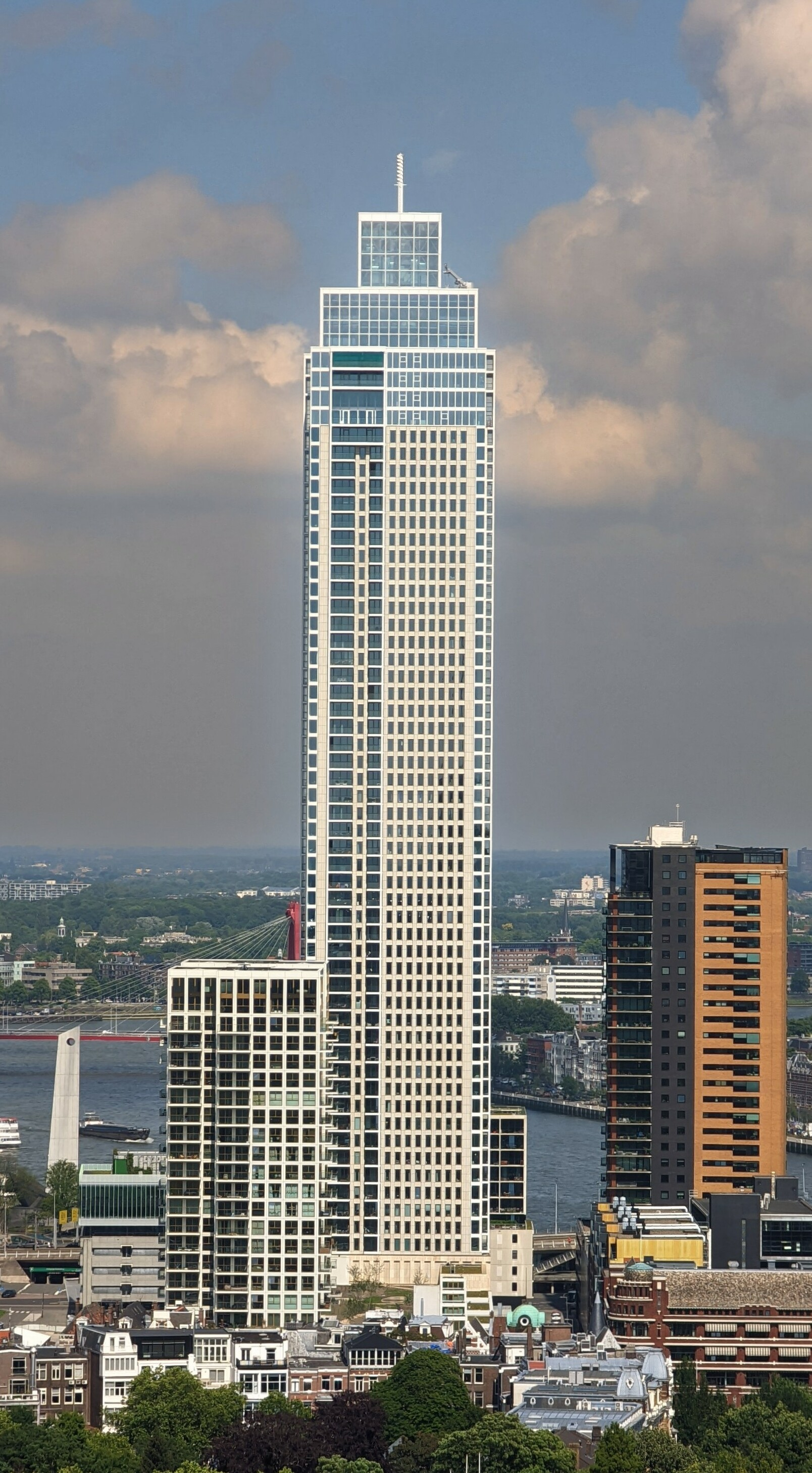
De Zalmhaven

== See also ==
- World's busiest ports, by type of port (a "list of lists")

| Preceded by Event created | World Gymnaestrada host city 1953 | Succeeded by Zagreb, Yugoslavia (1957) |

| Preceded by Tel Aviv (2019) | Eurovision Song Contest host city 2020/2021 | Succeeded by Turin (2022) |
