= Allied bombing of Rotterdam in World War II =

Coordinates: 51°55′N 4°26′E

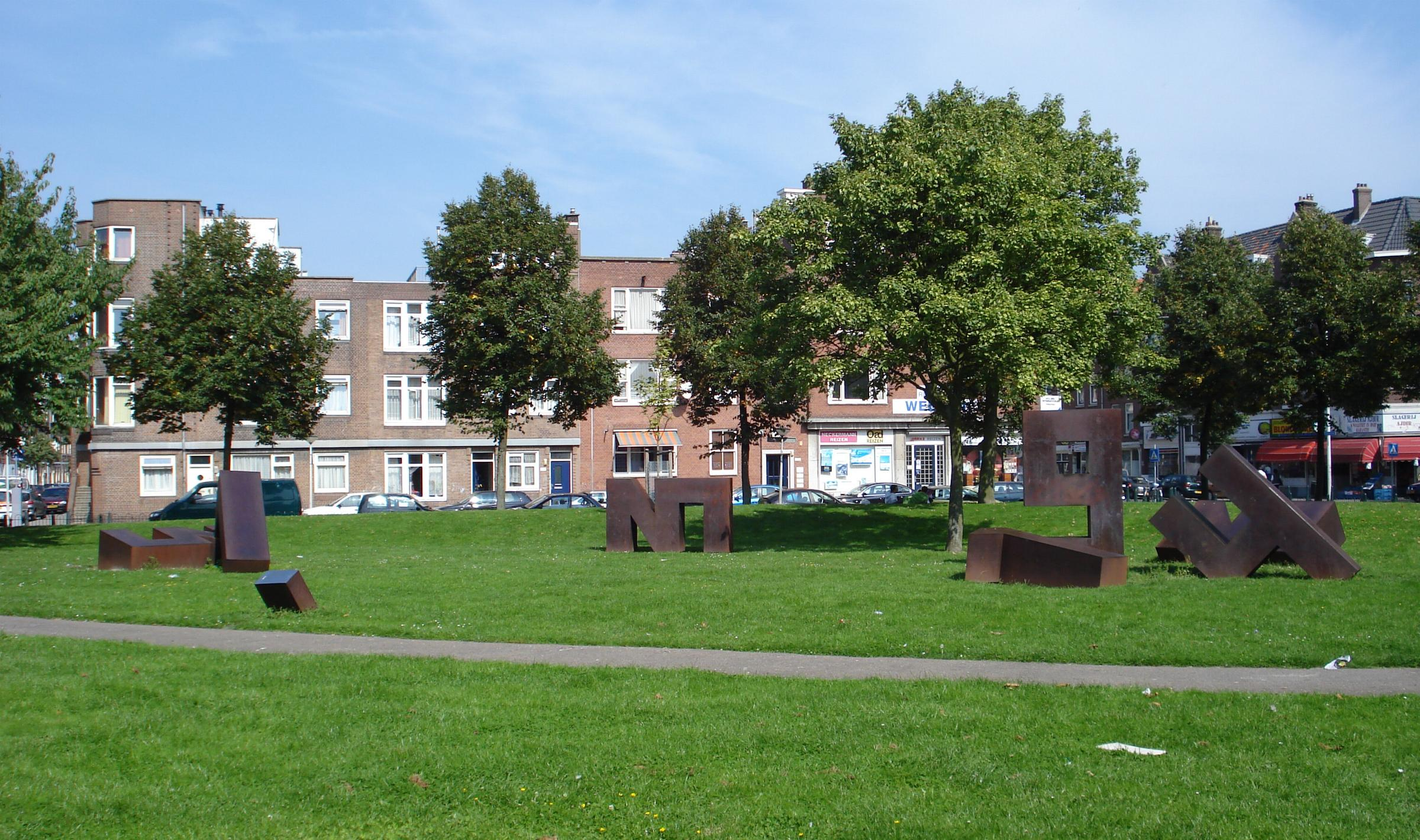
The "Forgotten Bombardment" by Mathieu Ficheroux. The sculpture, commemorating the Allied bombing of Rotterdam on 31 March 1943, was unveiled in 1993.

During the German occupation of the Netherlands between 1940 and 1945, during the Second World War, Allied air forces carried out a number of operations over Rotterdam and the surrounding region. They included bombing strategic installations; leaflet-dropping; and during, the last week of the war, dropping emergency food supplies.

In one incident, during a raid on the shipyards and dock area, the United States Army Air Forces accidentally bombed a residential area and killed hundreds. Until the 1990s, the raid that took place on 31 March 1943 was not mentioned in local school history lessons about the region's war time experiences. In the runup to the 50th anniversary of the raid, newspaper articles and a television documentary by Mr. van der Wel broke the taboo, and the raid is now acknowledged with a memorial in a local park to the "Forgotten Bombardment".

== History ==
Allied air forces (primarily the Royal Air Force and the United States Army Air Forces) carried out scores of raids on Rotterdam and the surrounding area. About half the raids were within the city limits, the others being clustered around Nieuwe Waterweg, Schiedam (shipyards) and Pernis (petrochemical industries and fuel storage tanks). During the 128 raids casualties amounted to 884 killed and a further 631 wounded.

An attack on the city of Rotterdam on 31 March 1943 was made by 102 USAAF bombers. The target was the shipyards and dock area, in the west of Rotterdam. The bombing took place at 12:25 (BST) in cloudy conditions, and only 33 B-17s dropped 99 tons of bombs. The industrial area between Keilehaven and Merwehaven was hit. "A combination of strong wind and overcast conditions also caused great damage to the nearby residential areas, especially in the Bospolder-Tussendijken District". The death toll was between 326 and 401 (Note: The estimates of the total killed varies between sources: "326 killed and "400" injured (Stalk 1993), 341 killed(Kuper 2011, p. 77) and 401 killed (Rotterdam municipal staff 2008).) and made between 10,000 and 20,000 people homeless. The bombardment became known as the "Forgotten Bombardment". Gijzing Park contains a memorial in remembrance of those killed and maimed by the attack (the monument was created by Mathieu Ficheroux and was unveiled by Dutch Prime Minister Ruud Lubbers on 31 March 1993).

== Timeline ==
Allied raids on Rotterdam during Second World War
Rdl	Date	Target/Type	Notes
	11 June 1941/12 June 1941	Diversionary raid at night	339 bombing sorties were flown to a number of targets of which 3 were flown to Rotterdam and Emden.
	14/15 January 1942	Diversionary raid at night	The main target was Hamburg. Rotterdam was attacked by 11 aircraft. One of several diversionary raids.
	28/29 January 1942	Diversionary raid at night	The main targets were Munster and Boulogne. 29 Whitleys to Rotterdam as a diversionary raid.
	21 August 1942	Shipyards	This is mission 4 for Bomber Command of the 8th Air Force of the USAAF (the first 8th Airforce Bomber command mission was 4 days earlier on 17 August 1942). 12 B-17s were to bomb the shipyards at Rotterdam, but the mission was aborted due to an attack by 25 Bf 109s and Fw 190s; the bombers claim 2–5–6 Luftwaffe aircraft (2 confirmed destroyed – 5 unconfirmed destroyed – 6 probably destroyed) for the loss of one damaged bomber, one airman killed and five wounded. The failure of the mission was put down to lack of coordination with the Spitfire escorts.
	27 August 1942	Shipyards	8th Air Force mission 6: At 17:40, 7 out of 9 B-17s bomb the shipyards at Rotterdam, 3 B-17s are damaged and one airman is wounded.
	7 September 1942	Wilton shipyards	As part of Mission 11, 15 B-17s attacked Wilton shipyards at Rotterdam. The weather was bad and only four bombers bombed near the target. The USAAF claimed to have shot down 8 enemy aircraft, probably downed four more and possibly one, and sustained damage to four bombers, with one man killed and three wounded.
	4 March 1943	Shipyards	As part of mission 39, 28 B-17s raided the shipyards at Rotterdam. The target was hit with 70 tons of bombs starting at 10:20. The last bomber completed the mission about a minute later.
	28 March 1943	Docks	24 Ventura bombers, escorted by fighters, bombed Rotterdam docks. At least six ships were hit and a fire was started in a dockside warehouse. No bombers were lost.
	29 March 1943	Dock	61 Ventura bombers flew two raids on the Rotterdam docks and another one on a railway at Abbeville, but due to bad weather only the second raid on Rotterdam delivered its bombs on target. No bombers were lost.
	31 March 1943	Shipyards and dock area	Mission 48: 78 B-17s and 24 B-24s raid the shipyards and dock area. The target was clouded and only 33 B-17s drop 99 tons of bombs at 12:25. The USAAF lost one B-24 and three B-17s, with three more damaged beyond repair. One B-24 and four B-17s were damaged. By the end of the raid sixteen American airmen had been killed, ten were wounded and ten were missing. Because of inaccurate bombing hundreds of Dutch civilians were killed (see above)
	4 April 1943	Shipyard in daylight	60 Ventura bombers attacked 3 diverse sites. The 24 allocated to bomb a shipyard at Rotterdam did so successfully, losing three aircraft during the operation.
	15 May 1943	Fighter sweep	As part of Mission 57, 116 P-47 Thunderbolts flew high altitude sorties over the Amsterdam/Rotterdam area to clear the airspace of German fighters. The USAAF claimed that they damaged two enemy aircraft for the loss of one of their own with the pilot listed as missing.
	3/4 November 1943	Leaflet drop at night	Mission 120: two B-17s drop 1.5+ million leaflets on Antwerp at 19:15 and on Rotterdam at 20:08.
	19 March 1944	Leaflet drop	Mission 267: Six B-17s drop 300 bundles of leaflets on The Hague, Rotterdam, Leeuwarden, Utrecht and Amsterdam, between 12:14 and 21:33. No USAAF losses.
	21 March 1944	Leaflet drop	Mission 272: Six B-17s drop 300 bundles of leaflets on The Hague, Amsterdam, Leeuwarden, Rotterdam and Utrecht, between 21:02 and 21:33. No USAAF losses.
	22 May 1944	Leaflet drop	Mission 363: Four B-17s drop 320,000 leaflets on The Hague, Haarlem, Rotterdam and Utrecht. 3. No USAAF losses.
	6 September 1944	Strafing	Mission 607: As part of a regional sweep by 49 P-38s and 165 P-47s, the rail and highway traffic in the Rotterdam area is strafed. In the overall operation one P-38 and three P-47s are shot down by flak batteries. A further five P-38s and seven P-47s are damaged.
	29 December 1944	E-boat pens	16 Lancaster bombers of No. 617 Squadron attacked the E-boat pens at Rotterdam and hit the pens several times. No aircraft were lost.
	1 May 1945	Food drop	Mission 973: As part of a relief effort flown by 396 B-17s to the Netherlands, 237 B-17s dropped food supplies into Rotterdam.

== See also ==
- German bombing of Rotterdam
- Allied bombings of Amsterdam-Noord
- Bombing of the Bezuidenhout
