= Blauwburgwal =

Canal in Amsterdam

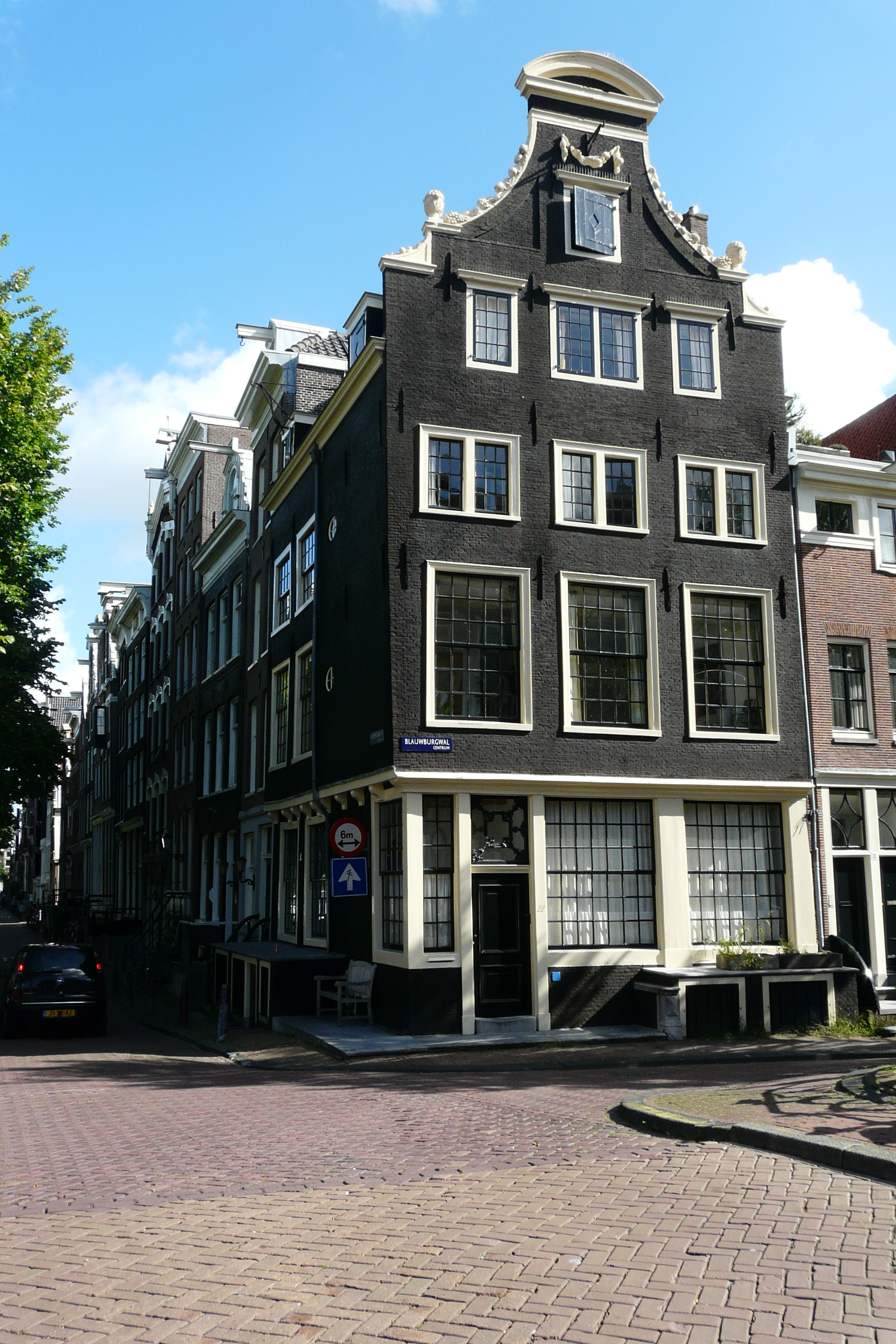
- Blauwburgwal 22

- Location within Amsterdam
- Length: .1 kilometres (0.062 mi)
- Location: Amsterdam
- Postal code: 1015
- Coordinates: 52.376586°N 4.890597°E
- East end: Singel
- To: Herengracht

Construction
- Completion: 16th century

The Blauwburgwal (literally: Dutch: blue fortress wall) is a canal in Amsterdam between the Singel (at Lijnbaanssteeg) and the Herengracht (at Herenstraat). It is close to the city center and part of the west Grachtengordel (canal belt).

Halfway along the northeast side, the Langestraat meets the Blauwburgwal. The canal has two bridges, one beside Singel bridge 11 and the other beside Herengracht bridge 19.

== History ==
The canal was dug at the end of the 16th century. Before the city expansion of 1612, the Blauwburgwal was called Blauwburgwal Lijnbaansgracht as an extension of Lijnbaanssteeg. When a new Lijnbaansgracht was created during the expansion, the name was changed to Blauwburgwal naar de Blauwe Brug. The Blauwe Brug (Blue Bridge) across the Singel is now called the Lijnbaansbrug.

On 11 May 1940 part of the Blauwburgwal was destroyed by a German bombing. Fourteen buildings were destroyed and 44 were killed.

== Architecture ==
The facade of Blauwburgwal 22 has an elevated bell-gable dating from 1669. The bell gable developed from the neck gable. This building was mainly built between 1660 and 1790.

Blauwburgwal 22 is unique in its kind. It is the only example of a raised bell gable: an extra step with a small claw piece. The gable has curved side walls ornamented with fruit and urns. The house is owned by the Hendrick de Keyser Association.

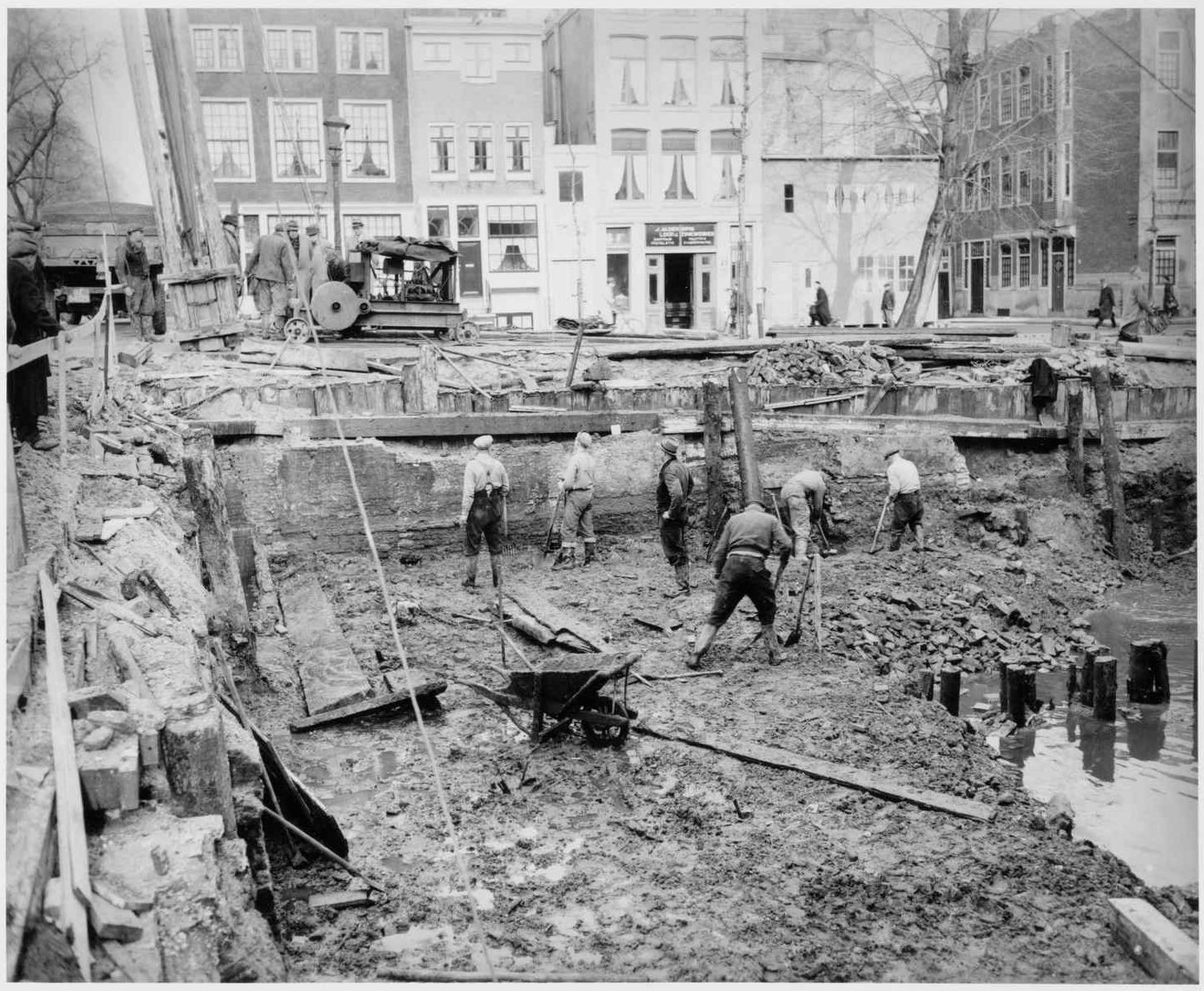
Pile driving on the Blauwburgwal, 19 February 1951

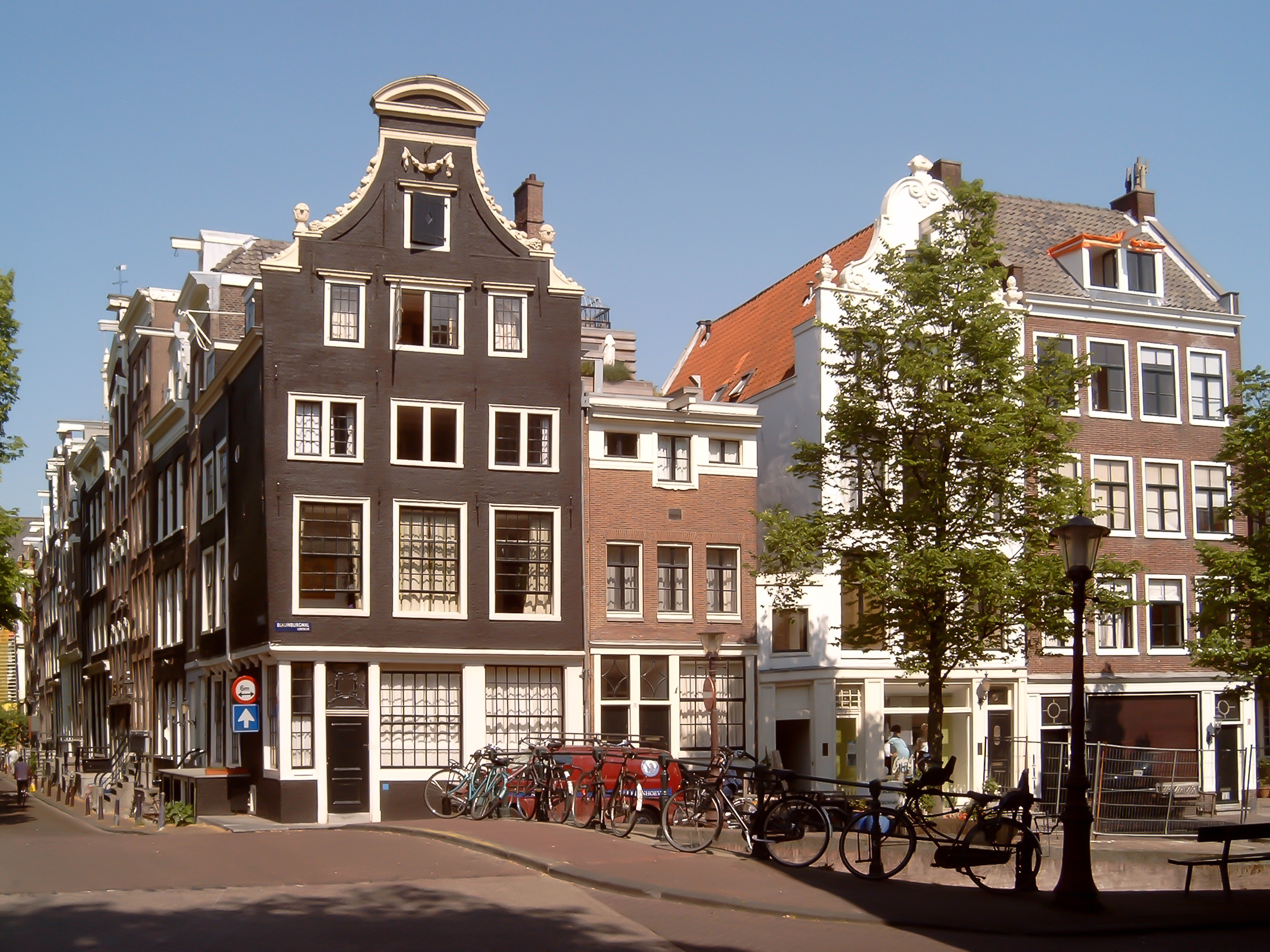
Canal houses at Blauwburgwal-Herengracht, bridge 19 in foreground

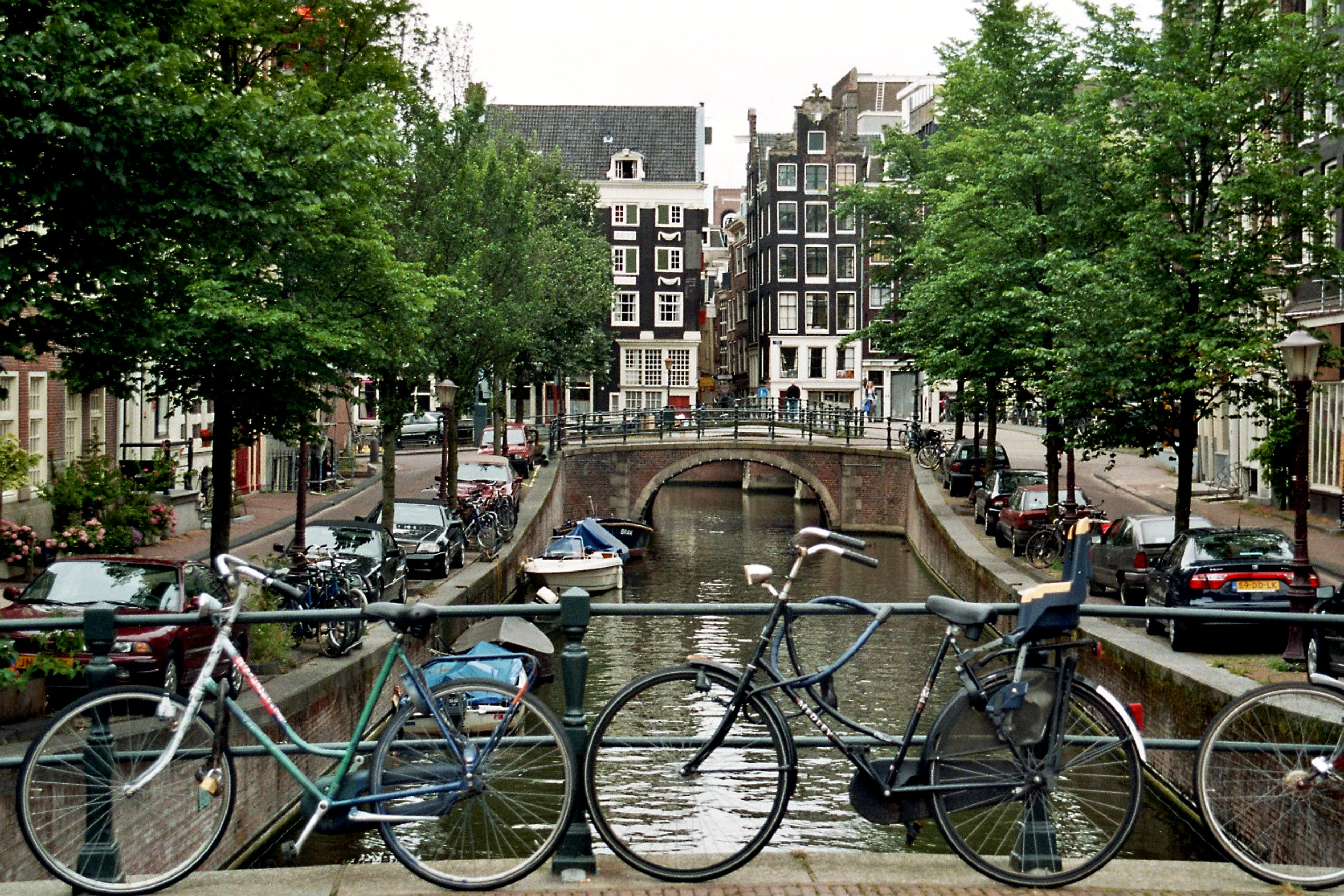
View of Blauwburgwal

== See also ==
- Canals of Amsterdam
