= Bombing of Amsterdam =

1940 bombardment of Amsterdam

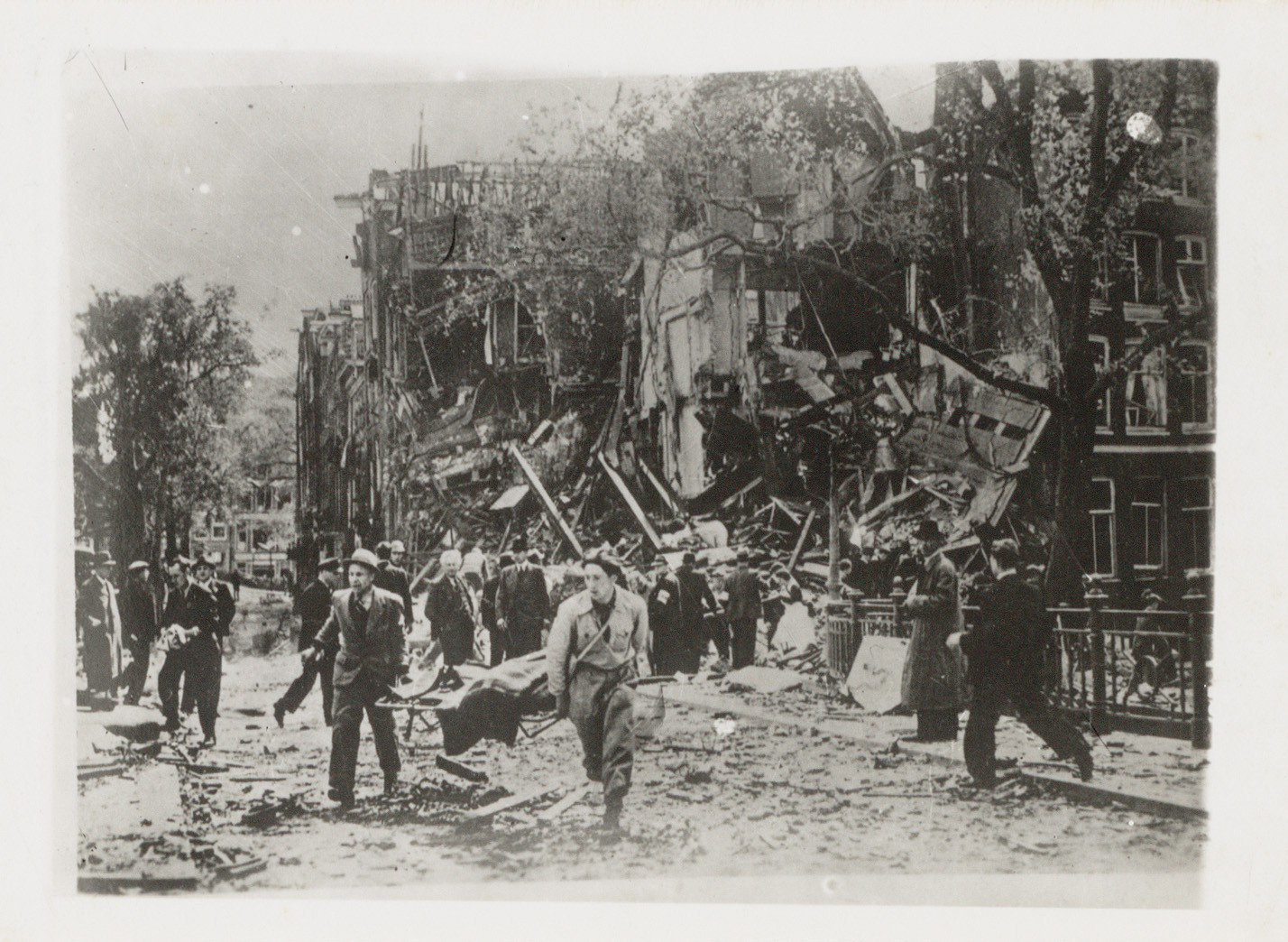
Victims being removed

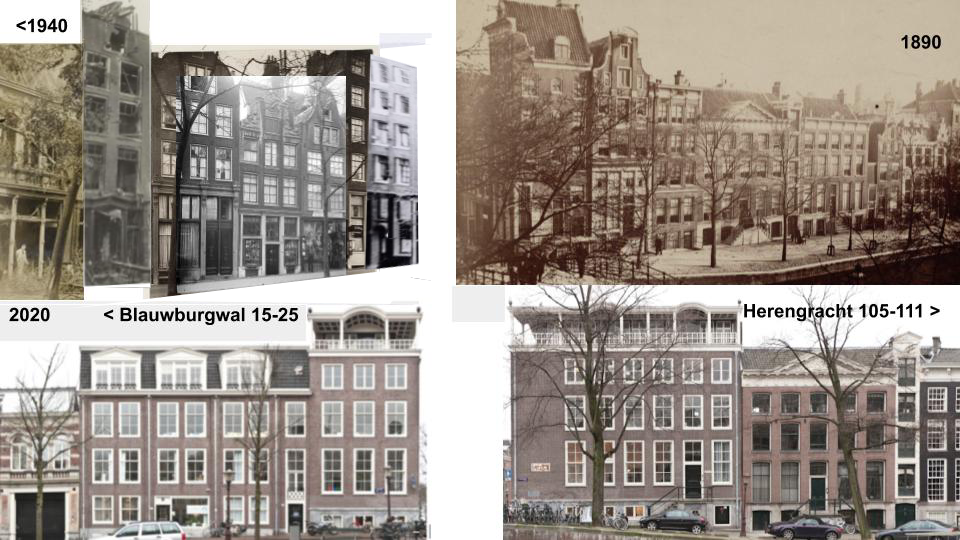
A visual reconstruction of the pre-war Blauwburgwal based on archive photos.

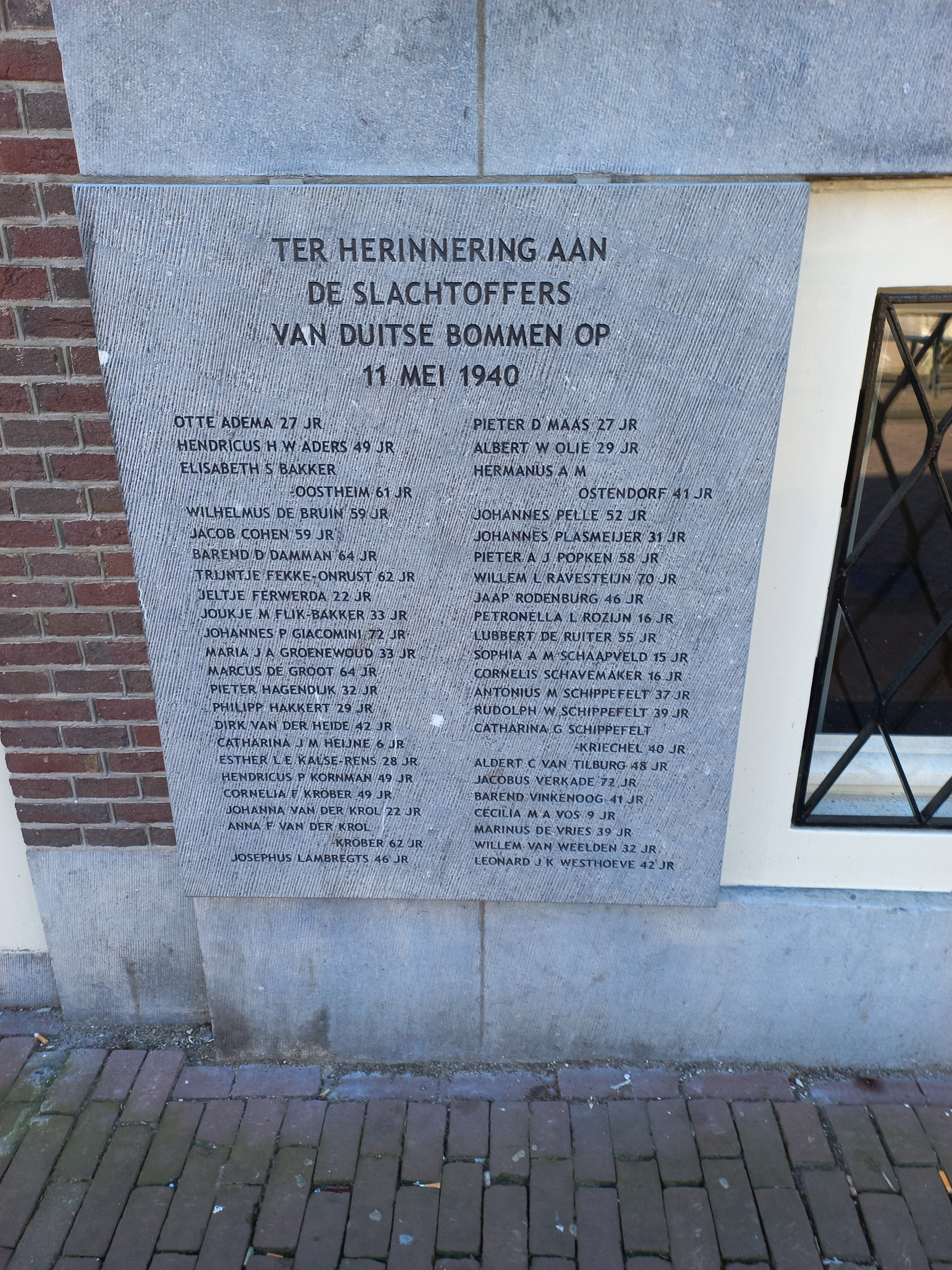
Memorial plaque installed in 2020

The first bombing of Amsterdam in the Second World War, and the only attack on the city center, occurred on 11 May 1940 when a German Junkers Ju 88 bomber dropped four bombs on the Blauwburgwal neighborhood and completely destroyed seven buildings and a café near the Herengracht. The attack killed 44 and wounded 79. Two other bombs exploded in the canals and a fourth landed in the water without exploding, where it remained.

== Possible explanations ==
The bombing was an isolated event and did not have any apparent military goal. Two possible explanations have been given:

- The Luftwaffe bombed Schiphol on the same day; one of the bombers might have been damaged by anti-aircraft batteries in Sloten and released its bombs to lose weight, unintentionally dropping them in a civilian area.
- The bomber could have been targeting the post office behind the Royal Palace, which was housing a Dutch army communications center. If so, the bombs were dropped 350 meters short of the target.

== Commemoration ==
Dutch newspapers reported the bombing at the time, but the major bombing of Rotterdam a few days later received more attention, and further coverage was banned by the German occupiers. The killed civilians were buried without being specifically identified as bombing victims, and were only identified in 2016.

The bombing is remembered every year. In May 2020, a memorial plaque with the victims' names was unveiled in the neighborhood.

== See also ==
- Allied bombings of Amsterdam-Noord
