= Allied bombings of Amsterdam-Noord =

Part of World War II

Coordinates: 52°23′45″N 4°54′30″E

- Part of World War II
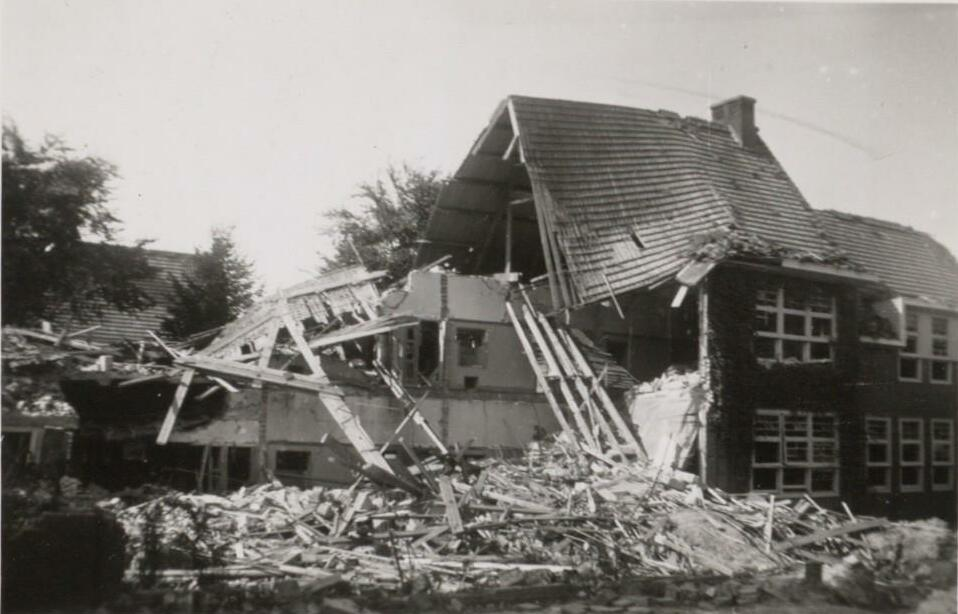
- Bewaarschool Buiksloterdijk after the bombardment
- Operational scope: Strategic air bombing
- Location: Amsterdam-Noord
- Commanded by: Allied Forces
- Target: Fokker aircraft factory (Papaverweg 31-33)
- Date: 17 July 1943, 25 July 1943, 28 July 1943
- Executed by: USAAF, RAF, FAFL
- Outcome: 130 houses were destroyed, 206 houses were severely damaged, and 676 houses suffered glass and roof damage
- Casualties: At least 206 killed At least 119 seriously injured
- Map of Amsterdam

The Allied bombings of Amsterdam-Noord took place in July 1943 during the German occupation of the Netherlands in World War II. Three strategic bombing attacks by Allied Forces were aimed at the former Fokker Aircraft Factory in the northern part of Amsterdam, which was of interest as the factory was confiscated by the Nazis and employees were forced to produce aircraft for the Luftwaffe. However, only 7 out of the 326 bombs from these three airstrikes hit their target, while the others fell on the surrounding residential area, resulting in the loss of more than 206 lives in total. The attacks were the most damaging and deadly bombardment of Amsterdam during the Second World War, and the most disastrous airstrike the city has ever endured. As these were Allied attacks, the losses and trauma caused by the event have always been a sensitive and painful topic for the citizens of Amsterdam-Noord.

== Time line ==
Three times within 11 days, the former Fokker Factory in Amsterdam-Noord was the target of strategic bombings by the Allied Forces:

Saturday 17 July 1943 — United States Army Air Forces (USAAF)
41 B-17 Flying Fortress heavy bombers of the US Eighth Air Force came into action. The bombing was disastrous; more than 200 high-explosive bombs fell on residential areas in Amsterdam-Noord. Not a single bomb hit the factory, resulting in the deaths of 185 citizens, leaving 119 seriously injured, and hundreds injured, of which many later died from their injuries.

Sunday 25 July 1943 — Royal Air Force (RAF)
10 British B-25 Mitchell heavy bombers did manage to hit the aircraft factory and largely destroyed the complex. 4 more people were killed during this attack.

Wednesday 28 July 1943 — Free French Air Forces (FAFL)
12 French heavy bombers attempted to repeat the bombing of the factory. This time, again the factory was not hit by a single bomb out of the 48, but another 17 civilians lost their lives.

== Camouflage ==
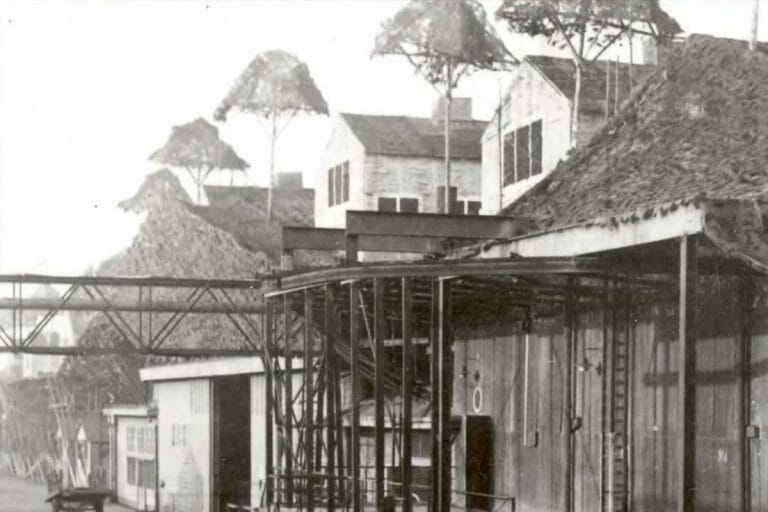
Nets, fake small houses, and trees camouflaging the roof of the Fokker Factory.

The German occupier had camouflaged the roof and sides of the factories with nets, fake small houses and trees. This made the factory look like a rustic residential area from above, which could have contributed to the fact that the factory was missed during two of the three airstrikes. However, through witness statements it appears the Allied Forces were aware of the situation of the Fokker site in detail. For example, the USAAF Bomb Groups were well aware of the fact that the aircraft factory was difficult to find. According to the crew briefing, the Fokker complex was “one of the finest pieces of camouflage ever photographed.”

== U.S. bombing ==
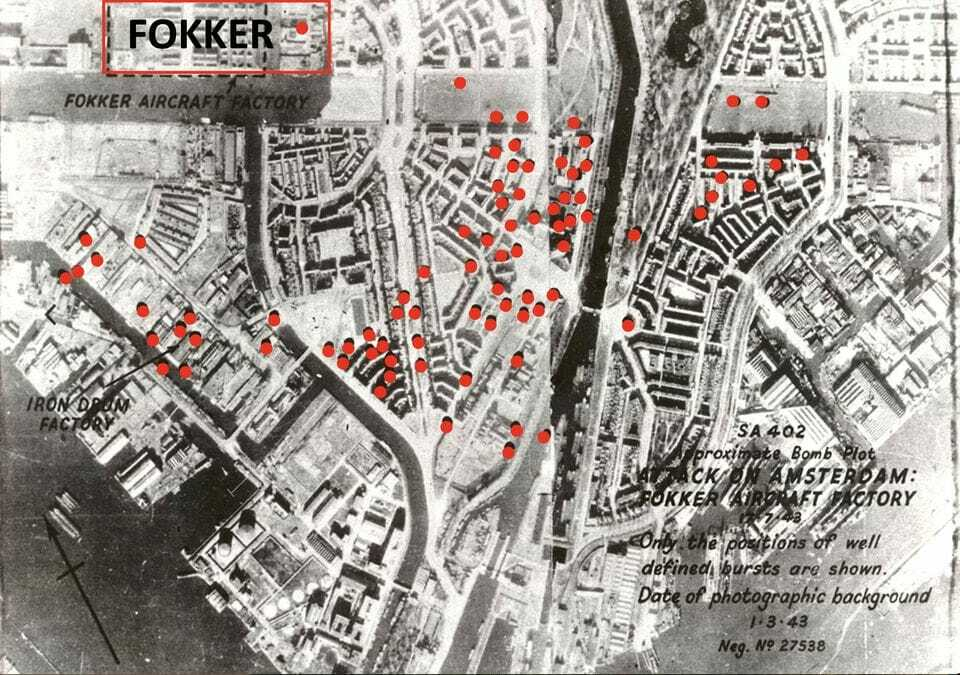
Location overview of the bombs from the USAAF 17 July 1943 bombardment on Amsterdam-Noord. Only positions of well-defined bursts are marked in red. In the top left corner is the location of the Fokker Factory marked.

=== Details ===
The attack of 17 July 1943 by the USAAF is the most severe bombardment the city of Amsterdam endured in World War II, and the resulting total devastation was enormous. In this first attempt to destroy the Fokker Factory, 41 heavy bombers (B-17 Flying Fortress) of the then inexperienced 385th (21 bombers) and 388th (20 bombers) Bomb Groups of the US Eighth Air Force had their first combat operation. On paper it seemed like a simple assignment, being a short distance from their base in eastern England and expected to meet little resistance from Luftwaffe fighters. The crews referred to such an "easy" attack as a milk run. They had received clear instructions prior to the attack: “do not bomb unless the target is seen.”

When the 41 bombers flew over IJmuiden, it became clear that the weather conditions were unfavourable. The bombardier in the lead aircraft could not identify the intended target in time due to cloud coverage, so the formation was ordered to break off the attack. However, confusion arose among the still inexperienced crew. An aircraft flying behind the lead aircraft saw the target and decided to continue to drop its bombs, followed by other aircraft behind him. The aiming and dropping failed, and the bombing was disastrous. The in-air observation of the USAAF-crew was clear: “no bursts were seen in the immediate vicinity of the Fokker complex.” In reality not a single bomb hit the intended Fokker Factory, over 200 high-explosive bombs landed 600 to 1200 metres from their target on the surrounding residential areas, a monastery, churches, and furniture and tar factories. The attack resulted in a total of 185 casualties. Hundreds were injured, of which many later died from these injuries. 130 houses were destroyed, 206 houses were severely damaged, and 676 houses suffered glass and roof damage.

=== Anne Frank ===
Anne Frank wrote in her diary on 19 juli 1943 about the American bombing of Amsterdam-Noord, which she heard and felt from her hiding place in the city centre of Amsterdam:

Amsterdam-Noord was severely bombed last Saturday. The devastation must be terrible; entire streets are in ruins. You hear of children lost in the smoldering ruins searching for their dead parents. I still get shivers just thinking about the dull, droning rumble in the distance.

— by Anne Frank, in The Diary of a Young Girl

=== Reaction of the USAAF ===
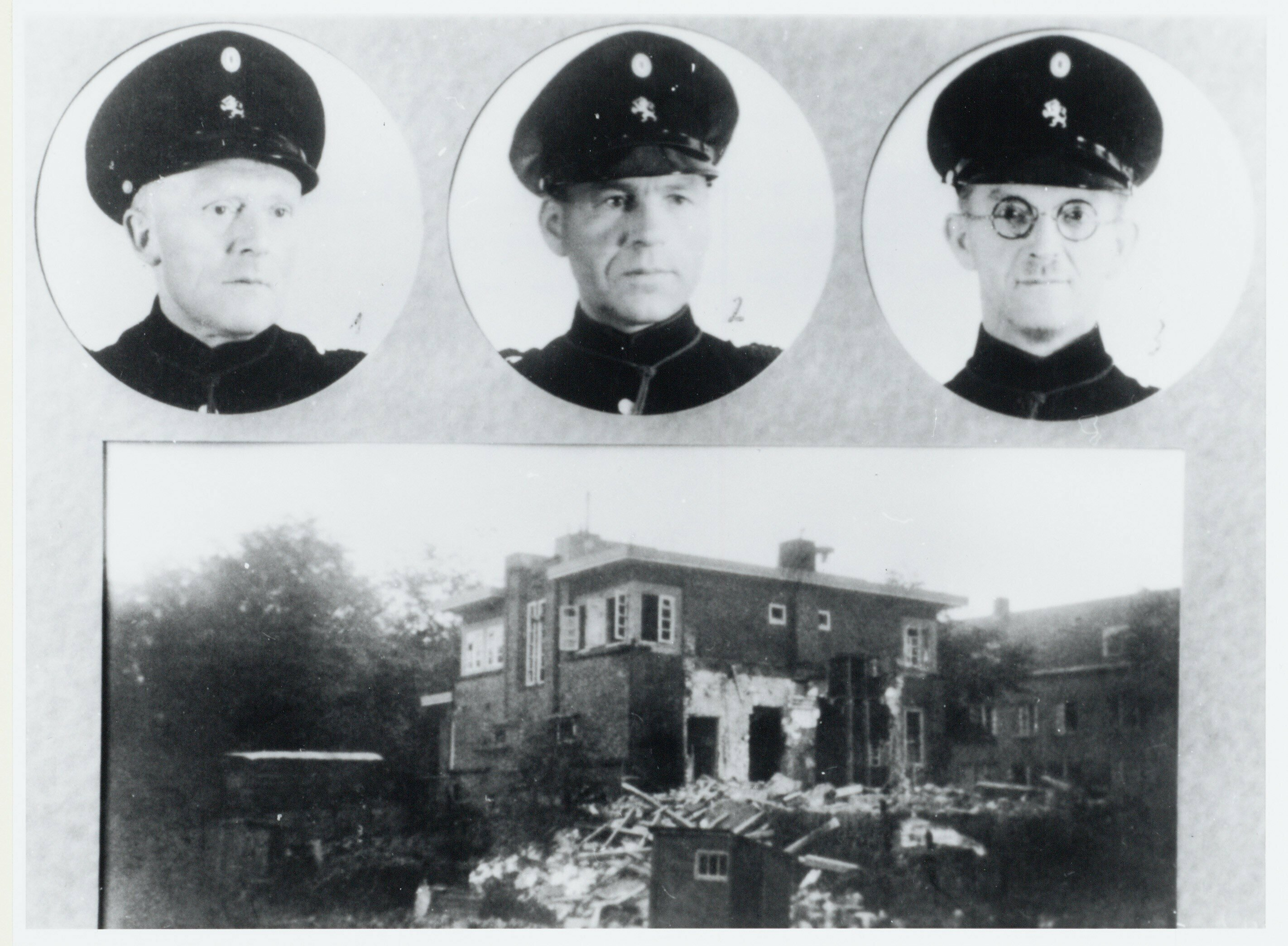
The police station in Amsterdam-Noord that was bombed during the 17 July 1943 raid. On top are three portraits of officers that did not survive the attack: Dirk Tigchelaar, Roelof Luns, and Gerrit Egbert Sempel.

USAAF general Eaker stated to the Dutch government-in-exile on 29 July 1943: “I plead guilty and deeply apologise.” He explained that the attack had wrongly failed to abort the mission after the recall of the leading aircraft, and the bombs were aimed with insufficient accuracy. Eaker promised to improve, and he would reiterate to the USAAF the "strong instructions" for bombing on occupied territory. Furthermore, the involved pilots in question were reprimanded.

Marshal Portal of the British RAF wrote in a letter to Eaker: “I was sorry to hear that the Americans made rather a mess of Amsterdam . . . I hope that it may prevent a repetition of this trouble.” The Brits felt it was important to go to considerable length to meet political requirements, even to the extent of imposing operational restrictions designed to eliminate as far as possible risks to the Dutch civilians, as earlier in the war the Dutch government-in-exile had criticised the level of violence accompanied with the operations of the allied British Forces. The Dutch government was afraid that its occupied citizens might lose confidence in them and the Allied Forces, and would become an easy target for Nazi propaganda. Furthermore, the Allied plans for the liberation of Western Europe slowly began to take shape, and it was crucial for the Allies to retain the support of the civilian population. Eaker replied to the letter of Portal with: “We have much bigger fish to fry.” However, he himself was also not pleased by the actions of his soldiers and did not want another failure like this on his account, stating: “We cannot be party to the slaughter of our sympathisers and allies.”

Damaged bombardment sites in Amsterdam-Noord (July 1943)

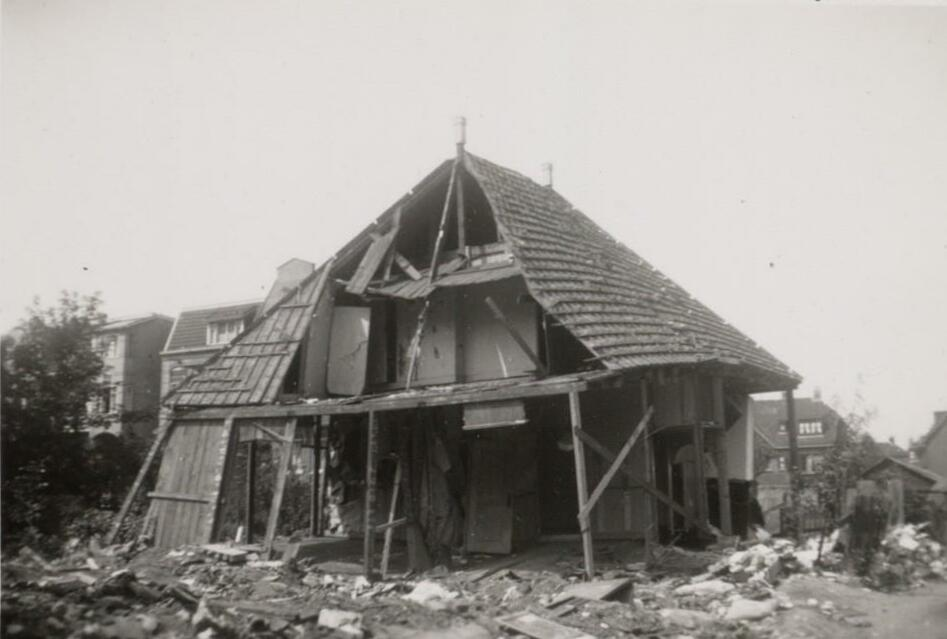
Laanweg

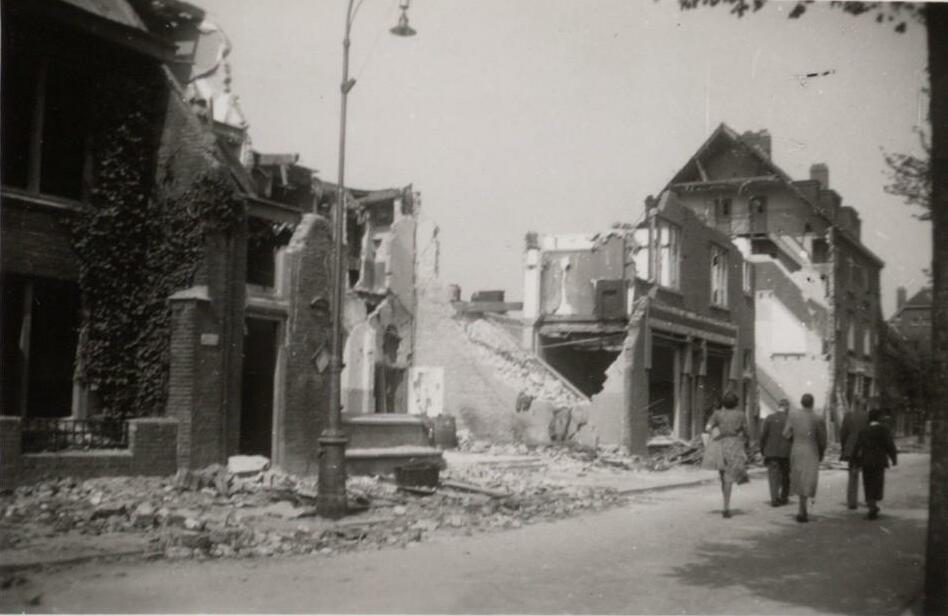
Van der Pekstraat

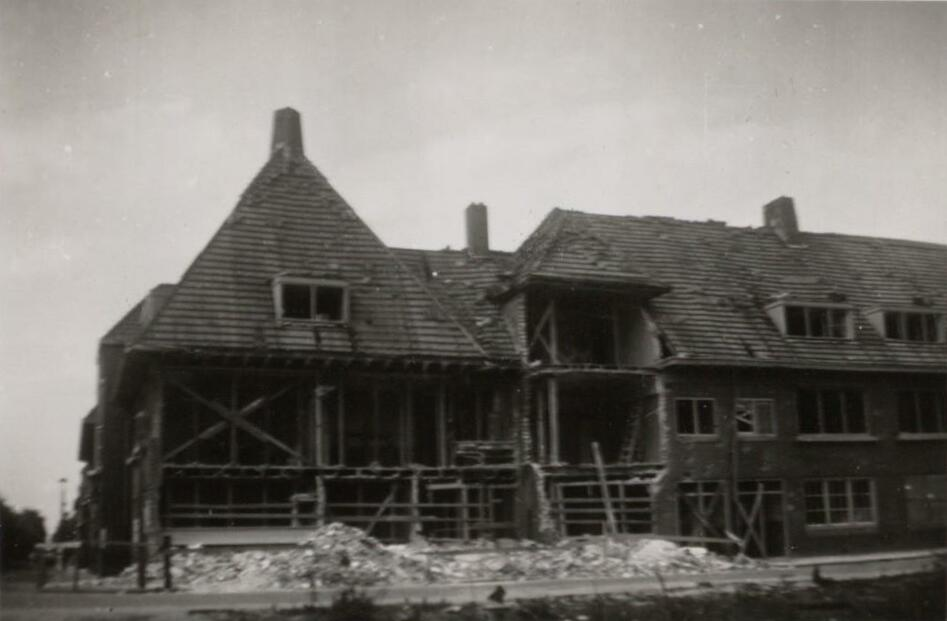
Corner Mosveld and Wingerdweg

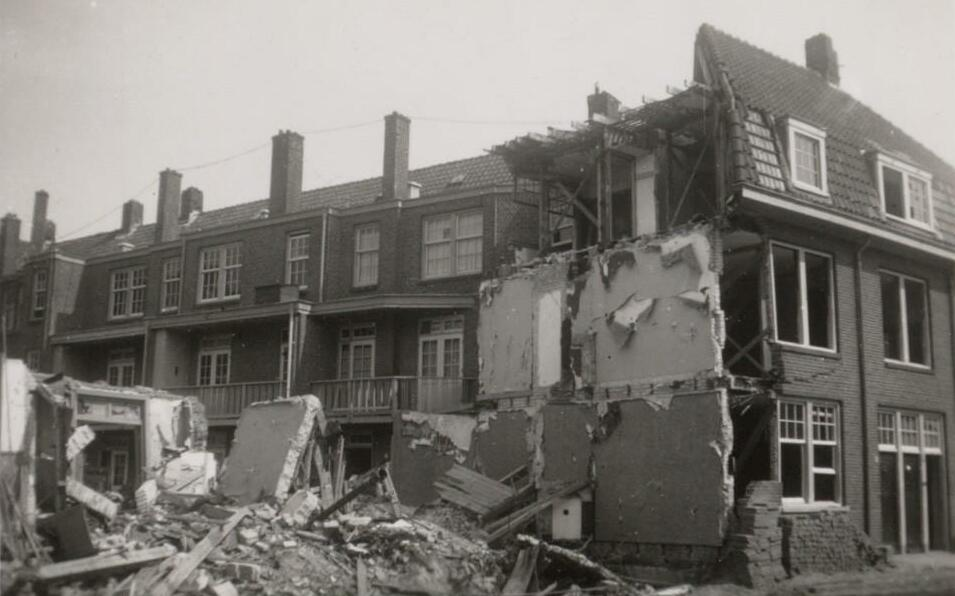
Zilverschoonstraat

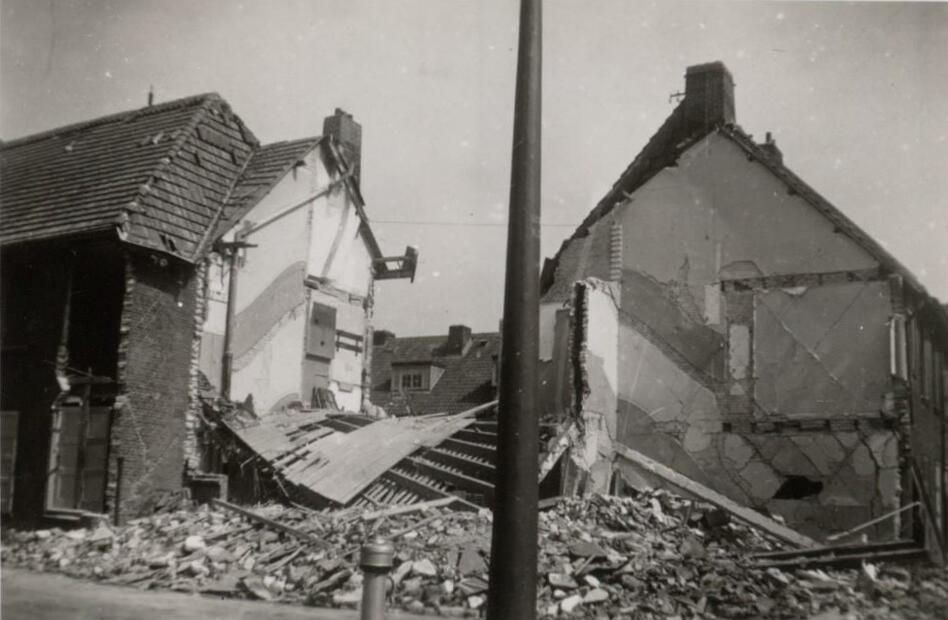
Corner Mosveld and Nigellestraat

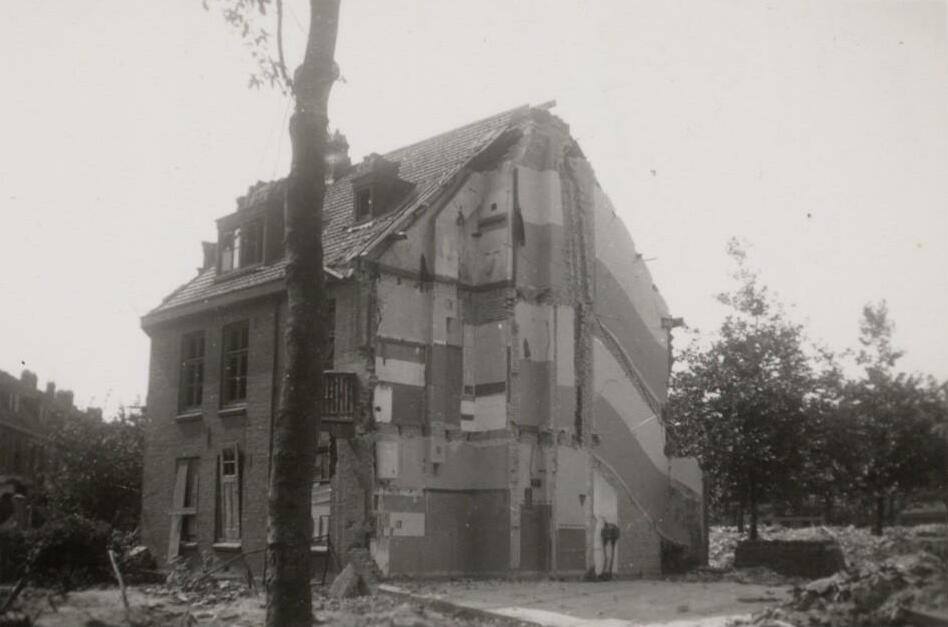
Corner Jac.P. Thijsseplein and Heimansweg

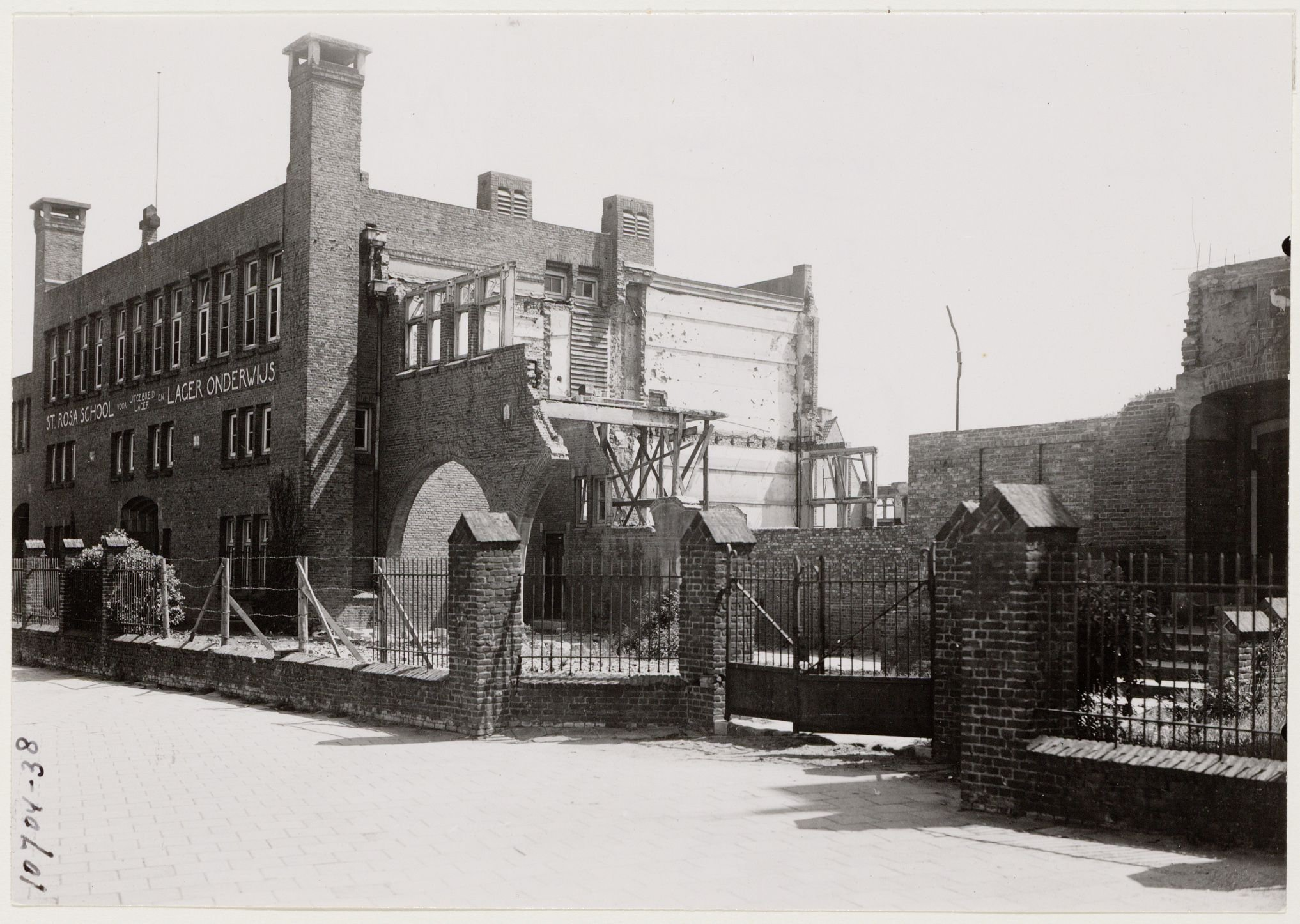
The Sint-Rosa school

== British and French bombings ==
After the failed attempt of the USAAF, the British RAF repeated the mission on 25 July 1943 with 10 B-25 Mitchell medium bombers. This attack was more successful, although the aircraft factory was only hit by seven bombs, but another 71 bombs fell along the Kamperfoelieweg, damaging the St. Stephanus Church and many residential houses. In this second attack 4 more people were killed.

As a result of the 7 successful bombs, Fokker had to distribute the aircraft production over 34 small facilities in and around Amsterdam. For the rest of the war, Fokker could no longer achieve its old production levels due to this British attack.

Unfortunately, this news reached the other Allied forces too late. 3 days later on 28 July 1943, the French FAFL sent another 12 heavy bombers in an attempt to bomb the factory. During this third bombardment, another 48 bombs missed the factory and unintentionally hit the surrounding residential areas again. This third French attack resulted in 17 more casualties.

== Aftermath ==
=== Rebuilding and repair ===
The eventual havoc of the three attacks was enormous. The Hitler Youth came to provide first aid and rescue to the citizens of Amsterdam-Noord, as the Nazi propaganda machine could use the accidental attack on the civilians by the Allies to their advantage. The bombardments caused multiple fires to emerge, spread out through the streets of the residential areas around the factory. Residences that were formerly inhabited by Jews, which were now empty due to the ongoing holocaust, were given to the victims that became homeless after the attack.

The bombarded streets of Amsterdam-Noord would be left in a state of havoc even after the liberation of the Netherlands on 5 May 1945. For years a number of survivors, who could continue living in their —relatively— mildly damaged houses, continued to be surrounded by a chemical bomb smell coming from the rubble in their streets. In the years following the end of the war, the houses in Amsterdam-Noord would finally be rebuilt and repaired by the municipality.

Rebuilding and reparations (1946-1948)

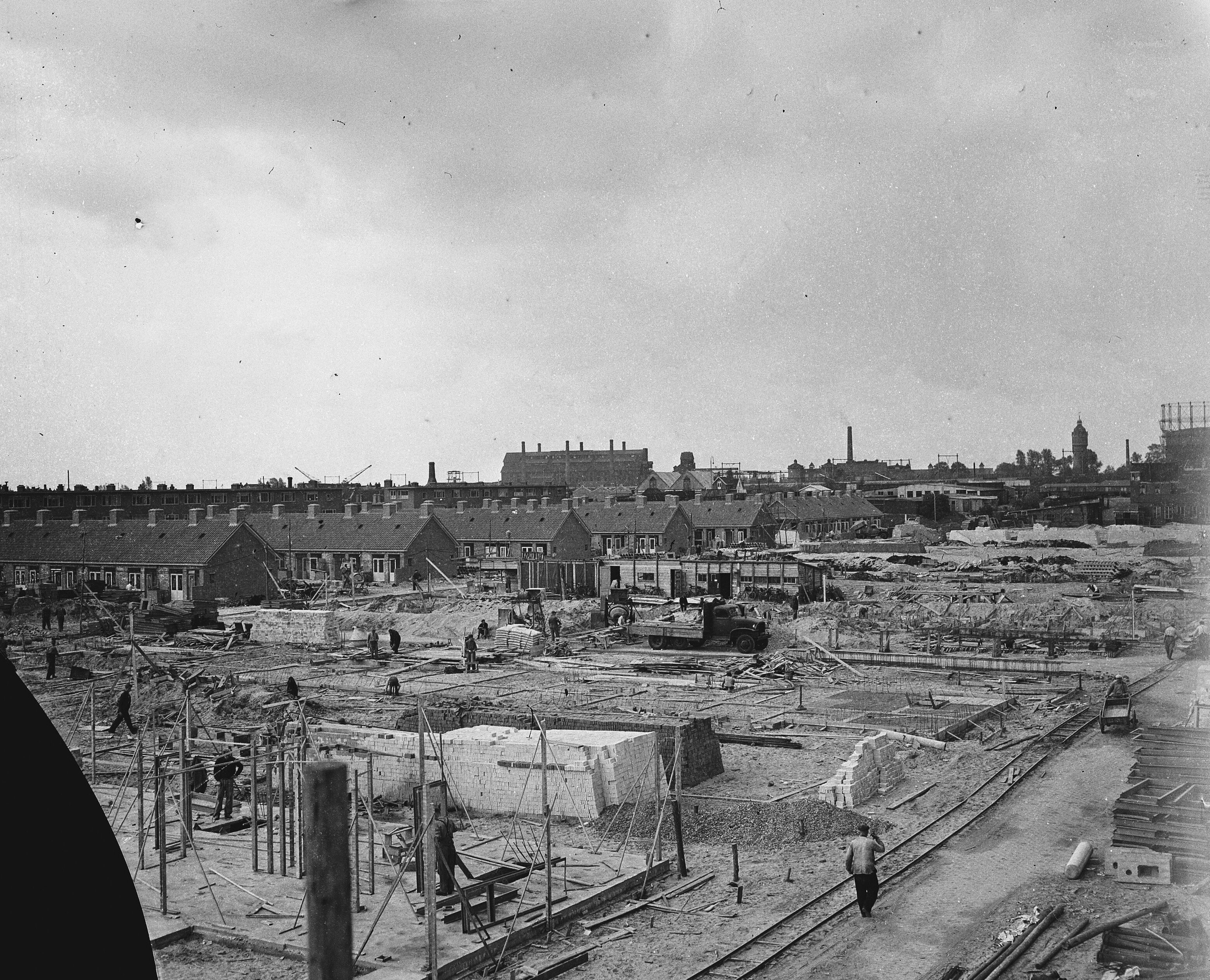
Rebuilding site on 19 May 1947

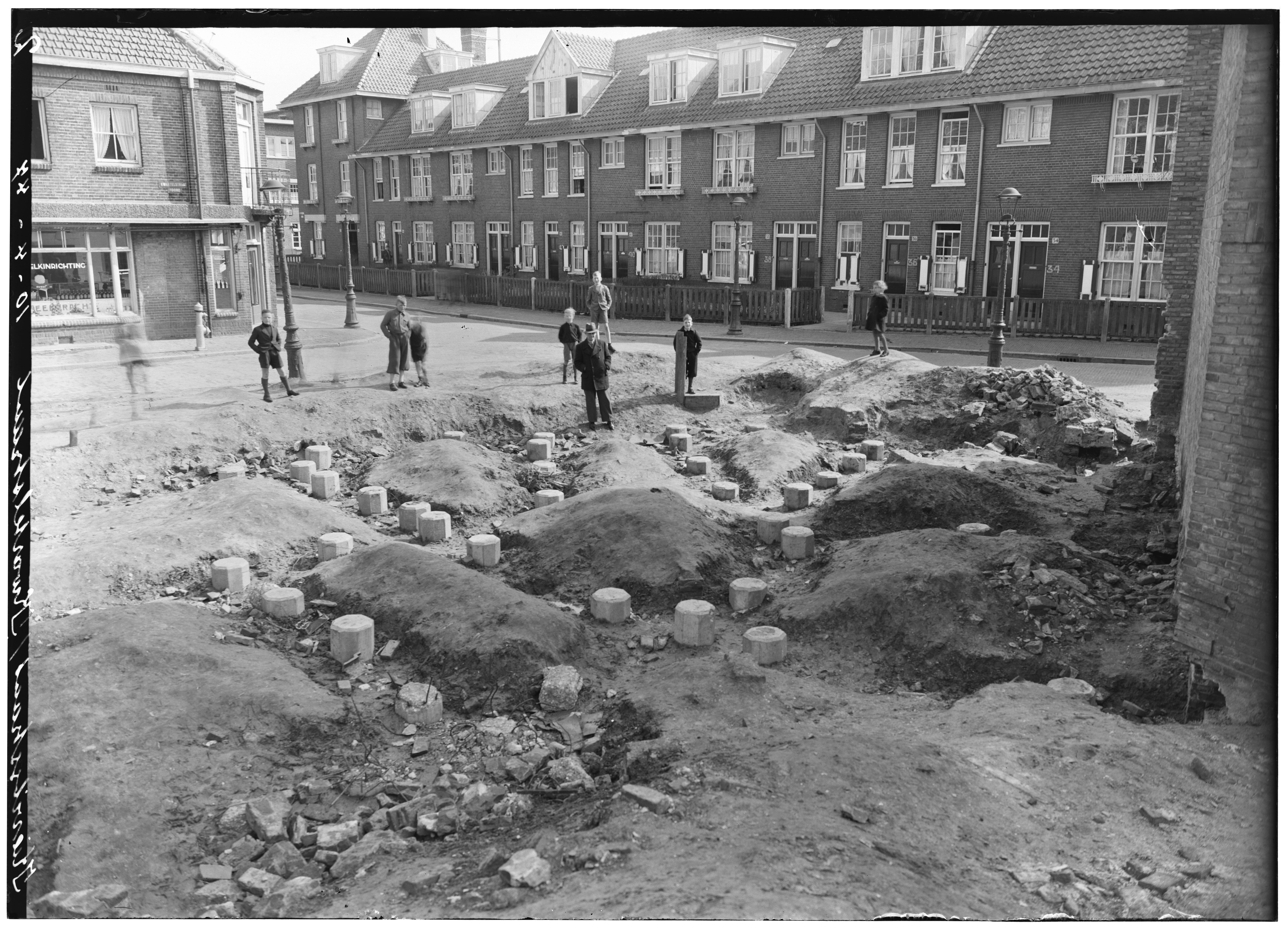
Rebuilding houses after the bombing in 1947 (at Kievitstraat)

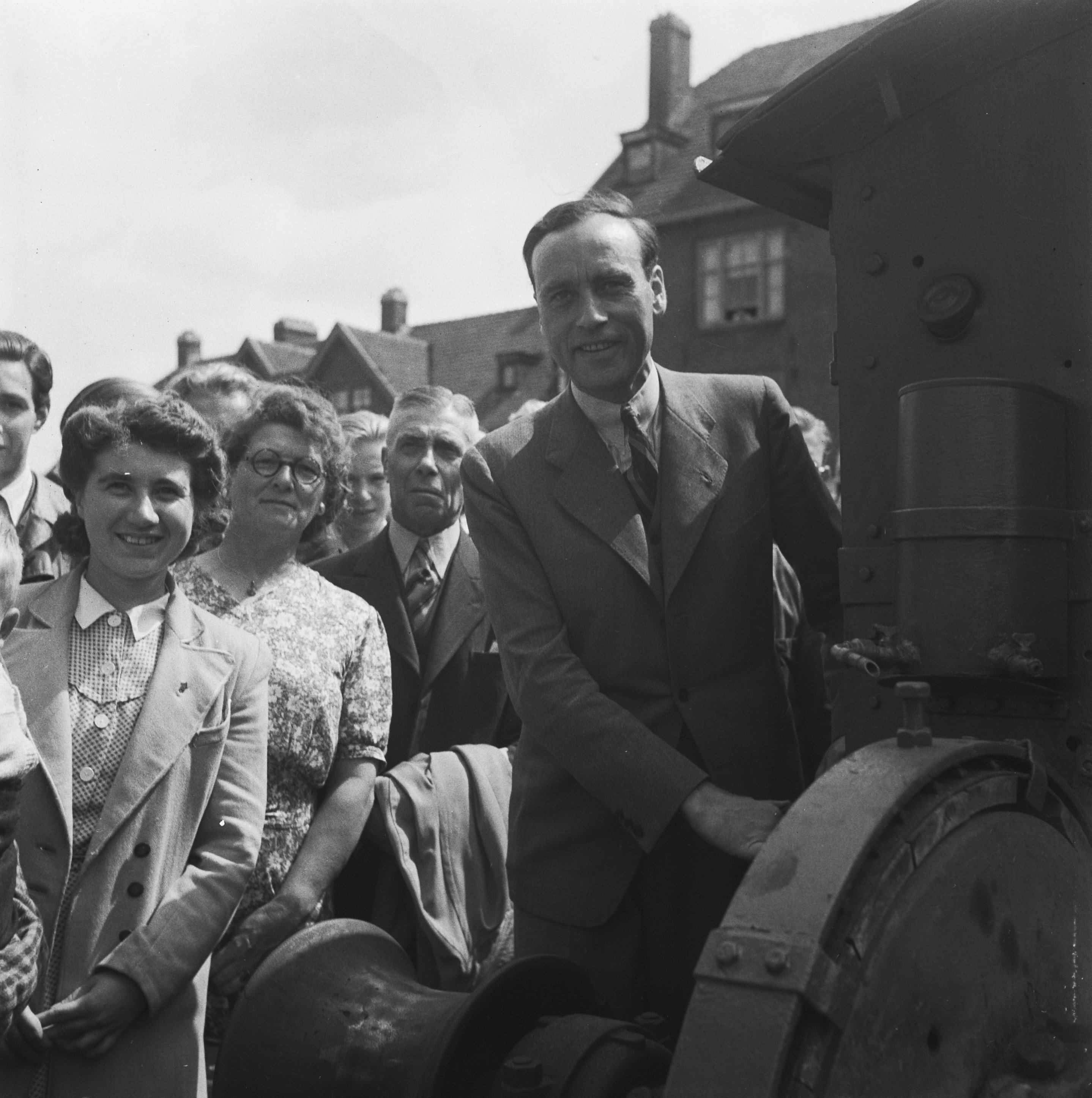
First building pile by Jan Bommer in 1946 (at Van der Pekstraat)

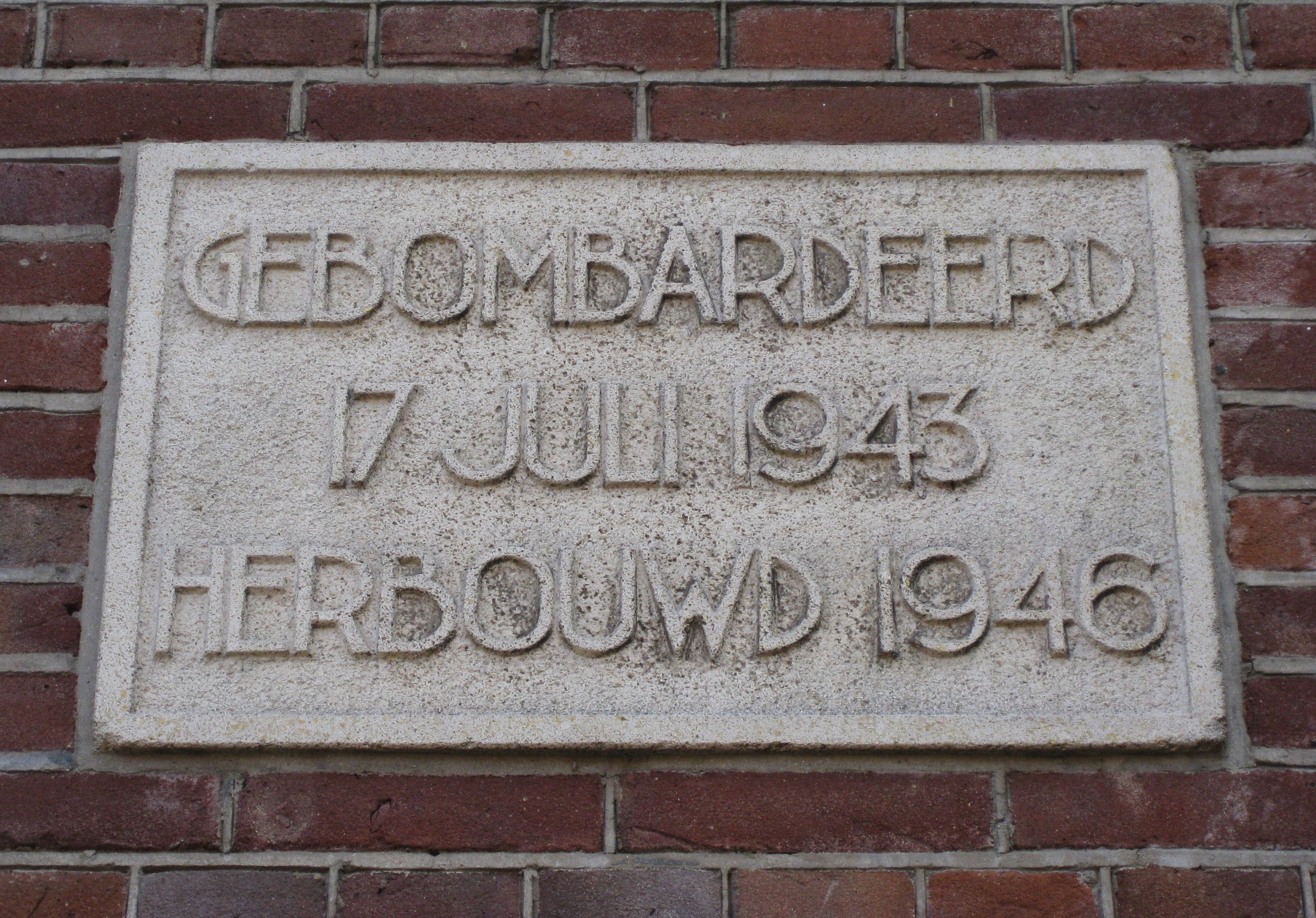
Memorial stone in the rebuilt houses of the Fazantenweg 14-16: “Bombed — 17 July 1943 — Rebuilt 1946”

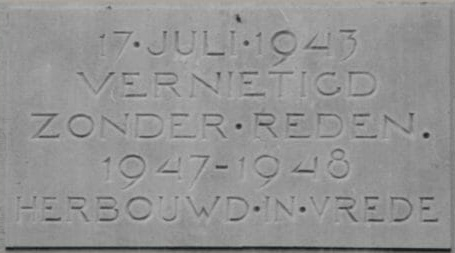
Memorial stone in the rebuilt houses of the Kievitstraat 21: “17 July 1943 — Destroyed without Reason — 1947-1948 — Rebuilt in Peace”

=== Criticism ===
The majority of the in total more than 206 casualties of these three accidental attacks on the residential areas were civilian victims, of which 185 were caused by the first US attack. The technical possibilities of the Norden aiming device were known in the occupied Netherlands. Therefore, the precision of the USAAF bombers was criticised by the Dutch population: “we are not convinced of the practical value of the much-praised excellence of the American aiming devices.” After the failed bombardment, the population in the occupied Netherlands began to distinguish more and more between the attacks of the RAF and the USAAF. The criticism seemed to be mounting, aptly illustrated by a prayer recorded by the MIVD from a source in the Netherlands:

Lord, save us from our protectors, and protect us from our saviors.
Heer, verlos ons van onze beschermers en bescherm ons tegen onze verlossers.

—

=== Taboo ===
As these were Allied attacks, the event and the traumas it caused have always been a sensitive subject and a painful memory for the residents of Amsterdam-Noord. During the war (1940–1945), the Allies would perform about 600 strategic bombings on Dutch soil, resulting in the loss of approximately 10,000 citizens. The accidental civilian attacks by the Allied Forces, like the two failed bombing raids on the Fokker Factory, are in Dutch known as “mistaken bombardments” (vergissingsbombardementen). However, in the Netherlands these events were in reality treated as “unspoken bombings” (verzwegen bombardementen) for a long time. The resulting fear and trauma of the bombardment would be concealed among the survivors, as their attackers were the ones seen as the good guys of the war and not the enemy. Especially at home, these tragic events were never spoken of again.

When you brought up the subject, they would say: “Stop it, it was a mistake by the Allies.” It was a concealed and unspoken subject. You weren’t informed [by adults] about what actually happened during the event. We [the children] talked about it among ourselves, but we didn't really know anything.

— A childhood memory of the situation at home from one of the survivors. At 8-years-old, he was one of the 700 children attending a special children mass in the St. Rita church, which was heavily bombed during the first raid.

=== Acknowledgement ===
The trauma caused by this horrific event is still noticeable in the community of Amsterdam-Noord. Talking about their experiences during the bombing raids would affect the victims, even many years later. It would take generations before the impact and trauma this tragic event had caused was acknowledged by the general public. Nowadays, the Dutch public values education of the younger generations about the people who fought for the freedom of the Netherlands during the Second World War. This resulted in an interest in the stories of the survivors of the bombardments, which can now finally be told after all these years and recorded for future generations.

=== Memorials ===
Throughout Amsterdam-Noord, war monuments and memorials are placed to commemorate the losses and the impact the destruction had on the people of Amsterdam-Noord:

- During the end of the 1940s, Fokker placed the first Fokkermonument in the headquarters of their factory in Amsterdam-Noord, to commemorate the employees that were killed by the bombings or by the Germans out of fear from sabotage actions as the employees were forced to work for them. The names of these fallen employees are engraved in a plaquette on the side of the memorial. On 3 July 1999, this first Fokkermonument was relocated to its current position, the municipality office of Amsterdam-Noord (Stadsdeelkantoor Noord).
- In the facades of the rebuilt houses in the Fazantenweg 14-16 and Kievitstraat 21 are gable stones, which commemorate the rebuilding of the houses (1946–1948) in Amsterdam-Noord after the 17 July 1943 bombardment.
- On 22 September 1951, the former Major of Amsterdam, Arnold Jan d'Ailly, unveiled the memorial statue Phoenix, by designer Hendrik J.J. Dannenburg, at the heavily bombed Mosveld-square. Just like a phoenix, Amsterdam-Noord would rise from its ashes after the bombings of July 1943. The concrete column of the statue reads the text 1940-1945, in memory of all the citizens of Amsterdam-Noord who died during the occupation as a result of acts of war, and specifically the victims of the bombings on Amsterdam-Noord. The people of Amsterdam-Noord collectively paid for the statue themselves after the war. During the construction of the IJtunnel in 1968, the statue was placed in storage. In 2014–2016, the Phoenix was permanently moved from the Mosveld-square to the park on Kamperfoelieweg / Azaleastraat.
- On 17 July 2003, the second Fokkermonument was revealed at De Nieuwe Noorder-cemetery. 93 out of the 206 bodies were buried at this public cemetery of Amsterdam-Noord. The cemetery organises one of the official annual commemorative events in Amsterdam at the Fokkermonument on the national day for the Remembrance of the Dead (4 May).
- In 2018, the municipality of Amsterdam placed 11 memorial manholes of an artwork-series called Friendly Fire. The artwork by Hester Oerlemans is spread out over the bombing zone, and creates awareness by telling the story of the bombardment in pictures.
Memorials and monuments

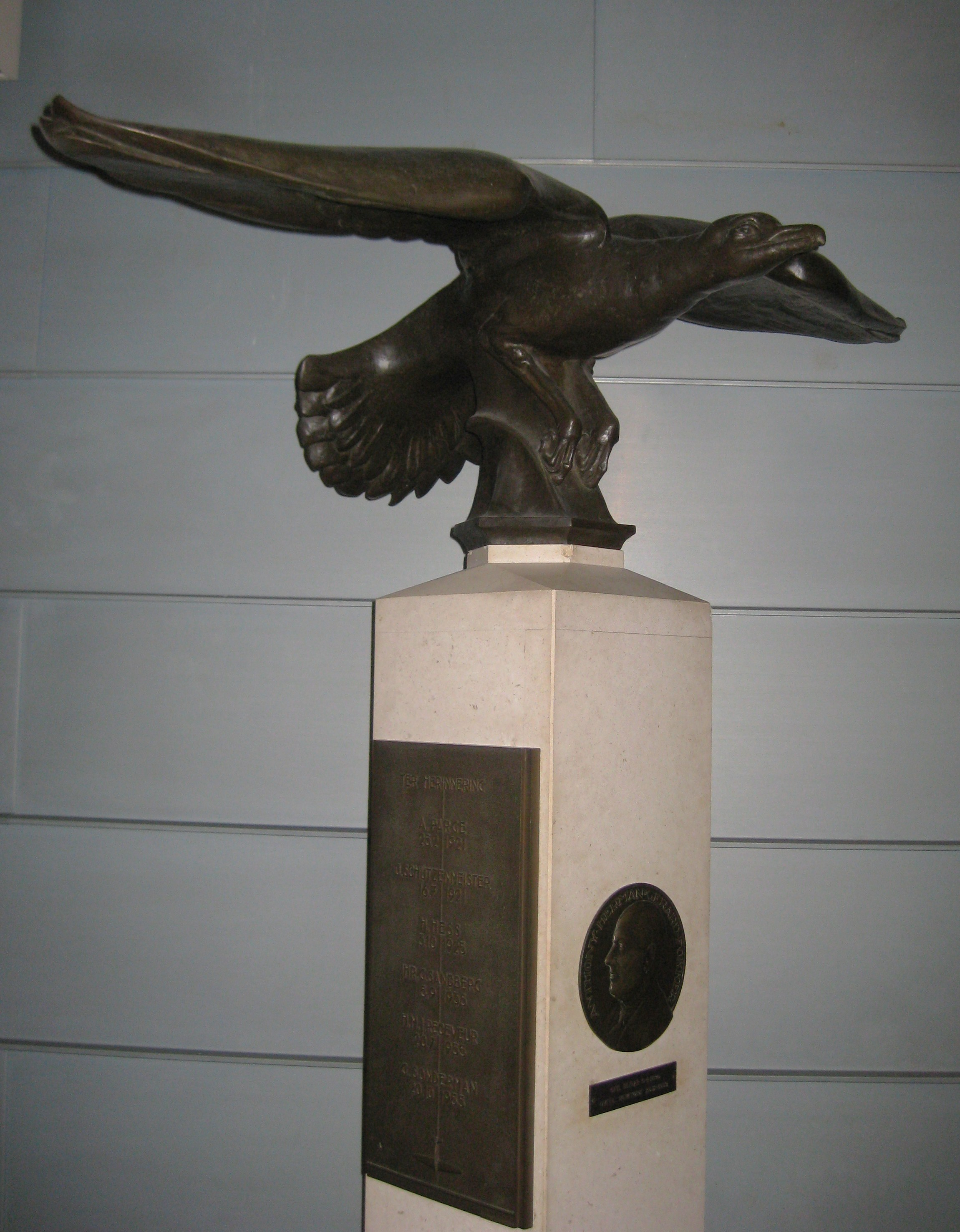
Fokker-monument with the names of the factory killed employees (at Stadsdeelkantoor Noord)

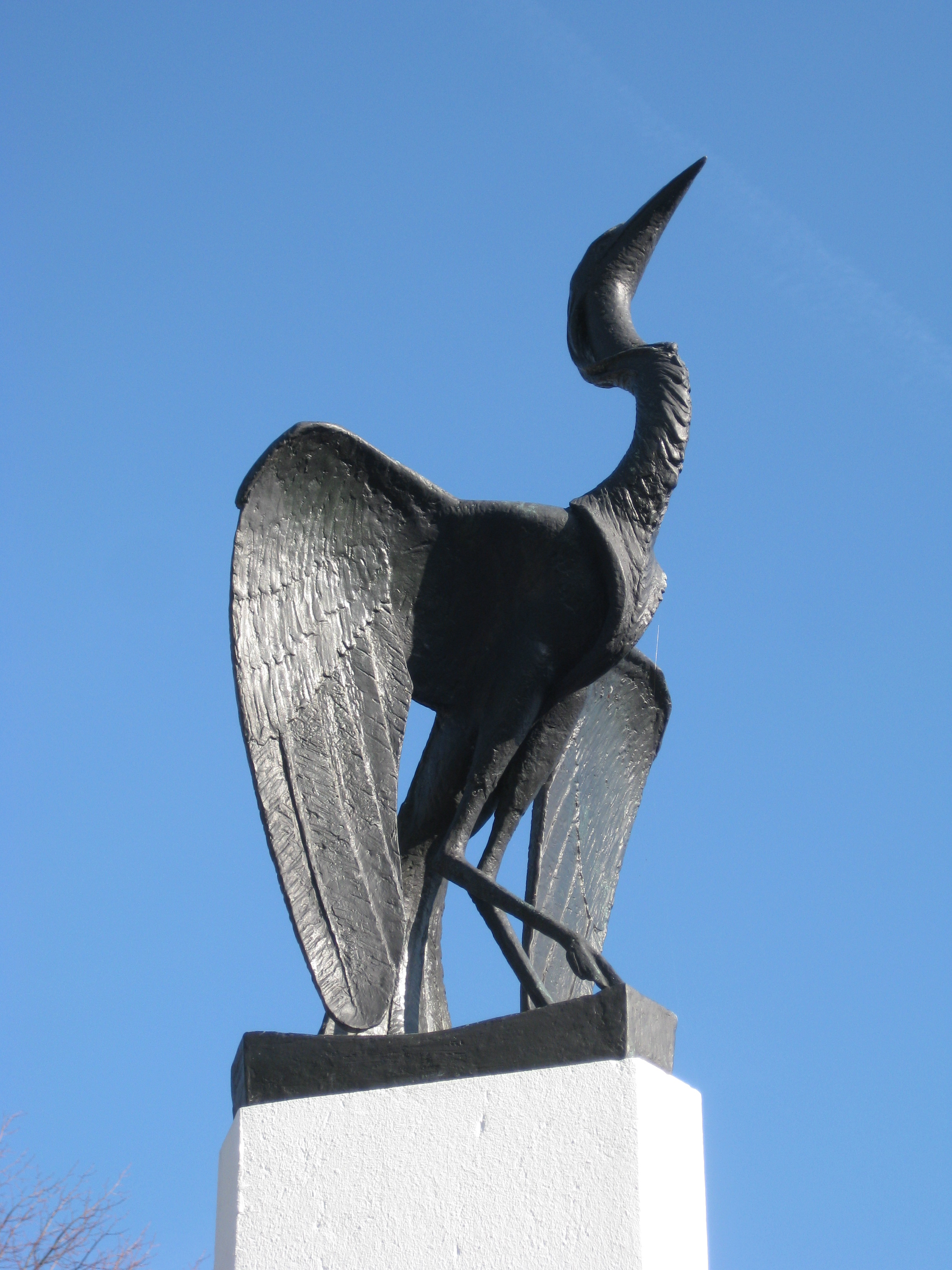
Phoenix memorial (at Mosplein)

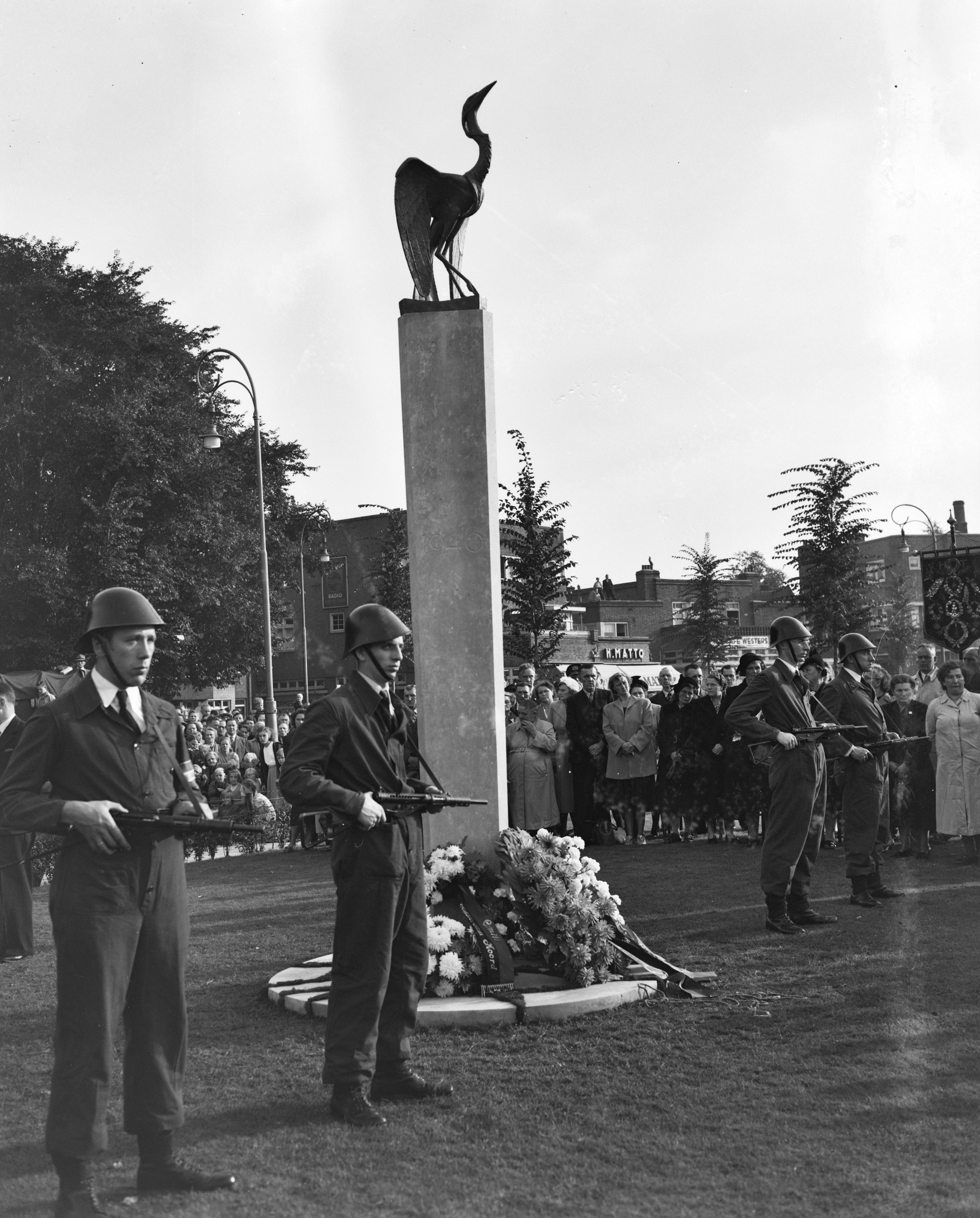
The unveiling of the Phoenix memorial in 1951 (at Mosplein)

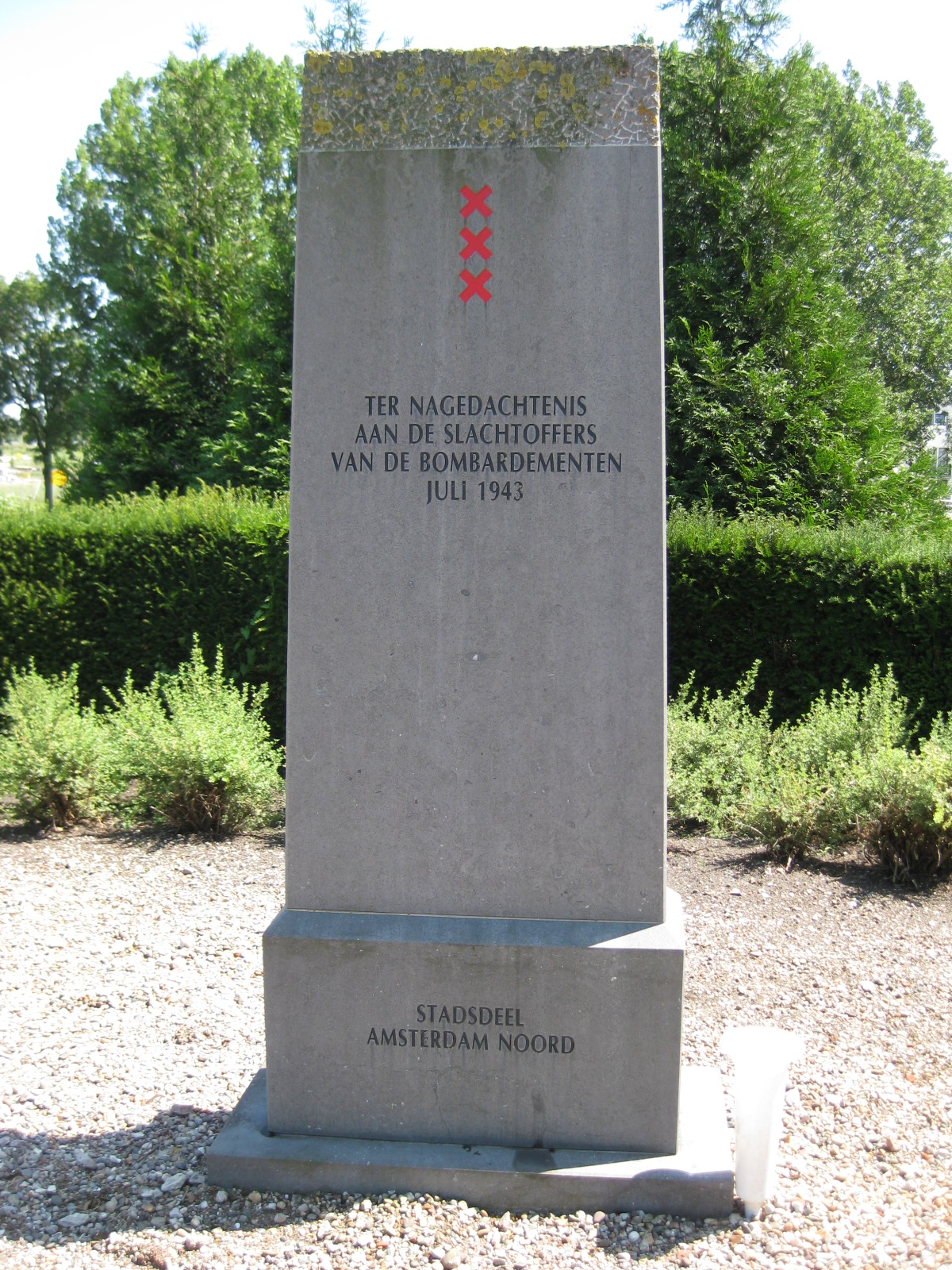
Fokker-monument (at De Nieuwe Noorder cemetery)

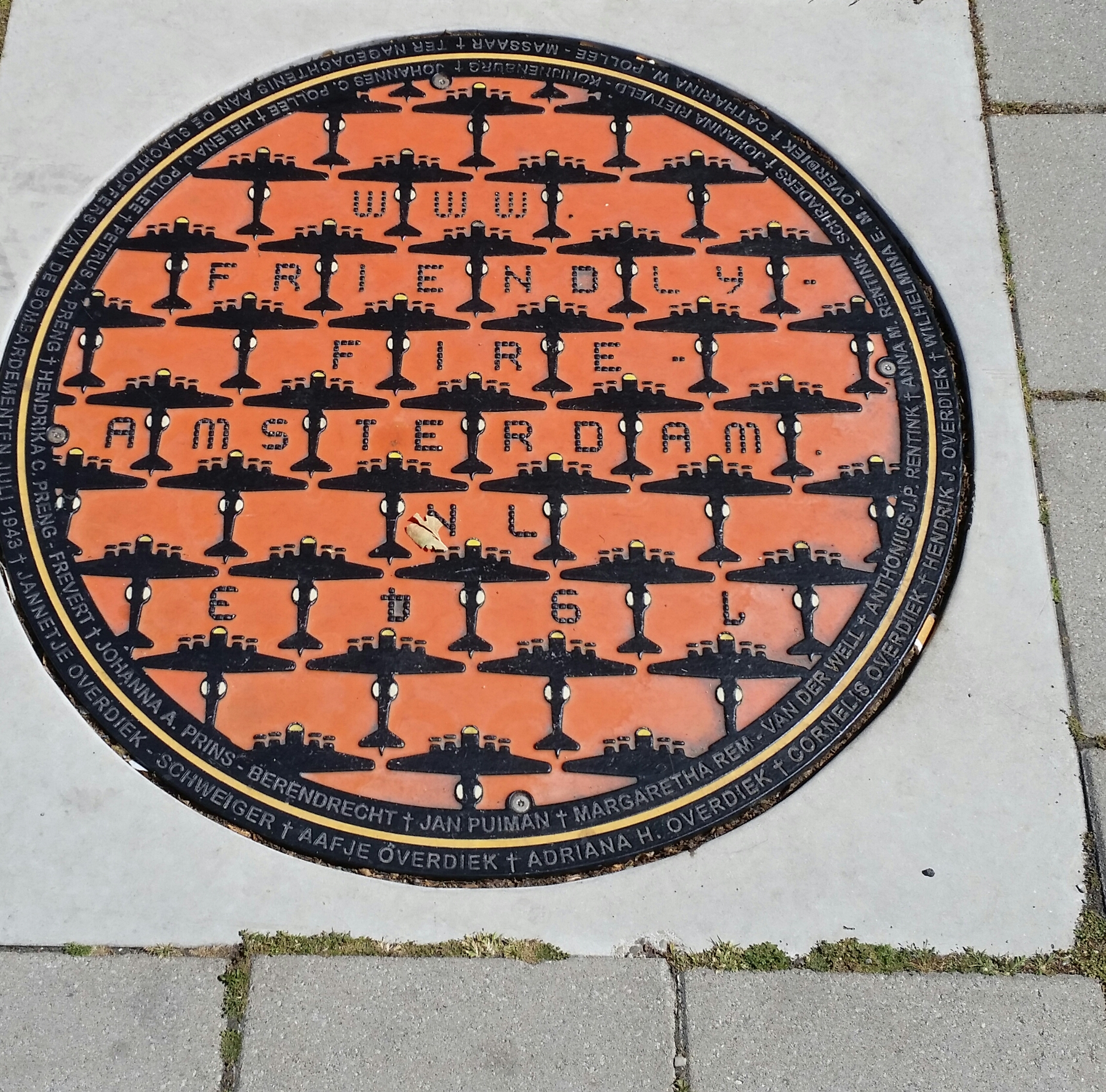
Flying Fortress B-17, artwork in the memorial manhole-series Friendly Fire (at Kraaienplein)

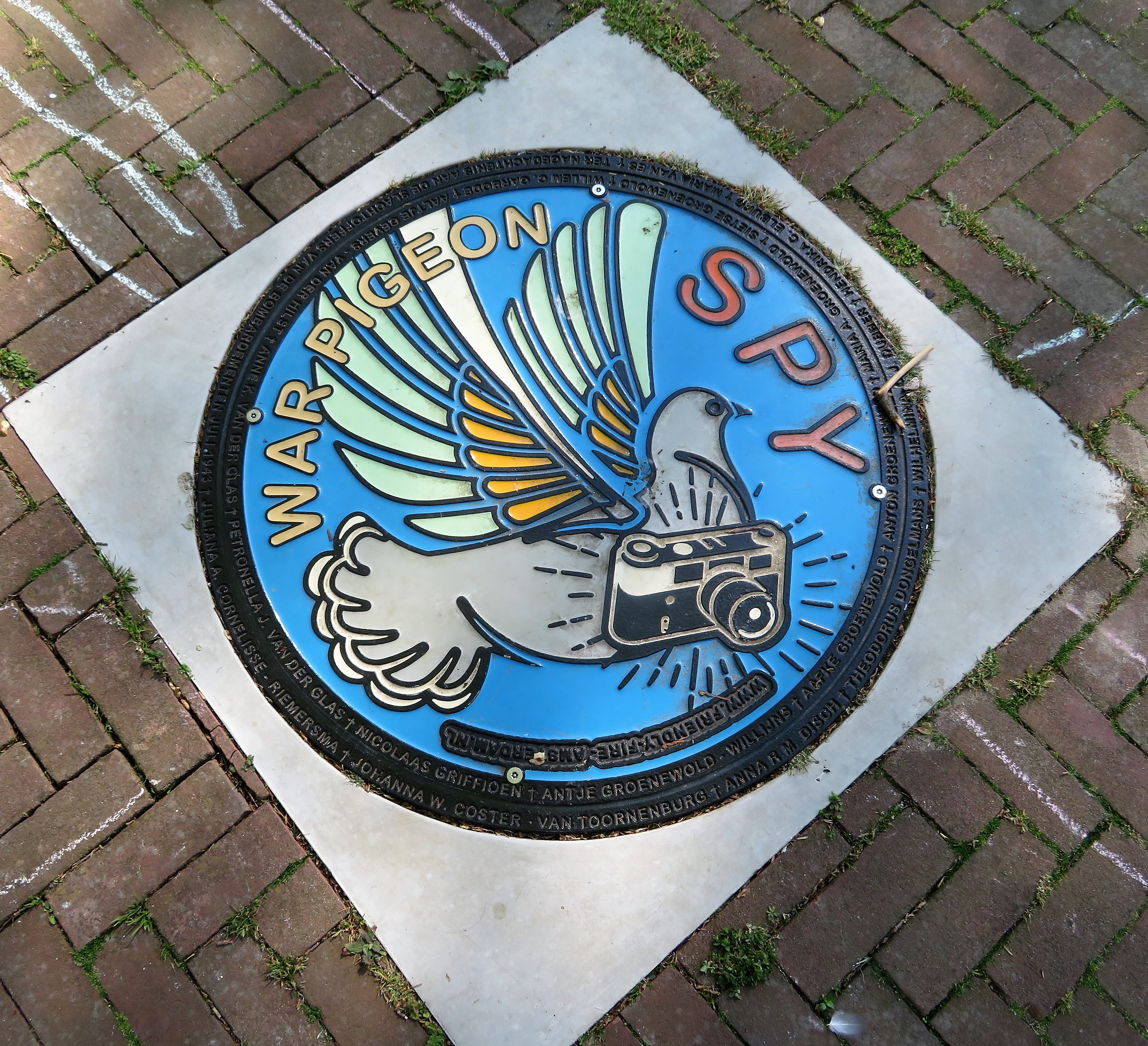
War Pigeon Spy, artwork in the memorial manhole-series Friendly Fire (at Kraaienplein)

== See also ==
- Allied bombing of Rotterdam in World War II
- Bombing of the Bezuidenhout
- Bombing of Nijmegen
- Bombing of Amsterdam
