= Bospolder-Tussendijken =

Neighborhood of Rotterdam, Netherlands

Coordinates: 51°54′31″N 4°26′30″E

- Neighborhood of Rotterdam
- Interactive map of Bospolder-Tussendijken
- Country: Netherlands
- Province: South Holland
- COROP: Rotterdam
- Borough: Delfshaven
- Time zone: UTC+1 (CET)

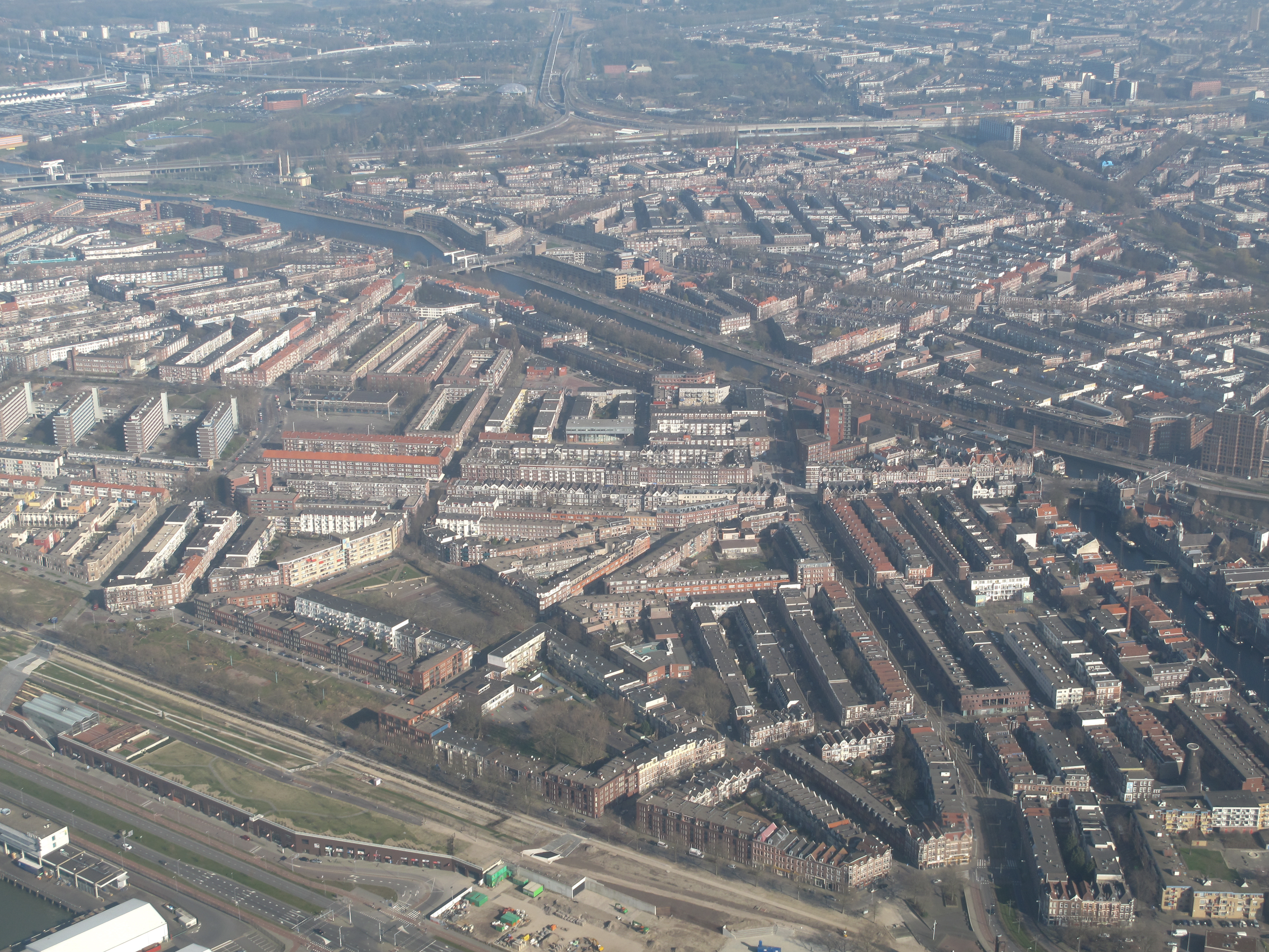
Bospolder-Tussendijken from the sky

Bospolder-Tussendijken is a neighborhood of Rotterdam, Netherlands.
