= Weena (Rotterdam) =

Street in Rotterdam, the Netherlands

Coordinates: 51.9230°N 4.4704°E

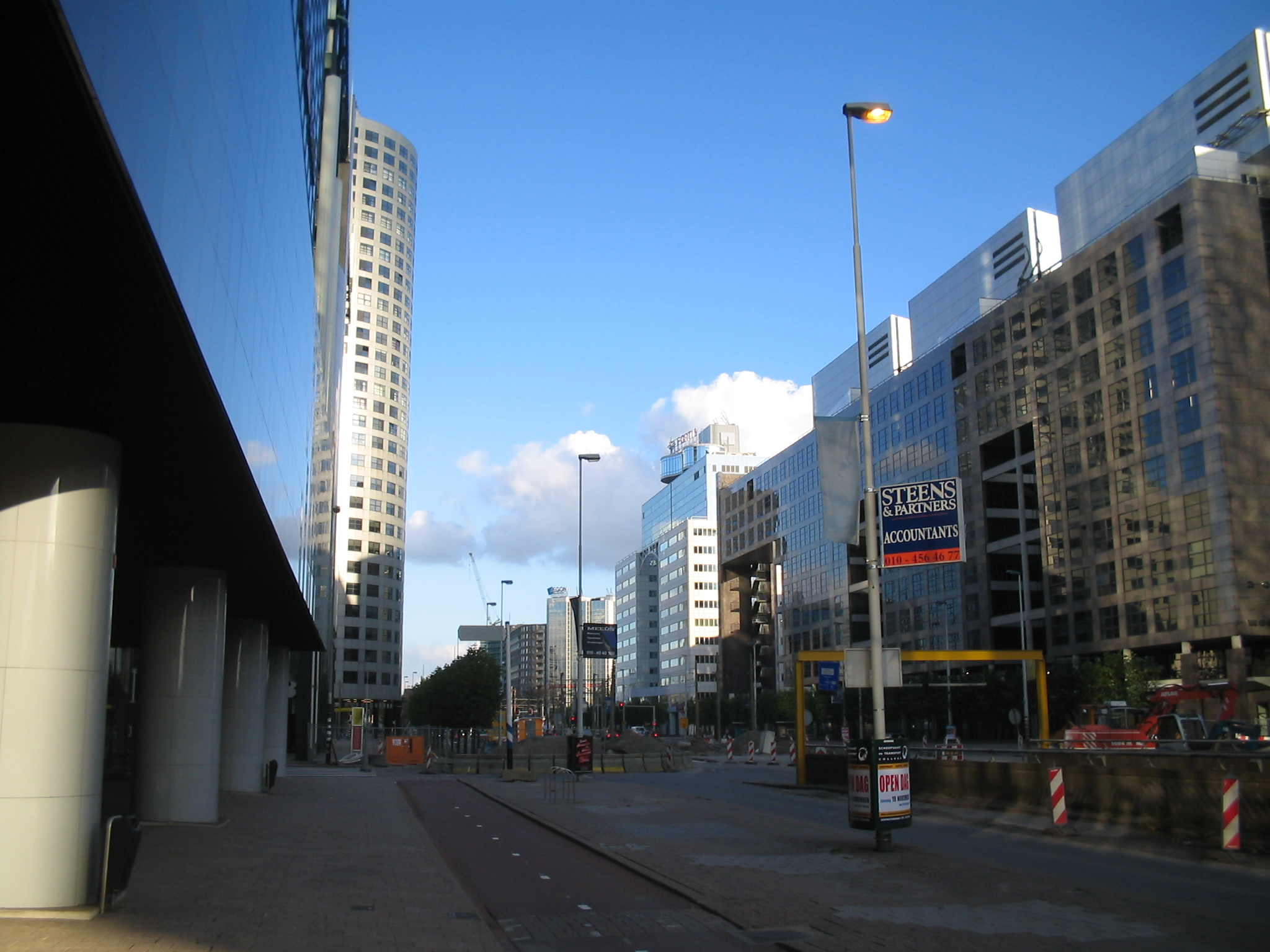
Weena seen to the east from the Stationsplein

Weena is a street with many highrises in the center of Rotterdam, Netherlands. It defines the Rotterdam skyline. The street of about 1 kilometer length leads east-west from Hofplein to Beukelsdijk.

== History ==
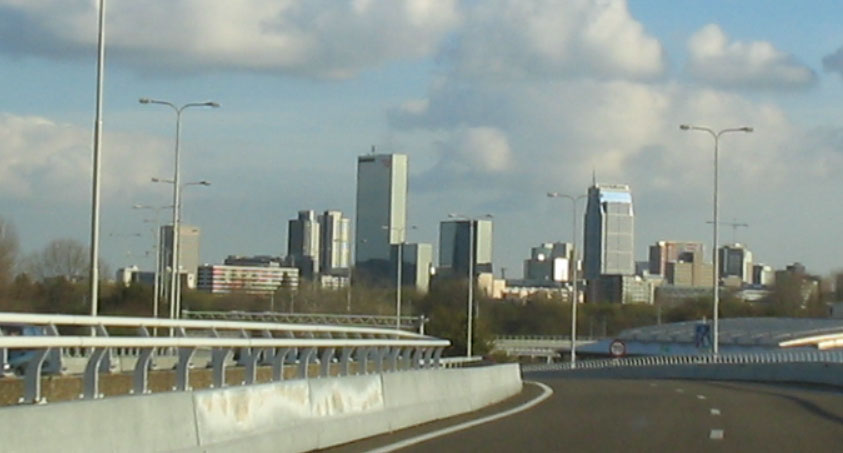
The Skyline of Rotterdam, looking towards Weena

Weena was named after the Hof van Wena, a 12th-century keep which stood at the site of the former Hofplein Station. The building was destroyed in 1426. The name remained in use to designate the area just outside Hofpoort, the northern city gate.

In 1854 the names Weenastraat and Weenaplein were given to an existing street and square in the area, following city architect Willem Nicolaas Rose´s design. After the bombing of Rotterdam in 1940 the area was demolished.

In 1949 the city government gave the name Weena to a street through the still wide open terrain. The construction of the Groothandelsgebouw (1953), Rotterdam Centraal Station (1957) and the Hilton Rotterdam (1963) transformed Weena into an icon of the postwar reconstruction of the city. Major new developments followed in the 1990s and in the early 21st century.

In 2007 Weena was named the most air-polluted street in the Netherlands.

== Places of interest ==
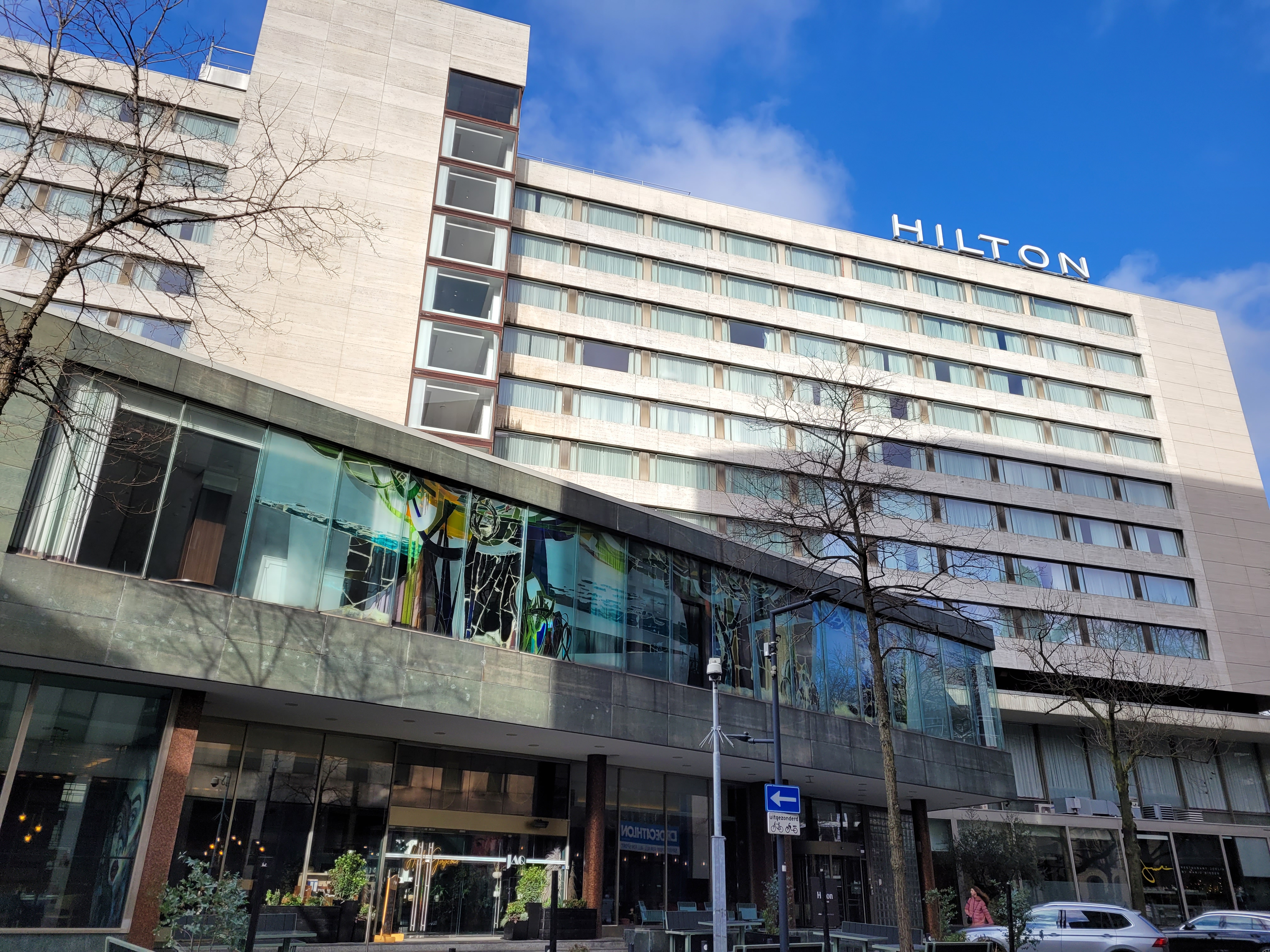
Hilton Rotterdam

- Rotterdam Centraal station is located on Stationsplein, the plaza which is accessible from Weena.
- Groothandelsgebouw, a National Monument on the corner of Weena and Stationsplein. One of the first major buildings to spur economic development after the German bombing of Rotterdam.
- Weenacenter, a 104-meter high residential tower built in 1992
- Milleniumtoren, a 131-meter high office tower with hotel.
- Delftse Poort, a twin-tower skyscraper that was the tallest building in the Netherlands between 1991 and 2005.
- Hilton Rotterdam on Weena 10, declared National Monument in 2016, by architect Hugh Maaskant
- Weenatunnel, an underground passage built in 1951
- Seated woman, Reclining figure and Standing figure, three sculptures by Willem de Kooning
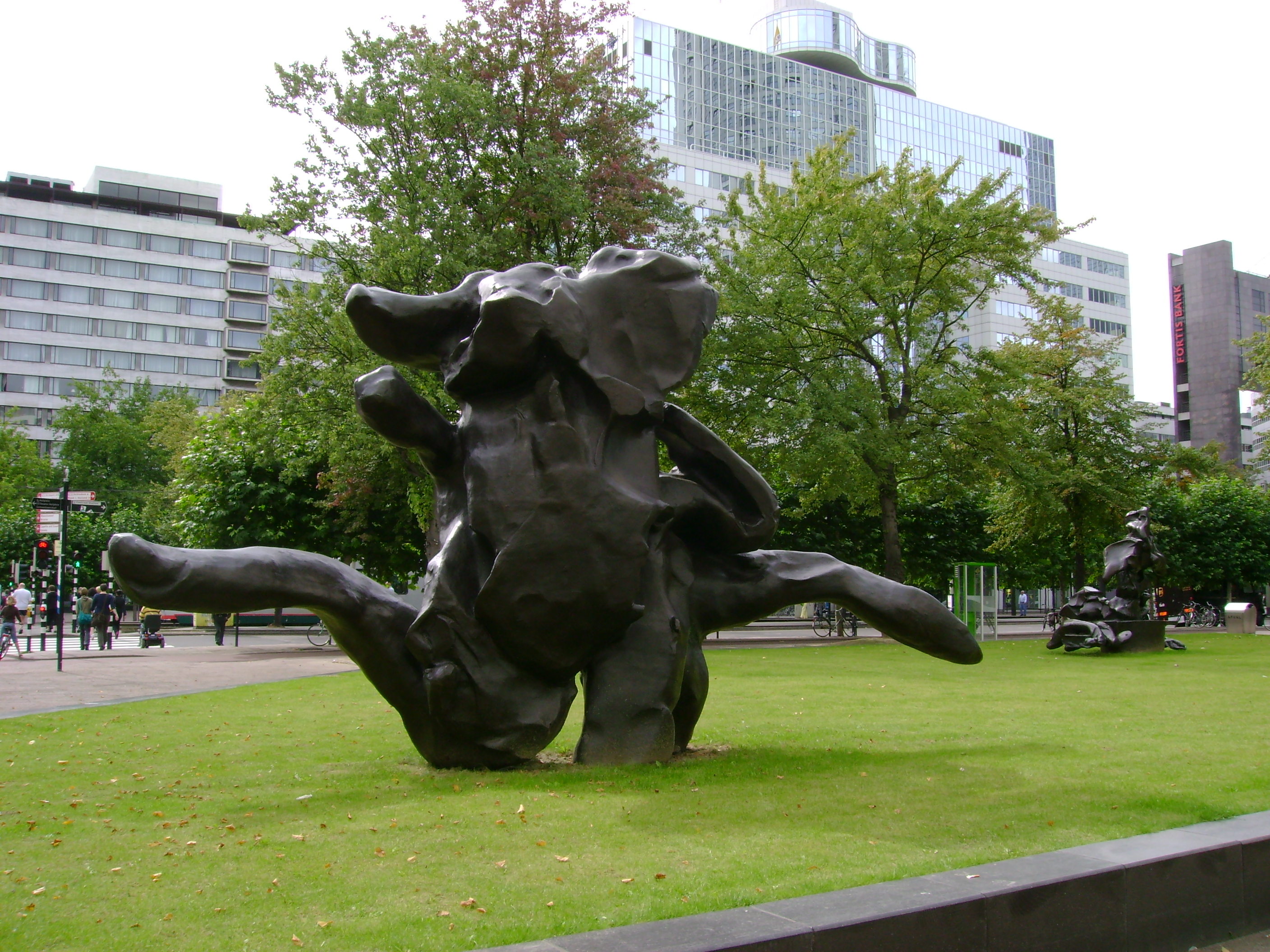
  Seated woman and Standing figure by Willem de Kooning
