= Scheveningen Pier =

Pleasure pier in the Dutch resort town of Scheveningen

Coordinates: 52°07′02″N 4°16′48″E

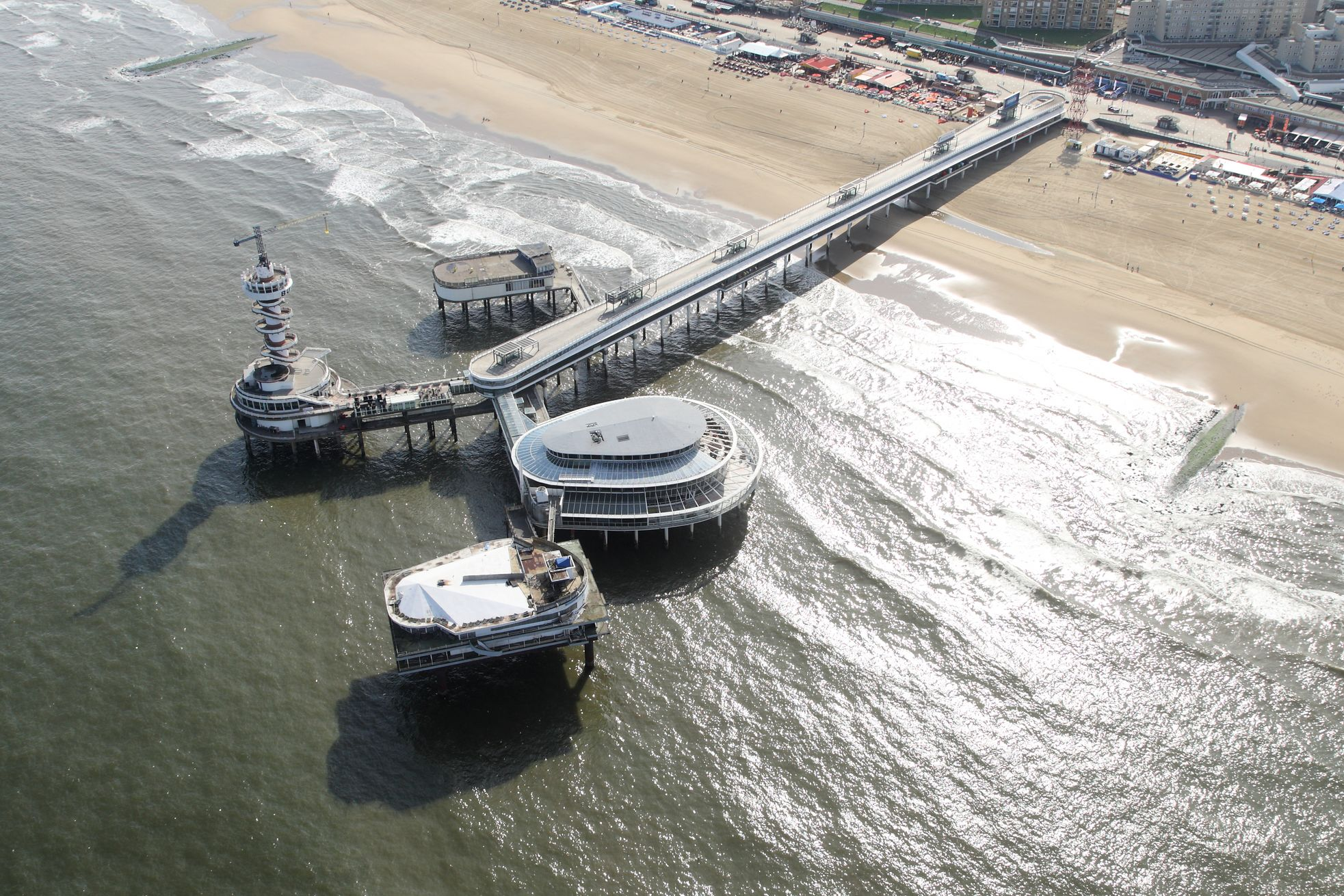
- Pier, aerial view
- Type: Pleasure pier

Characteristics
- Total length: 382 metres (1,253 ft) (height 45 m (148 feet)

History
- Designer: Hugh Maaskant, Dick Apon
- Opening date: 1901 (Wandelhoofd Wilhelmina), 1961 (current form)

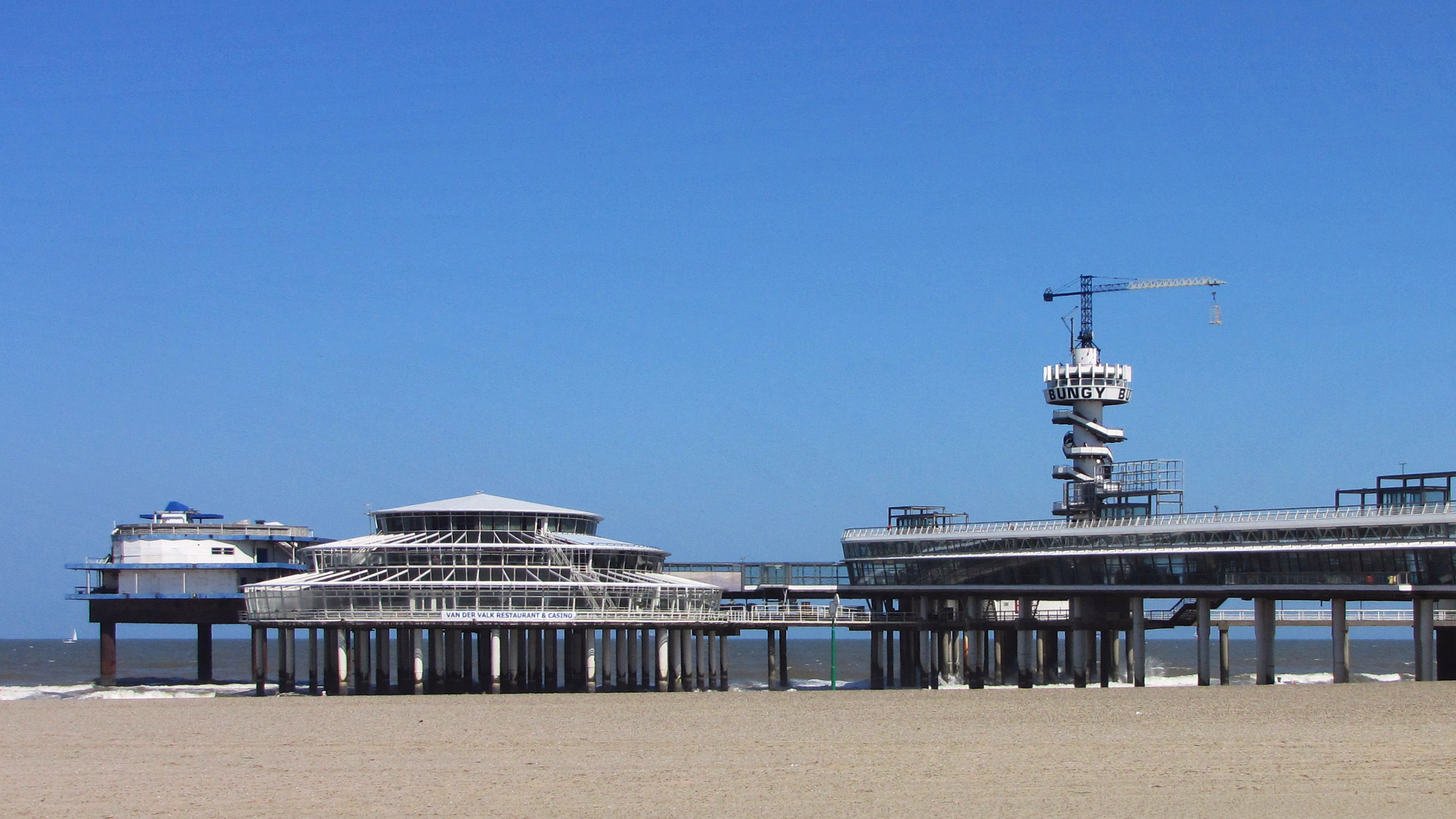
Scheveningen Pier (Photogr. 2011)

The Scheveningen Pier is a pleasure pier in the Dutch resort town of Scheveningen near The Hague. Opened in 1961, the current pier is the second in the town, the first being lost just after, and as a result of, the Second World War.

== History ==
=== Wandelhoofd Koningin Wilhelmina ===
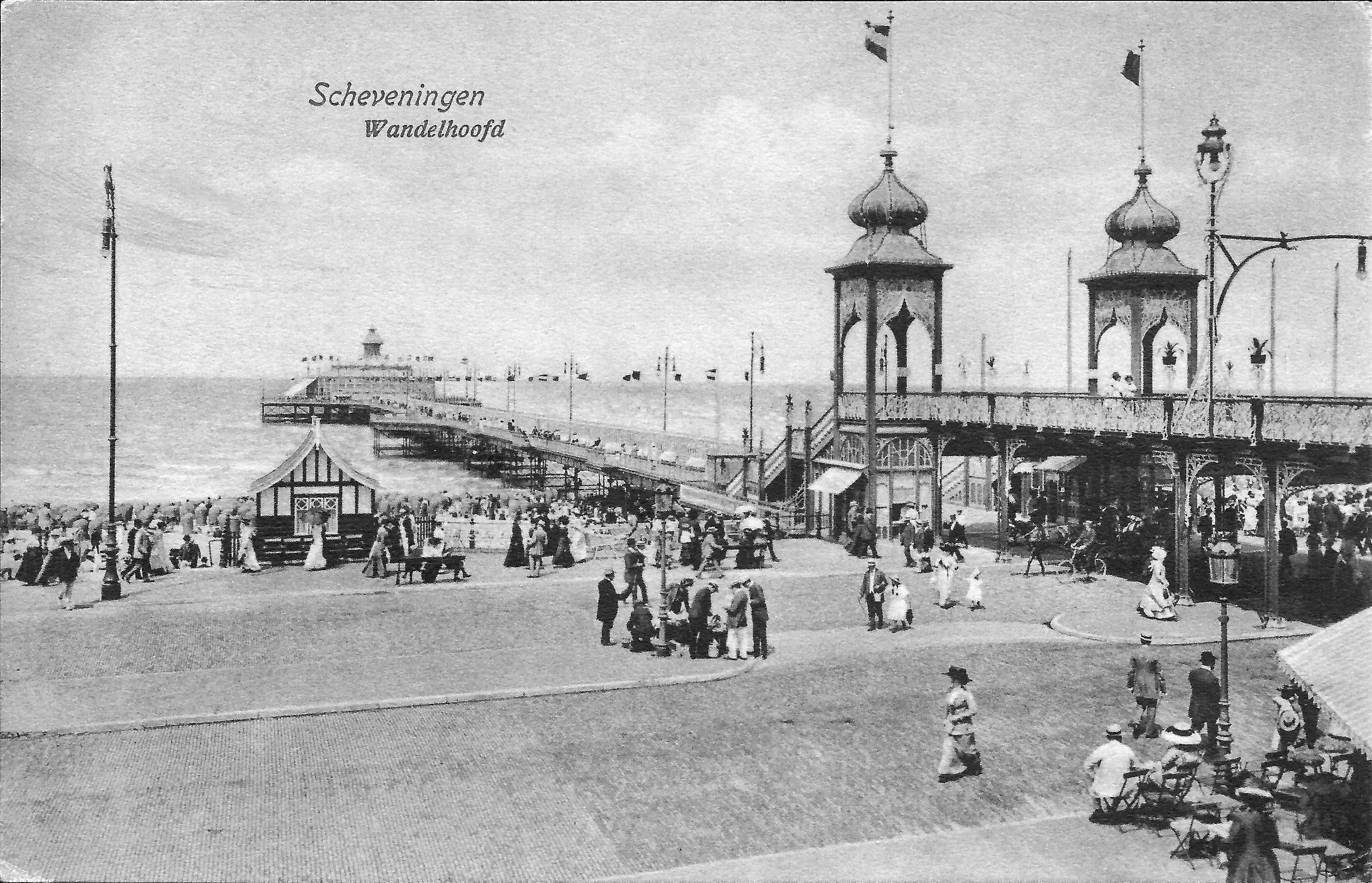
First pier, Wandelhoofd Wilhelmina

The first pier of Scheveningen, named Wandelhoofd Koningin Wilhelmina (Stroll Main Queen Wilhelmina) opened on 6 May 1901 and was designed by the Dutch architect Wilhelmus Bernardus van Liefland and W. Wyhowski. The wooden structure was built on a steel foundation directly in front of the Kurhaus hotel. During the Second World War Scheveningen was part of the Atlantikwall with the Germans using the pavilion as a storage facility as well as placing arms ammunition on the pier. To complicate an invasion by the Allies, the 30 meter promenade was removed and fitted with a suspension bridge. On March 26, 1943 the pavilion burned out completely. After the fire, the Germans demolished the pier by removing the wooden upper structure from its foundation, most likely due to fears the pier could be used by the Allied forces in an amphibious assault.

=== Current pier ===
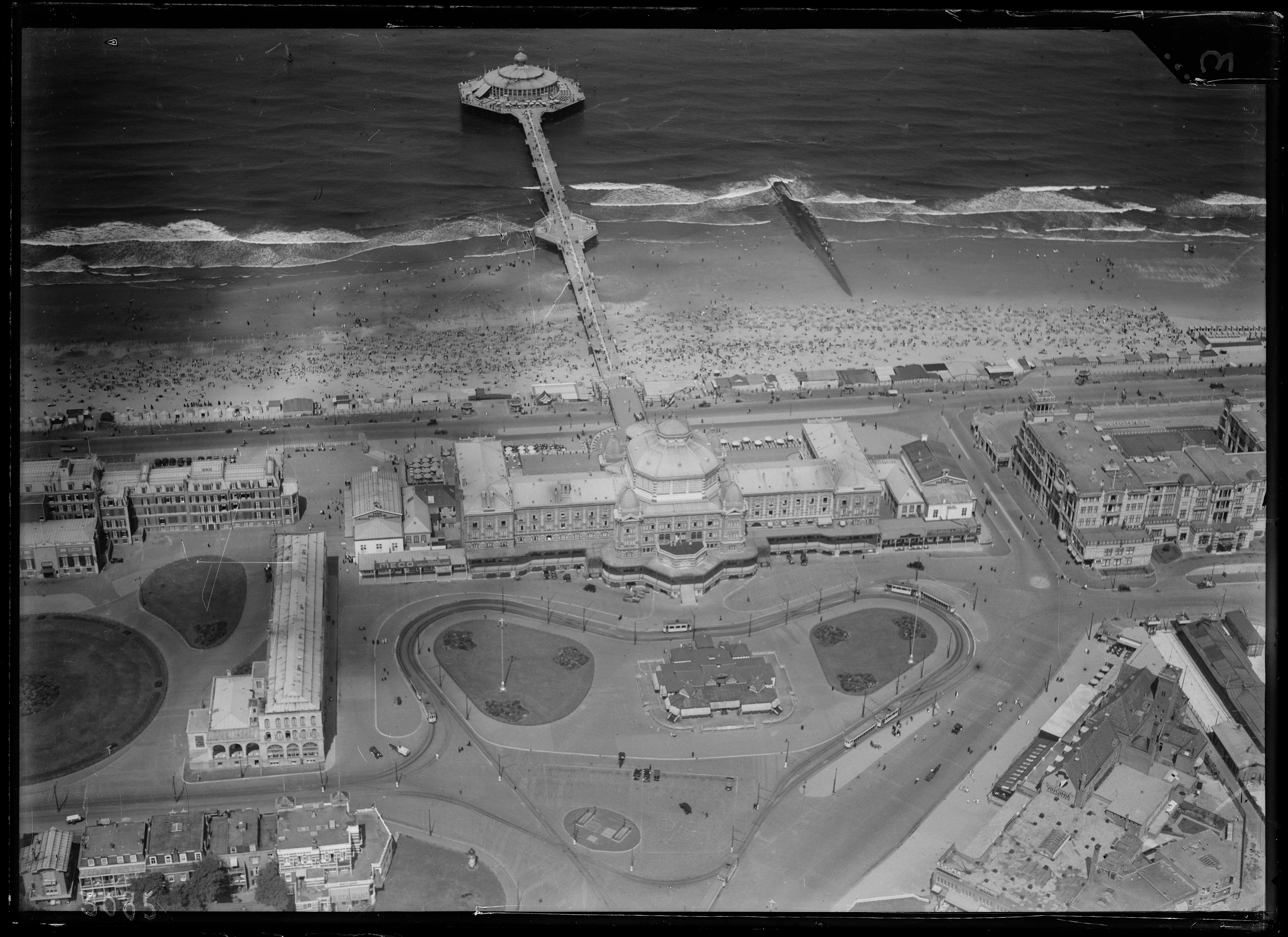
Aerial view

On 17 September 1959 the current structure, designed by Dutch architects Hugh Maaskant and Dick Apon from Rotterdam, was opened by the then mayor of The Hague, Hans Kolfschoten. Its unusual construction boasts two levels for the main pier, the lower deck a closed-in section, the upper open to the elements, and four terminal sections called 'islands', each originally with a separate focus. Its total length is 382 meters.

After a period of decay the pier was purchased in 1991 by the Van der Valk group for one Dutch guilder. The company invested about 20 million euros in the pier, refurbishing the main span and one island, constructing a restaurant and casino. Following a fire in 2011 a new period of decay began and the pier was declared bankrupt in early 2013. The whole structure was closed in October 2013 by the town management, because the structure was no longer safe.

The project developer Kondor Wessels Groep en Danzep BV bought the pier in October 2014 and planned to introduce various new features. On 19 July 2015, the upper deck of the pier was partly reopened, though safety concerns limited attendance to a maximum of 800 people at the same time. The lower deck is also open, although work continues. The upper deck contains a Bungee jumping facility and a restaurant.

=== Gallery ===
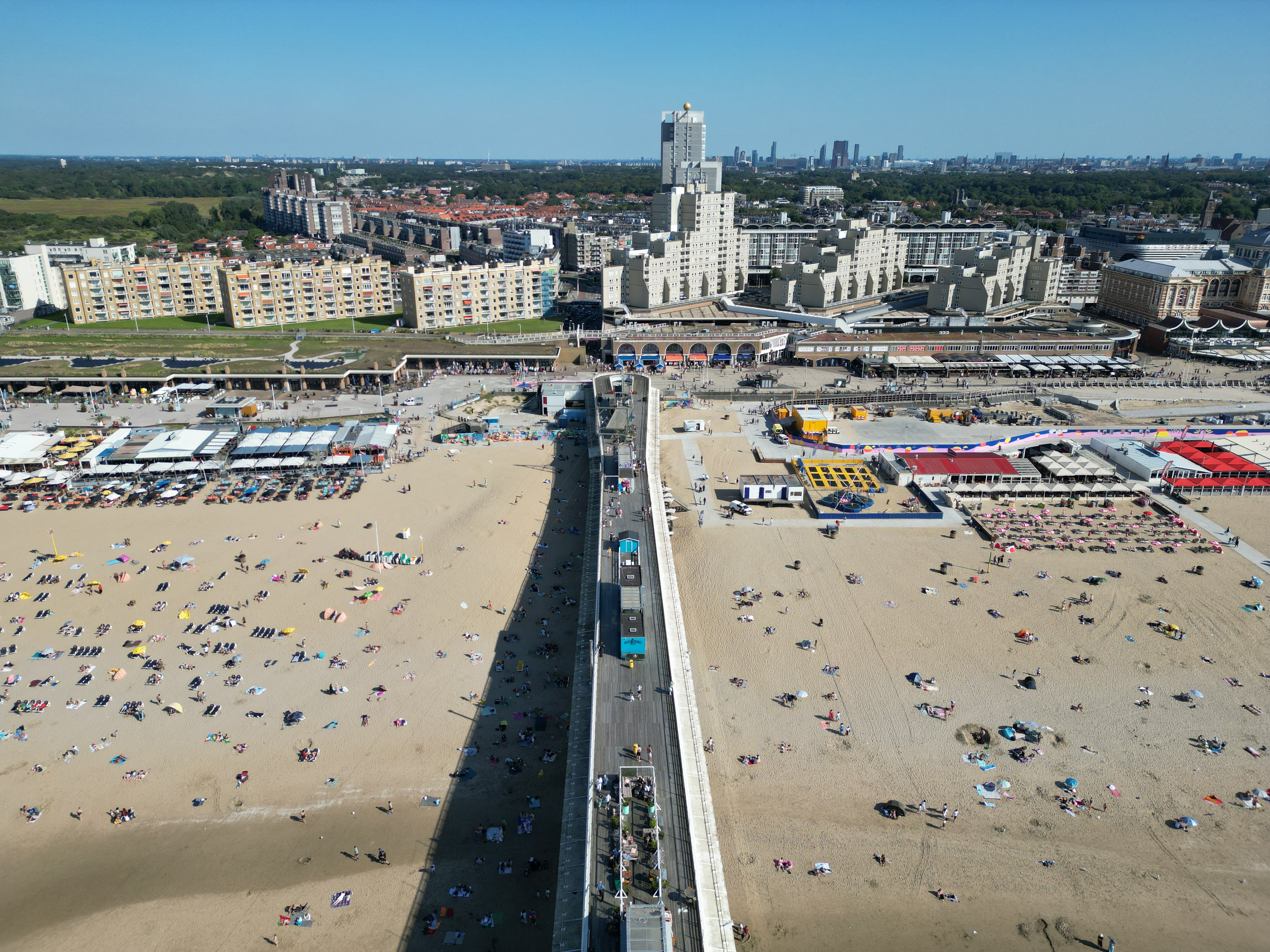
Scheveningen Pier in 2024

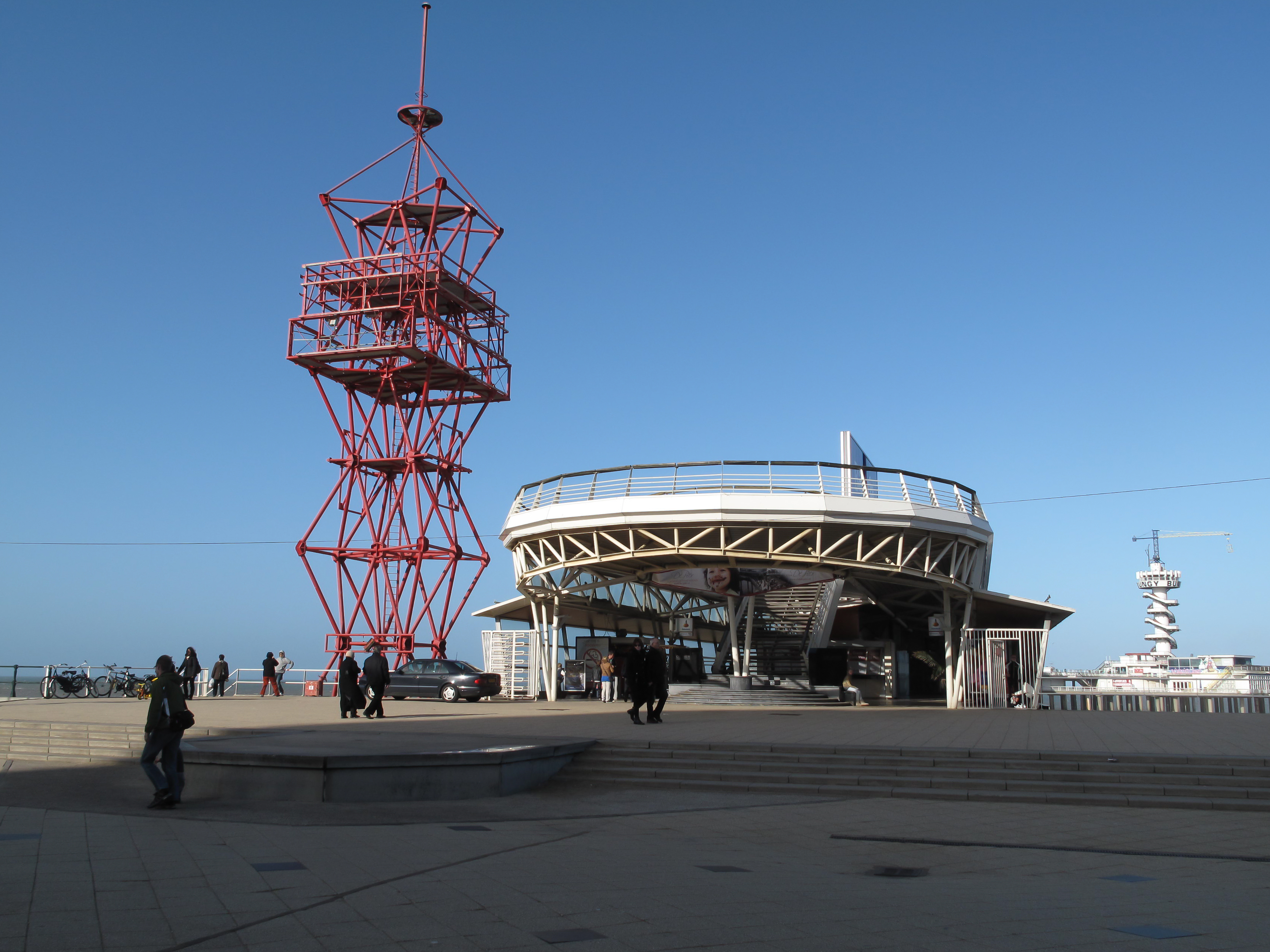
Pier entrance

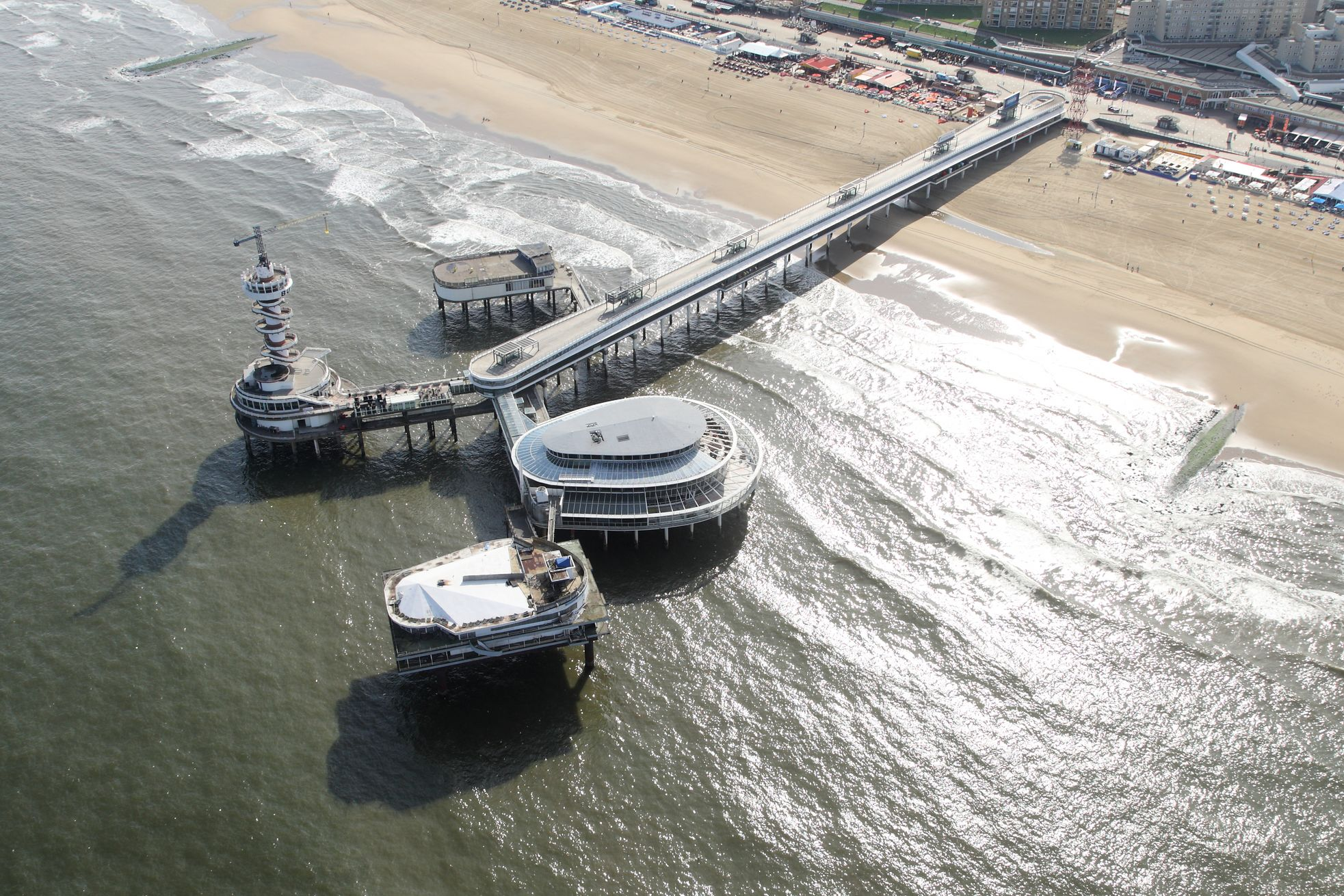
Aerial photograph of the pier

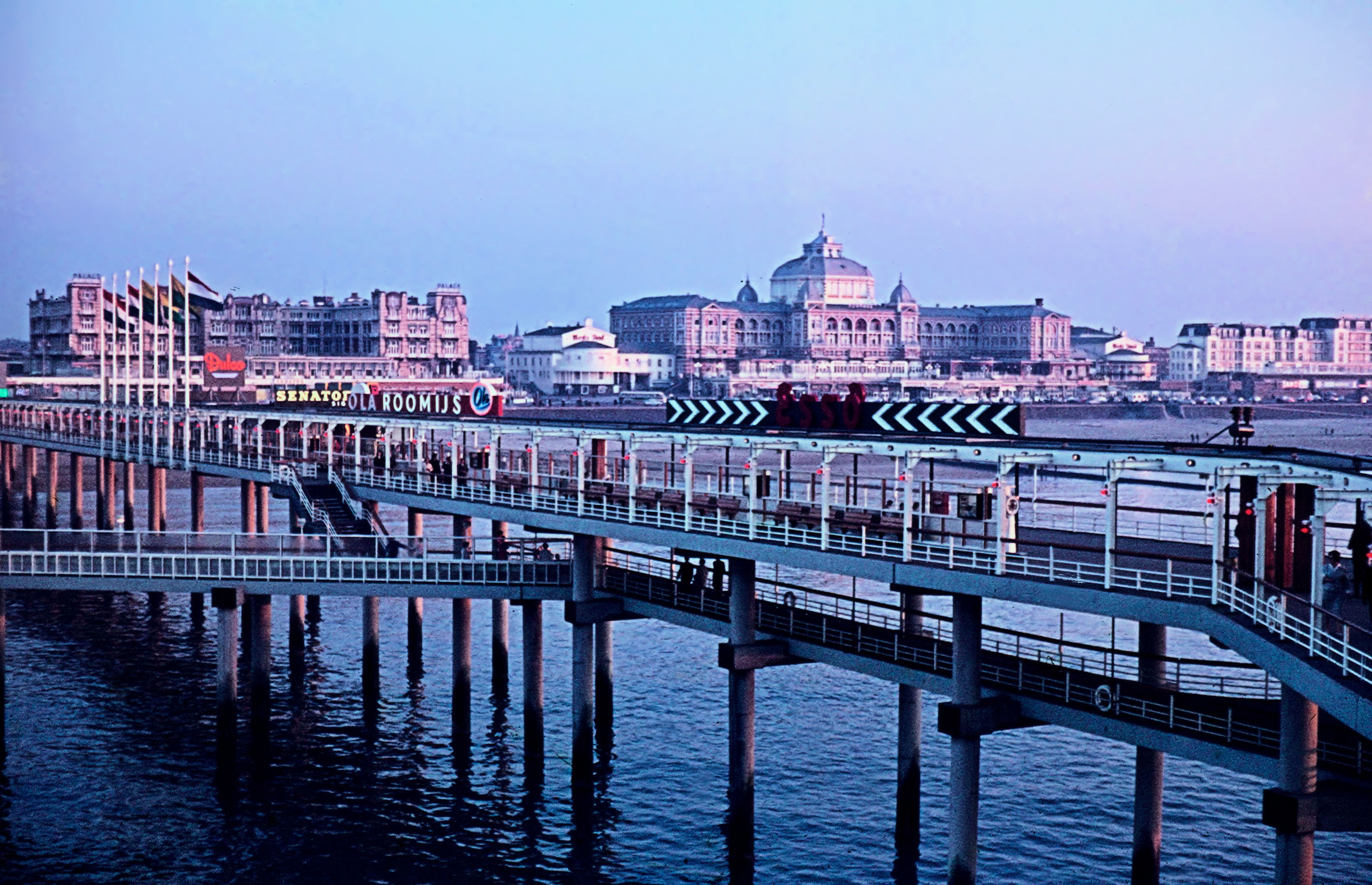
The pier and the Kurhaus in 1962

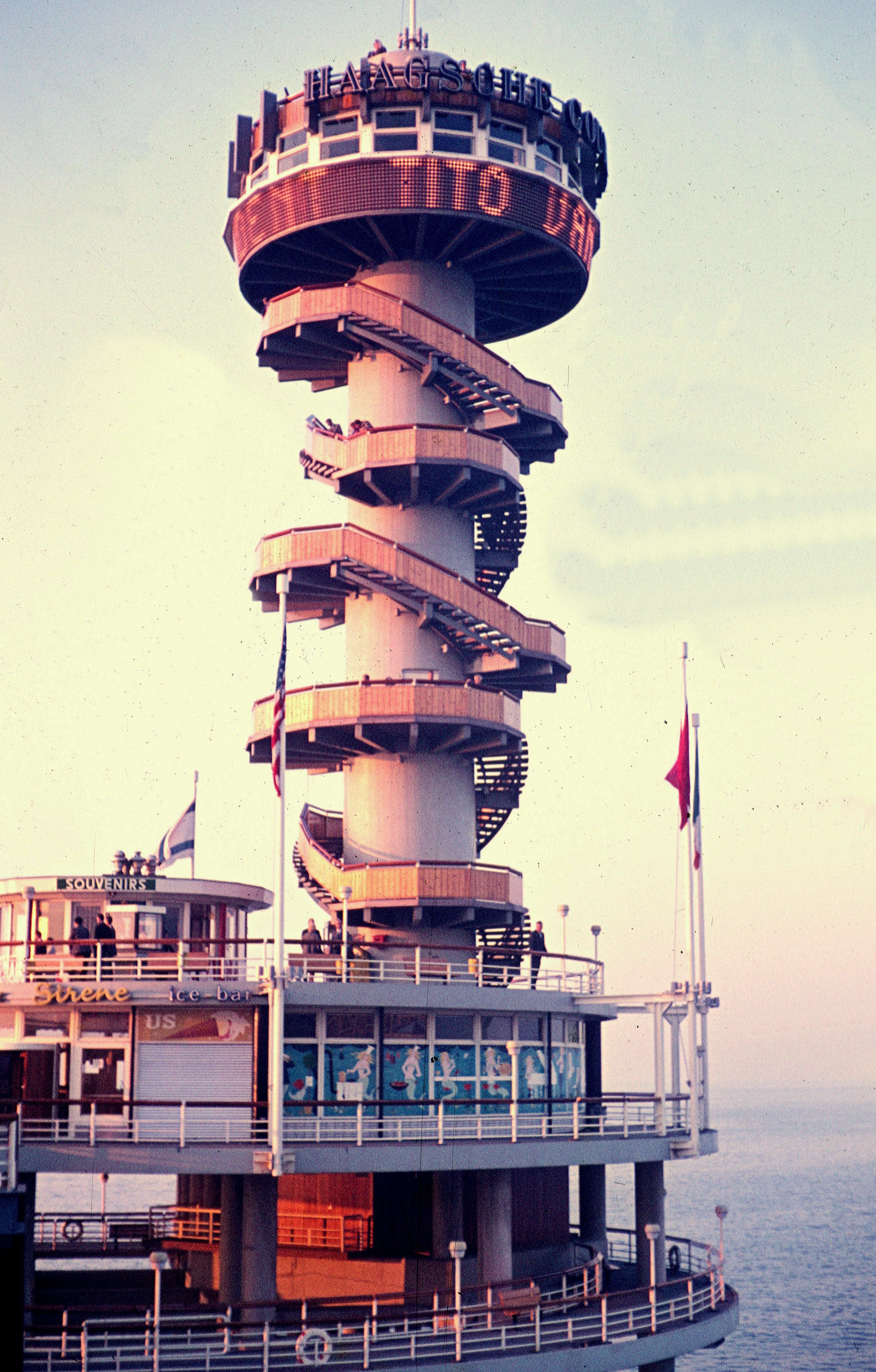
Scheveningen Pier in 1962

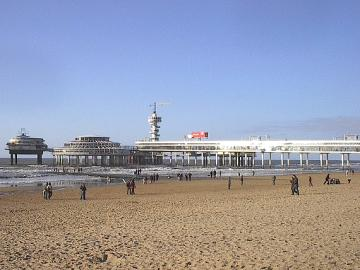
The pier

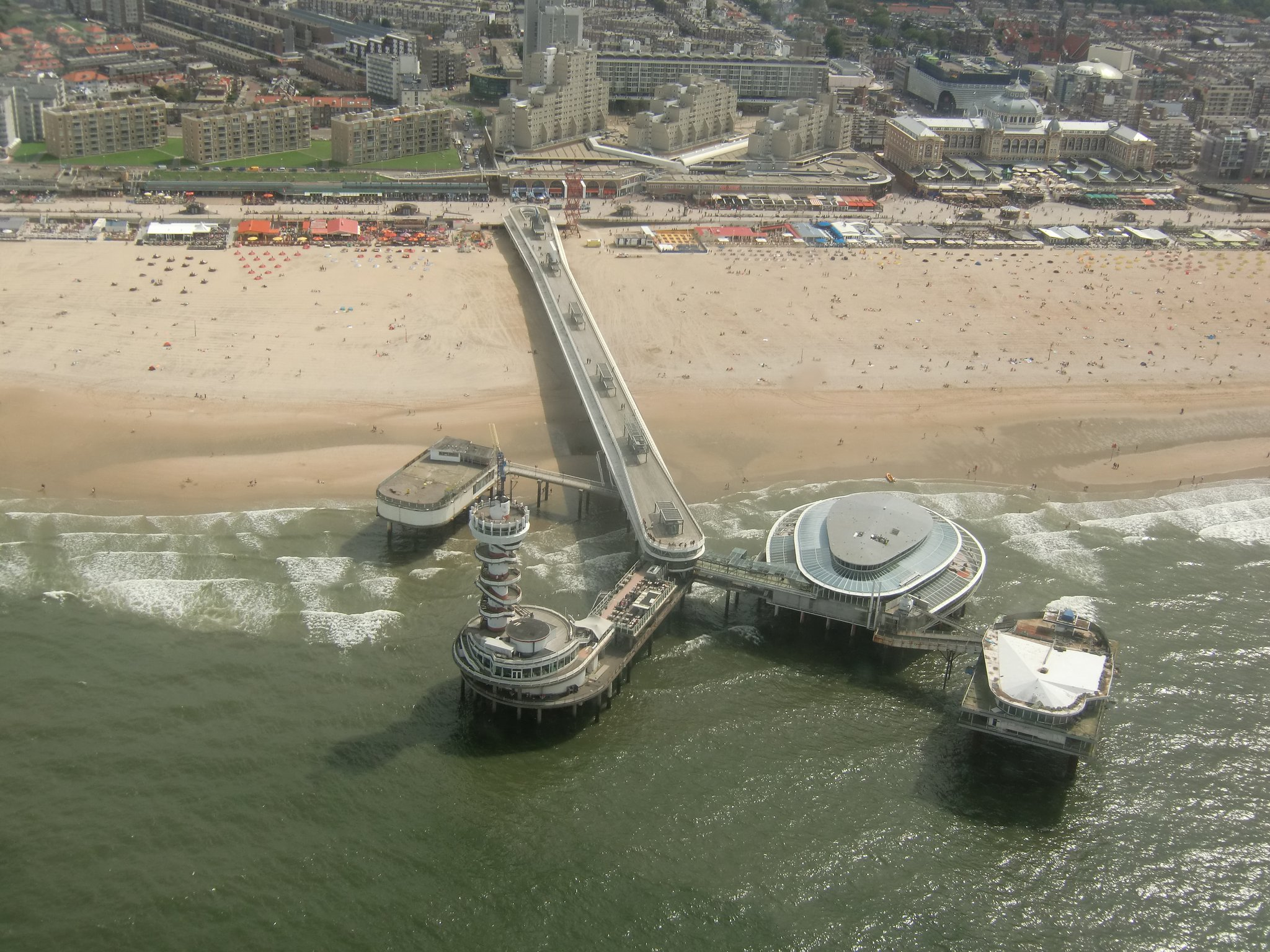
Scheveningen Pier in 2011

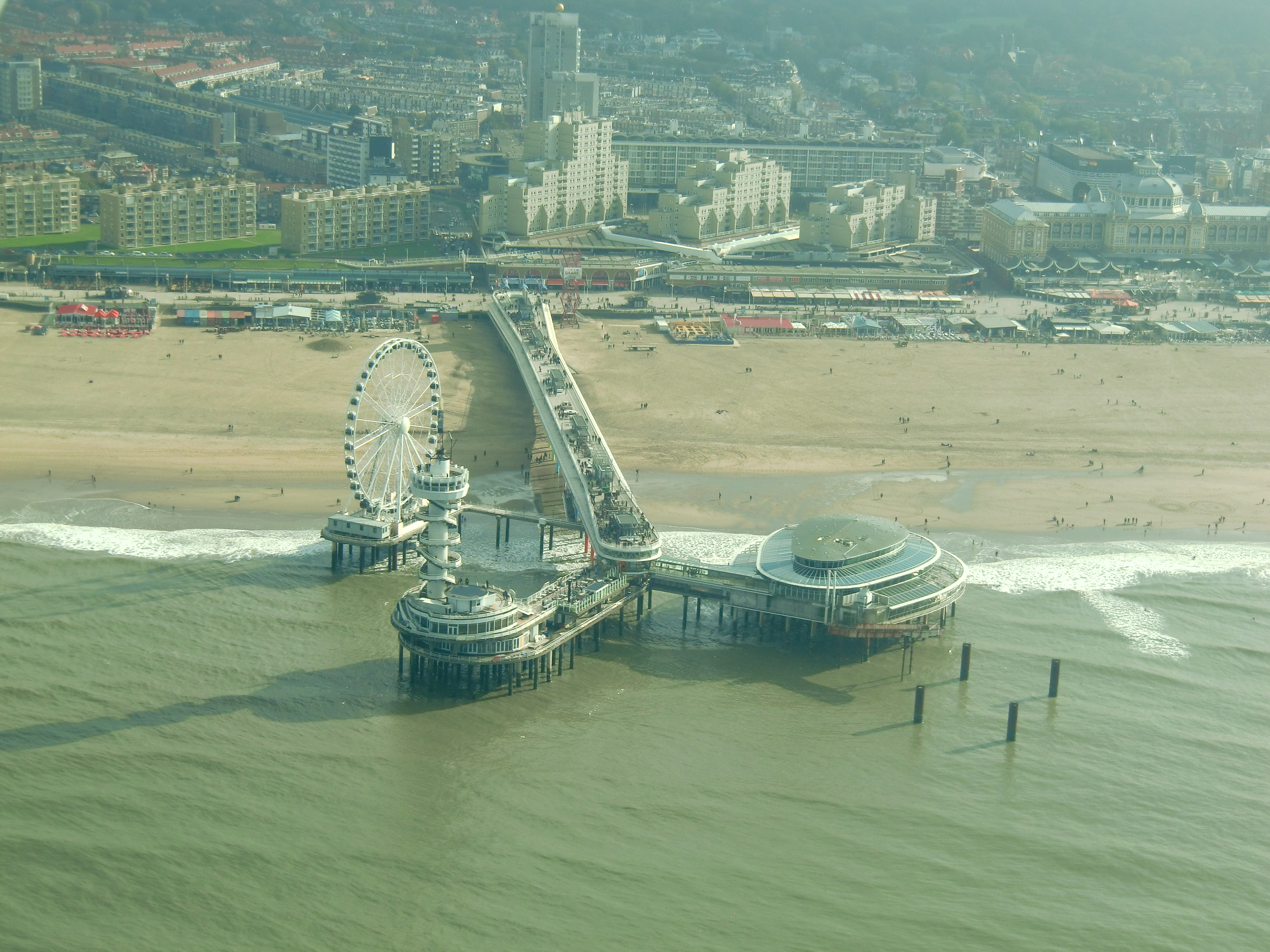
Scheveningen Pier in 2016, after the steel island has been removed

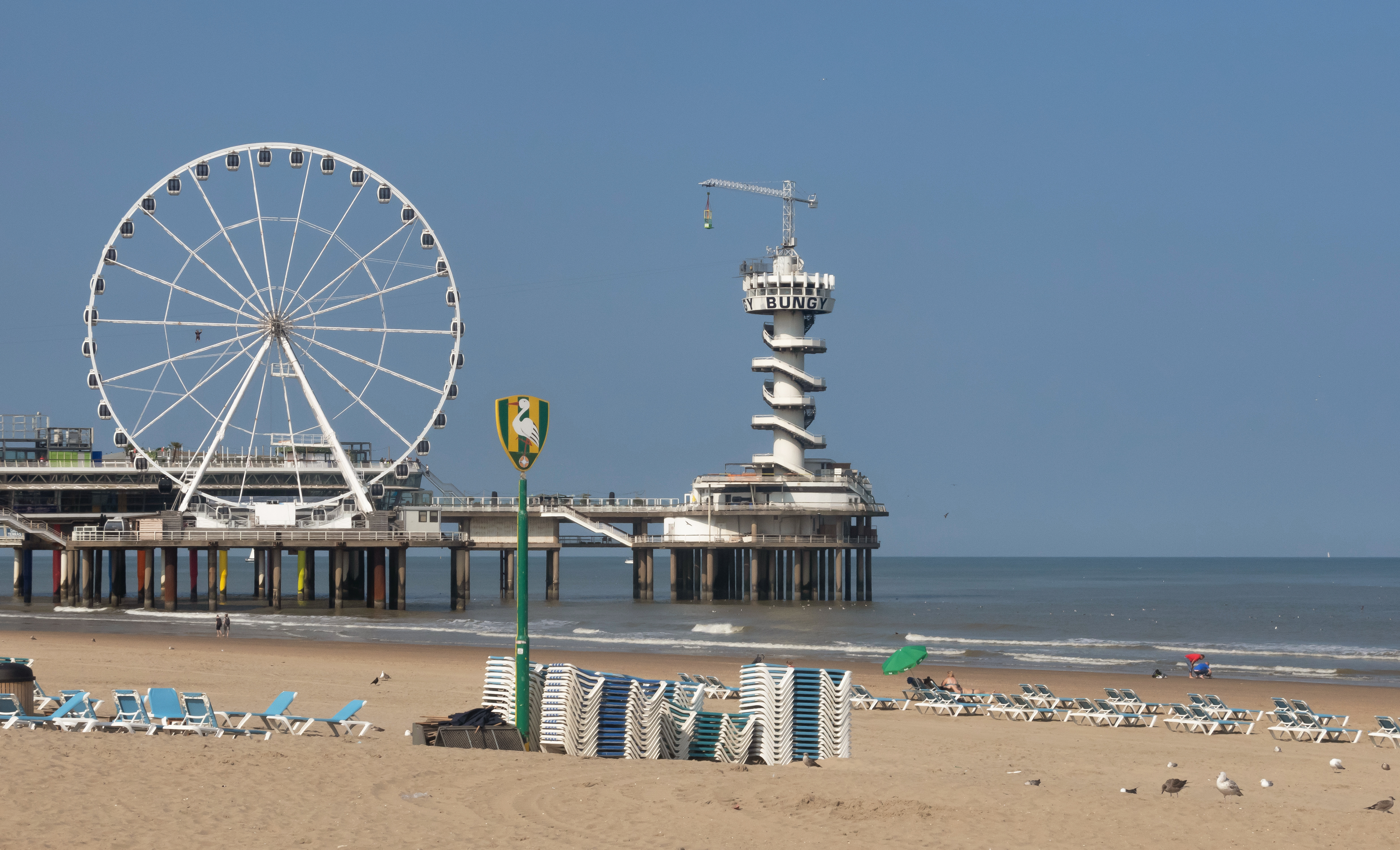
Pier in 2011

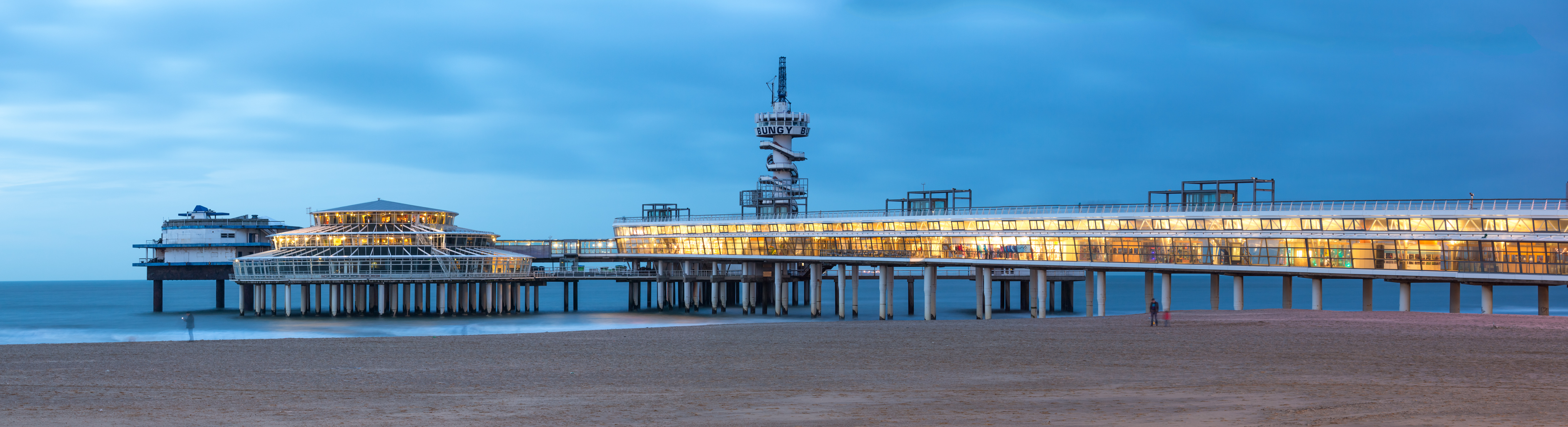
Panorama of the Scheveningen pier during the blue hour
