= Hofplein =

Town square in Rotterdam, the Netherlands

Coordinates: 51°55′27.5″N 4°28′40.1″E

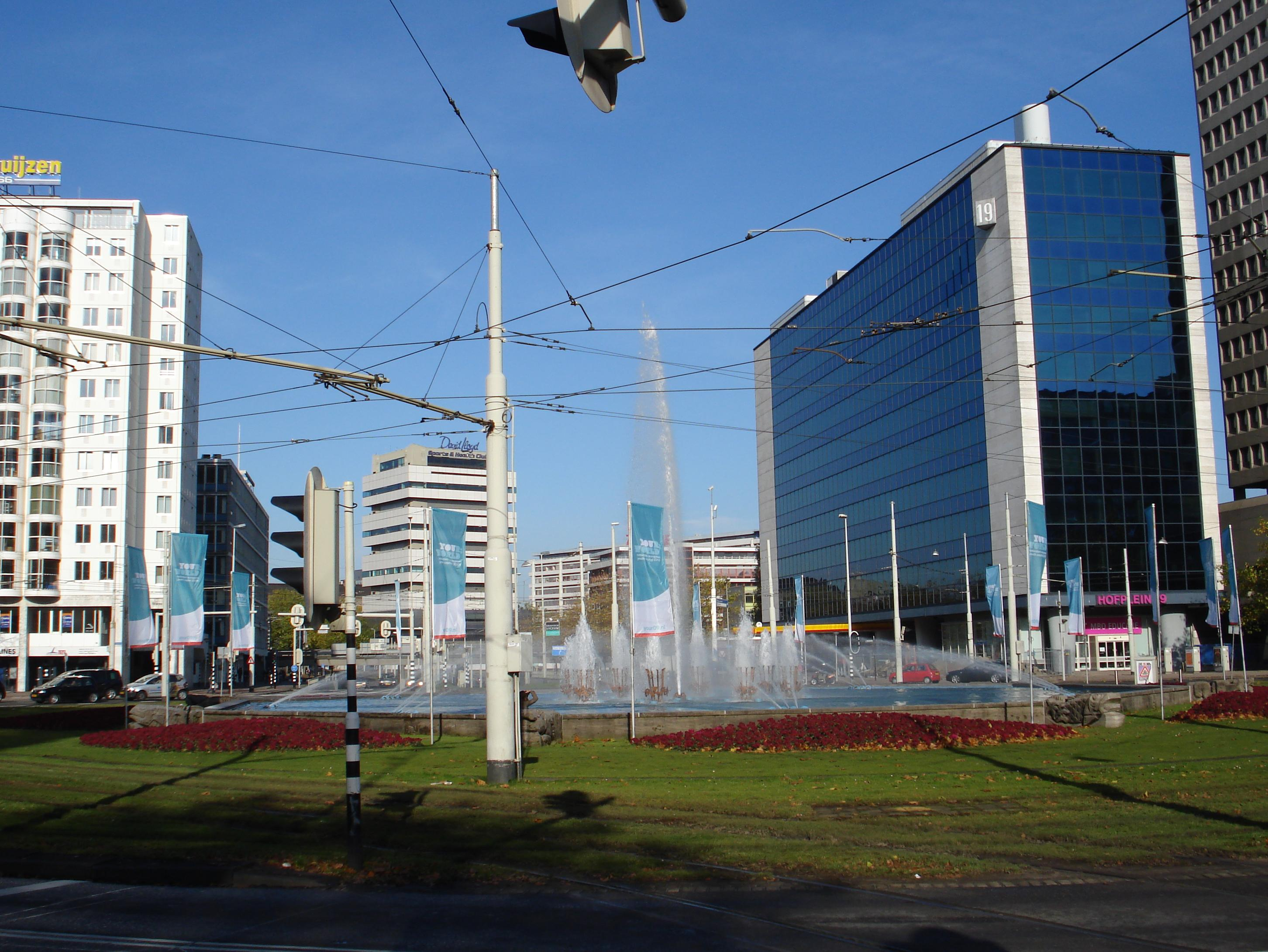
Hofplein

Hofplein is a major public town square in Rotterdam, the Netherlands. The square lies on a crossing of the Weena, the Schiekade and the Coolsingel. In the center of the square a large fountain is situated.

Near the square lay the former Rotterdam Hofplein railway station.
