= Beukelsdijk =

Street in Rotterdam, the Netherlands

Coordinates: 51°55′16″N 4°27′20″E

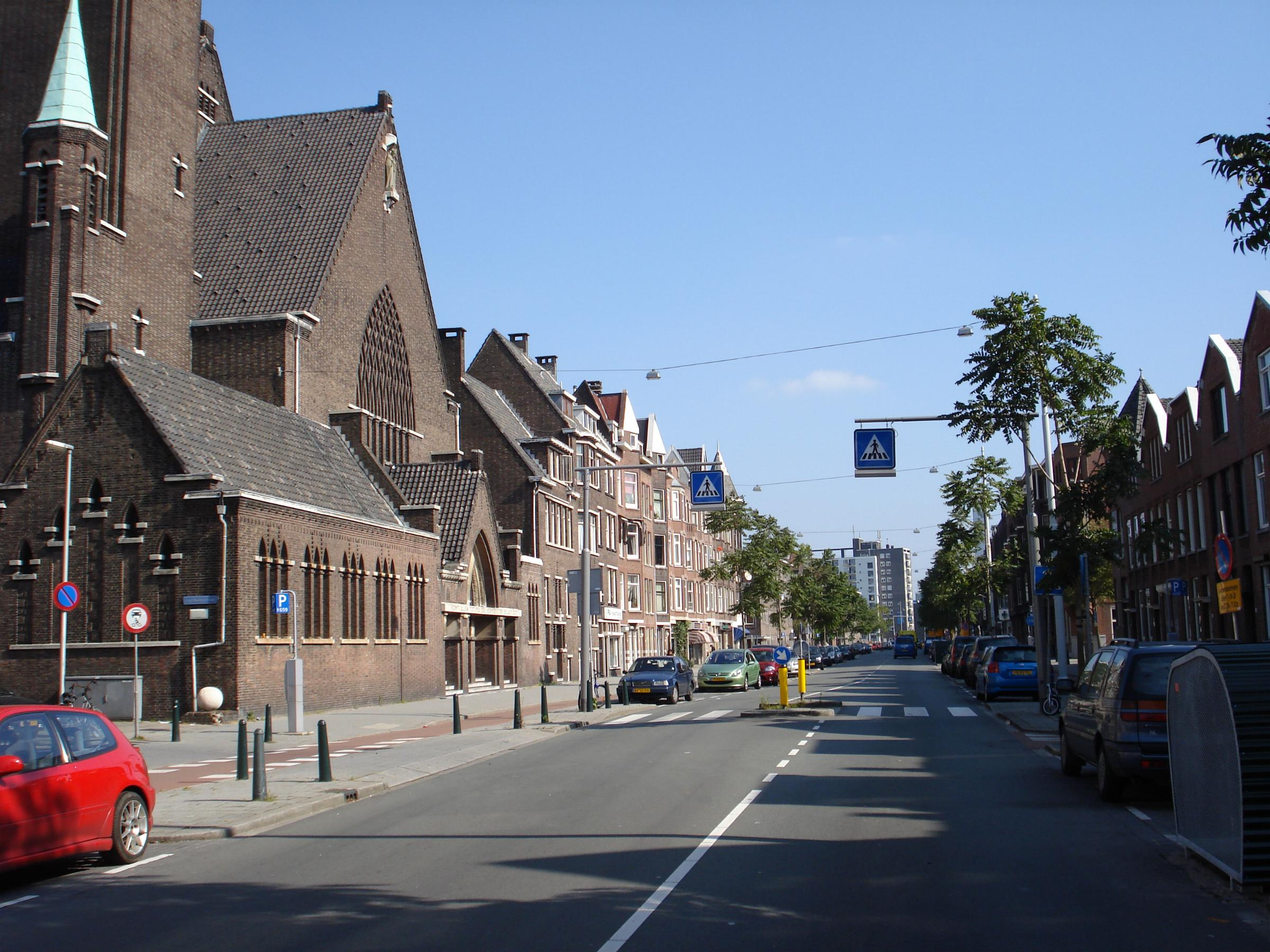
Beukelsdijk, Rotterdam

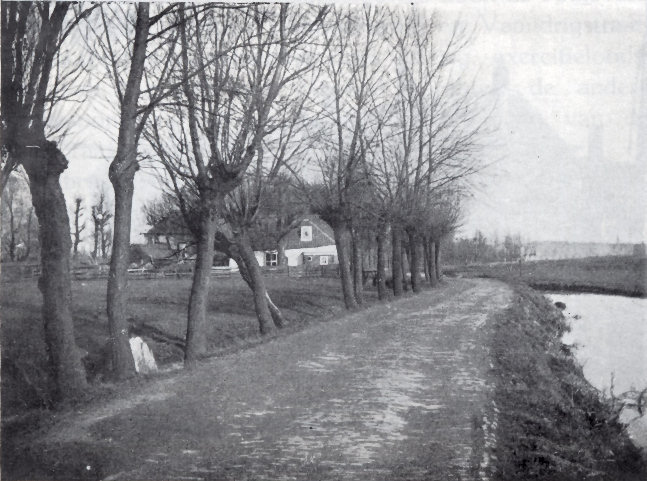
Beukelsdijk in the 19th century

Beukelsdijk is a street in Rotterdam, connecting Rotterdam and Schiedam. It leads from the crossing with the Henegouwerlaan near the tunnel traverse (where it continues from the Weena), to the Burgemeester Meineszplein in the neighbourhood Middelland, where it continues as the Beukelsweg.
