= Groothandelsgebouw =

Coordinates: 51°55′23″N 4°28′8″E

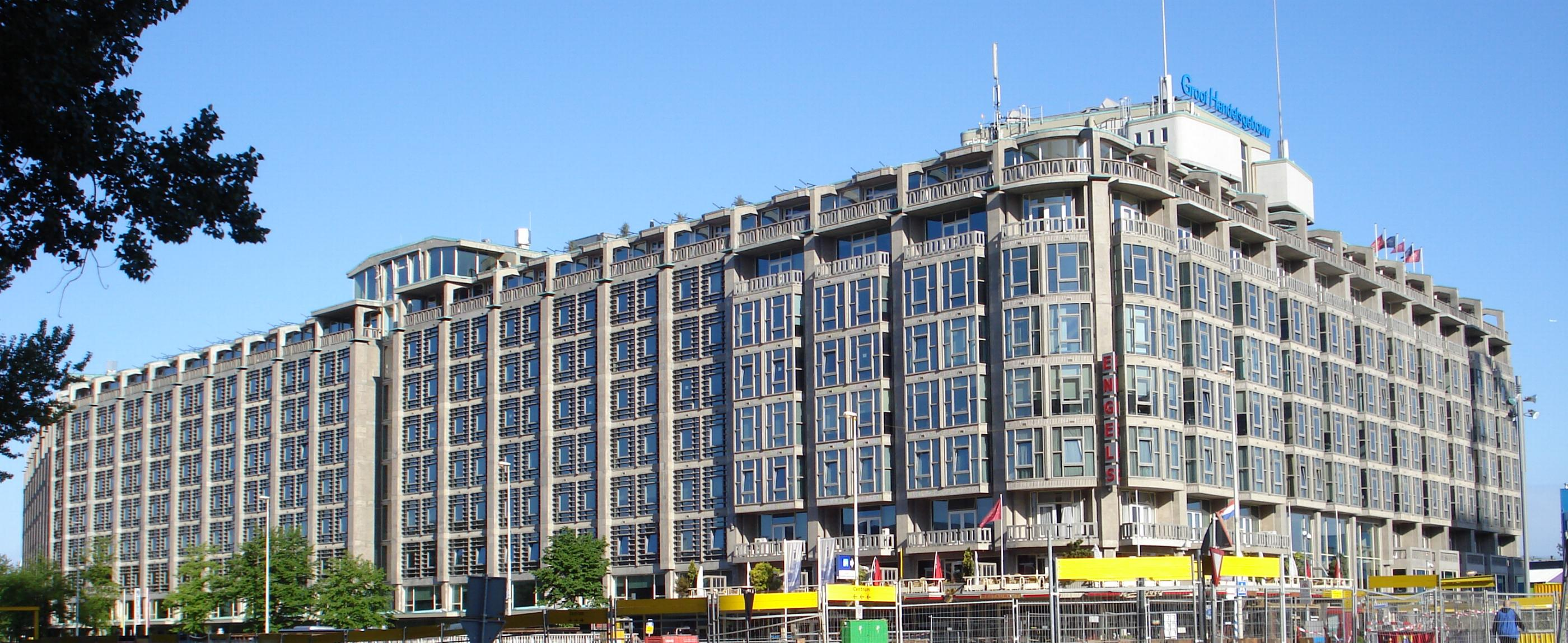
The Groothandelsgebouw of Rotterdam

The Groothandelsgebouw (meaning Wholesale Building or Offices) is an extensive building and monument in the center of Rotterdam, Netherlands next to the Central Station of the city. Completed in 1953 it is one of the first major buildings built after the bombing of Rotterdam in the Second World War.

Because during the war much business was lost, there were early plans for new office space. The idea for a new building came from a wholesaler Frits Pot who realized that a rather large building would be smaller than tens of buildings of separate wholesalers. During Christmas 1944 he made a sketch and on May 4, 1945, it was discussed in the Chamber of Commerce. Together with architect Hugh Maaskant and (later Director) G. Thurmer he made a study trip to Chicago, USA in 1947. The building is modeled after the Merchandise Mart in Chicago.

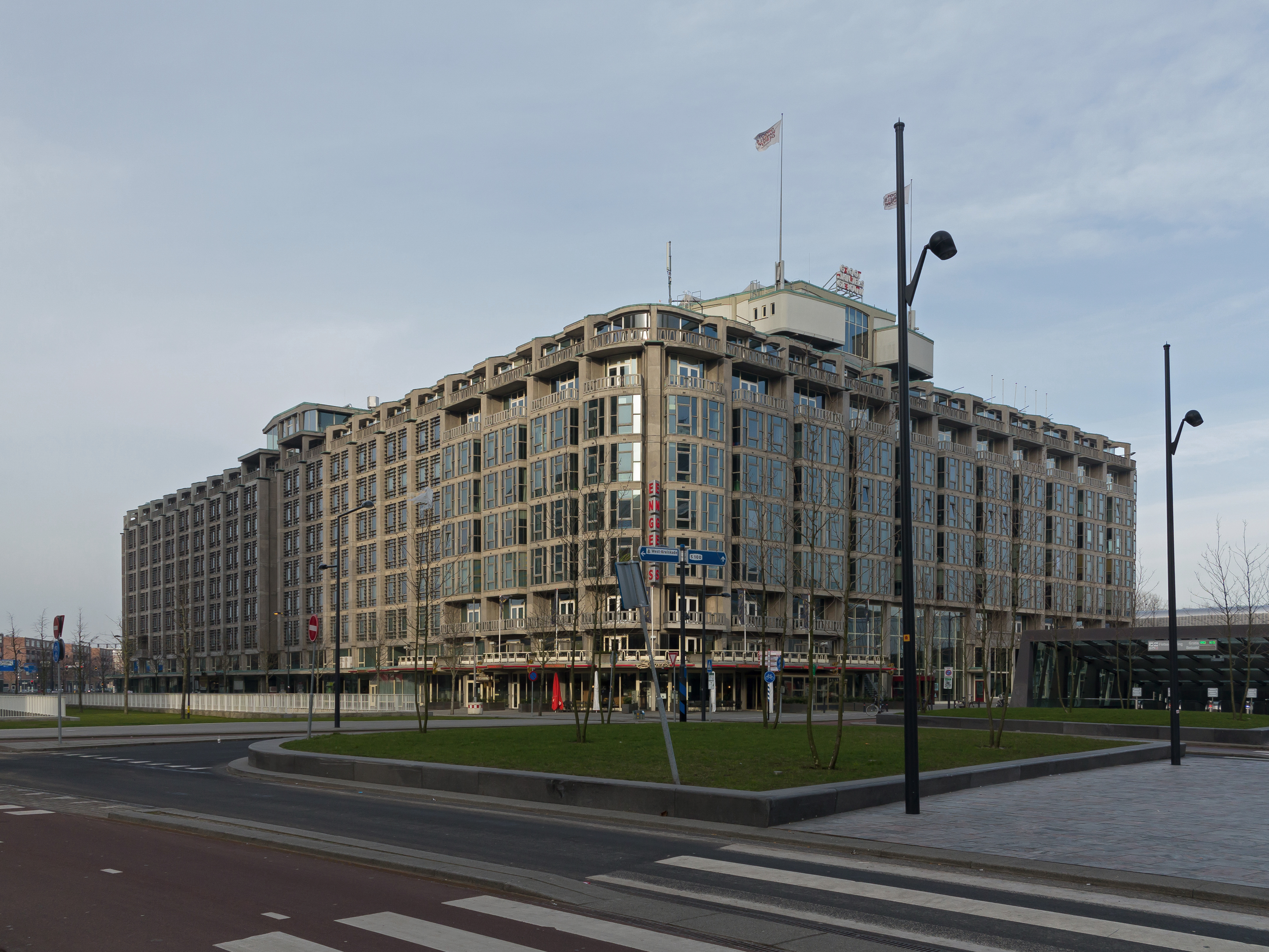
The Groothandelsgebouw in 2016

The final building fitted exactly in the vision of Rotterdam and the post-war reconstruction of the city. The Wholesale House was an innovative project for that time: the very large building was designed not only by many companies, but included a complete route through the building. During the construction phase in 1951 a grand cafe-restaurant, conference center etc. was installed. The building itself was completed in 1953.

Characteristic of this building is a constant grid of concrete columns in which the building rests. Center-to-center distance of the columns is 6.72 meters. The columns are octagonal. Supporting the outer walls are approximately 65 inches, the inner columns are about 85 centimeters.

The building has 5 entrances, marked with the letters A through E. The main entrance is located at the A station 45. The entrances D and E (sometimes called the back) are on Conrad Street. The building also lies on Weena Street.

Exceptions to the constant grid of the wholesale building are the spaces created by the oblique lines of the building. These (imaginary) lines are about the length of the A wing and the imaginary line from D to C.
