= Hugh Maaskant =

Dutch architect

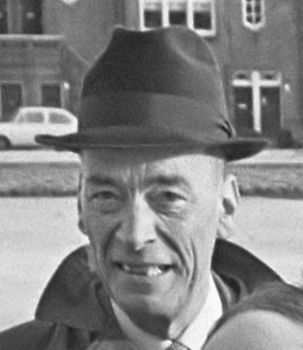

Huig (Hugh) Aart Maaskant (August 17, 1907 – May 27, 1977) was a Dutch architect. He designed a number of notable buildings in Rotterdam, his home city, and in Amsterdam, notably the Groothandelsgebouw in Rotterdam in 1951 and the Amsterdam Hilton Hotel in 1958.

== Selected projects ==
- Groothandelsgebouw Rotterdam 1951
- Tomadohuis Dordrecht 1962
- Euromast Rotterdam 1960
- Scheveningen Pier 1961
- Neudeflat, Utrecht 1961
- Hilton Amsterdam 1962
- Hilton Rotterdam 1964
- Student Centre De Bunker Eindhoven 1969
- Seat of government for the Province of Noord-Brabant 's-Hertogenbosch 1971

== Gallery ==
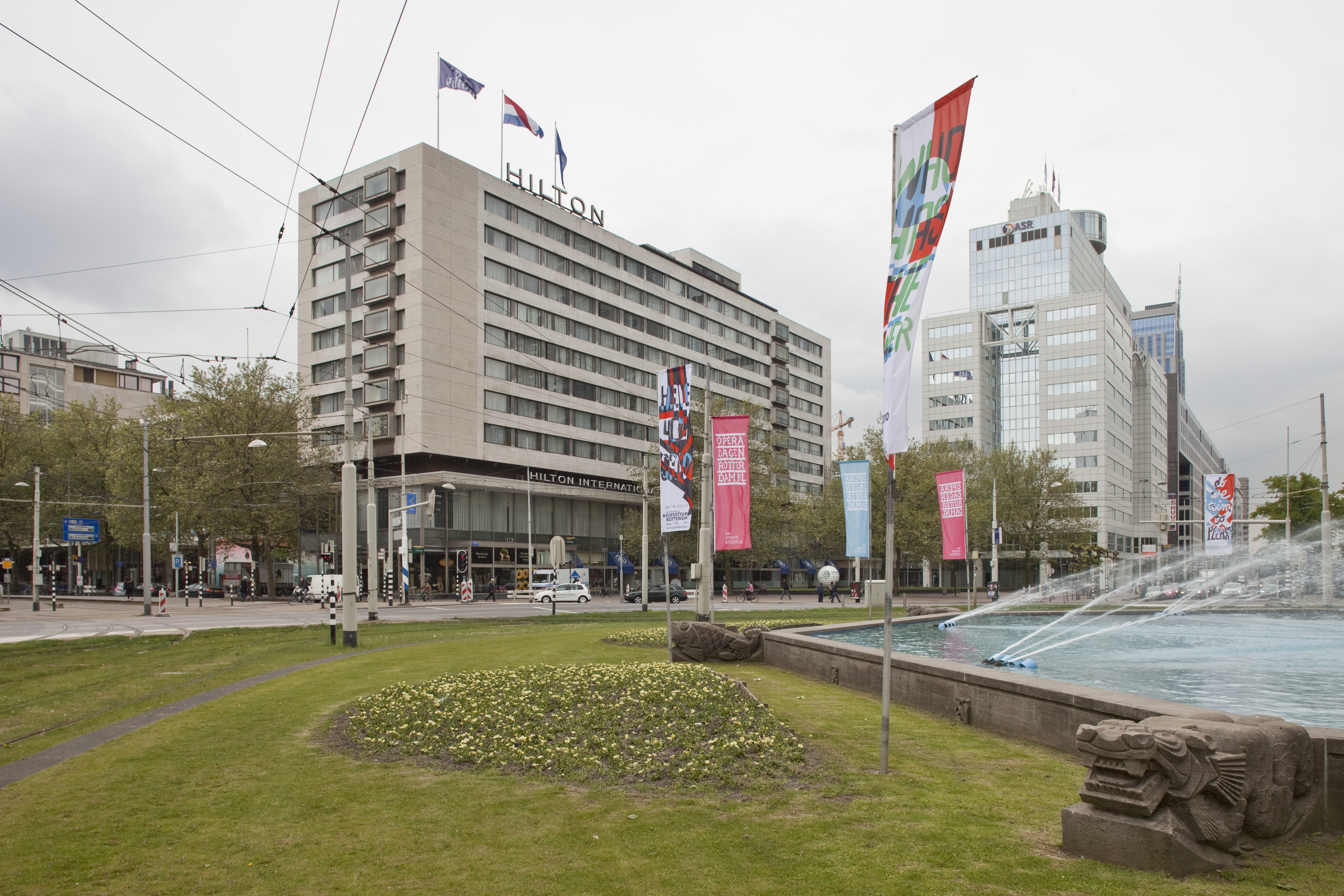
Hilton Rotterdam
Rotterdam, Netherlands

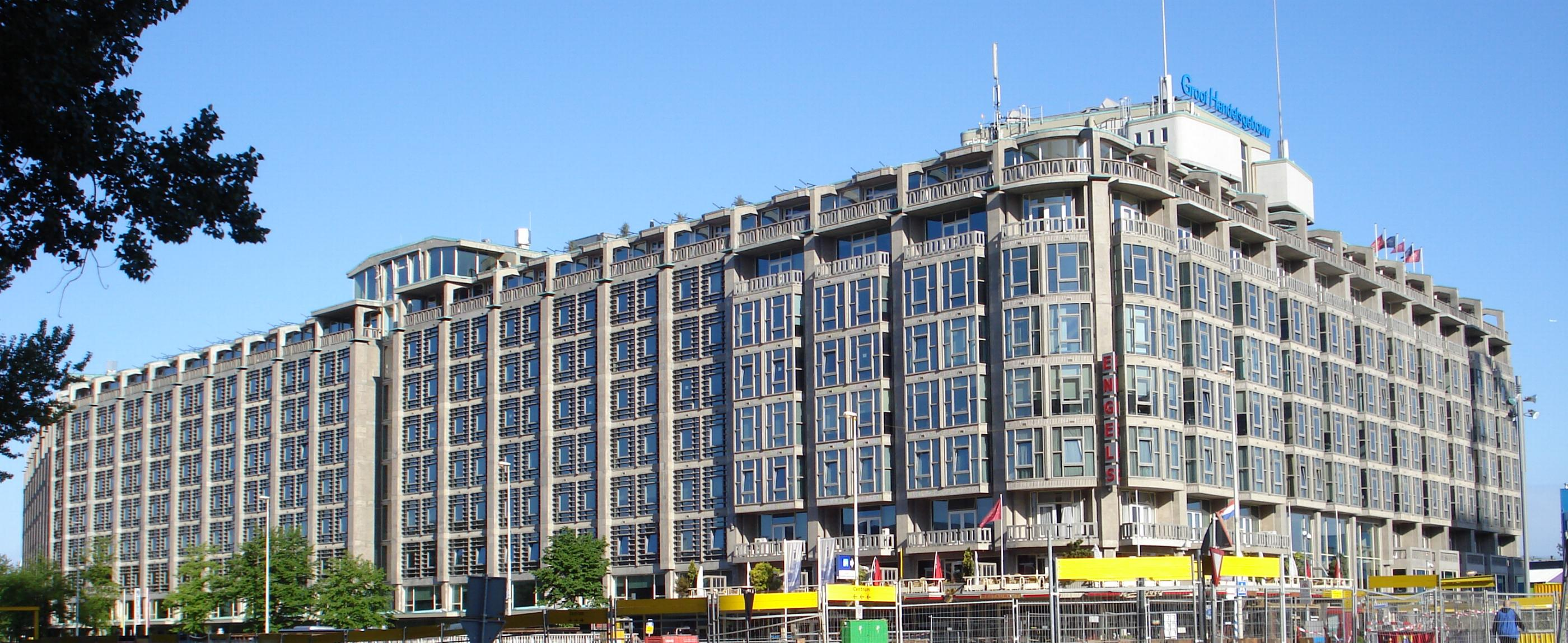
Groothandelsgebouw
Rotterdam, Netherlands

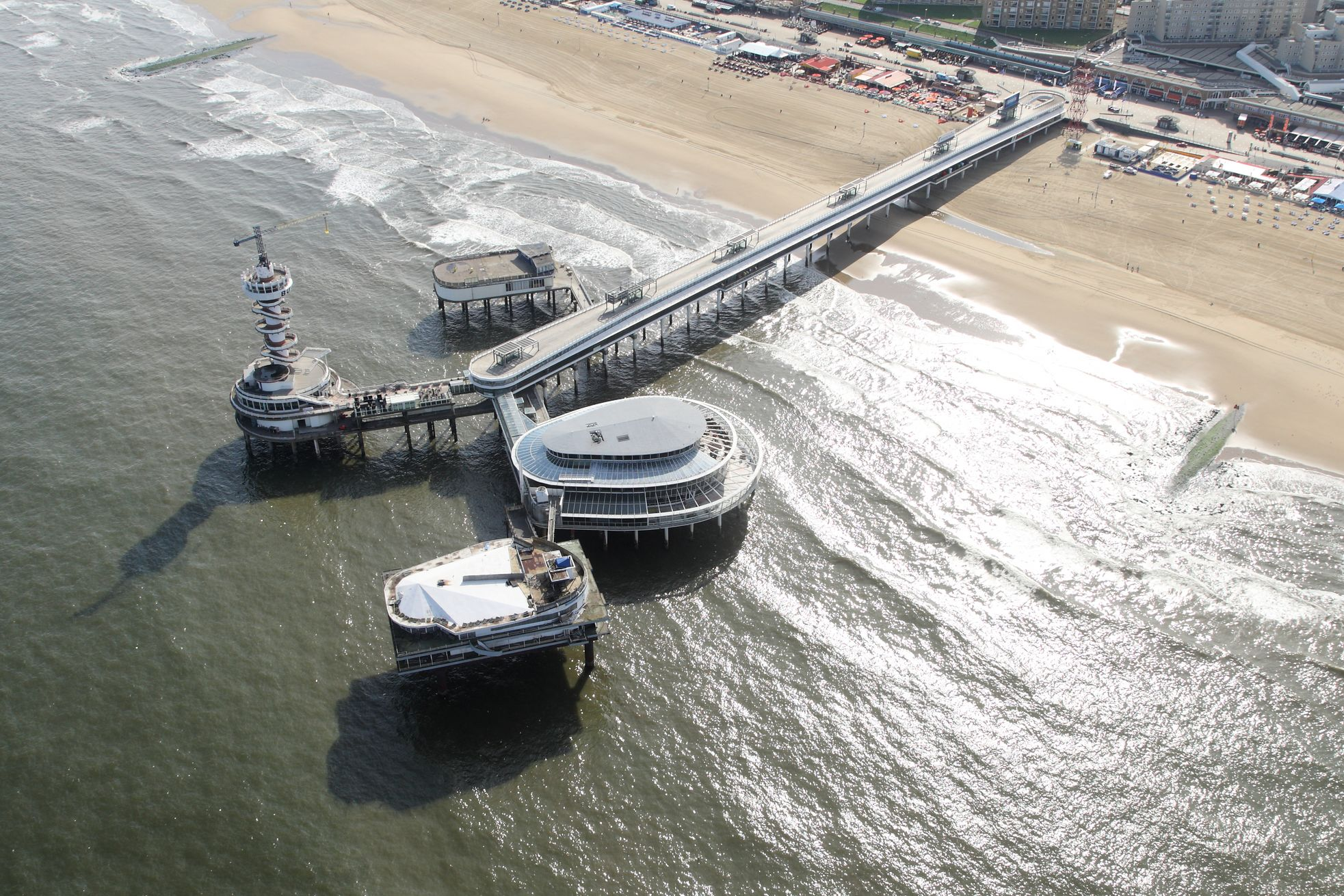
Scheveningen Pier
The Hague, Netherlands

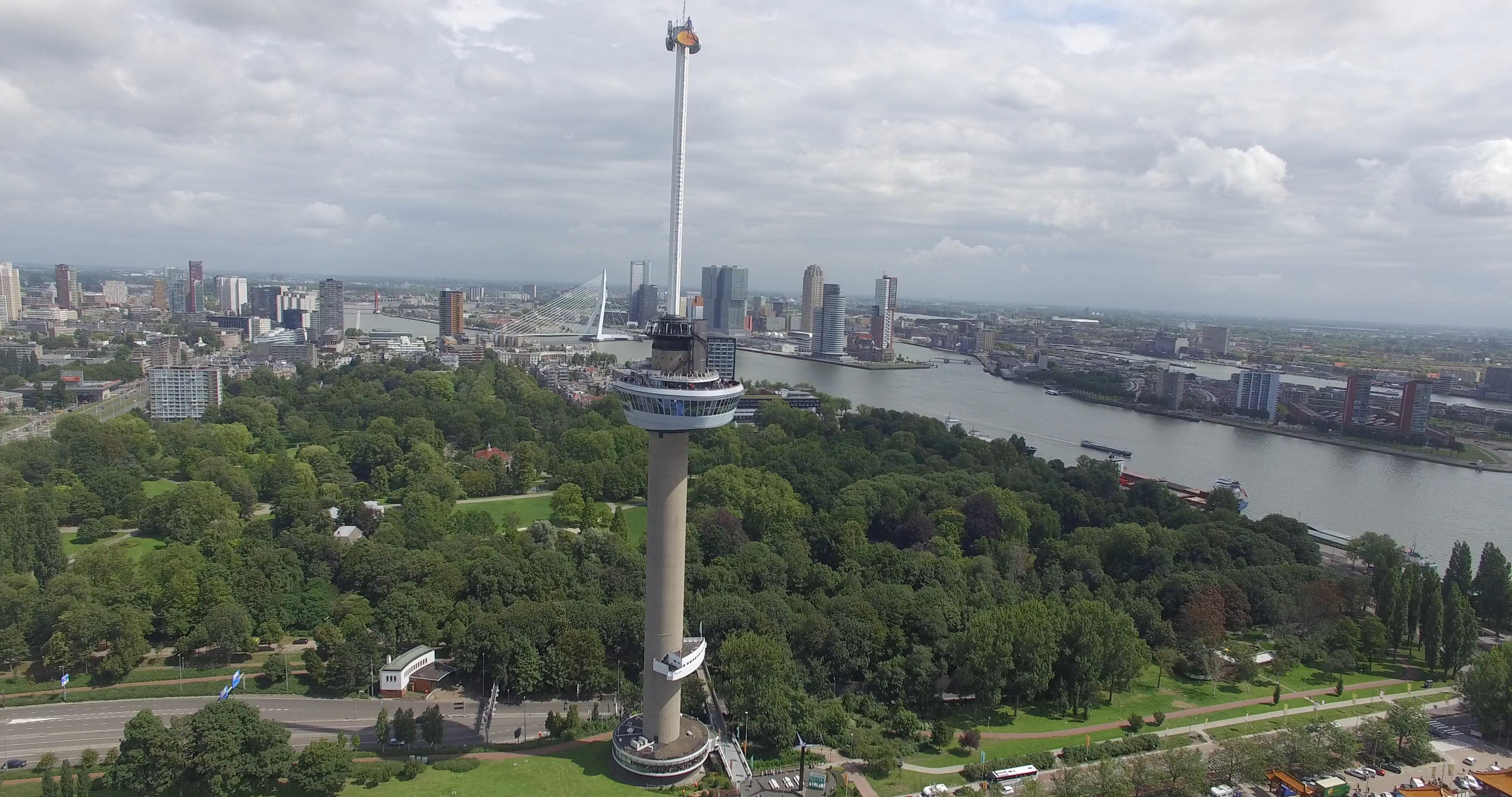
Euromast
Rotterdam, Netherlands

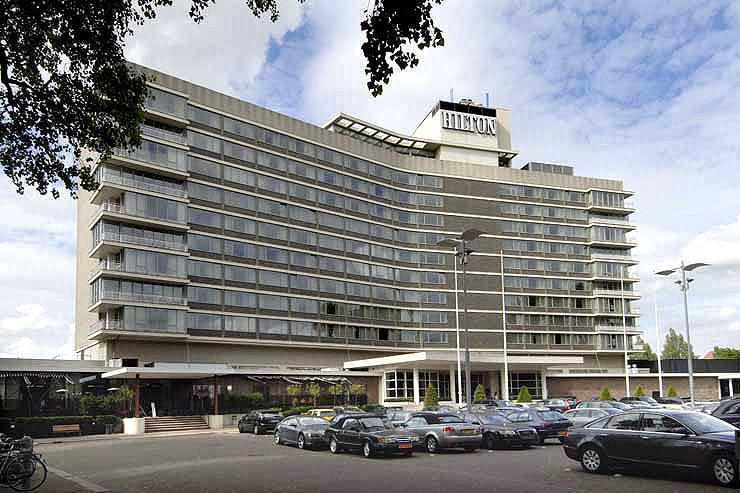
Hilton Amsterdam
Amsterdam, Netherlands
