= Bolwoningen =

Community in Den Bosch, Netherlands

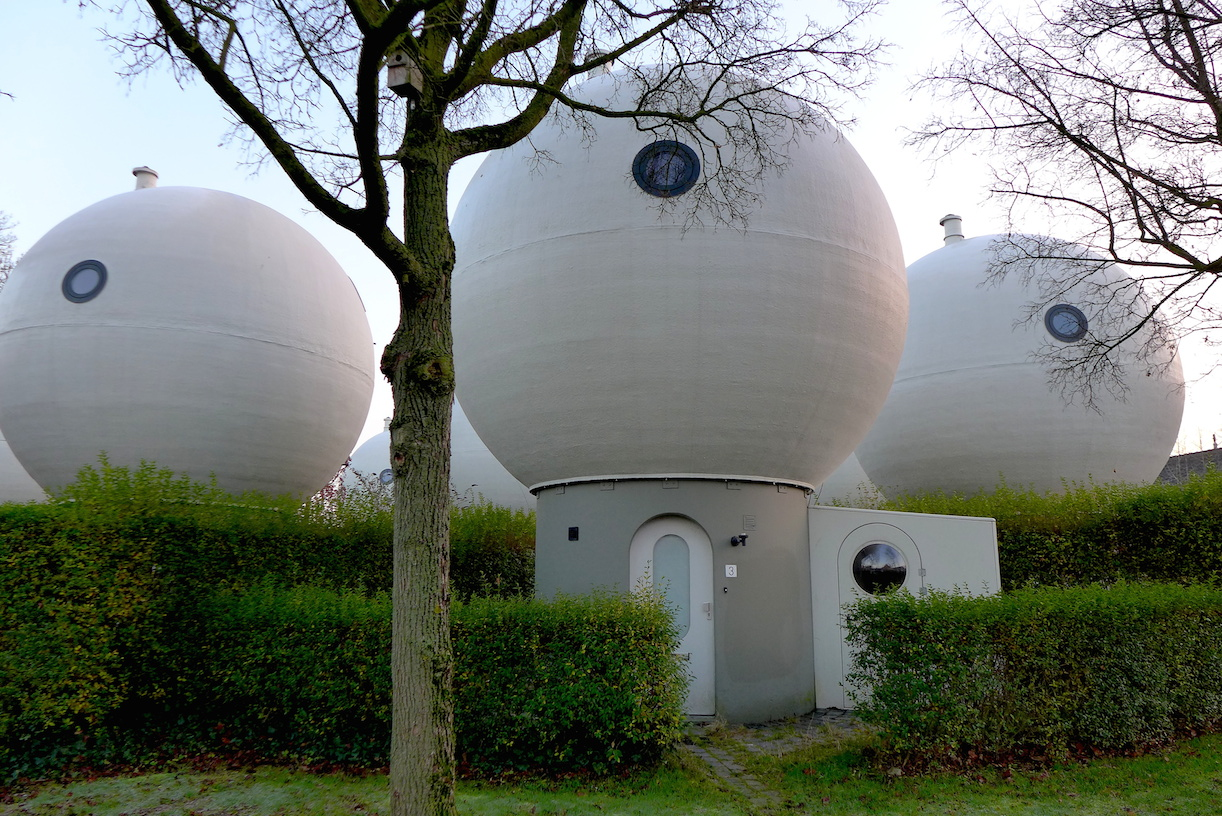
- External view of three houses (2016)
- Interactive map of the Bolwoningen area
- Alternative names: Bollenwoningen

General information
- Status: Occupied
- Type: Residential
- Location: Maaspoort, 's-Hertogenbosch, Netherlands
- Coordinates: 51°43′47″N 5°18′24″E
- Completed: 1984

Dimensions
- Diameter: 5.5 m (18 ft)

Technical details
- Material: Glass fibre reinforced concrete
- Floor count: 3
- Floor area: 55 m^{2} (590 sq ft) per house

Design and construction
- Architect: Dries Kreijkamp

Bolwoningen are Dutch spherical houses in the Maaspoort neighborhood of 's-Hertogenbosch, Netherlands. It consists of 50 spherical houses grouped together near to a canal.

== History ==
The houses were built in 1984 by artist and sculptor Dries Kreijkamp with a grant from the government to build experimental housing.

== Design ==
Each Bolwoning (literally 'sphere house') is constructed with Glass fiber reinforced concrete. The houses were prefabricated in Rotterdam and could be erected in as little as one day and were designed to have low energy consumption and easy maintenance.

Each house has three main levels, with storage in bottom. The first, bottom level is the bedroom, the second, middle is the bathroom, and the third, top floor is the living space. The top space features unique round windows that offer panoramic views. Each houses's total floor space is 55 square meters (600 sq. ft.), with a diameter of 5.5 meters (18').

The houses have been continuously occupied since the community was first constructed.

== Gallery ==
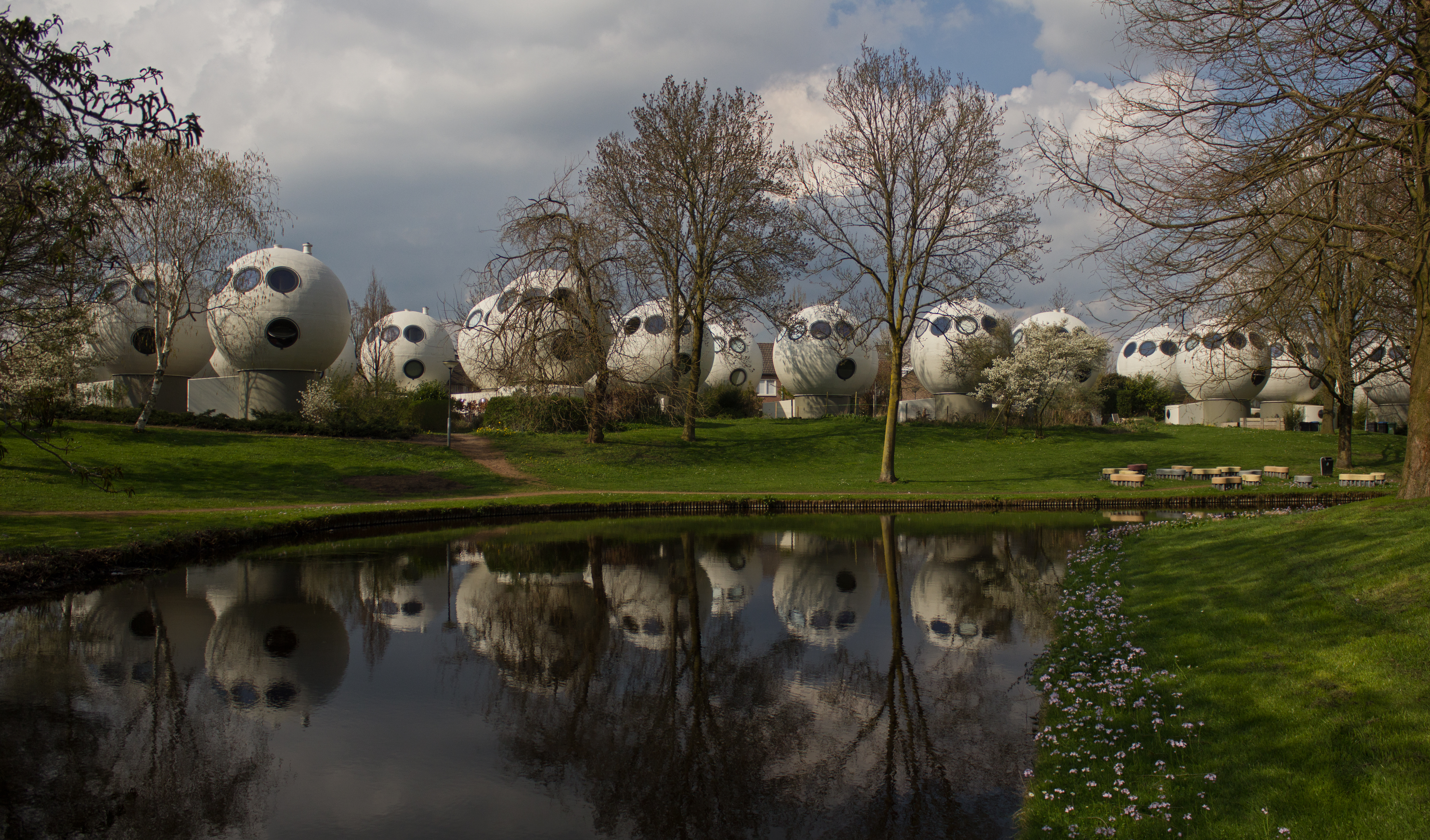
Group of houses along the canal (2017)

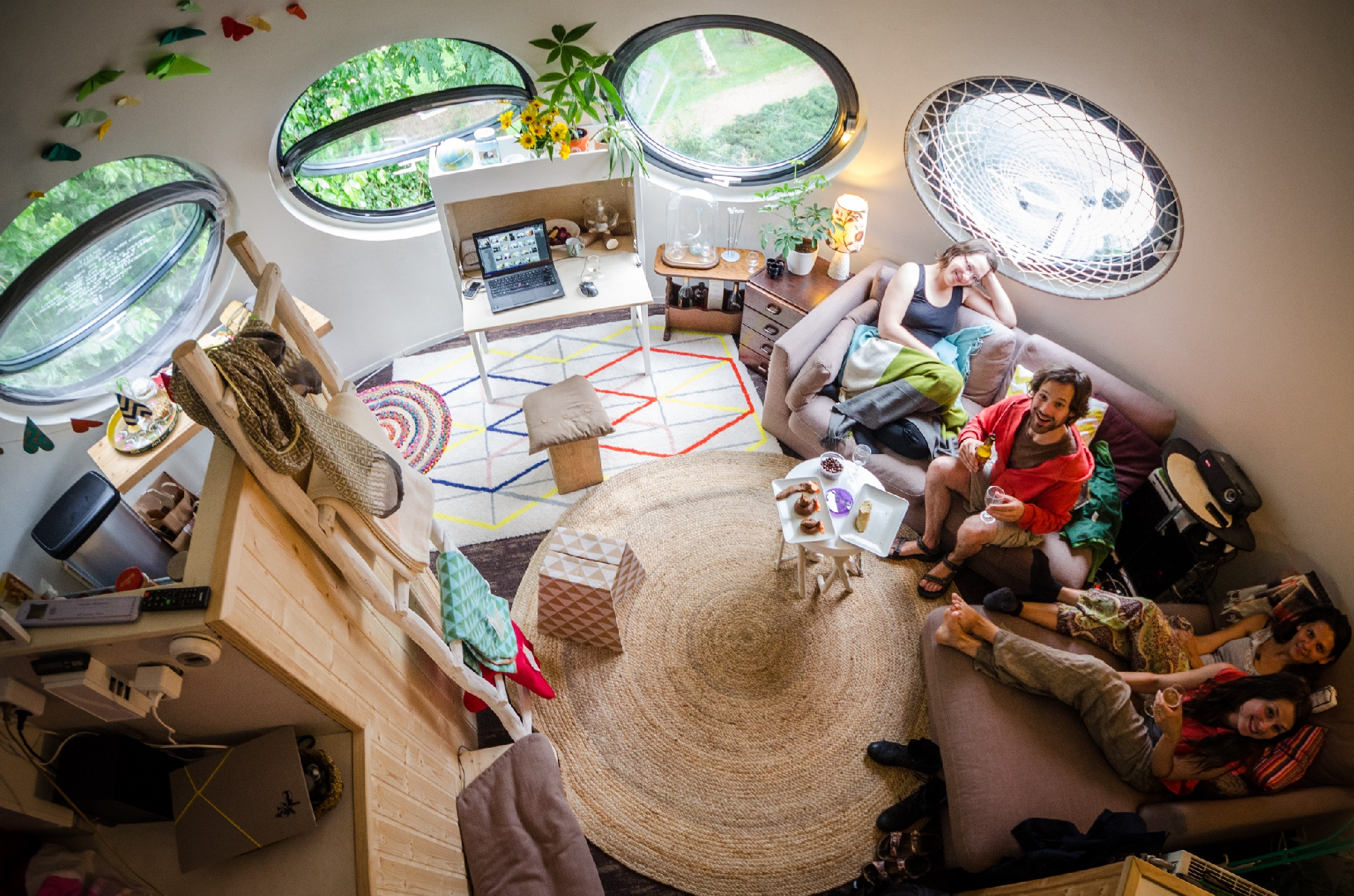
Interior of a bolwoning
