= Bastionder =

Military Museum

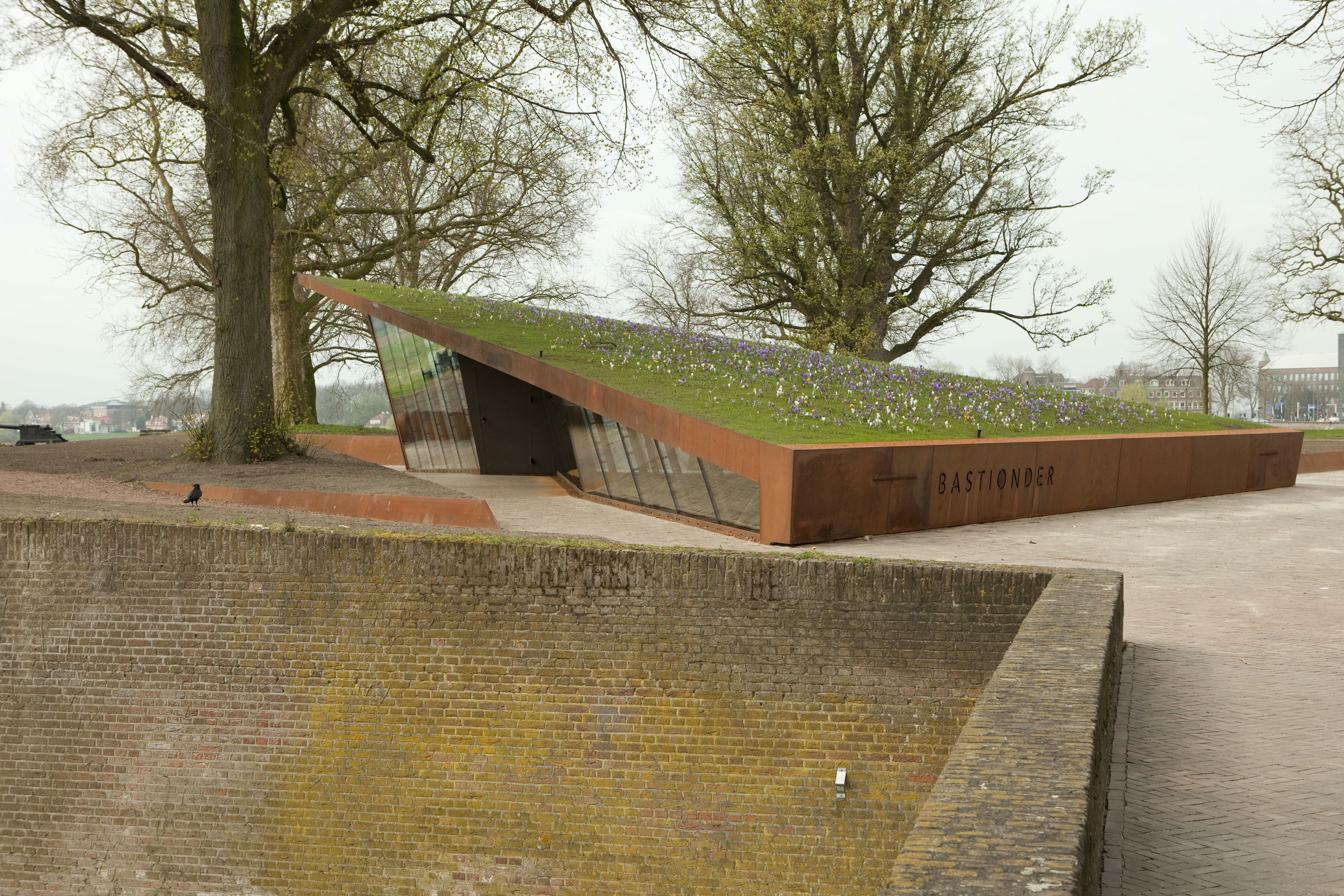
- The Bastionder museum
- Established: 1 April 2009
- Location: 's Hertogenbosch
- Coordinates: 51°41′3″N 5°18′13″E
- Architects: Marlène van Gessel; Marc van Roosmalen
- Website: www.erfgoedshertogenbosch.nl/contact/bezoeken/bastionder

Bastionder is a small military museum and information center built into Bastion 'Oranje' in 's-Hertogenbosch, the Netherlands.

== Bastion Oranje ==
The Bastionder's first exhibit, the Bastion Oranje, was built in 1634 by the Dutch Republic after they conquered 's-Hertogenbosch in 1629. The Republic's subsequent review of the defense of 's-Hertogenbosch found that the distance between the two existing bastions - the 'Vught' and 'Baselaar' bastions - was too great to be defended only by the late-fourteenth-century tower located at the corner of the city wall, so they decided to add the Bastion 'Oranje'.

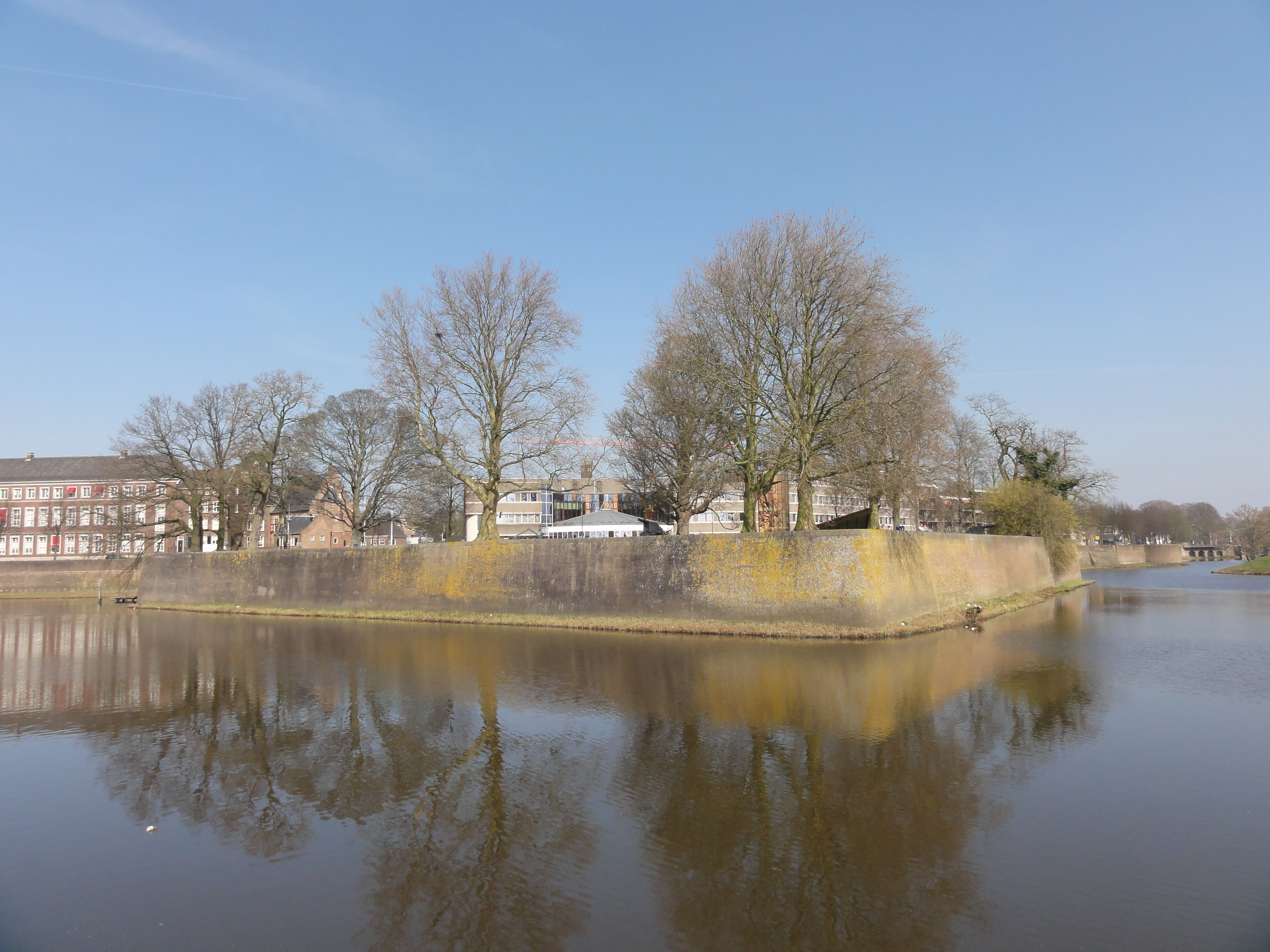
Bastion Oranje

At the time Bastion Oranje was a polygonal bastion much like the others, except that its name referred to the city's new masters. The walls were two meters thick, and the bastion was built to mount heavy artillery. It was built around the old medieval tower; though this practice was not unusual at the time, few examples still survive today. Later, the bastion would serve as the base for a windmill, a very common feature of city walls. In the early nineteenth century, an oil mill and floor factory with a 65-hp steam engine were built on the bastion.

After 1874 the bastion was no longer used as a defensive work. It could not simply be demolished because the city walls functioned as a dike. In 1885 the municipality bought the grounds of the Bastion Oranje and the factory was demolished.

== Bastionder ==
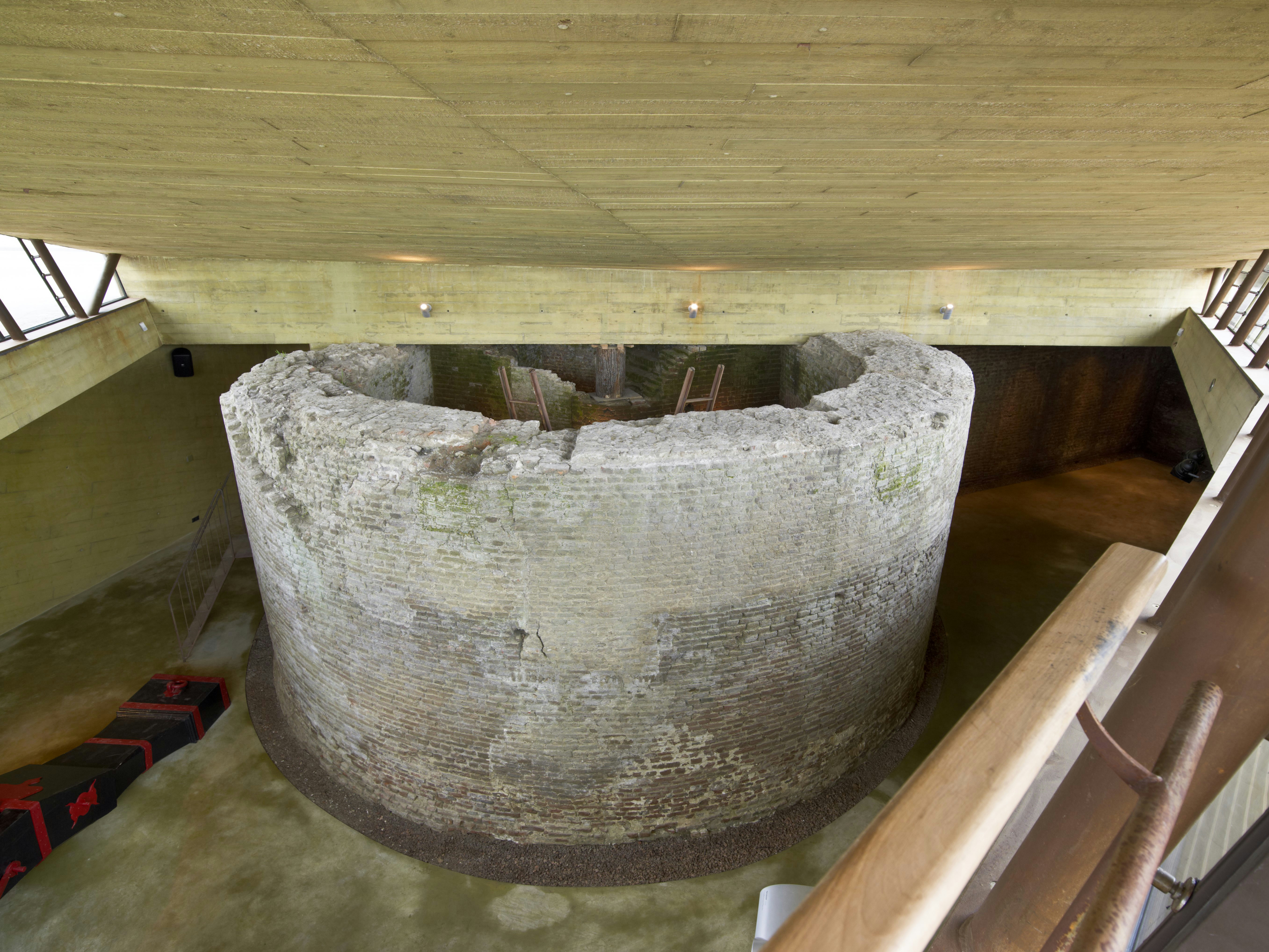
Bastionder from the entrance

The Bastionder project originally aimed to display the tower and part of the city wall in an underground visitor center called Bastionder. The tower in question had been pulled down and filled with sand around 1590 so that guns could be placed on top of it.

The name 'Bastionder' is a portmanteau of the Dutch words 'Bastion' and 'Onder' (under). The project excavated part of the underground area between the bastion's walls and the old city wall, covering it with a weathering steel and concrete roof with some windows. One of the requirements for the Bastionder was that it should disturb the existing park as little as possible. To meet this requirement, the roof only rises above ground level enough to provide a visitors' entrance. The roof is also covered with grass planted with crocuses, making it look like part of the park.

Some informational signs and a video presentation about the history of fortress 's-Hertogenbosch were added, creating a small visitor center. Apart from the buildings themselves the Bastionder exhibits one artifact: the wrought-iron cannon 'Stuerghewalt' cannon, also known as 'Boze Griet'.

== Stuerghewalt ==
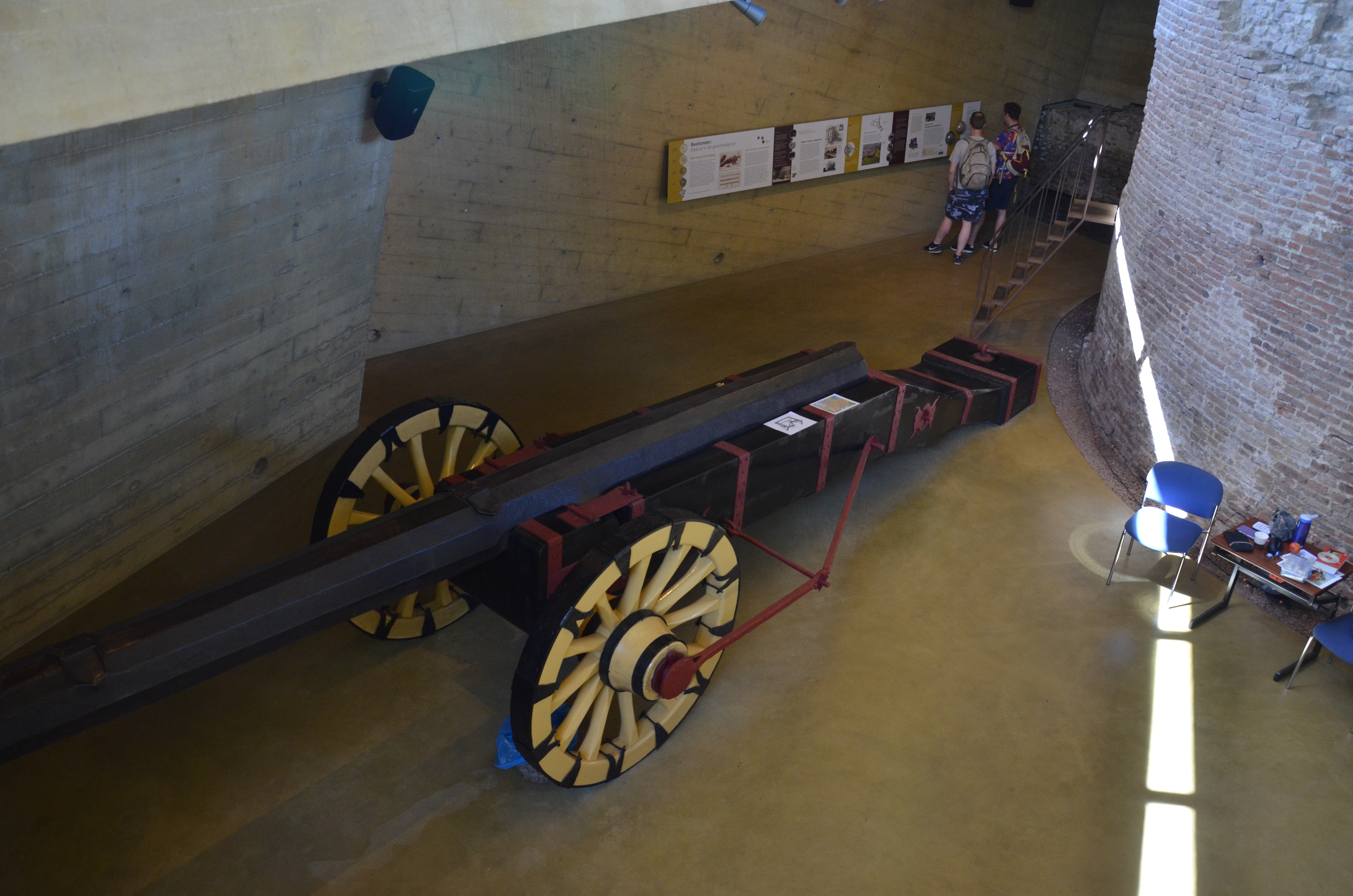
The wrought iron gun Stuerghewalt

The 'Stuerghewalt' or 'Boze Griet' long cannon, located inside the Bastionder, is a large wrought iron cannon. As such, it is unique in the Netherlands and very rare in Europe. Its unusual production method is visible in the many-sided shape of the barrel, a result of using wrought iron instead of cast iron. It dates from 1511-1512 when cast guns were only made from bronze. The first cast-iron cannon in Europe was made in 1543.

Stuerghewalt is the longest surviving medieval or early modern cannon in Europe.
