= De Toonzaal =

Music venue in the Netherlands

Coordinates: 51°41′9.23″N 5°18′13.09″E

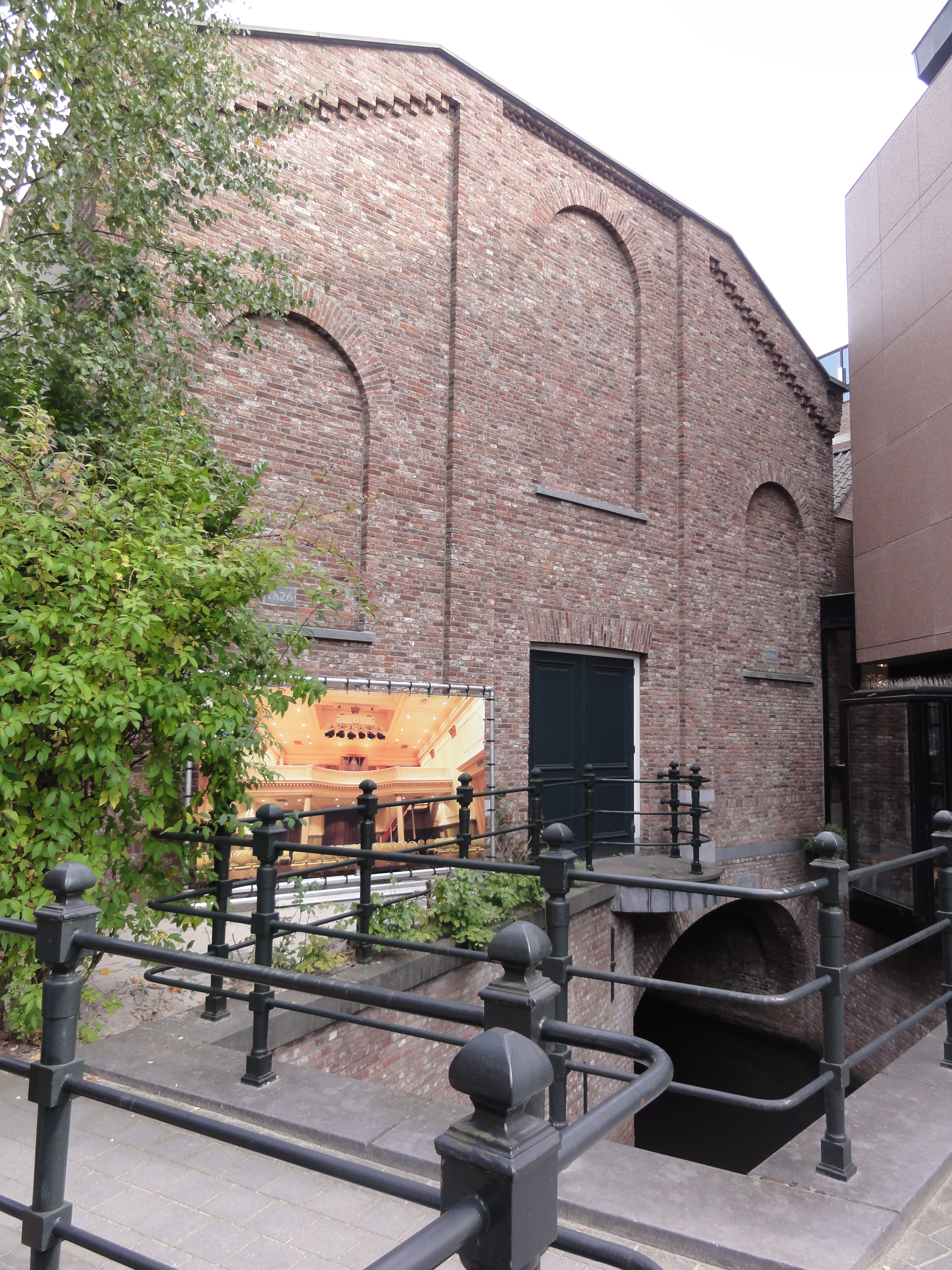
De Toonzaal

De Toonzaal is a music venue for chamber music, improvised music, and experimental music, situated in 's-Hertogenbosch, Netherlands, in a former synagogue. The music program is mainly focused on classical music and contemporary classical music, less on popular music.

The 's-Hertogenbosch Synagogue was built in 1823. During World War II a row of houses was built in front of the synagogue to block the view. Forty years later these houses were taken down to give the building its old appearance in the city. After World War II until the 1970s, the synagogue became less used.

== Toonzaal Studio ==
In October 2015 De Toonzaal opened an analog studio for education, recording and experimentation. The studio features a broad range of sound synthesis equipment (mainly made by Hewlett-Packard in the 1960s) suitable to create sound and music and record this analog and digital recording. The main installation is a voltage controlled vintage measurement equipment consisting out of tone generators, noise generators, oscillators, filters, sequencers and an analog computer. The studio is connected to the concert space and can relay the live performances as well as interact with them.

== CBK Toonzaalprijs ==
Yearly Muziekcentrum De Toonzaal in collaboration with Centrum Beeldende Kunst (CBK) gives away the CBK Toonzaalprijs award. The first this happened was in 2010 to Laura Hoek and in 2013 Shirley Welten.
