= 's-Hertogenbosch =

City in North Brabant, Netherlands

's-Hertogenbosch Den Bosch
- City and municipality
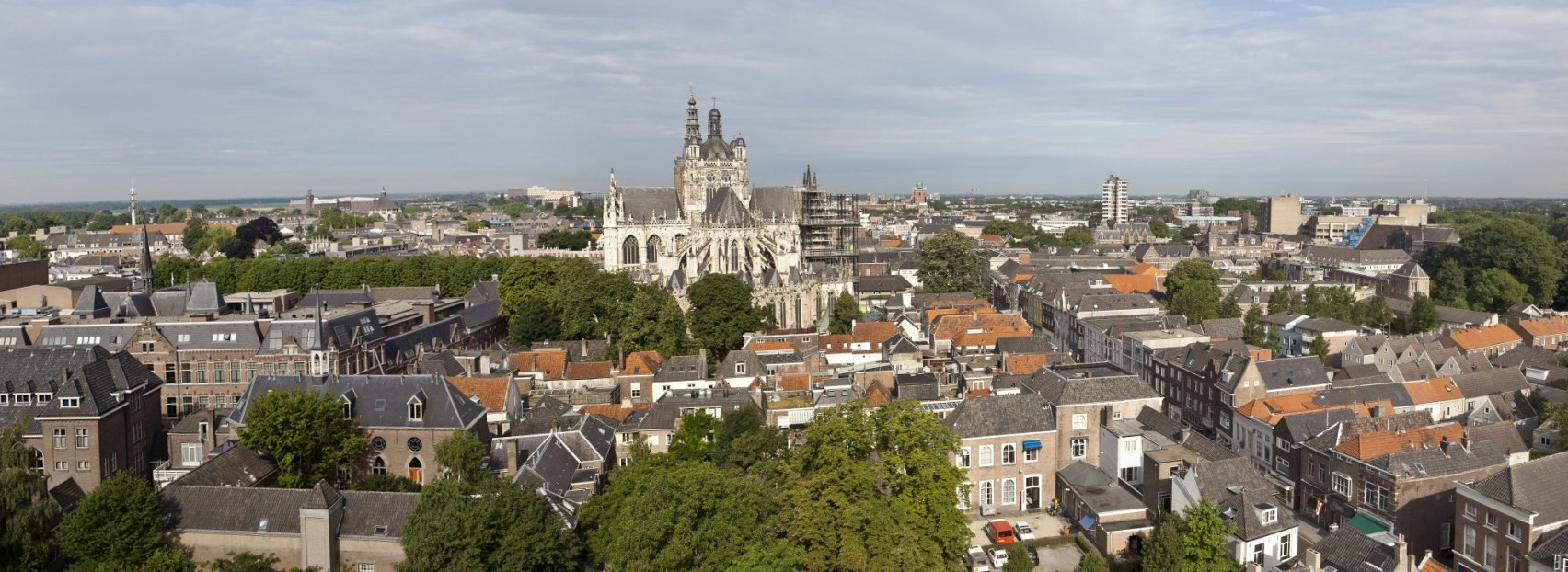
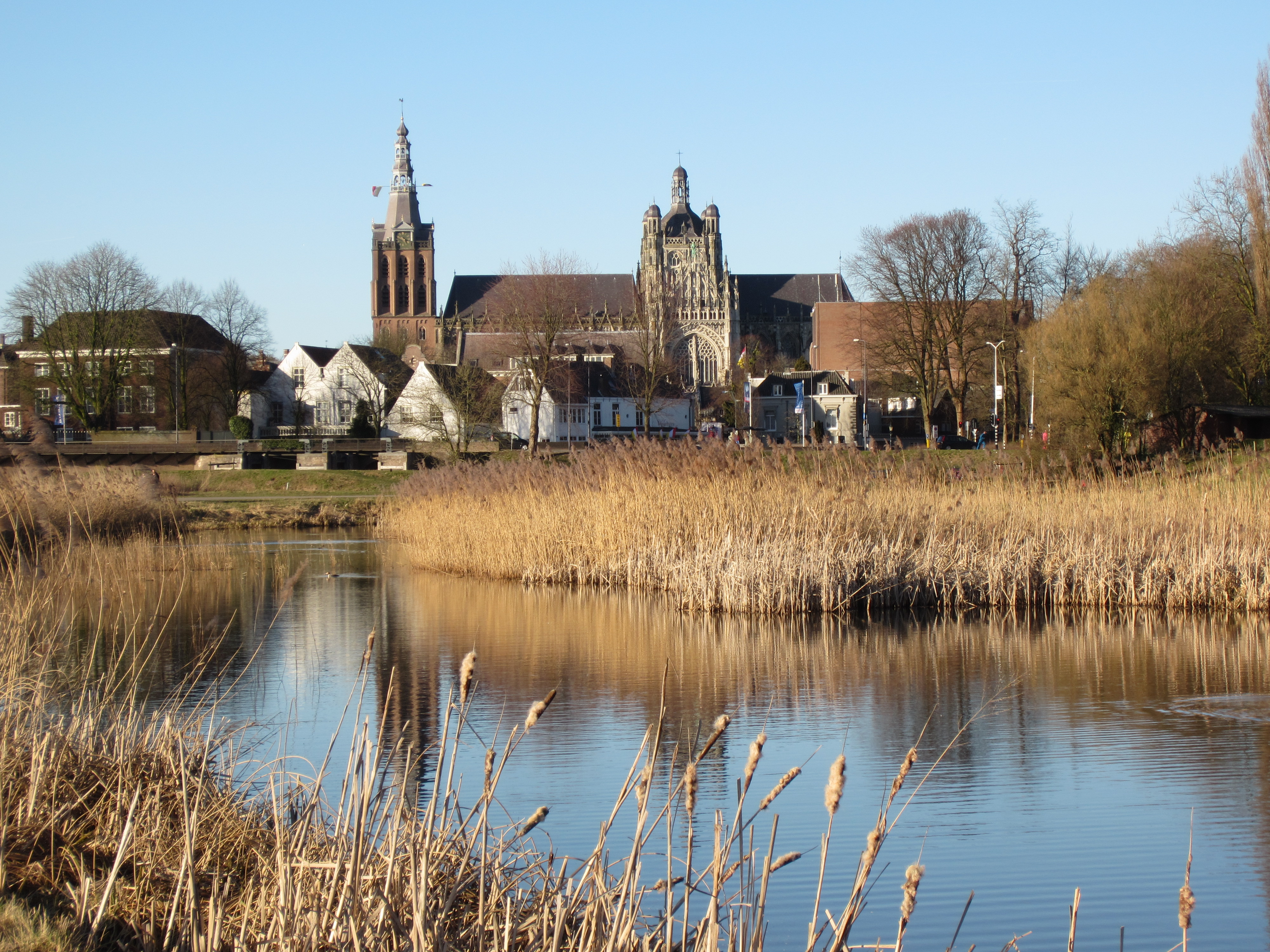
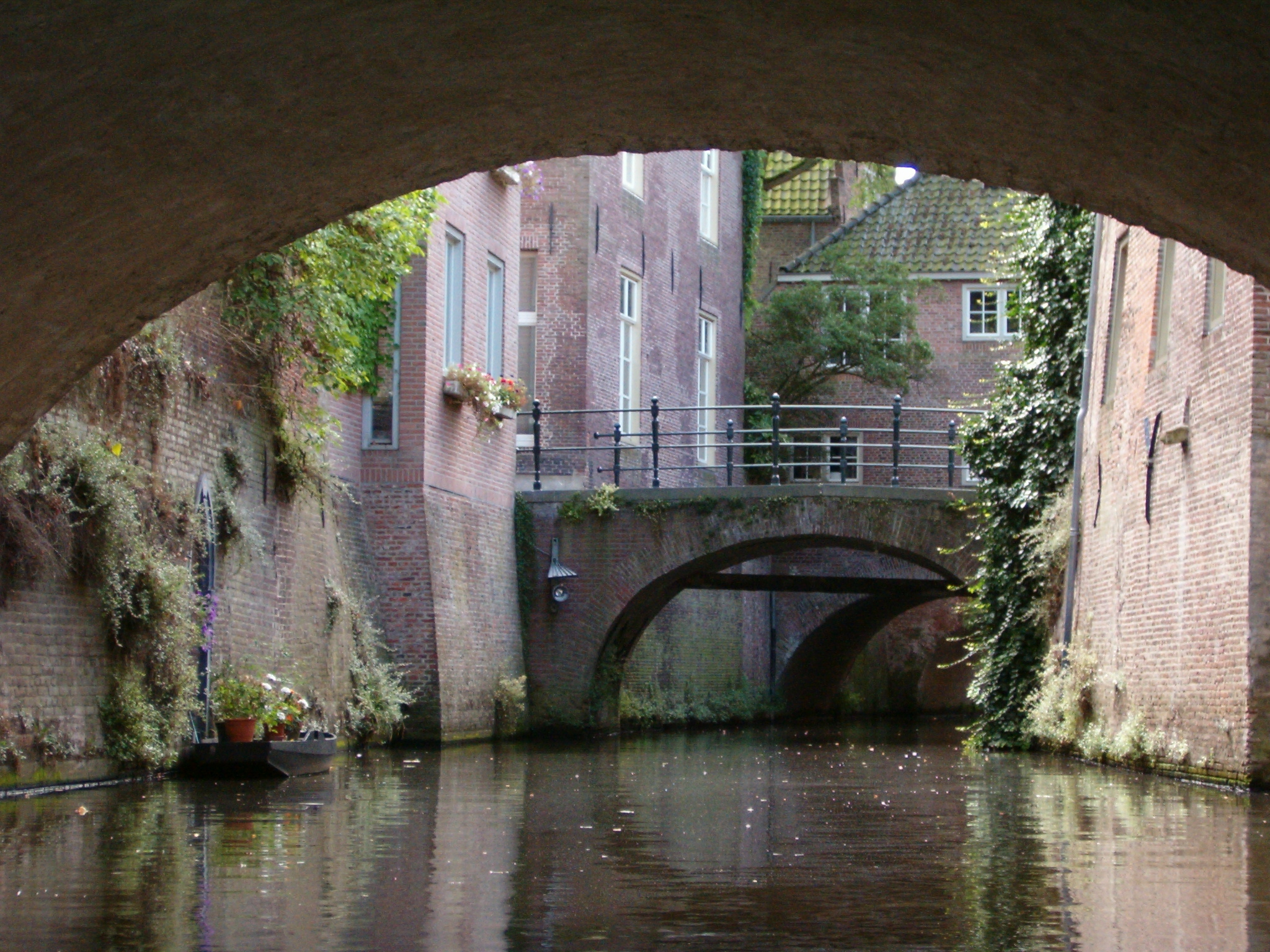
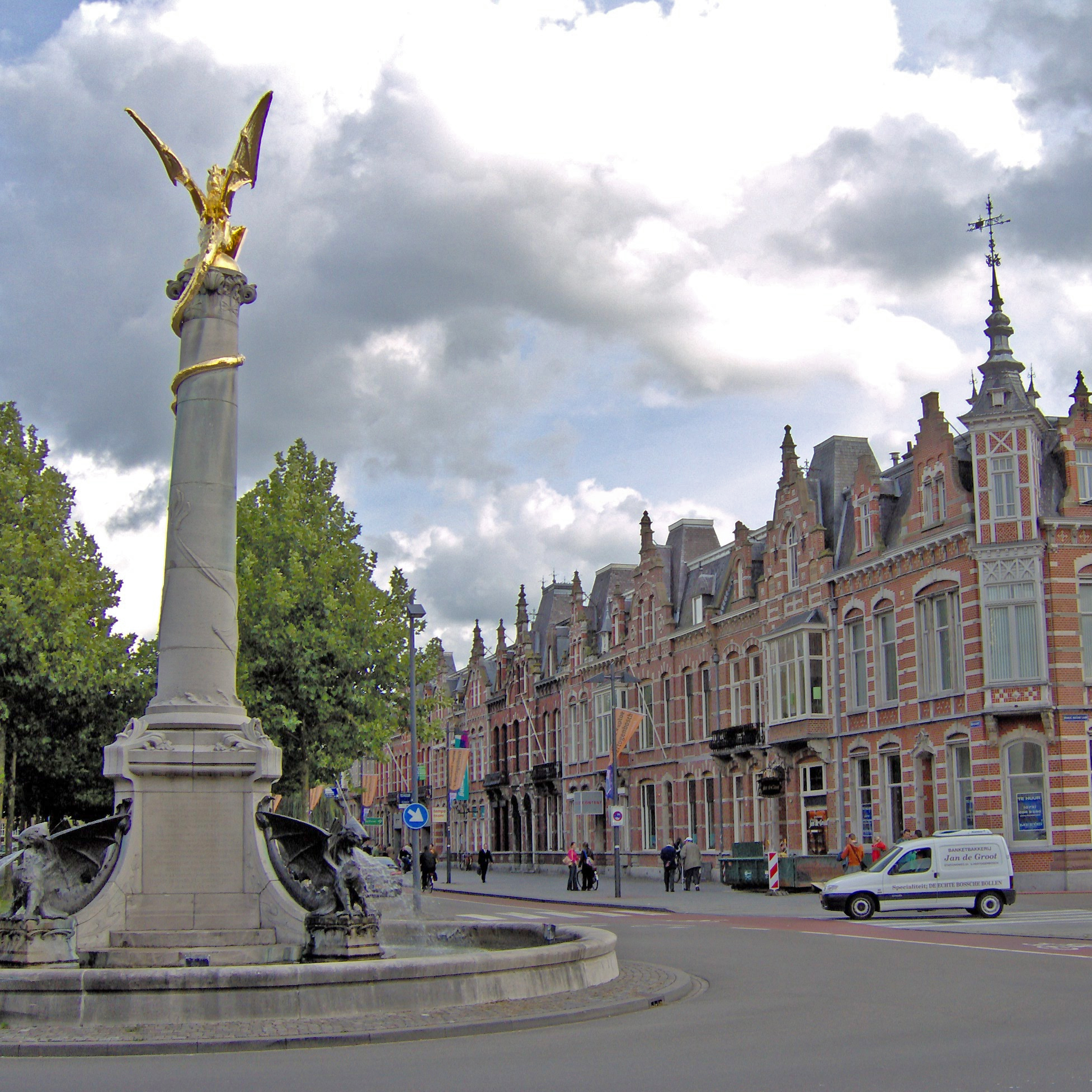
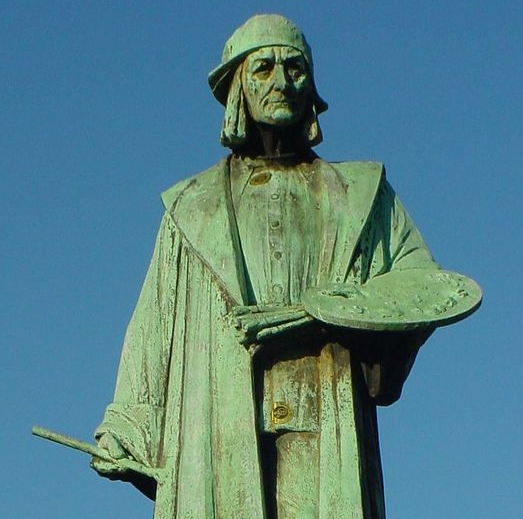
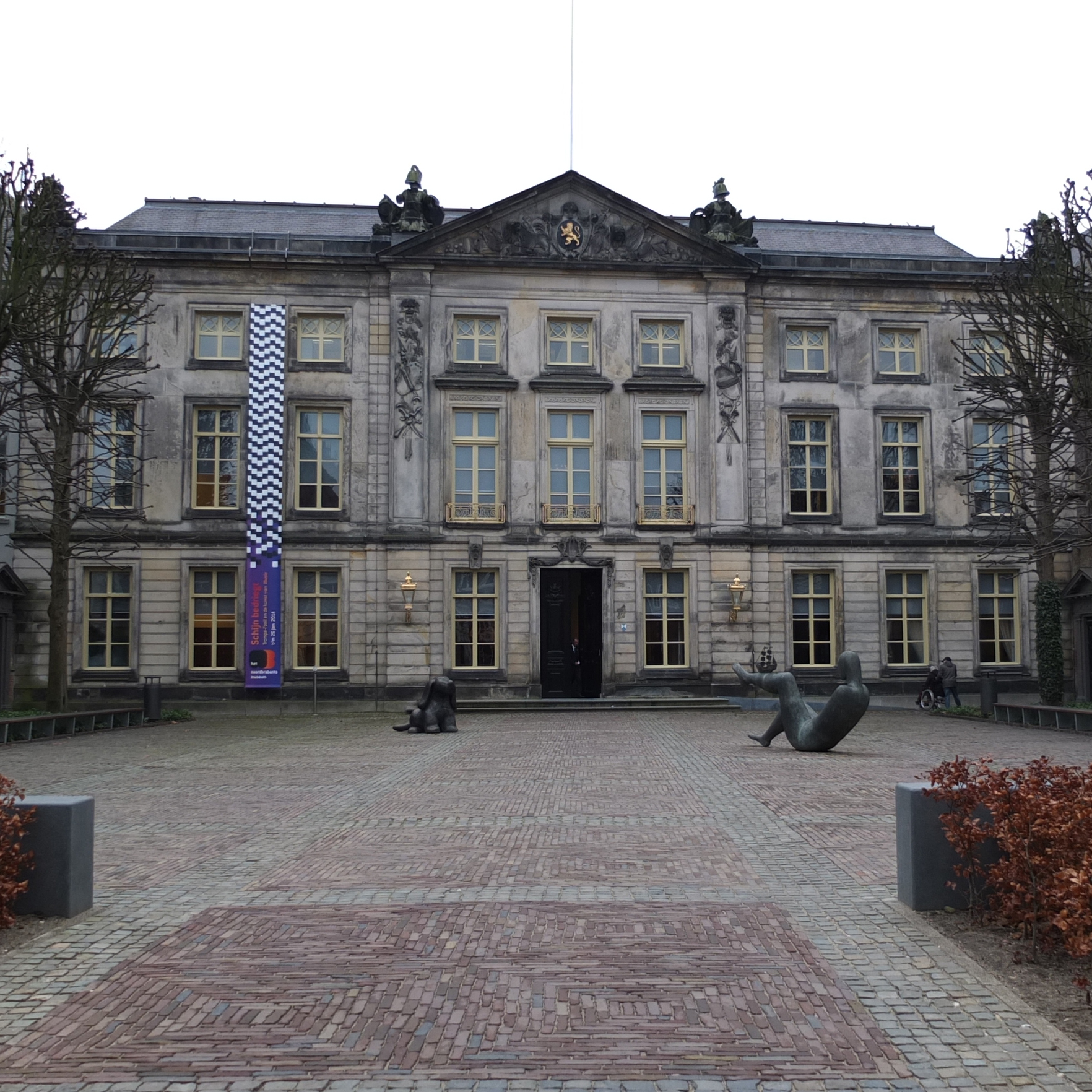
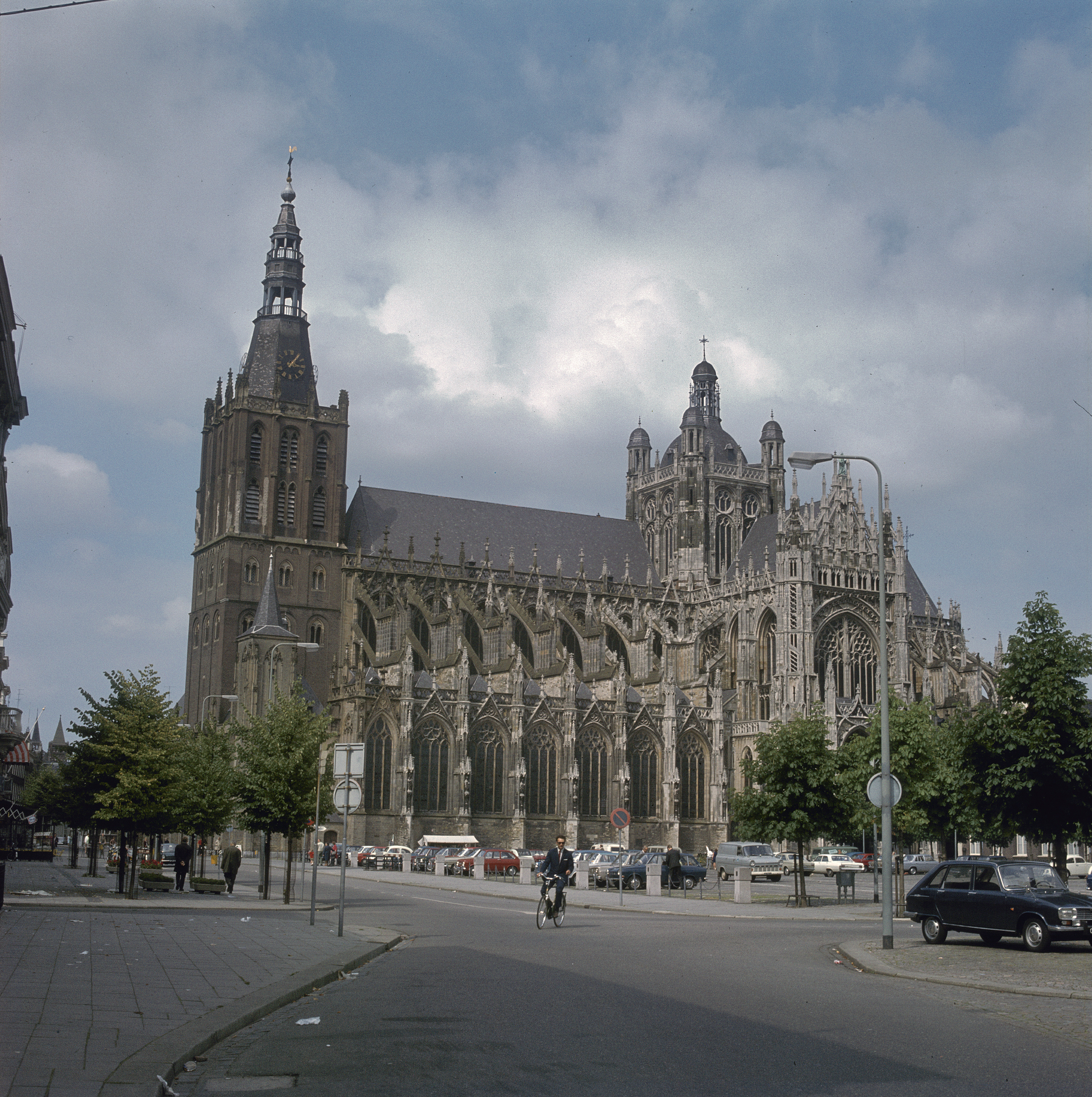
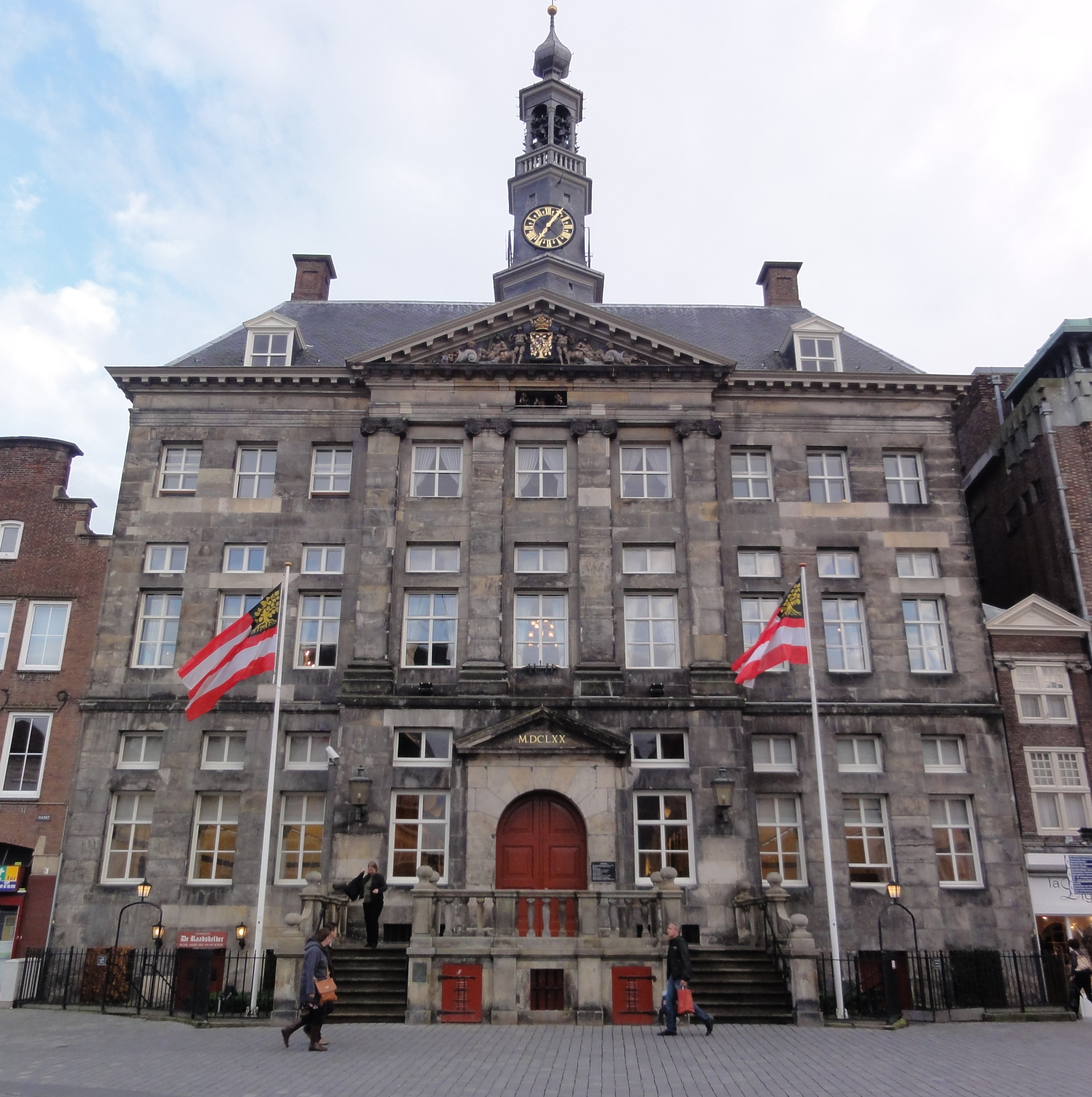
- View over the city centre The city seen from the Bossche Brook Binnendieze canals Dragon Fountain Hieronymus Bosch North Brabant Museum St. John's Cathedral City hall of 's-Hertogenbosch

- Flag Coat of arms Brandmark
- Interactive map of 's-Hertogenbosch
- Location within the Netherlands Location within Europe
- Coordinates: 51°41′N 5°18′E
- Country: Netherlands
- Province: North Brabant

Government
  - Body: Municipal council
  - Mayor: Jack Mikkers (VVD)

Area
  - Municipality: 117.81 km^{2} (45.49 sq mi)
  - Land: 109.99 km^{2} (42.47 sq mi)
  - Water: 7.82 km^{2} (3.02 sq mi)
- Elevation: 6 m (20 ft)

Population (Municipality, May 2022; Urban and Metro, May 2014) (Note: Metropolitan region Waalboss: 143,733 – 's-Hertogenbosch; 84,954 – Oss; 46,498 – Waalwijk; 43,165 – Heusden; 25,638 – Vught; 11,242 – Maasdonk; + 355,230)
  - Municipality: 160,783
  - Density: 1,414/km^{2} (3,660/sq mi)
  - Urban: 169,714
  - Metro: 198,000
  - Metro region: 355,230
  - Brabant CMSA: 1,932,055
- Demonym: Bosschenaar
- Time zone: UTC+1 (CET)
  - Summer (DST): UTC+2 (CEST)
- Postcode: 5200–5249
- Area code: 073
- Website: s-hertogenbosch.nl

's-Hertogenbosch (Dutch: [ˌsɛrtoːɣə(m)ˈbɔs]), (Note: French: Bois-le-Duc [bwɑ l(ə) dyk]; German: Herzogenbusch [ˌhɛʁtsoːɡn̩ˈbʊʃ].) colloquially known as Den Bosch (pronounced [dɛm ˈbɔs]), is a city and municipality in the Netherlands with a population of 160,783. It is the capital of the province of North Brabant and its fourth largest city by population. The city is directly south of the Maas river and near the Waal.

== History ==
The city's official name is a contraction of the (archaic) Dutch des Hertogen bosch ('the forest of the duke'). The duke in question was Henry I, Duke of Brabant, whose family had owned a large estate at nearby Orthen for at least four centuries. He founded a new town located on some forested dunes in the middle of a marsh. At age 26, he granted 's-Hertogenbosch city rights and the corresponding trade privileges in 1185. This is the traditional date given by later chroniclers; the first mention in contemporaneous sources is 1196. The original charter has been lost. His reason for founding the city was to protect his own interests against encroachment from Gelre and Holland; from its first days, he conceived of the city as a fortress. It was destroyed in 1203 in a joint expedition of Gelre and Holland, but was soon rebuilt. Some remnants of the original city walls remain.

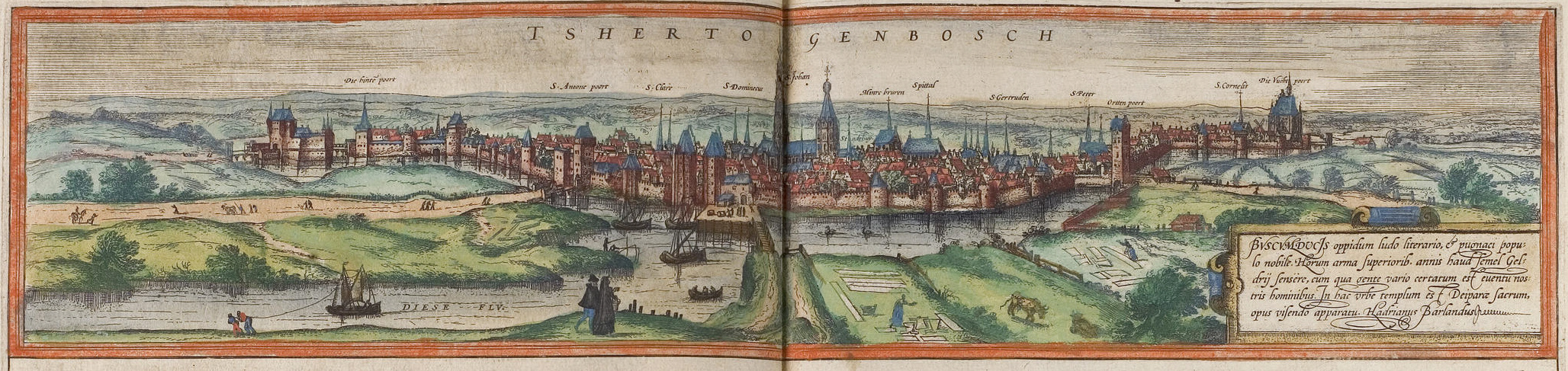
's-Hertogenbosch in the 16th century

In the late 14th century, a much larger wall was erected to protect the greatly expanded settled area. Artificial waterways were dug to serve as a city moat, through which the rivers Dommel and Aa were diverted. 's-Hertogenbosch became the birthplace and home of northern Renaissance painter Hieronymus Bosch.

Until 1520, the city flourished, becoming the second largest population centre in the territory of the present Netherlands, after Utrecht. The city was also a center of music, and composers, such as Jheronimus Clibano, received their training at its churches. Others held positions there: Matthaeus Pipelare was musical director at the Confraternity of Our Lady; and renowned Habsburg copyist and composer Pierre Alamire did much of his work at 's-Hertogenbosch.

=== Eighty Years' War ===
The wars of the Reformation changed the course of the city's history. It became an independent bishopric. During the Eighty Years' War, the city took the side of the Habsburg (Catholic) authorities and thwarted a Calvinist coup. It was besieged several times by Prince Maurice of Orange, stadtholder of most of the Dutch Republic, who wanted to bring 's-Hertogenbosch under the rule of the rebel United Provinces. The city was successfully defended against Prince Maurice in 1601 and again in 1603, but it eventually fell in the 1629 siege led by his brother Frederick Henry.

=== Thirty Years' War ===
Historical population
Year	Pop.	±% p.a.
1374	14,526	—
1438	12,973	−0.18%
1464	10,507	−0.81%
1473	10,579	+0.08%
1480	13,185	+3.20%
1496	15,552	+1.04%
1526	18,571	+0.59%
1560	17,500	−0.17%
1600	18,000	+0.07%
1665	9,000	−1.06%
1747	12,574	+0.41%
1795	12,841	+0.04%
Source: Lourens & Lucassen 1997, pp. 45–46

In the years of Truce, before the renewed fighting after 1618, the fortifications were greatly expanded. The surrounding marshes made a siege of the conventional type impossible, and the fortress, deemed impregnable, was nicknamed moerasdraak, or the Swamp Dragon. The town was nevertheless finally conquered by Frederik Hendrik of Orange in 1629 in a typically Dutch stratagem: he diverted the rivers Dommel and Aa, created a polder by constructing a forty-kilometre (25 mile) dyke and then pumped out the water by mills. After a siege of three months, the city had to surrender—an enormous blow to Habsburg geo-political strategy during the Thirty Years' War. This surrender cut the town off from the rest of the duchy and the area was treated by the Republic as an occupation zone without political liberties (see also Generality Lands).

=== Louis XIV to Bonaparte ===
After the Peace of Westphalia, the fortifications were again expanded. In 1672, the Dutch rampjaar, the city held against the army of Louis XIV of France. In 1794 French revolutionary troops under the command of Charles Pichegru attacked the city. It was only weakly defended, and fell after a short siege. Pichegru then crossed the rivers and put an end to the Dutch Republic.

Under the new Batavian Republic, established in 1795, both Catholics and Brabanders at last gained equal rights. From 1806, the city became part of the Kingdom of Holland and from 1810, it was incorporated into the First French Empire. It was captured by the Prussians in 1814.

=== Kingdom of the Netherlands ===
The next year, 1815, when the United Kingdom of the Netherlands was established, it became the capital of North Brabant. Many newer and more modern fortresses were created in the vicinity of the city. A new canal was built, the 'Zuid-Willemsvaart', which gave the city an economic impulse. Trade, manufacturing and industry grew. Until 1878, it was forbidden to build outside the ramparts. That led to overcrowding and the highest infant mortality in the kingdom.

At the end of the 19th century, the very conservative city government prevented industrial investment to avoid an increase in the number of workers and the establishment of educational institutions: students were regarded as disorderly. As a result, the relative importance of the city diminished.

=== World War II and after ===
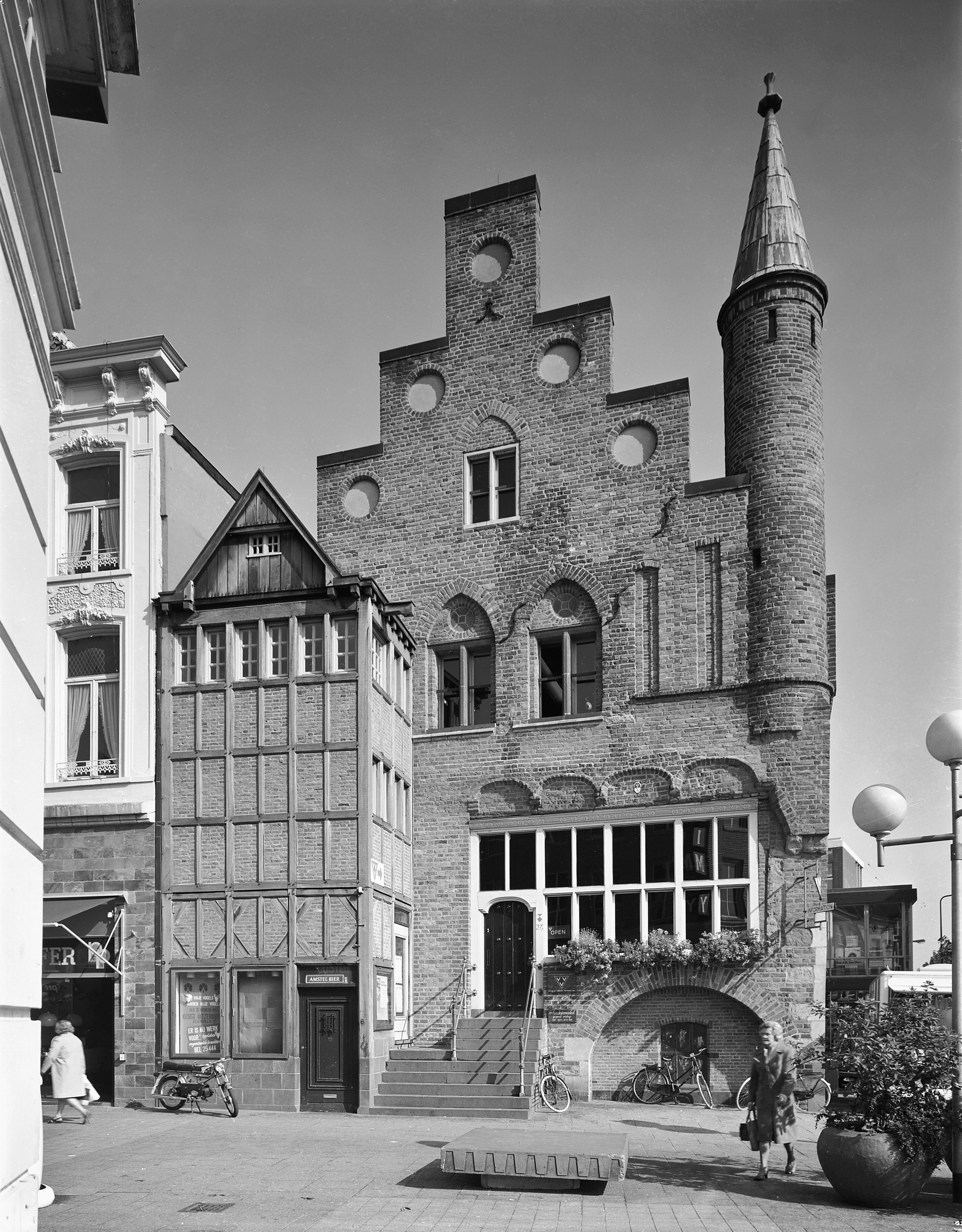
De Moriaan

One of the few official Nazi concentration camp complexes in Western Europe outside Germany and Austria was named after 's-Hertogenbosch. It operated from January 1943, to September 1944 and was known to the Germans as Herzogenbusch (see List of subcamps of Herzogenbusch). About 30,000 inmates were interned in the complex during this time, of whom about 12,000 were Jews. In the Netherlands, this camp is known as 'Kamp Vught', because the concentration camp was actually located at a heath near Vught, a village a few kilometres south of 's-Hertogenbosch.

The city was occupied by German forces during World War II from 1940 to 1944. The railway station was bombed by planes of the Royal Air Force on 16 September 1944. The city was liberated between 24 and 27 October 1944 during Operation Pheasant by British soldiers of Major-General Robert Knox Ross's 53rd (Welsh) Infantry Division following the victory of the 1st Battalion, East Lancashire Regiment, of 158th Infantry Brigade over the enemy on 23–24 October.

After the war, 's-Hertogenbosch was modernized, like many other cities in the Netherlands. It was possible that it was only the geography that shielded the old town from rigorous reconstruction in those early years. Just in time, the pendulum swung back to protecting the history of the city. In 1956, the council wanted to demolish the Moriaan, the oldest brick building in the Netherlands, to give traffic better access to the market square. The permit was refused by the government and instead the building was restored, starting in 1963. Later, city councils became much more aware of the value of historic buildings and from about the turn of the millennium, the historic fortifications are also given much attention by the authorities.

== Geography ==
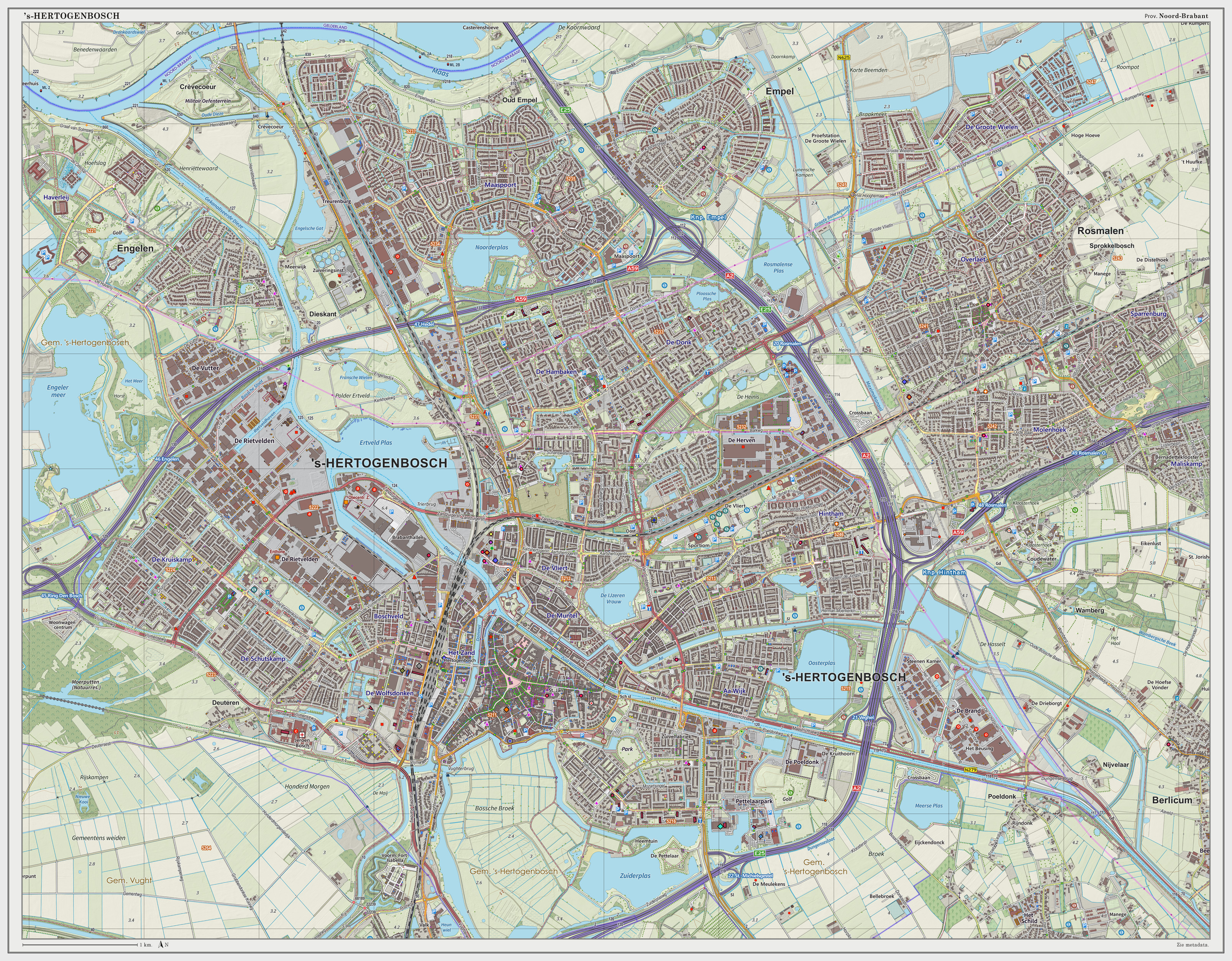
Dutch Topographic map of 's-Hertogenbosch, as of March 2014

=== Population centres ===
The population centres in the municipality are: Bokhoven, Crevecoeur, Deuteren (former village), Dieskant, Empel, Engelen, Gewande, 's-Hertogenbosch, Hintham, Kruisstraat, Maliskamp, Meerwijk, Orthen (former village), Oud-Empel, and Rosmalen.

=== Climate ===
Climate in this area has mild differences between highs and lows, and there is adequate rainfall year-round. The Köppen Climate Classification subtype for this climate is "Cfb" (Marine West Coast Climate/Oceanic climate).

Climate data for Gemert-Bakel
Month	Jan	Feb	Mar	Apr	May	Jun	Jul	Aug	Sep	Oct	Nov	Dec	Year
Mean daily maximum °C (°F)	4 (39)	4 (39)	9 (49)	13 (56)	18 (64)	21 (69)	22 (72)	22 (71)	19 (66)	14 (57)	8 (47)	6 (43)	13 (56)
Mean daily minimum °C (°F)	−1 (31)	−2 (29)	2 (35)	4 (39)	7 (45)	10 (50)	13 (55)	12 (54)	10 (50)	7 (44)	3 (38)	2 (36)	6 (42)
Average precipitation mm (inches)	69 (2.7)	51 (2)	79 (3.1)	30 (1.2)	48 (1.9)	58 (2.3)	89 (3.5)	81 (3.2)	71 (2.8)	51 (2)	48 (1.9)	61 (2.4)	730 (28.9)
Average precipitation days	8.8	6.3	5.8	4	6	6.7	7.8	8.7	8.2	7	5.4	8.8	83.5
Source: Weatherbase

== Economy ==
The city of 's-Hertogenbosch has become a center of industry, education, administration and culture. It is currently the fourth city of North Brabant. It is home to many national and international businesses such as Heineken, Epic, Tyco International, SAP and many others. The Jeroen Bosch Hospital is the biggest employer in the area, with over 4,000 employees.

== Culture ==
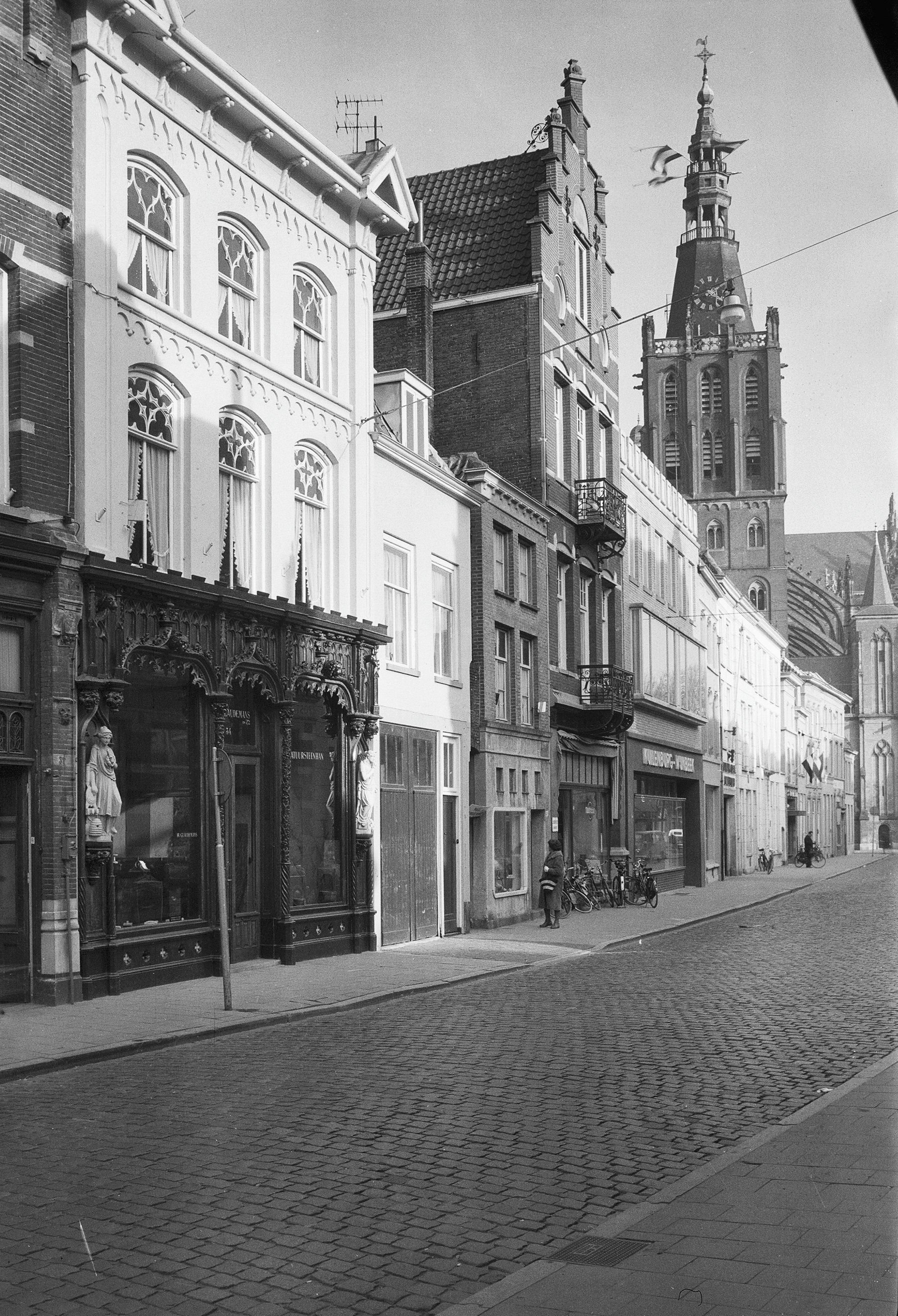
Typical street in 's-Hertogenbosch

's-Hertogenbosch is home to a variety of events such as the theatre festival Boulevard, Jazz in Duketown, and hip hop in duketown, the start of the Tour de France (1996), Tour Feminin (1997), the International Vocal Competition, November Music (a contemporary music festival) and the UNICEF Open (formerly the Ordina Open) grass court tennis tournament (in the nearby town of Rosmalen). There are also over 350 restaurants, pubs and cafés to be found in the city.

's-Hertogenbosch is also home to the European Ceramic Work Centre. This is a juried international ceramic residency where they invite artists, designers and architects from around to the world to explore the medium of Ceramics. This program was initially started in 1991 and continues to this day.

The city has its own food speciality, the Bossche Bol—effectively a giant profiterole, somewhat larger than a tennis ball, which is filled with whipped cream and coated with chocolate.

The spoken language is Maaslands (the variant spoken in 's-Hertogenbosch is called Bosch which is placed among the Central North Brabantian dialects, although other classification systems also describe it as East Brabantian), which is very similar to colloquial Dutch.

De Toonzaal is a music venue for chamber music, improvised music, and experimental music. For popular music there is the venue W2 (or Willem II).

=== Museums ===
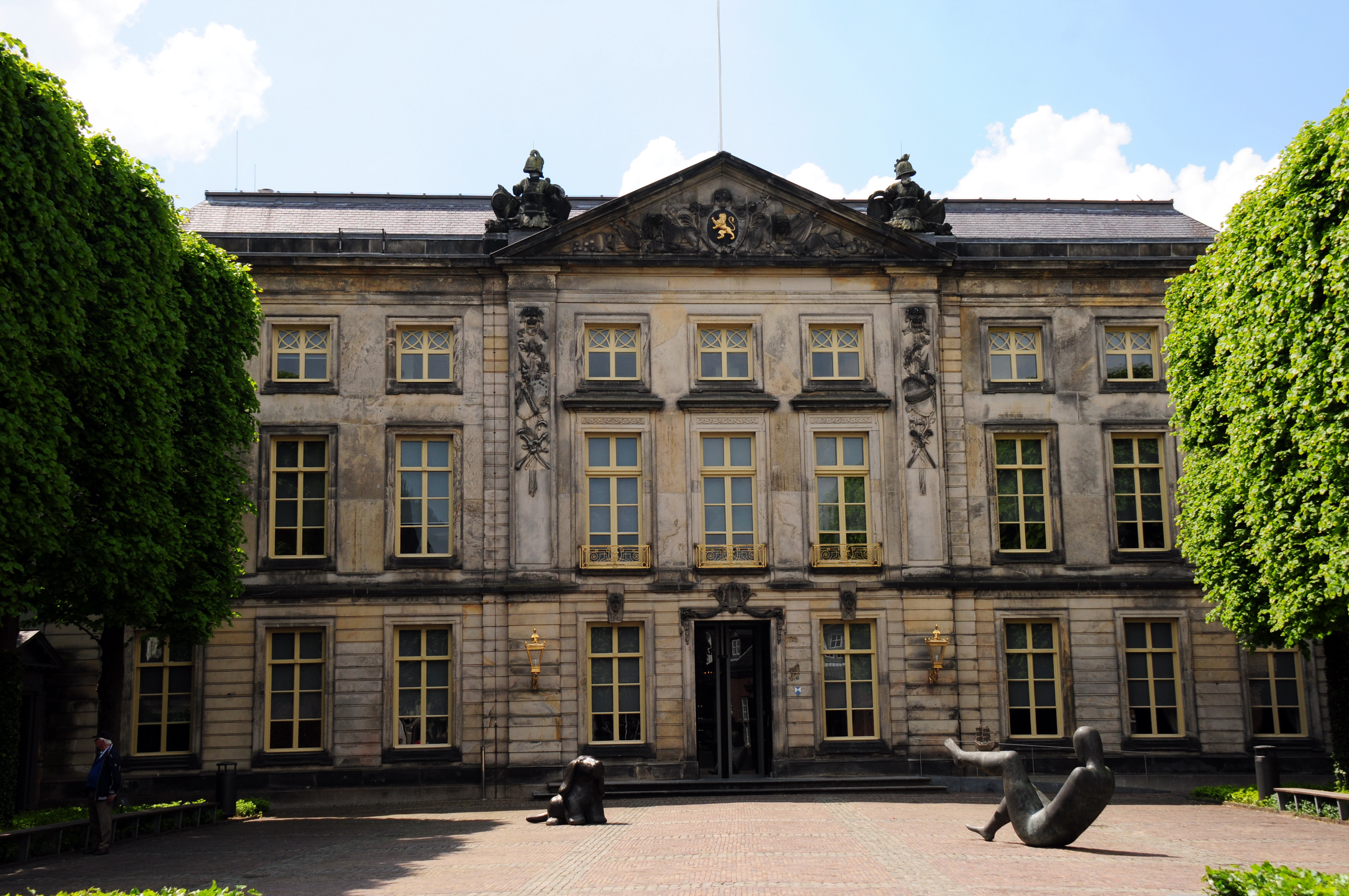
Noordbrabants Museum

The Noordbrabants Museum is a provincial museum with an overview of works that Vincent van Gogh made in Brabant. The Design Museum Den Bosch is a modern art museum. The Jheronimus Bosch Art Center, is dedicated to the work of Hieronymus Bosch. Other museums include the Swan Brothers' House and Museum Slager. Also the National (Dutch) Carnavalsmuseum Oeteldonks gemintemuzejum is located in the city. In the near future a new museum will be opened about the fortresses of the town and in general in Europe. The house where the famous painter Hieronymus produced his paintings can be visited on the market square.

=== Carnival celebrations ===
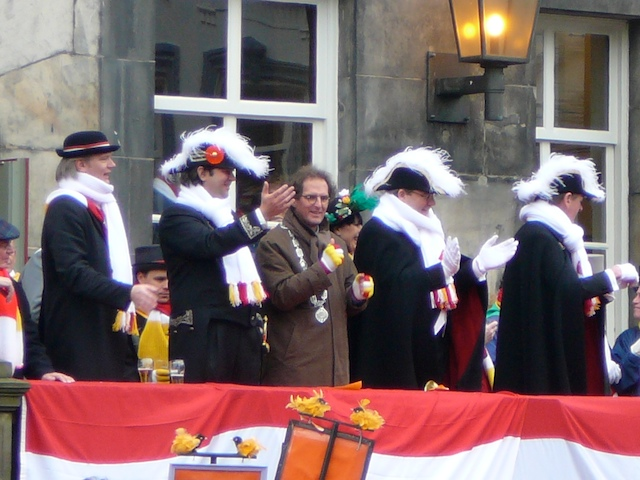
Mayor Ton Rombouts, the Mayor of Oeteldonk, and the prince at City Hall in 2007

's-Hertogenbosch has a strong carnival tradition. In its current form the story and symbolism dates from 1881 to 1883. In these years some citizens created the legend of "Oeteldonk", whereby the city was renamed to Oeteldonk for the three day carnival. "Donk" is a reference to a dry place in the marsh. The frog is widely used as a symbol during the 's-Hertogenbosch Carnival. It is also a symbol of the Oeteldonk marsh. It was also a remark aimed at Bishop Godschalk from Den Dungen, where 'Van den Oetelaar' was a common family name. He had wanted to forbid the traditional festivities of Shrove Tuesday that often led to excesses.

Oeteldonk is a village and therefore every inhabitant is a farmer or a 'durske' (a girl or young woman), eliminating class differences. The village is headed by the Mayor "Peer vaan den Muggenheuvel tot den Bobberd". Each year the mayor of 's-Hertogenbosch hands over his authority to the Mayor of Oeteldonk. On Sunday at 11:11 AM the Mayor of Oeteldonk then receives Prince Carnaval "Prince Amadeiro XXVI" at Oeteldonk central station. From there a parade of all carnival clubs escorts the company to the town hall.

The citizens of 's-Hertogenbosch wear traditional outfits throughout these days. A so-called boerenkiel is worn and every year patches are designed according to that years theme which can then be stitched onto the outfit. The boerenkiel is often combined with a traditional farmers bandana and a long scarf in the colors of Oeteldonk. The tradition of the Boerenkiel and / or Bandana is very different from the carnival traditions in the rest of the Netherlands. Other aspects like the parade, the temporary name and the temporary flag (for Oeteldonk red, white and yellow) are very similar.

== Attractions ==
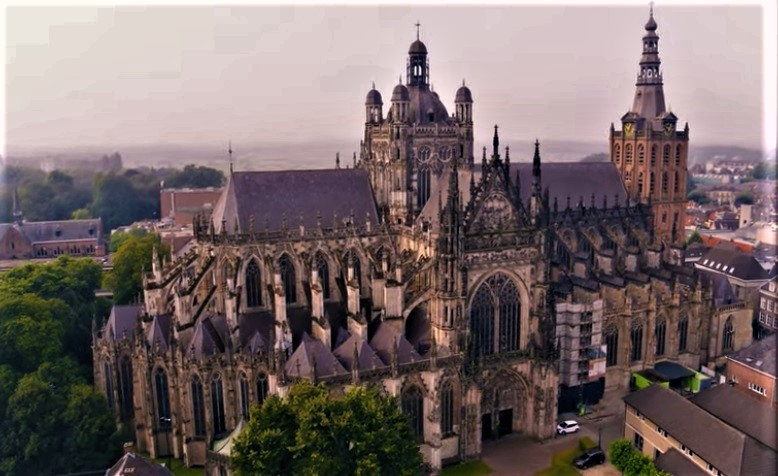
Saint John's Cathedral

's-Hertogenbosch was founded as a fortified city and that heritage can still be seen today. After World War II, plans were made to modernise the old city, by filling in the canals, removing or modifying some ramparts and redeveloping historic neighbourhoods. Before these plans could come to effect, the central government declared the city a protected townscape. Most historic elements have been preserved. In contrast to cities like Rotterdam, 's-Hertogenbosch also survived the Second World War relatively unscathed. Much of its historic heritage remains intact, and today there are always renovations going on in the city to preserve the many old buildings, fortifications, churches and statues for later generations.

=== City center ===
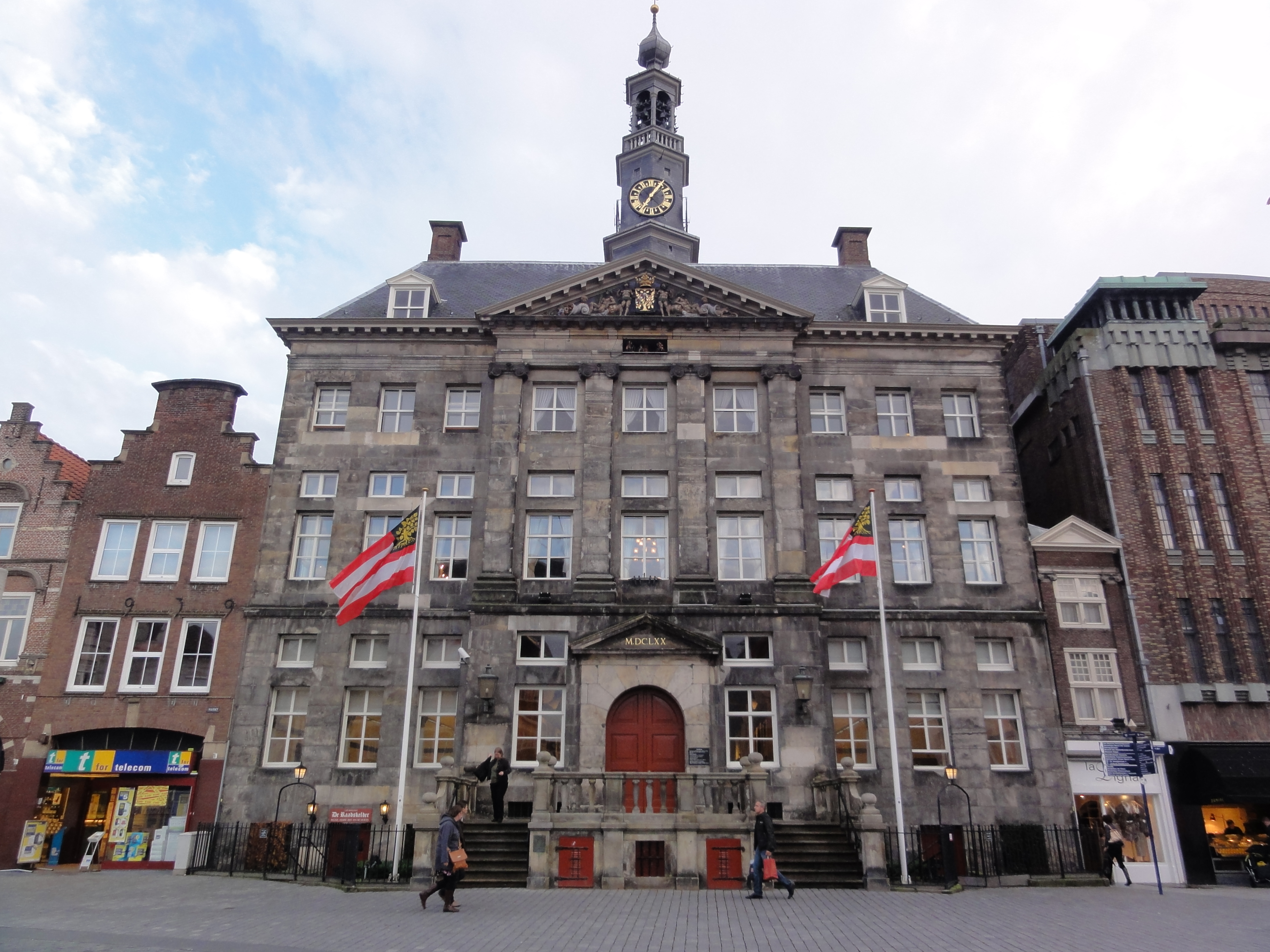
City Hall of 's-Hertogenbosch

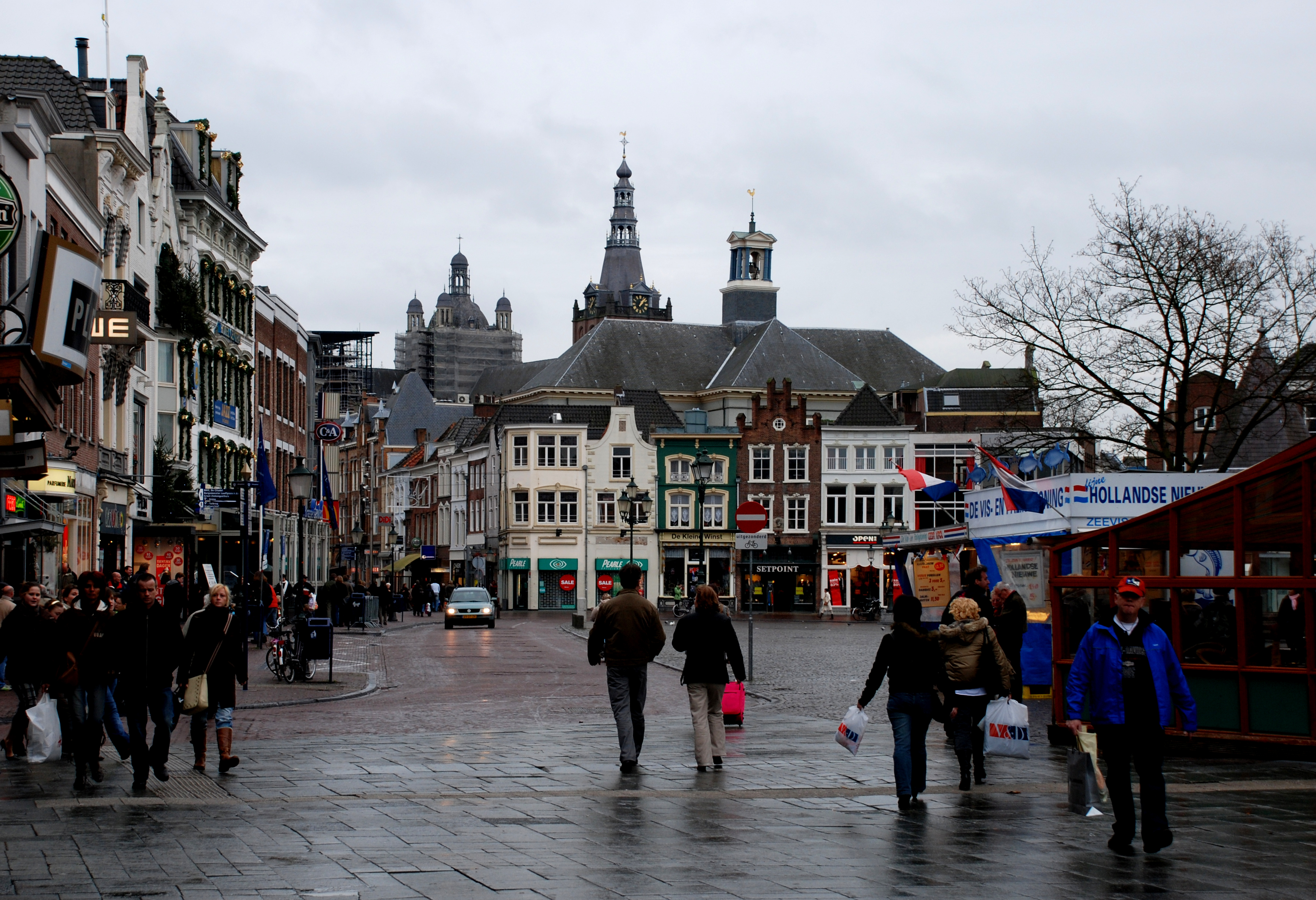
Market square

The city center has a cosy atmosphere because of the almost continuous ramparts that still surround it. It has been molded by the multiple rivers that convene on 's-Hertogenbosch, giving the center its strange street plan so different from the usual grid plan where streets meet at right angles. The center is dominated by Saint John's Cathedral (Sint-Janskathedraal in Dutch), which dates from c. 1220 and is best known for its Brabantine Gothic design and the many sculptures of craftsmen that are sitting on almost every arc and rim along the outside of the cathedral. In 2010 an extensive restoration was completed, undoing the damage of many years of wear-and-tear and acid rain.

On the central square is the oldest remaining brick house of the Netherlands, 'de Moriaan', which was built at the beginning of the 13th century. In the 1960s, de Moriaan was renovated to its former glory based on a famous 16th-century Dutch painting called 'De Lakenmarkt van 's-Hertogenbosch' ('The fabric market of 's-Hertogenbosch'). The town hall is an original 14th-century Gothic building. After the town was conquered by the Dutch Republic in 1629, it received a new facade in the style of Dutch Baroque architecture. It showcased the authority of the new masters, just like the new town hall in Maastricht would.

Hidden below the old city is a canal network called the Binnendieze, which once spanned 22 km (14 mi). It started out as a regular river, the Dommel, running through the city in medieval times. Due to a lack of space in the city, people started building their houses and roads over the river. Later, the Binnendieze functioned as a sewer and fell into disrepair. In recent decades, the remaining sixth part of the old waterway system has been renovated, and it is possible to take several guided subterranean boat trips through it.

=== Fortifications ===
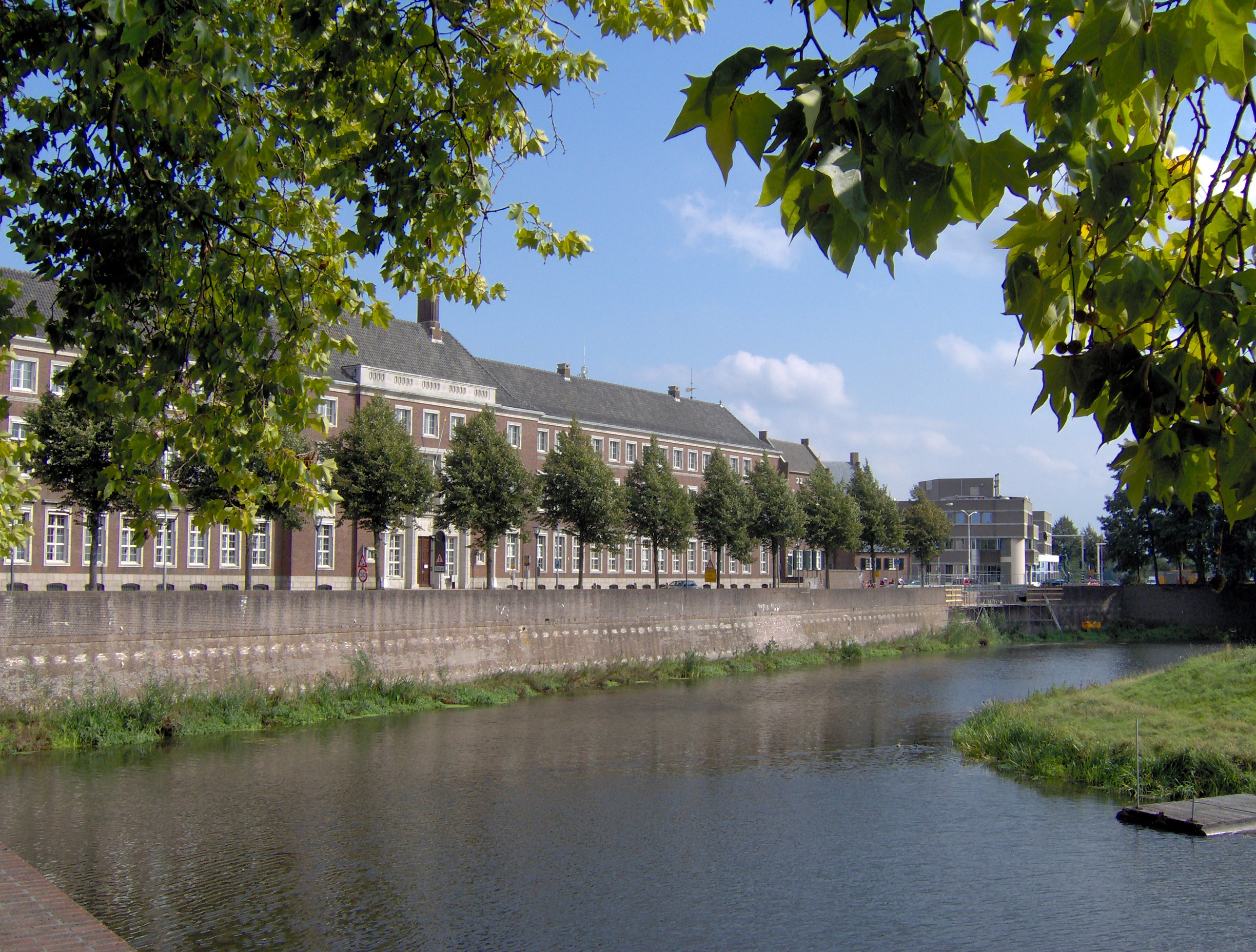
City rampart

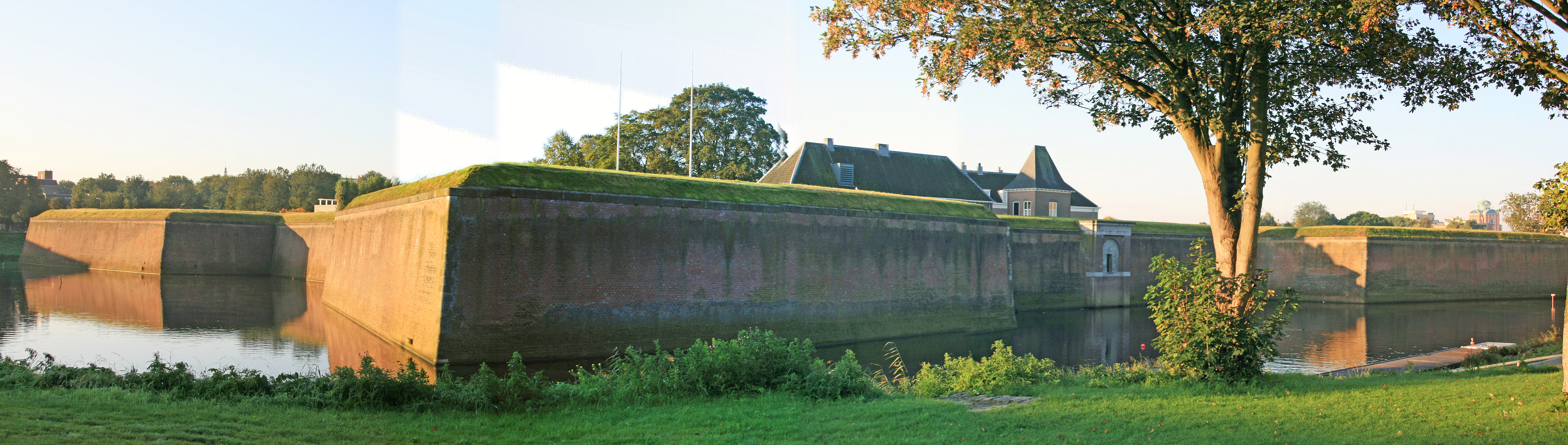
Citadel of 's-Hertogenbosch

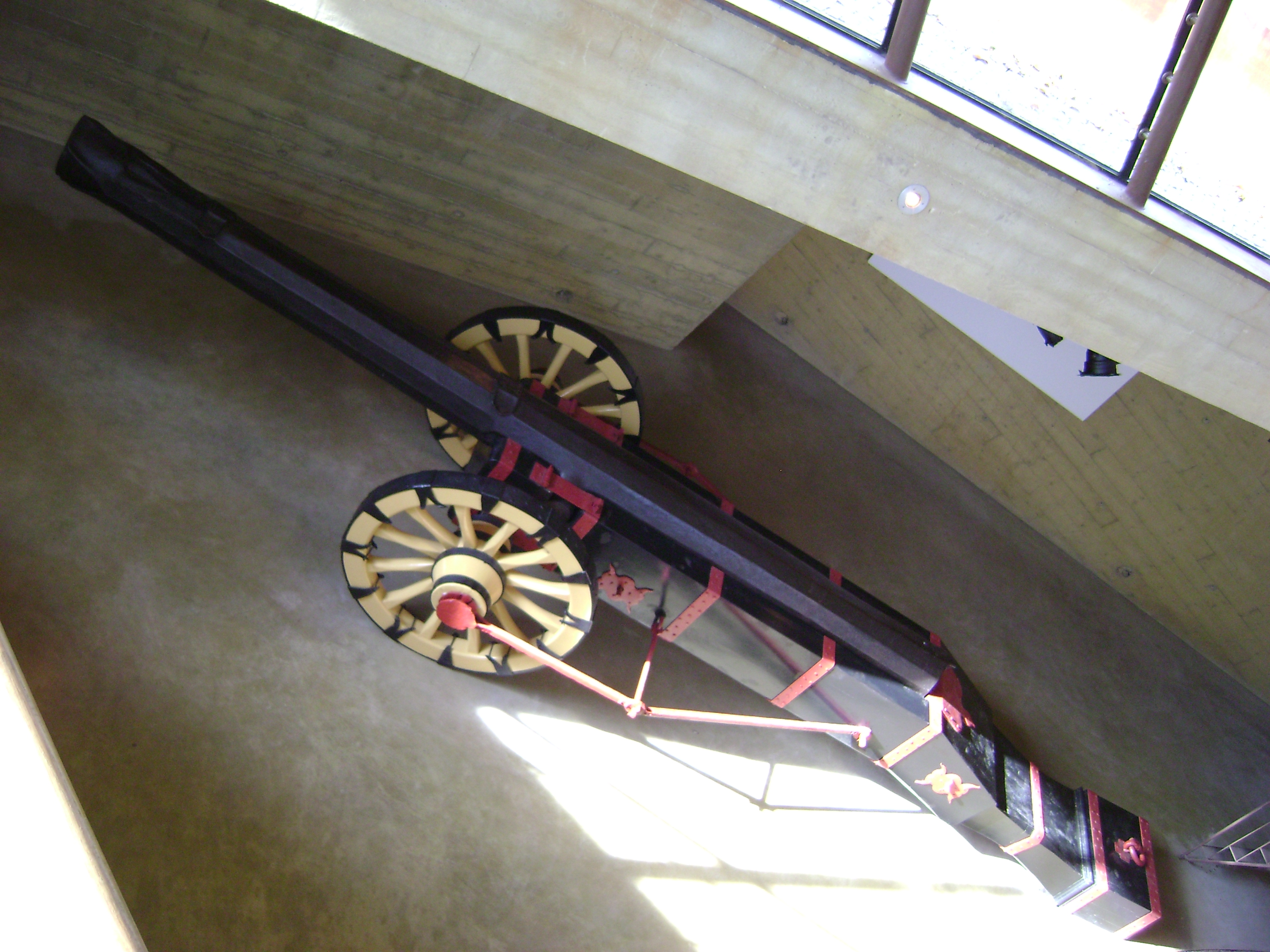
Boze Griet, a forged cannon from 1510 in the Bastionder

's-Hertogenbosch has an extensive and almost complete fifteenth-to-seventeenth-century city fortification. It was made to profit from the city's strong defensive position, lying on a sandy hill in the center of a large swamp fed by many rivers. This also caused the main ramparts to be preserved, because they were crucial in keeping out the water. In 2004 the city was awarded the title European Fortress City of the year. In the years that followed it restored many of the city defenses to much of their old glory.

Apart from small sections of medieval walls, the main structure of the fortification is a late-medieval (fifteenth-century) wall. The upper sections were removed when cannon became more powerful, and polygonal bastions were added, some after the conquest by the republic. Most of these have not been restored to their original height, but do maintain their brick walls. The citadel in the north west of the city does retain its original height. Around the city itself many other fortresses can still be seen.

In the north east of the old city, the hexagonal gunpowder magazine, called Kruithuis is located close to the citadel. It is one of only a handful that still exist in the Netherlands, and was built when the city was still part of the Spanish Netherlands. It is planned to become the museum of fortress 's-Hertogenbosch. One of the bastions of the fortress now houses the mini museum Bastionder. It has been dug out in a bastion of the south side. On the inside it shows a unique wrought iron cannon, and an older bastion that was walled in by the current one.

=== Nature ===
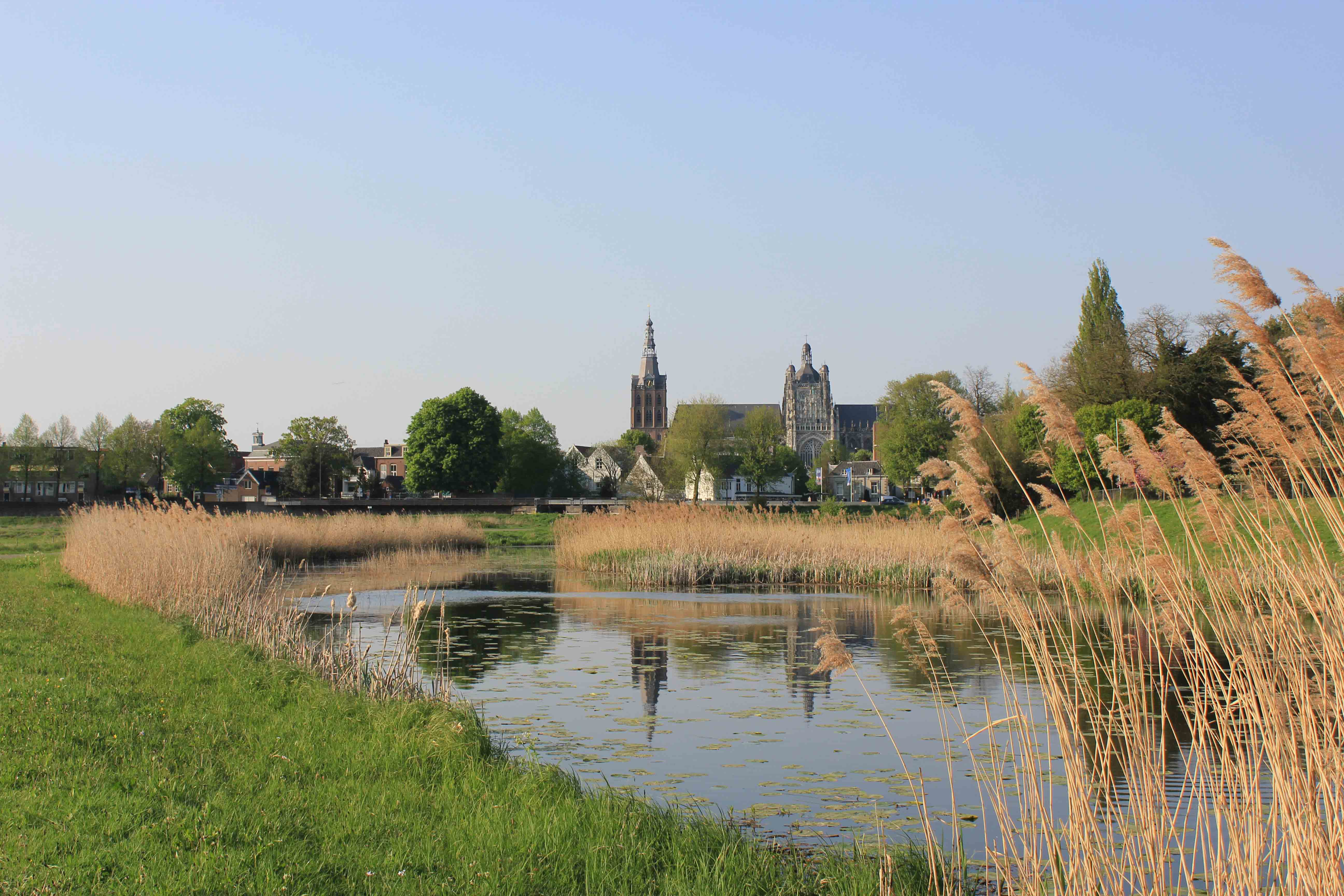
View on the St. Jan from Bossche Broek

On the south side of the city, the city center and walls still border the Bossche Broek, an old polder that could never be made dry. In 1995 the dyke of the Dommel broke and an enormous amount of water entered the polder. It also flooded and blocked the main Dutch highway A2. In order to prevent this in the future, the area was rearranged to store excess water in case of emergencies. In 2006 the area had been furnished with higher dikes and locks that allowed a controlled flooding of the polder and some adjacent areas in case of emergency.

The Bossche Broek is now a 22-hectare (54-acre) nature reserve, that stretches all the way to Vught. It is connected to the Moerputten and Vlijmens Ven, with which it forms a Natura 2000 area. Rare species in the area are the scarce large blue and the European weather loach. The Moerputten sports the Moerputten Bridge, a 600-metre (650 yard) long nineteenth century railway bridge and engineering feat. What is unique about the area is its close proximity to the city center.

=== Miscellaneous ===
The city is also the location of the Bolwoningen complex, an array of fifty experimental spherical houses designed by Dries Kreijkamp.

The Lutheran Church, 's-Hertogenbosch is no longer used as a church.

== Sport ==
The city has one professional football club, FC Den Bosch. It is the 1967 successor of the professional branches of BVV (Bossche Voetbal Vereniging) and Wilhelmina. Both of them still exist as amateur football clubs. As a successor of BVV FC Den Bosch can claim the national championship of 1948. This championship led to the construction of stadium De Vliert, which at one time had a capacity of 30,000. Due to the less successful years that followed, the capacity is now only 8,500 visitors. FC Den Bosch was the first club of Dutch international player Ruud van Nistelrooy.

's-Hertogenbosch is more successful in field hockey. It is home to top club HC Den Bosch. The women's team in particular is a dominant force in the Dutch field hockey competition. The professional basketball club Heroes Den Bosch is also very successful. The city's rugby club is called The Dukes and dates from 1974. It is located at a very scenic location at the foot of the city walls. Because of the limited space, the club plays on artificial turf and part of the accommodation is subterranean. The Dukes has the most junior members. It became the national rugby champion in 2008.

As regards events the city is host to the Rosmalen Grass Court Championships, a combined ATP Tour and WTA Tour grass court tennis event played two weeks before the Wimbledon Championships. The World Archery Championships and World Para Archery Championship were held here in June 2019. During these combined World Championships two separate venues were used: the Parade and the rugby fields of The Dukes. All finals took place in the arena at the Parade. The Parade is a historic square surrounded by high trees, situated at the foot of the nearly seven-hundred-year-old Saint John's Cathedral in the attractive center of 's-Hertogenbosch.

== Transport ==
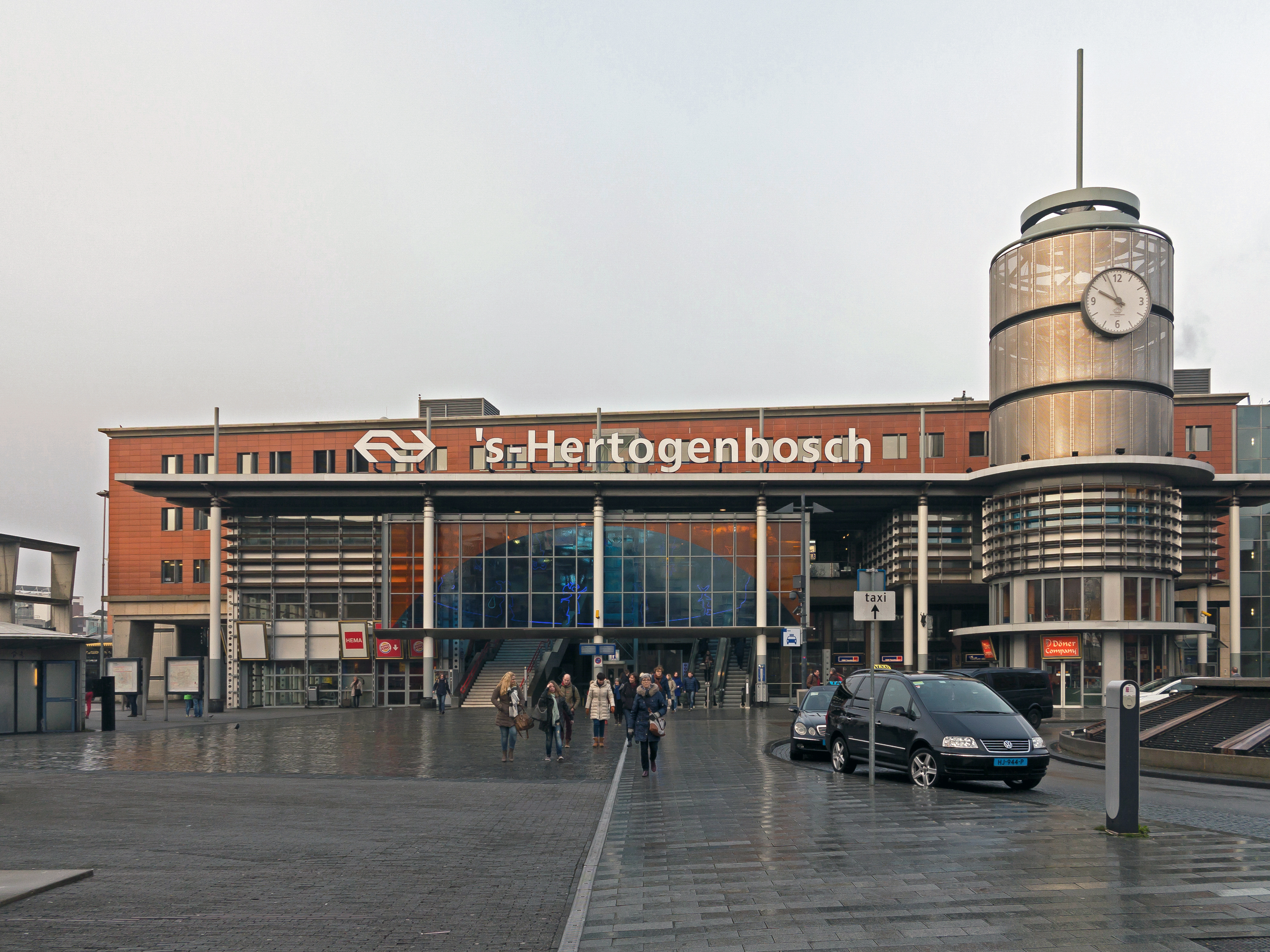
's-Hertogenbosch railway station

The Zuid-Willemsvaart runs from the Meuse just north of the city towards Maastricht via Helmond and Weert. In 's-Hertogenbosch it runs through the city proper, south east from where a bastion has been cut off from the citadel. Because of this route it was impossible to widen it further than for ships of CEMT class II. Therefore, the Máxima Canal of 8 km (5 miles) was dug just east of the city, creating a shortcut from the canal to the Meuse suitable for ships of CEMT class IV. On the remaining part of the Zuid-Willemsvaart west of the city is the industrial harbor of 's-Hertogenbosch. A marina is located in the center.

's-Hertogenbosch is situated on the busy A2 motorway, the most important north–south connection of the Netherlands. This connection was established with the opening of the Dieze Bridge in 1942. From 1961 the Utrecht-'s-Hertogenbosch section was 2 times 2 lanes. In 1970 the A2 was rerouted to the east of the city. In 1989 it finally became a controlled-access highway. In 1996 the section between 's-Hertogenbosch and Eindhoven became a controlled-access highway. The situation in Maastricht was only solved in 2016, when the Koning Willem-Alexandertunnel was opened. On the east–west axis 's-Hertogenbosch is on the A59 motorway. The A65 motorway between 's-Hertogenbosch and Tilburg is a regional highway, but is not completely access-controlled.

's-Hertogenbosch railway station is on the Utrecht–Boxtel part of the railway stretch between Amsterdam and the Dutch industrial/tech center near Eindhoven. As a consequence north–south trains depart every ten minutes. On the Tilburg–Nijmegen railway trains run on a more modest schedule. 's-Hertogenbosch railway station is also a major station for Arriva buslines that serve the city and most of its suburbs. Other stations within the limits of the municipality are 's-Hertogenbosch Oost railway station and Rosmalen railway station. Vught railway station is actually closer to the city center than that in Rosmalen.

's-Hertogenbosch has attempted to adapt to the growing popularity of the bicycle in Dutch cities. A reasonable amount of bike paths has so far been constructed in the town. In 2011, the city was chosen as Fietsstad 2011—the top bike city of the Netherlands for 2011. The details of the report were less jubilant and showed that it was really a prize meant to stimulate 's-Hertogenbosch to take further action; Hugo van der Steenhoven of the Fietsersbond: "In the past years Den Bosch has spent much energy, ambition, creativity and money to give cycling an enormous boost. This is a big achievement for a city where bicycle use is lower than in the rest of the Netherlands".

== Education ==
's-Hertogenbosch has multiple vocational universities called Hogeschool in Dutch. The HAS Hogeschool of about 3,500 students is focused on agricultural and food technology. Avans Hogeschool is located in 's-Hertogenbosch and two nearby cities. The AKV St. Joost is an art academy that is now part of Avans and dates back to 1812. Fontys Hogeschool also offers some education in the city. The Jheronimus Academy of Data Science (JADS), located at the Mariënburg Campus in the center of 's-Hertogenbosch, and provides a number of data science programs at graduate (MSc) and post-graduate level (PhD). It is a department of the Eindhoven University of Technology and Tilburg University.

In secondary education the City Gymnasium is a gymnasium (school) that originated from the Latin school of the city. It is comparable to a grammar school and can trace its origin back 1274. The same type of education and all other types of secondary education are offered by a number of large institutes.

== Religion ==
Religions in 's-Hertogenbosch (2013)
1. No affiliation (44.8%)
2. Roman Catholic (43.3%)
3. Protestant (4.10%)
4. Other Christian denominations (2.10%)
5. Islam (5.00%)
6. Hinduism (0.30%)
7. Buddhism (0.40%)

Roman Catholicism is the dominant religion in 's-Hertogenbosch, with somewhat more than 40% of the population counting themselves as belonging to it. Even so, attendance at mass is significantly lower than 40%. Three churches in the city center are still in use by the Catholic church: Saint John's Cathedral, Saint Catherine and the Monastery Church of the Franciscans nearby the railway station. Smaller churches in use by the Roman Catholic church are: Saint Anne's Church in Hintham, Saint Landoline Church in Empel, Saint Willibrord Church in Maaspoort, Saint Lambert Church (Rosmalen), etc.

The Protestant religion has seen its share of believers in the city fall from 20% to about 4%. It is based in the Great Church. The Eastern Orthodox Church is a new church in town. It is based at Saint Catherine's Church where Catholic worship services have been held again since 2021.

The Arrahma Mosque has been built by the Moroccan community. The Turkish community has the Orhan Gazi Mosque.

== Notable residents ==
=== Public thinking and public service ===
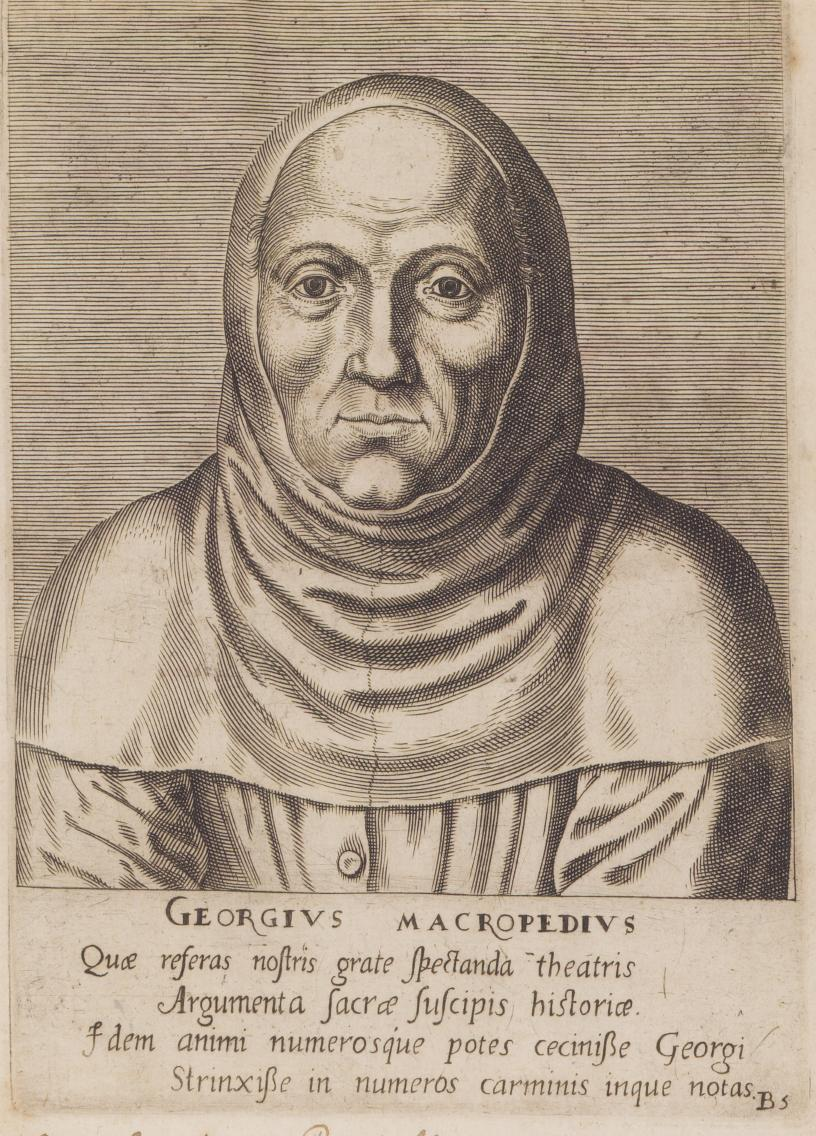
Macropedius, 1572

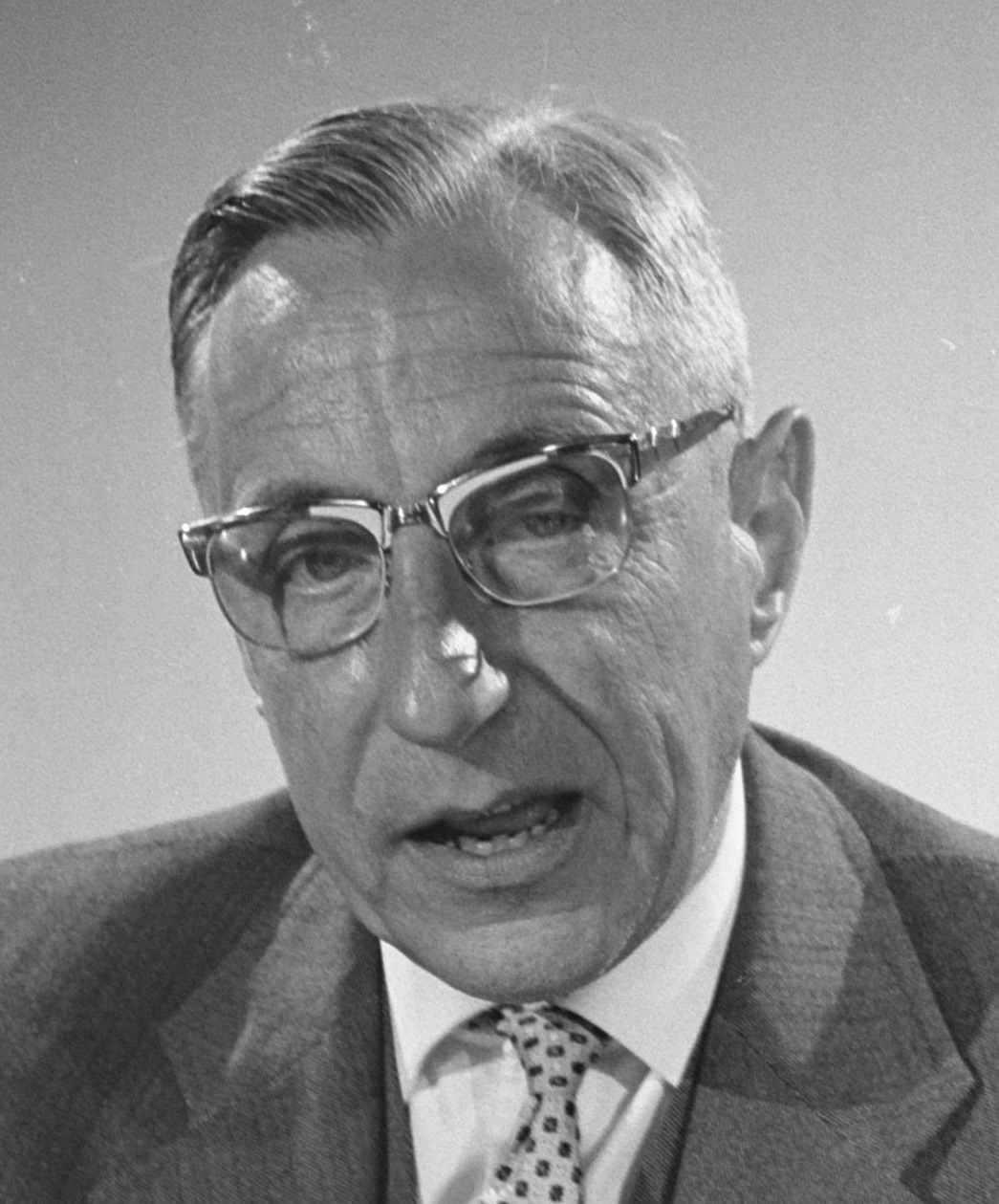
Jan de Quay, 1962

- Erasmus (1484–1497), priest and humanist scholar
- Macropedius (1487–1558), a Dutch humanist, schoolmaster and Latin playwright
- John Slotanus (died 1560), a Dutch Roman Catholic polemical writer.
- Johannes Chrysostomus vander Sterre (1591–1652), an ecclesiastical writer and abbot
- Johan Bax van Herenthals (1637–1678), the governor of the Dutch Cape Colony 1676/1678
- Laurens Storm van 's Gravesande (1704–1775), governor of Essequibo and Demerara
- Petrus Josephus Johannus Sophia Marie van der Does de Willebois (1843–1937), a Dutch jonkheer, politician and Mayor of 's-Hertogenbosch
- Joseph Sweens (1858–1950), an RC missionary bishop in South Nyanza in German East Africa
- Christiaan Cornelissen (1864–1942), a Dutch syndicalist writer, economist and trade unionist
- Henk Sneevliet (1883–1942), a Dutch Communist, active in both the Netherlands and the Dutch East Indies
- Frans Teulings (1891–1966), a Dutch politician and economist
- Pieter Godfried Maria van Meeuwen (1899–1982), a Dutch judge and a politician
- Jan de Quay (1901–1985), a politician and psychologist; Prime Minister of the Netherlands 1959/1963
- Bert Röling (1906–1985), a Dutch jurist and founding father of polemology, the study of war
- Louis van de Laar (1921–2004), a Dutch politician and historian
- Bram Stemerdink (born 1936), a retired Dutch politician and army officer
- Don Burgers (1932–2006), a Dutch politician, mayor of 's-Hertogenbosch from 1989 to 1996
- Marco Kroon (born 1970), soldier with the Korps Commandotroepen
- Matthijs van Miltenburg (born 1972), a politician, municipal councillor 2010/2014 and MEP 2014/2019

=== Science and business ===
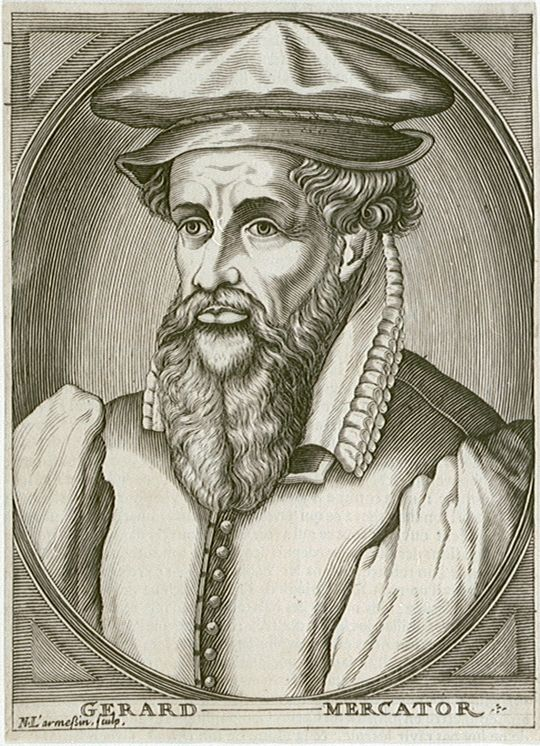
Mercator, engraving from 1739

- Gerardus Mercator (ca.1520–1530), a geographer, cosmographer and cartographer
- Wilhelm de Raet (ca.1537-1583), a Dutch hydraulic engineer and master builder, worked in Lucca
- Willem 's Gravesande (1688–1742), a Dutch academic, mathematician and natural philosopher, developed the laws of classical mechanics
- Gerard Troost (1776–1850), a Dutch-American medical doctor, naturalist and mineralogist
- Jacob Moleschott (1822–1893), physiologist and writer on dietetics and scientific materialism
- Diederik Korteweg (1848–1941), a mathematician, co-wrote the Korteweg–de Vries equation
- Jacob R. H. Neervoort van de Poll (1862–1924), an entomologist specialising in Coleoptera
- Peter Reijnders (1900–1974), a photographer and film director; co-founded the theme park Efteling
- Frans de Waal (1948–2024), primatologist, ethologist and academic

=== Art ===
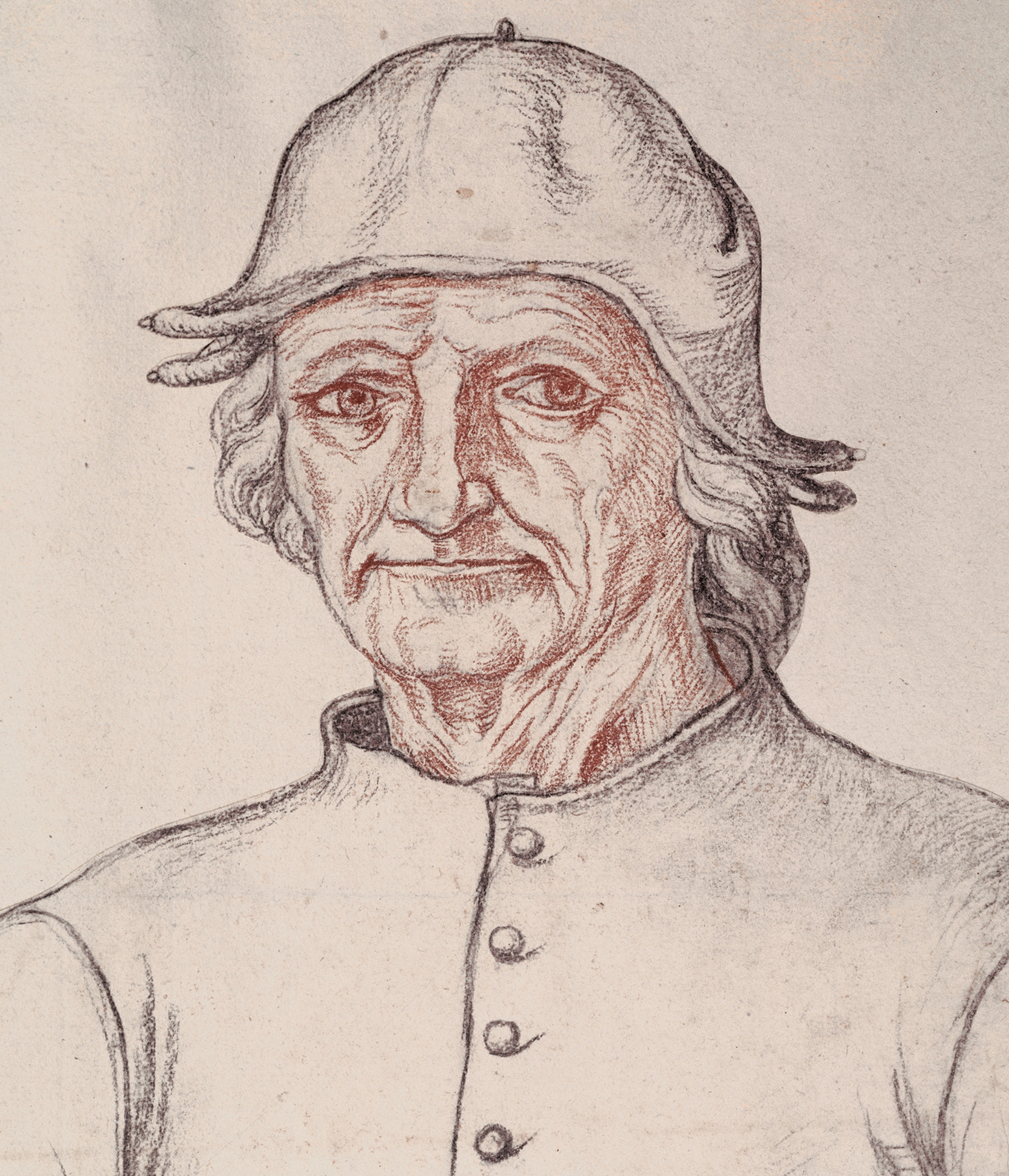
Jheronimus Bosch, posthumous portrait from ca.1550

- Hieronymus Bosch (ca.1450–1516), painter of the Early Netherlandish painting school.
- Hubert Gerhard (ca.1540–1620), a Dutch sculptor
- Abraham van Diepenbeeck (1596–1675), a Dutch painter of the Flemish School.
- Theodoor van Thulden (1606–1669), a painter and engraver of altarpieces and portraits.
- Quirinus van Amelsfoort (1760–1820), a Dutch painter of allegories, history and portraits
- Karel Sluijterman (1863–1931), a Dutch architect, furniture designer, interior designer, illustrator, ceramist, book binding designer and professor
- Anton Sistermans (1865–1926), a Dutch baritone, singer of lieder and oratorios
- Sophie van der Does de Willebois (1891–1961), a Dutch ceramist
- Charles Bolsius (1907–1983), painter and woodworker
- Willem van den Hout (1915–1985), a Dutch writer of the Bob Evers series of children's books
- Jos van Veldhoven (born 1952), a Dutch choral conductor
- Leon de Winter (born 1954), writer and columnist
- Oscar van Dillen (born 1958), a Dutch composer, conductor and instrumentalist

=== Sport ===
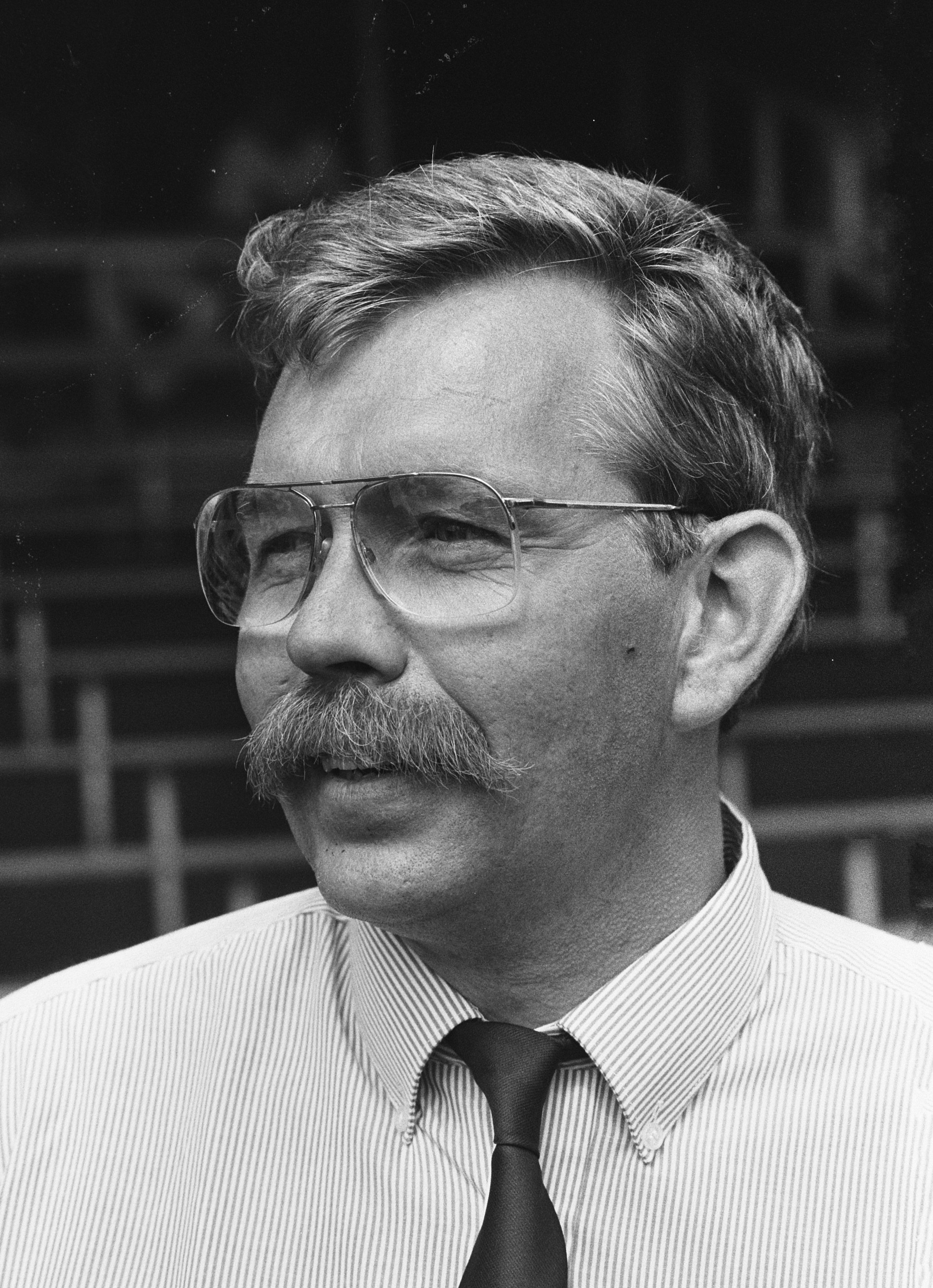
Gijs van Heumen, 1986

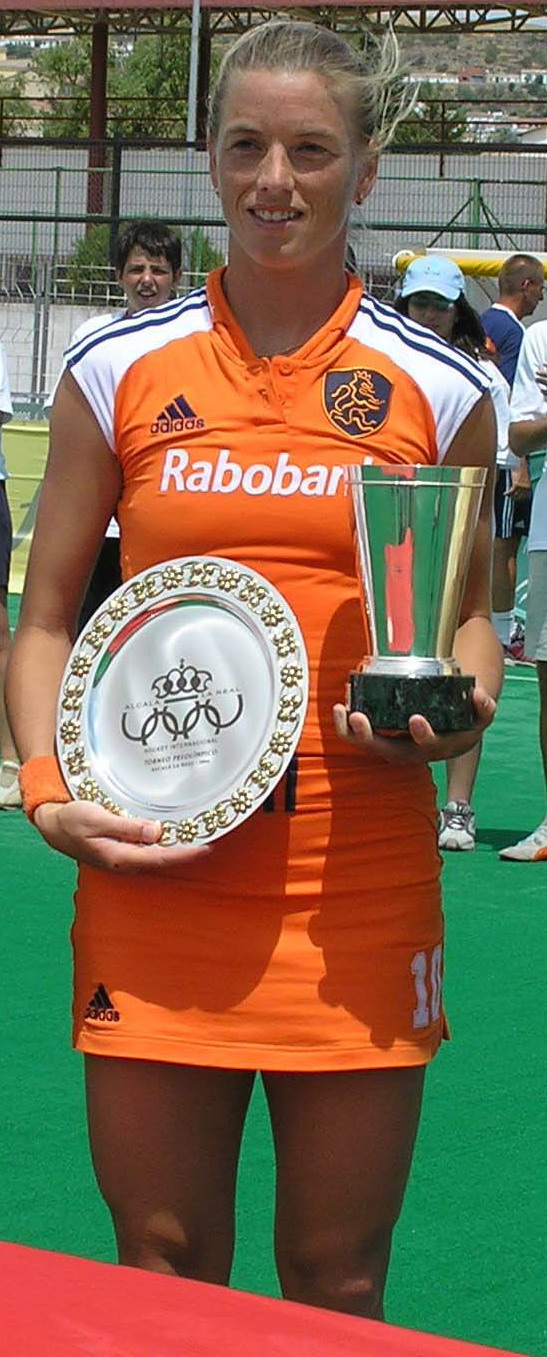
Mijntje Donners, 2004

- Henri Smulders (1863–1933), a sailor and team silver medallist at the 1900 Summer Olympics
- Sjef van Run (1904–1973), a Dutch footballer, appeared 359 times for PSV Eindhoven
- Wim van Heumen (1928–1992), a field hockey coach and municipal councillor 1970/1992
- Gijs van Heumen (born 1952), a retired field hockey coach, son of Wim
- Cees Schapendonk (born 1955), a former football striker with over 510 club caps
- Sophie von Weiler (born 1958), a retired Dutch field hockey forward, team gold and bronze medallist at the 1984 and 1988 Summer Olympics
- Arnold Scholten (born 1962), a retired football midfielder with over 440 club caps
- Marcel Brands (born 1962), a former professional footballer, former Director of Football at Everton F.C.
- Fred van der Hoorn (born 1963), a Dutch former footballer with over 500 club caps
- Manon Bollegraf (born 1964), a former professional female tennis player
- Annemarie Verstappen (born 1965), a female former freestyle swimmer, team silver and double bronze medallist at the 1984 Summer Olympics
- Mijntje Donners (born 1974), field hockey player, with 234 caps for the Dutch National Women's Team, and team silver and bronze medallist at three Summer Olympics
- Anthony Lurling (born 1977), a Dutch former footballer with 587 club caps
- brothers Geert-Jan Derikx (born 1980) & Rob Derikx (born 1982), field hockey players, team silver medallists at the 2004 Summer Olympics
- Henri van Opstal (born 1989), a Dutch kickboxer
- Robin van Roosmalen (born 1989), a Dutch kickboxer and mixed martial artist
- Maikel Scheffers (born 1982), wheelchair tennis player, bronze medallist at the 2008 Summer Paralympics
- Andy Souwer (born 1982), a Dutch welterweight shoot boxer and mixed martial artist
- Maartje Goderie (born 1984), a Dutch field hockey player, twice team gold medallist at the 2008 and 2012 Summer Olympics
- Carlien Dirkse van den Heuvel (born 1987), a Dutch field hockey player, team gold and silver medallist at the 2012 and 2016 Summer Olympics
- Marianne Vos (born 1987), a Dutch cyclo-cross, road, track and mountain bicycle racer
- Kenny van Gaalen (born 1988), a Dutch sidecarcross rider
- Toon Greebe (born 1988), a Dutch darts player
- Patrick van Aanholt (born 1990), a Dutch professional footballer with over 280 club caps
- Michiel van der Heijden (born 1992), a Dutch mountain biker and Cyclo-Cross Rider.

== Literature ==
- Lourens, Piet; Lucassen, Jan (1997). Inwonertallen van Nederlandse steden ca. 1300–1800. Amsterdam: NEHA. ISBN 9057420082.
