= Swan Brothers' House =

Museum in 's-Hertogenbosch, Netherlands

Swan Brothers' house
- Zwanenbroedershuis
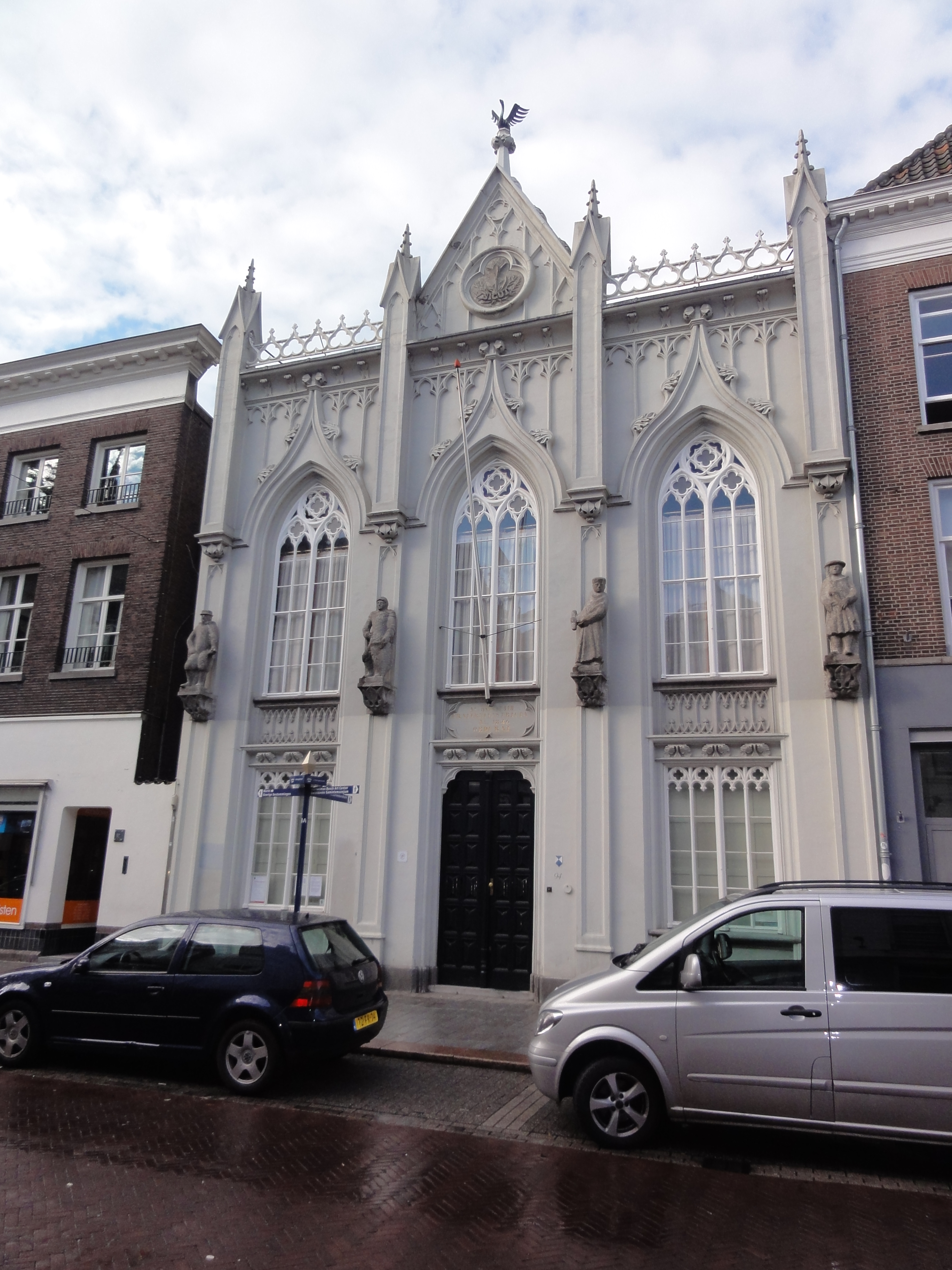
- Swan Brothers' House

- North Brabant
- Location: Hinthamerstraat 94 's-Hertogenbosch, Netherlands
- Coordinates: 51.688694°N 5.309611°E
- Director: Tom Witlox (administrator)
- Architect: J.H. Laffertée
- Website: http://www.zwanenbroedershuis.nl/

The Swan Brothers' House in 's-Hertogenbosch is a museum and the home of a famous medieval confraternity.

== History ==
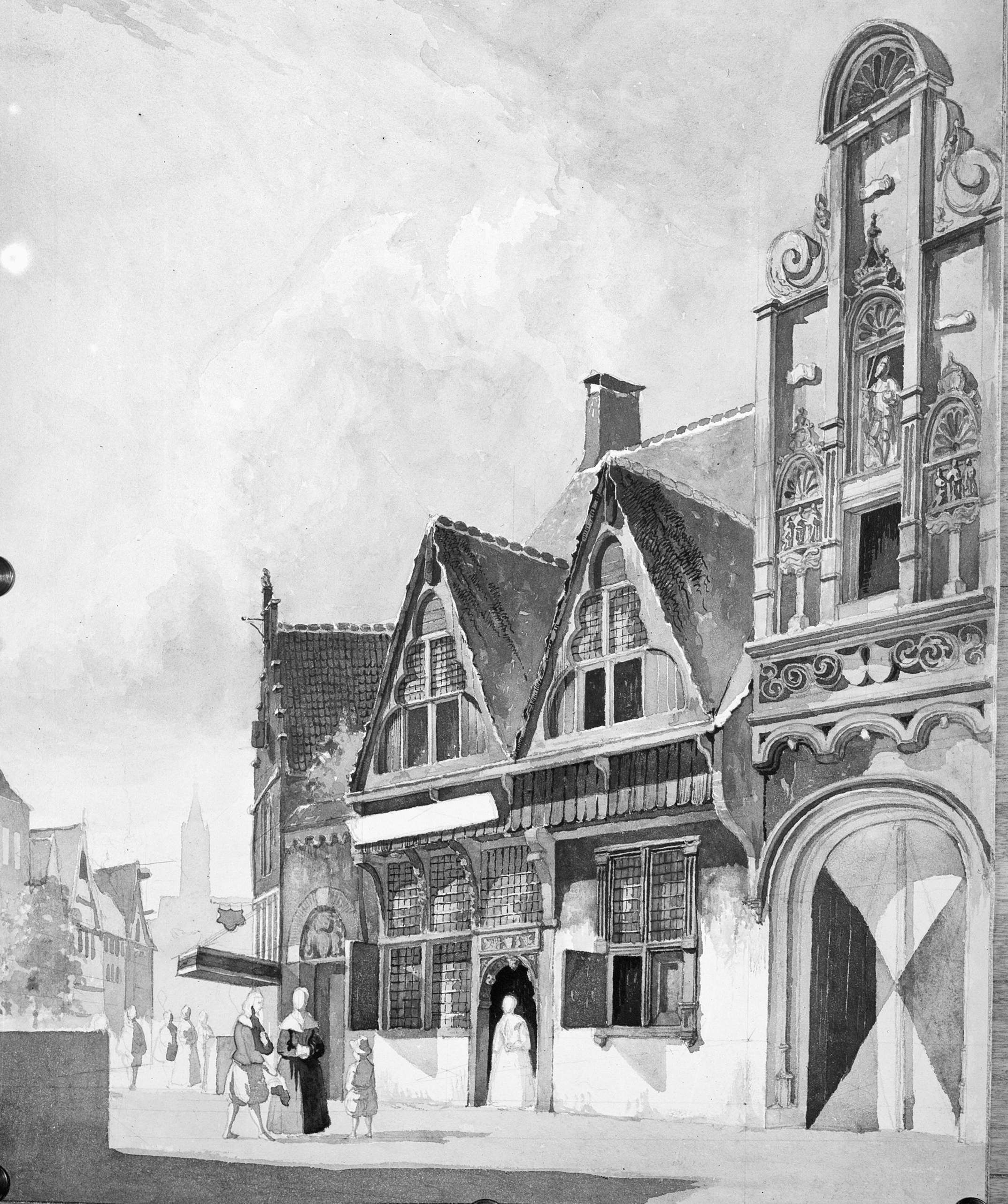
The old house in 1838

In 1318 the Illustre Lieve Vrouwe Broederschap (Brotherhood of the famous Blessed Lady) was founded in 's-Hertogenbosch. Its religious works mainly took place in a chapel in St. John's Cathedral. The first meeting room of the brotherhood was in a tower of the church. In 1379 they made some changes there, to keep out the pigeons. In 1484 the brotherhood moved to Hinthamerstraat. Gijsbertus van der Poorten had left his house De Pauw (The Peacock) to the confraternity.

In 1535–1538 the house was renovated in Renaissance Style after a design by Architect Jan Darkennis. Three centuries later the building required so much repair that it had to be demolished and was replaced by the current building. Some pictures and drawings of the old building survive. It allowed to create a 3D reconstruction of this building. The current museum also holds some fragments.

The current building was built in 1846–1847 in neo-Gothic style. It was a design by J.H. Laffertée. In 1868–1870 the great hall was finished with timber by Lambert Hezenmans. A wrought iron stove also dates from the neo-Gothic construction. In the 1950–1958 the building was renovated. The copper swan on top of the façade dates from this renovation.

In 1962 four limestone statues were placed in the façade. These are by Marius van Beek. From left to right they represent: William the Silent (first brother of the House of Orange), Gerardus van Uden (founder of the confraternity), Gijsbertus van Poorten (Who gave the first house) and Floris van Egmont (important Swan Brother). In 1965 the Swan Brothers' House became a national monument.

== Museum ==
In the 1930s the Swan Brothers' House was considered to be a museum. At that time it was open on Fridays, from 11 till 3 o'clock, and visited by on average 125 people a year. The building was officially registered as a museum in 2005. The house meanwhile continues to be used by the brotherhood.

Of course the history of the building and the brotherhood itself is the main story told by the museum. Nevertheless, there are some interesting art object in the museum. These include two altar cabinets that were part of the Mary altar that Adriaen van Wesel commissioned between 1475 and 1477. The cabinets show the image of John of Patmos and the vision of Emperor Augustus.

There are also nine large sixteenth century choir books containing polyphonic music: seven manuscripts and two editions. Three of these rare manuscripts of the confraternity originate from the workshop of the famous music copyist Pierre Alamire. The museum also has many objects with the arms of the members. Not the least of these is the pewter wine pitcher of William the Silent.

== Gallery ==
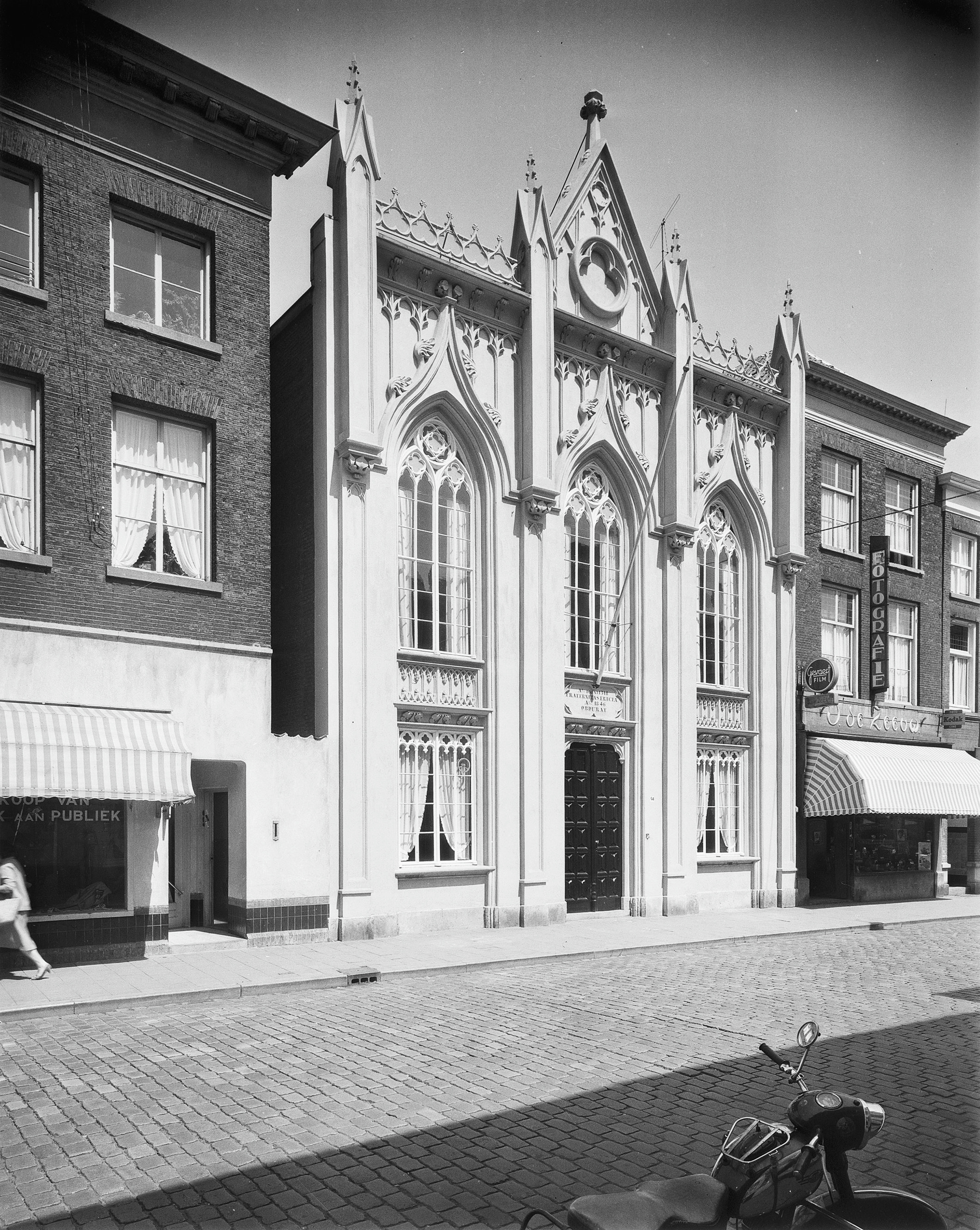

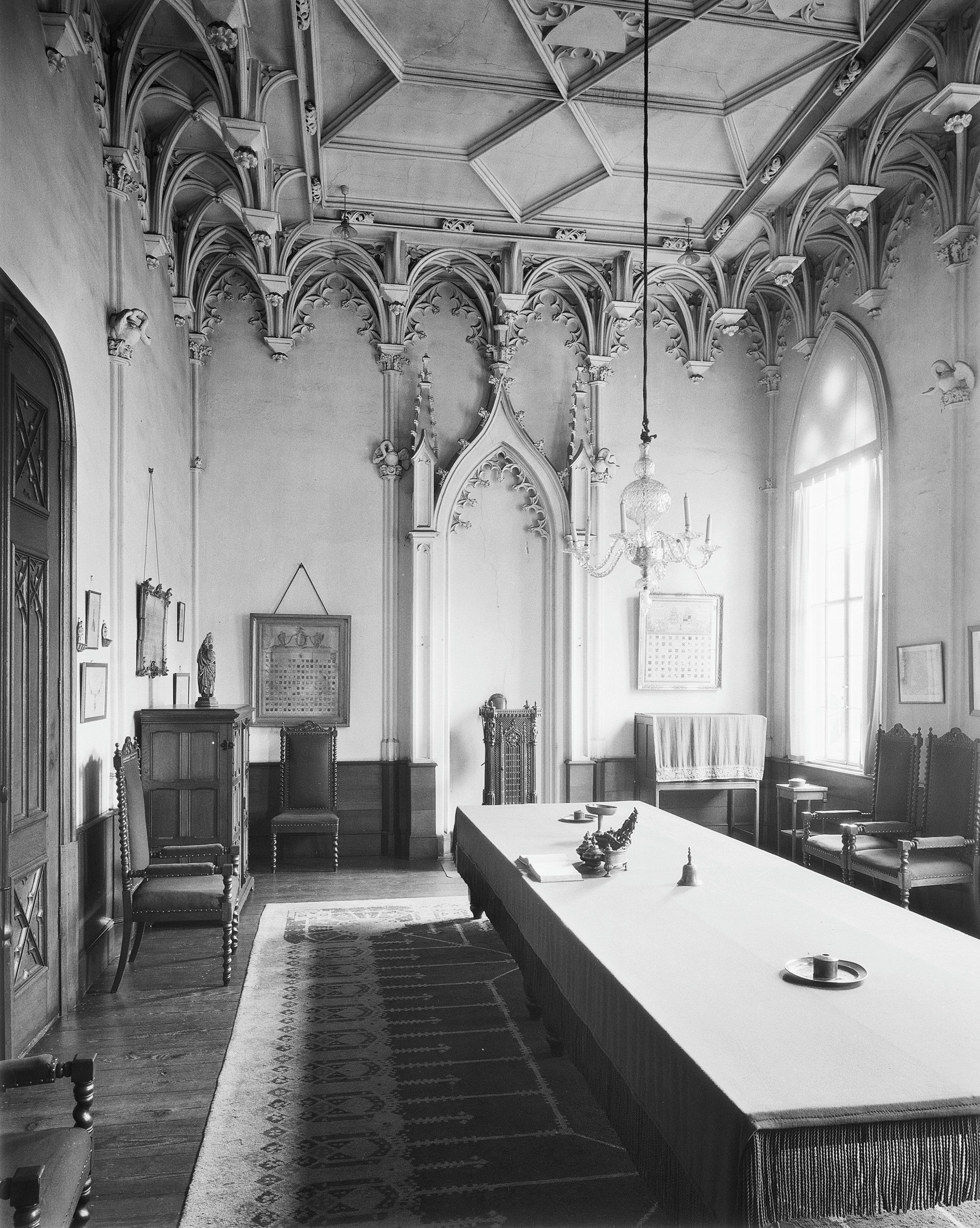

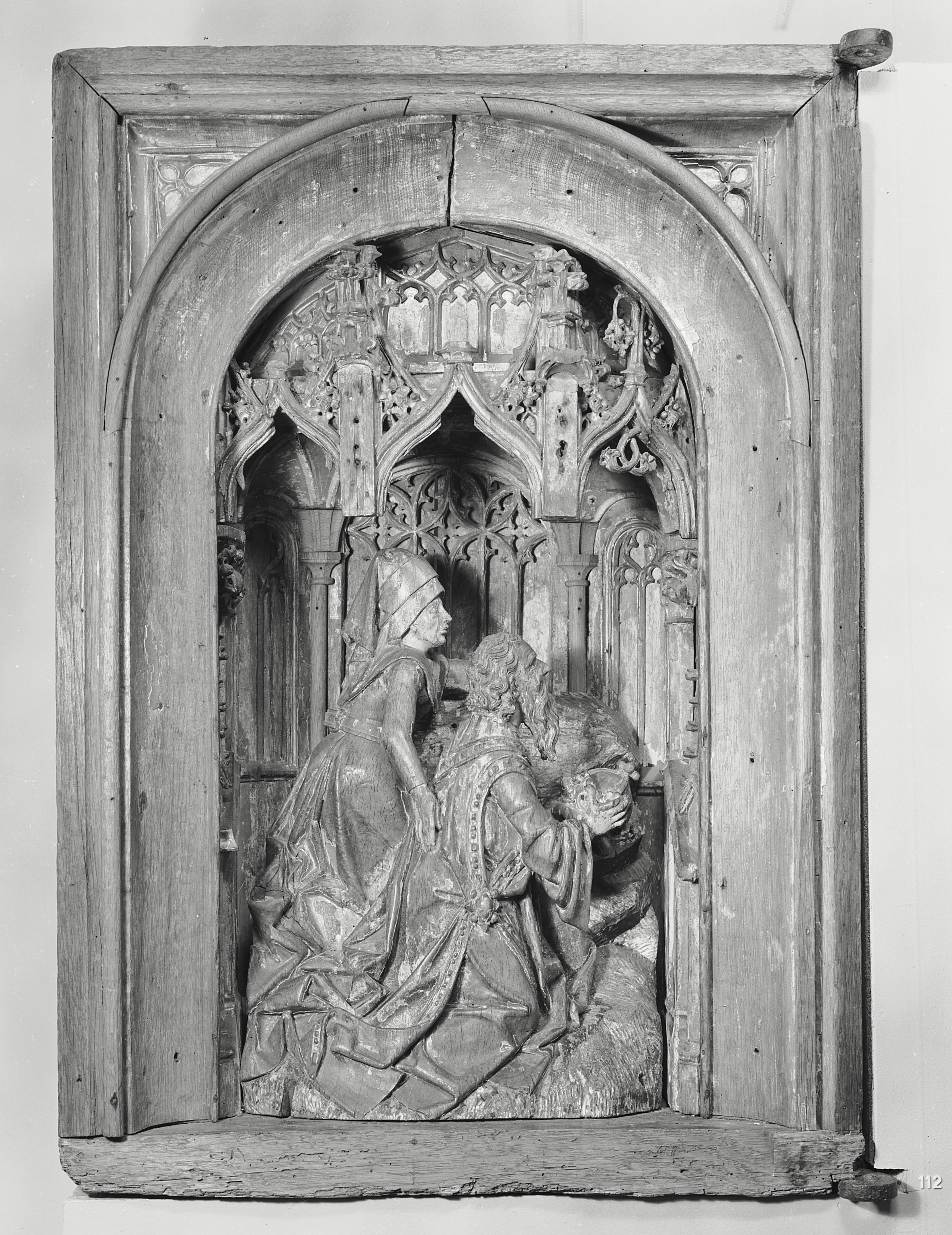

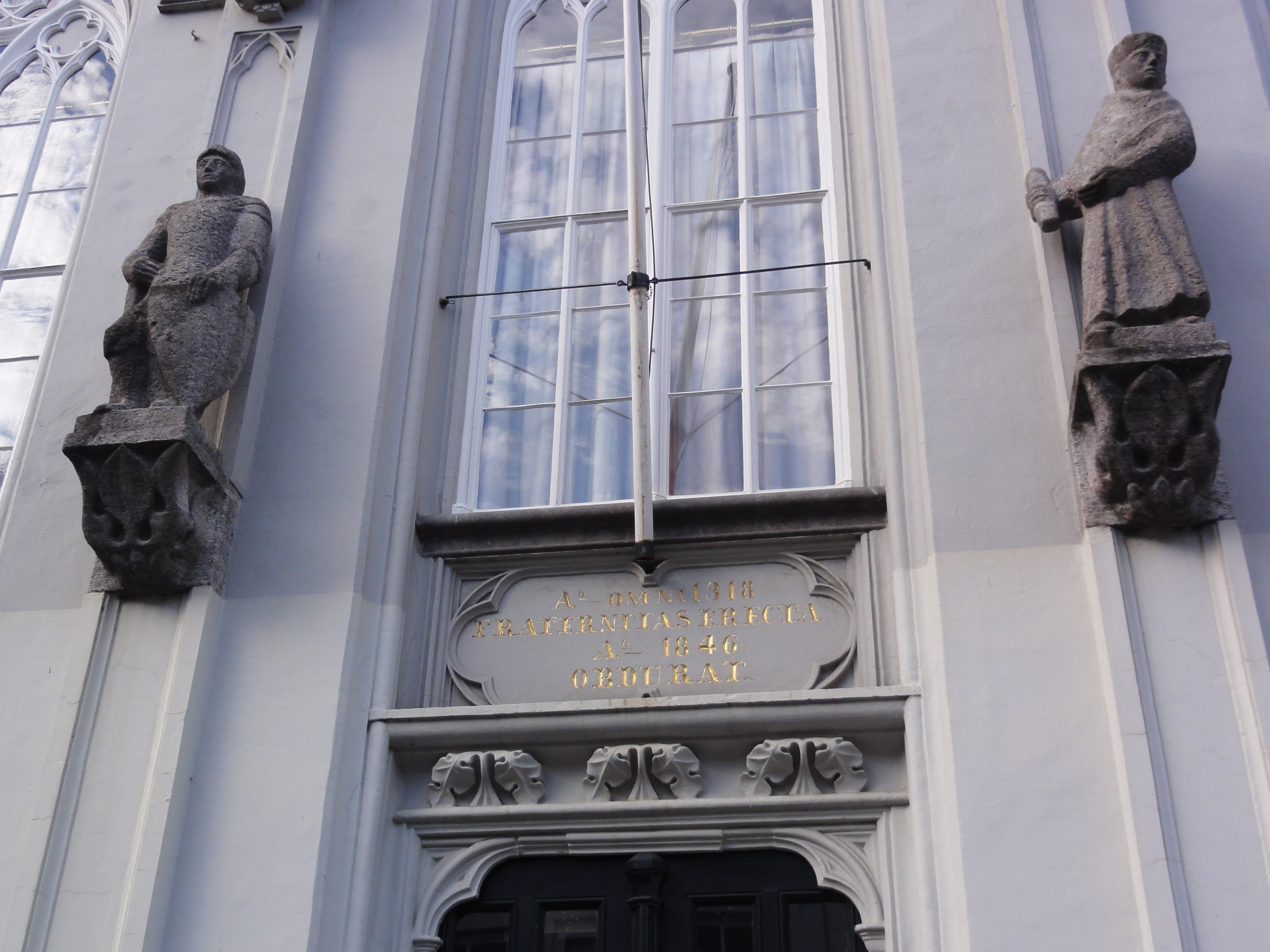

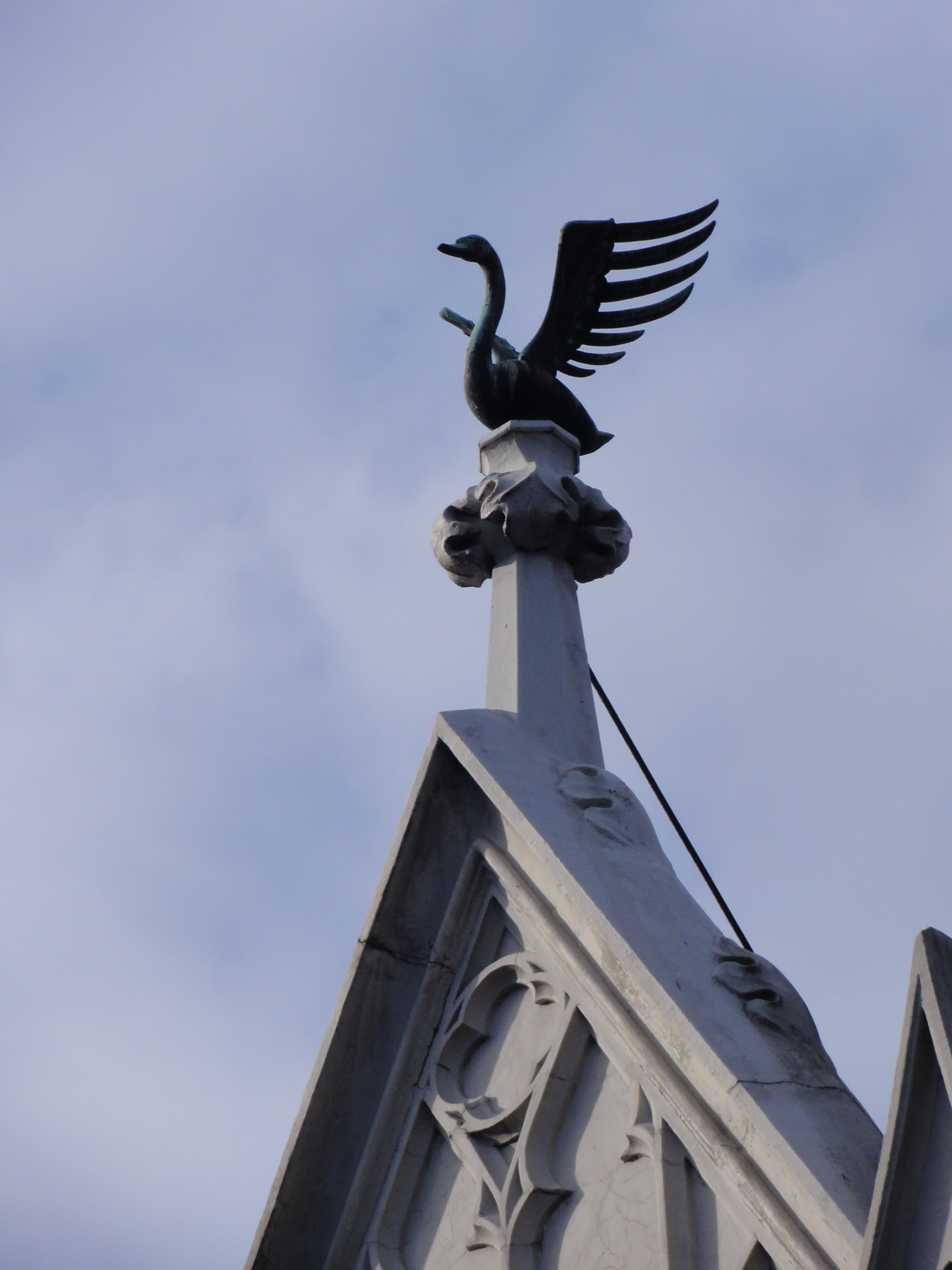
