= Great Church (disambiguation) =

The term "Great Church" is used in the historiography of early Christianity to mean the period of about 180 to 313.

Great Church may also refer to:

- Great Church of Christ, used to describe the Ecumenical Patriarchate of Constantinople
- the Magna Ecclesia, the first church on the site of the Hagia Sophia cathedral, in present-day Turkey
- Domus Aurea (Antioch), a former cathedral in Antioch, in present-day Turkey
- Great Church, 's-Hertogenbosch, Netherlands
- Storkyrkan, a cathedral in Stockholm, Sweden
- Kecskemét Cathedral, Hungary
