= Maurick Castle =

Castle in Vught, the Netherlands

- Kasteel Maurick
- Vught, the Netherlands
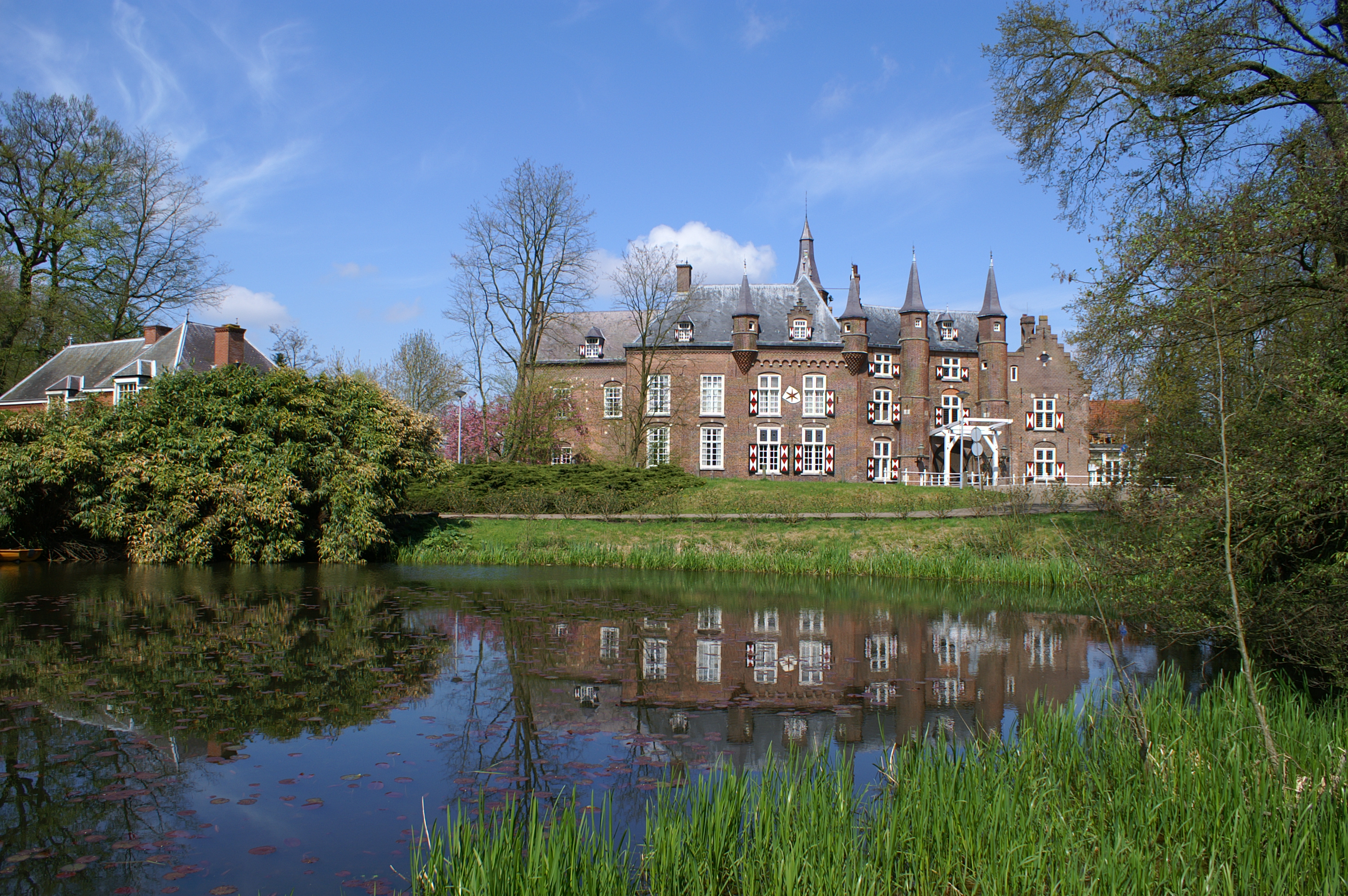
- Maurick Castle

Site information
- Type: Castle
- Open to the public: Yes
- Condition: Good

Location
- The Netherlands
- Location within Netherlands
- Coordinates: 51.658226°N 5.306450°E

Site history
- Built: c. 1400

Maurick Castle is a castle in Vught, Netherlands. It had many famous owners and visitors.

== Building ==
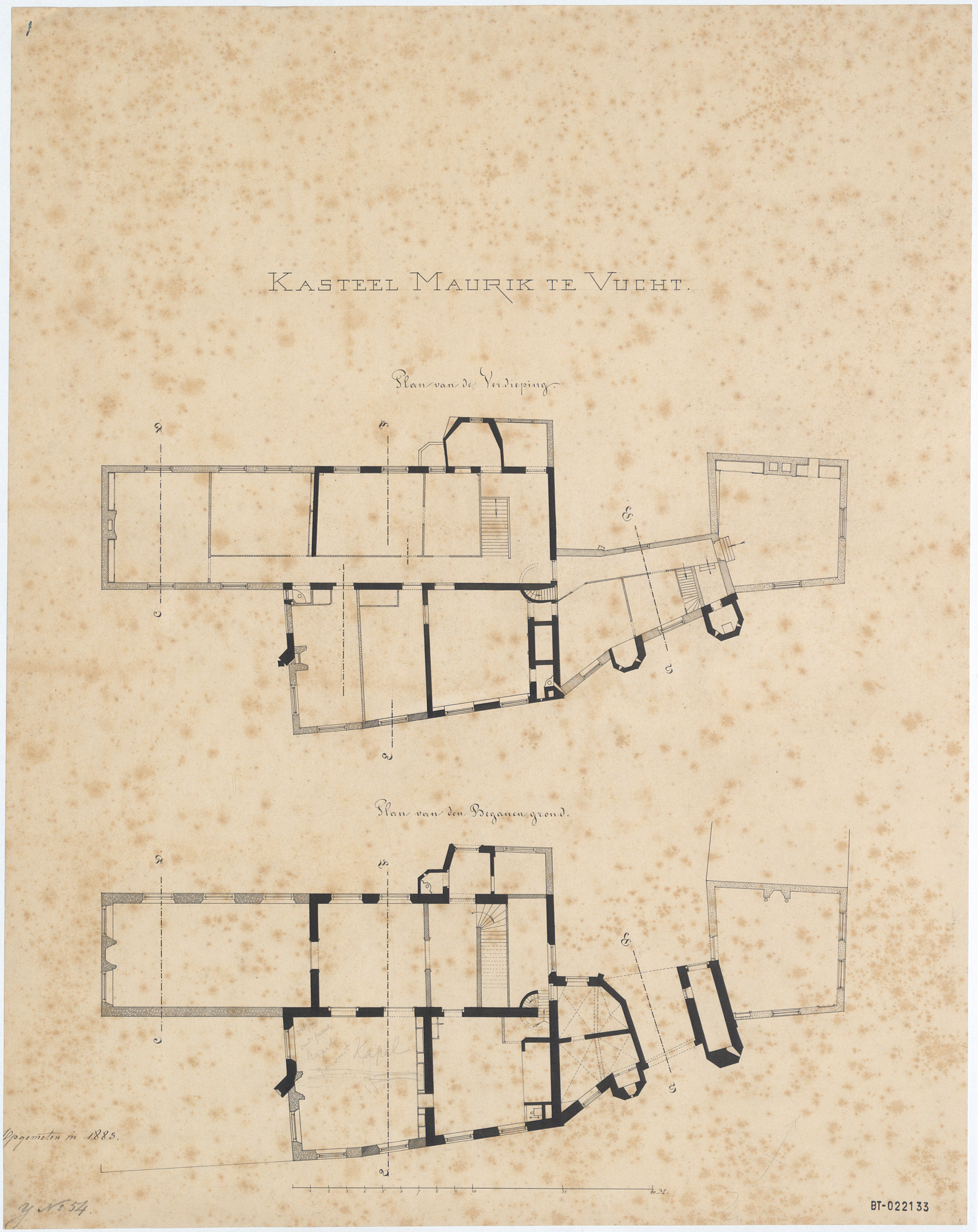
Ground and first floor

The current castle has a rather illogical form. The core is formed by a seemingly very large main building 'glued' to a gate building of the same height. The core makes a very defendable impression, but together with some other buildings, it is on an island way too large to makes sense from a defensive point of view. This suggests that the castle is on the outer bailey of a preceding castle.

The gate building probably dates from the early fifteenth century. The main building with the overhanging towers, just west of the gate, seems a single 4 windows wide structure, but this is not the case. In fact the part with the two windows directly below and between the overhanging towers belongs to the original main building, and probably dates from 1504-1509. The part immediately adjacent to the west is an early nineteenth century regularization of some earlier parts, and contains part of a Gothic tower of unknown date. The wide part of the main building directly behind these two parts, and the partly octagonal tower on the courtyard probably also date from 1504-1509.

The west wing on the north side is of a later date. The heavily changed east wing dates from the seventeenth century. The orangery on the courtyard is of a still later date. Perhaps an archaeological investigation might one day give more certainty about the earliest phases and strange composition of the castle.

== History ==
=== The Lords of Vught ===
Maurick Castle is situated on an island in a dead meander of the Dommel. Originally, it was just across the harbor of Vught, which was one of the most important trading stations in Brabant before 's-Hertogenbosch was founded. The founders were the Lords of Vught. When the territory was later mentioned for the first time, it was said to include a hill, later even a hill with a house on it. Therefore there might have been motte-and-bailey predecessor of the current castle.

=== Liescep and Van Maurick family ===
The Liescep family from 's-Hertogenbosch are the first known owners of the site. John Liescep (?-1352) son of Gijsbrecht Liescep was mentioned as a landowner owning a hill in 1312. In 1355 his son Gijsbrecht Liescep (?- c 1374) was mentioned as owning some land with a hill near Vught. There was no mention of a building on this hill, but this is not necessary for it to have been a motte-and-bailey castle. Gijsbrecht left his possessions to his sister Catherina Liescep (?-1383/1384). She left it to her niece Catherina van Aelst (?-1420), married to Hendrick van Maurick (1345-1399) a knight from Maurik in Gelderland. In 1421 their daughter Katheline was mentioned as owner of a hill with a house on it in Vught. In 1429 the Maurick's sold the castle.

=== The first stone keep ===
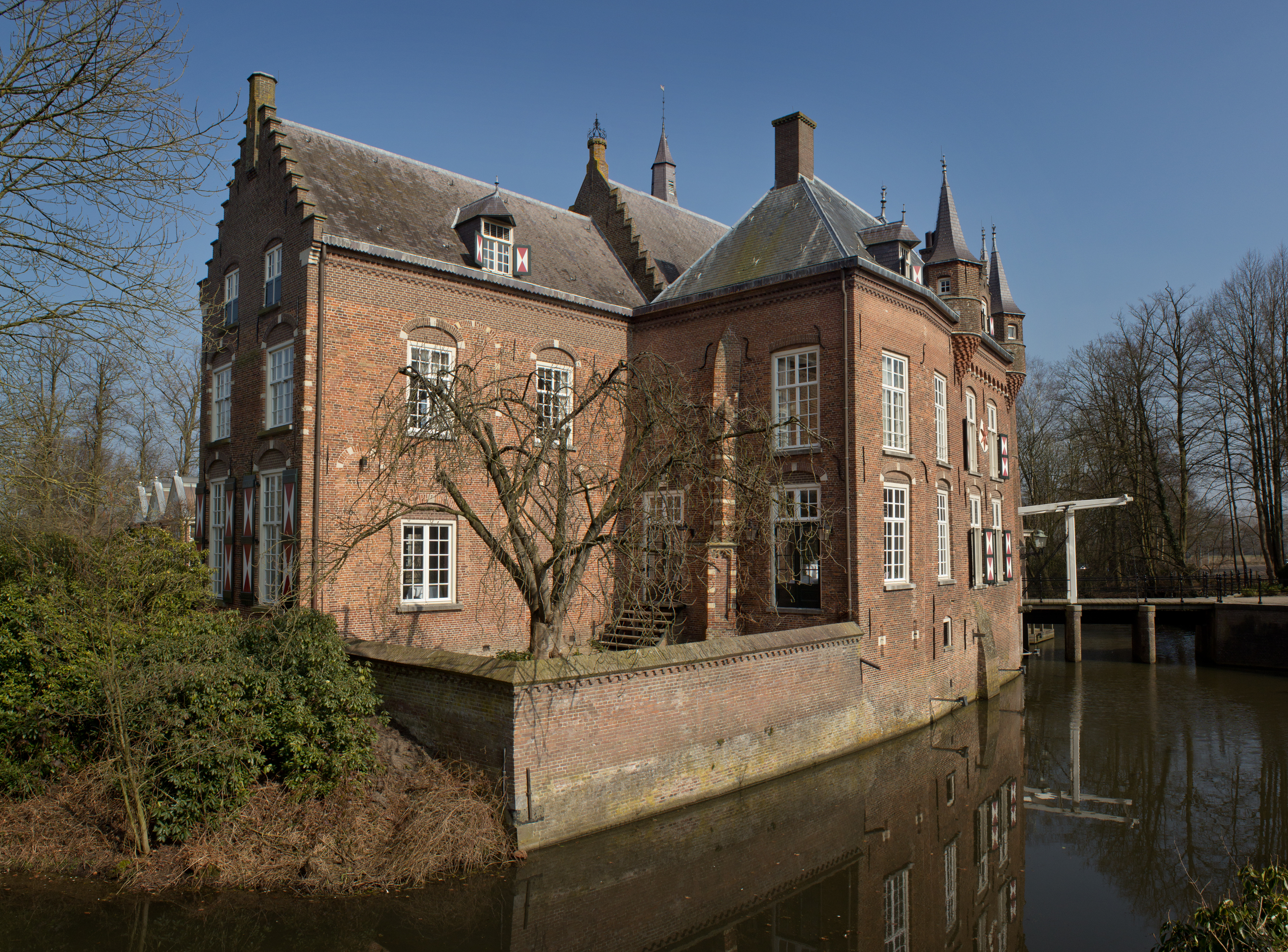
The side that has the remnants of the Gothic tower

In 1429 Godscalc Roesmont, member of the council of ’s-Hertogenbosch bought the castle. In 1443 Hendrick van Vladeracken (?-1464) became the new owner. His son Deynalt van Vladeracken sold it on the day he inherited Maurick. The first stone castle, or rather stone keep (a habitable tower-like house) was probably built by Godscalc Roesmont from 1430 and 1436, because in those years he ordered 44,000 and 25,000 bricks in Orthen. Even this is not exact, because the brick might also have been used for nearby Muizerik manor.

It is tempting to assume that the motte-and-bailey castle is the same as the current castle. This is probably not the case, because the current terrain misses a high hill. There are reasons to suppose that the 'motte' was on a small island just north of the current island. This motte might then have been lowered after construction of the current castle on its outer bailey. This would also explain the strange situation of the current castle at the fringe of a large island.

The walls of the current castle have a maximum width of 60 cm. This is inline with the castle being a manor built by a city dweller like Godscalc Roesmont. The maximum width also meant that it could not withstand a siege. Therefore the current castle does not qualify as a true castle, but only as a so-called 'moated site'. Maurick could not withstand a siege, but with its wide moat and solid buildings, it was defensible against enemies that did not come up with siege weapons. However, even this limited defendability would count for nothing if an enemy could install himself on a close by motte. I.e. constructing the current castle would require the removal of a supposed nearby motte.

=== The Heym family ===
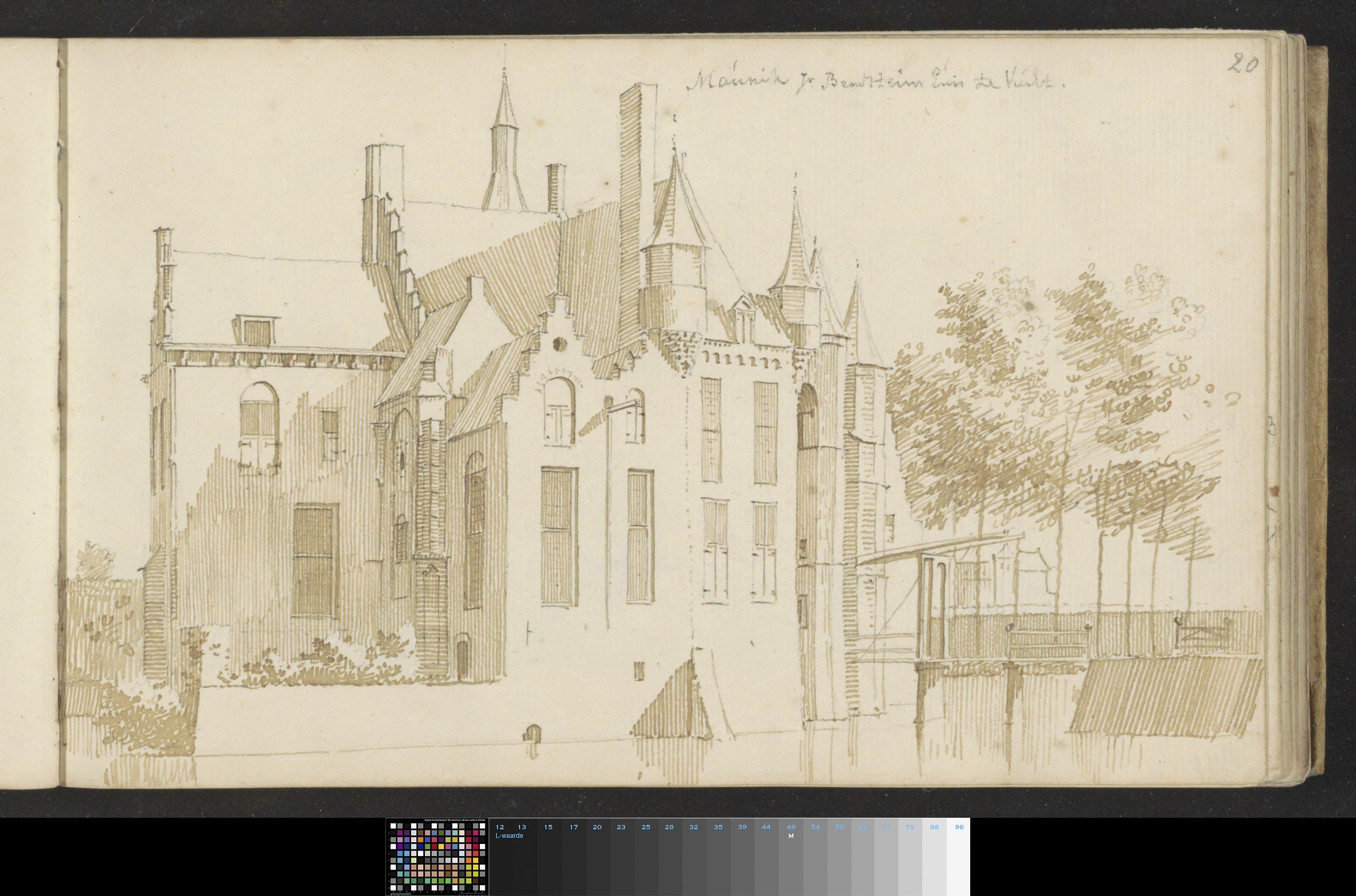
Maurick Castle 1701-1759

The exterior form of the current castle is generally attributed to sixteenth century construction work ordered by the Heym family. The Heym coat of arms is cemented in the southern facade of one of the main buildings, and has been there for centuries. In 1504-1509 the castle was altered by Jan Heyns, one of the architects of St. John's Cathedral in 's-Hertogenbosch. This is proven by the fact that Heym ordered many construction materials at the workshop which also provided these for the St. John, and that Jan Heyns paid for some of these, proving his involvement. The problem is that this fact is/was often used to claim that Jan Heyns built the current castle. A clear source for such a claim is missing.

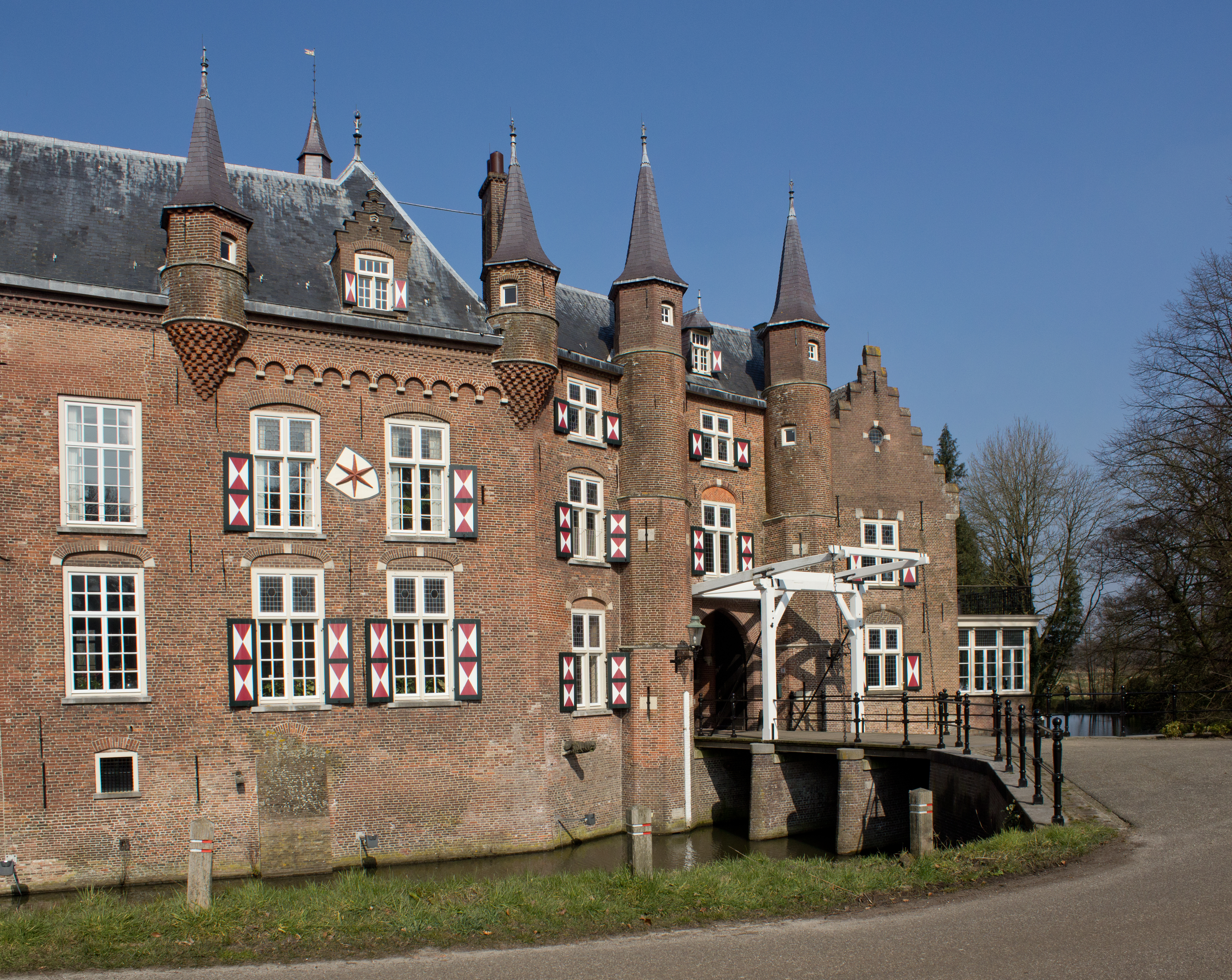
Castle gate and facade with Heym coat of arms (the six pointed star)

In 1464 Knight Goessen Heym (?-1470) bought the castle. He was a member of the city council of 's-Hertogenbosch, and receiver of the states in the 's-Hertogenbosch quarter. The rich Heym family kept the castle in its possession over multiple generations, and so it was often referred to as Heym Manor (Dutch: Heymhuizinghe).

In 1543 a Gelderland army led by Maarten van Rossum marched into Brabant, reaching as far as Antwerp. It burned down Vught on 26 juli 1543, but not Maurick castle. The defenses of 's-Hertogenbosch were led by Aert Heym (c. 1494-1562). Some say that he had an agreement with Van Rossum to spare the castle. On the other hand Van Heurn supposed that Heym kept his castle by garrisoning it with some soldiers from the city. Of course the likelihood of either explanation depends on how strong the castle was at the time, and whether Van Rossum had siege weapons.

A later Aert Heym (?-1612) twice had to leave the castle because Maurice, Prince of Orange used it as his headquarters during his failed sieges of 's-Hertogenbosch. During the 1629 Siege of 's-Hertogenbosch Frederick Henry, Prince of Orange used the castle as his headquarters. There is an anecdote about the dining table of Frederick Henry getting hit by a cannon ball while he was having lunch, and the prince complaining about this to the commander of 's-Hertogenbosch. The presence of Constantijn Huygens during the siege is a bit more relevant. He described his pleasant stay in a poem that describes the castle and grounds.

After 1629 the castle was in an area under control of the Dutch Republic. The Catholic elite was not expropriated, but it was excluded from office, leading to a severe decrease in its income. In 1680 his financial situation forced Hendrick Heym (?-c 1680) to sell the castle.

=== Van Beresteyn family (1680-1883) ===
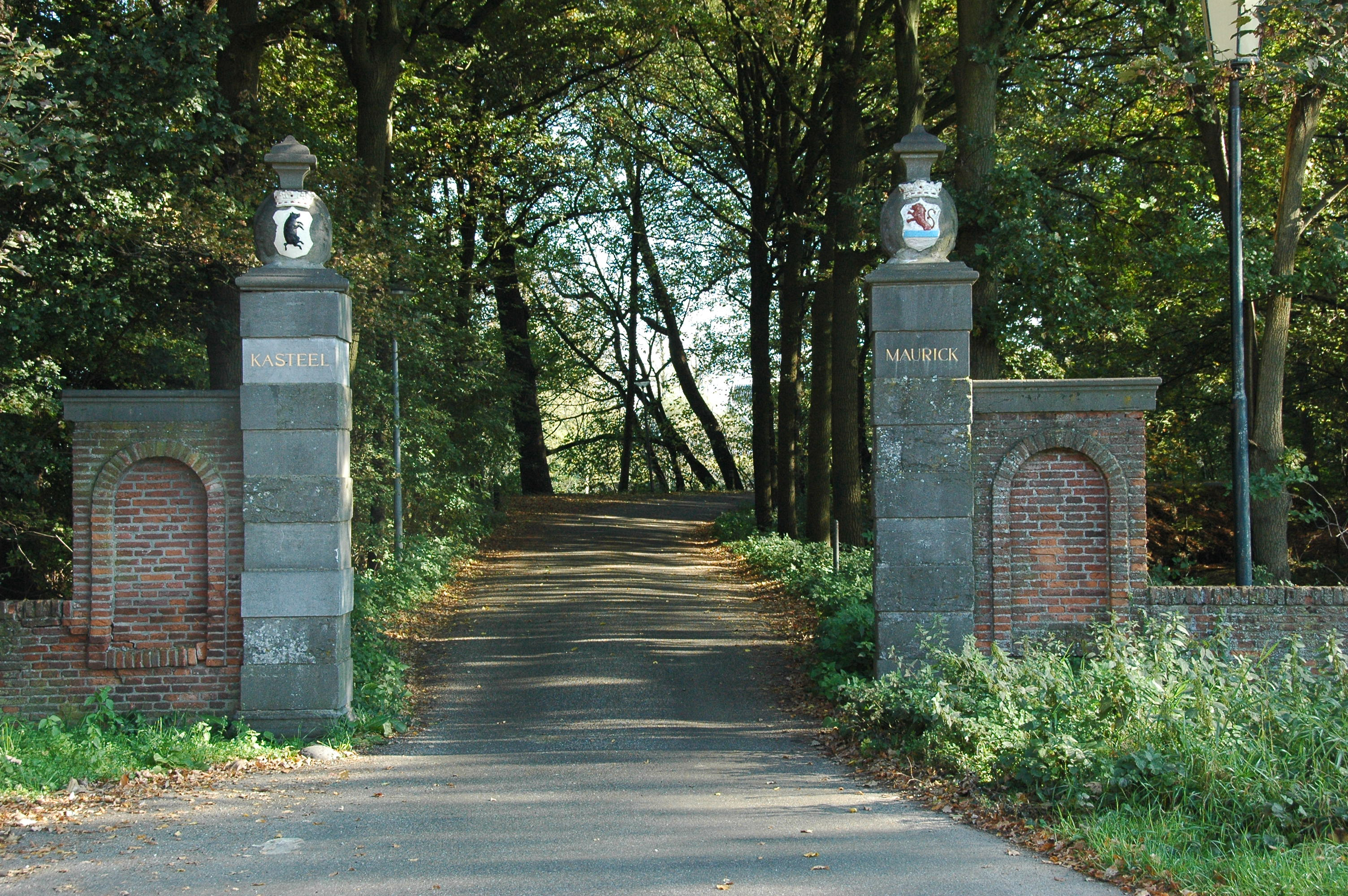
Castle gate with Beresteyn arms on the left, right that of Bruhl

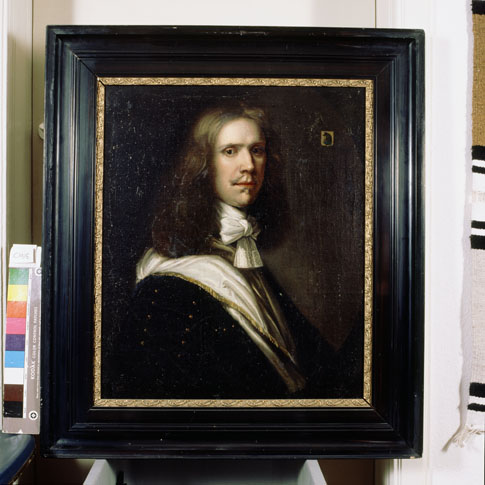
Thomas van Beresteyn (1647-1708)

The Beresteyn family is especially important for Maurick Castle. The Beresteyn family originated from Amsterdam and Delft, and chose the Protestant side. They became rich as traders and as officials of the Dutch East India Company. Christiaen van Beresteyn (1616 - 23 June 1680) studied in Leiden, and moved to 's-Hertogenbosch. The fact that Catholics were barred from office enabled him to he become pensionary of ’s-Hertogenbosch and Lord of Geffen. On 24 May 1645 he married Jacqueline Brouart (1627-1691). On 23 May 1680 Maurick was bought by the Van Beresteyn family, which kept the castle as their summer residence.

Christiaen's son Thomas van Beresteyn (1647-1708) became the next Lord of the manor after the death of his mother. Thomas was a captain in the army, steward of ecclesial goods in Kempenland and Oisterwijk and member of the council of ’s-Hertogenbosch. Thomas was first married to Dina Cornelia Tromp (1657-1699), a granddaughter of Maarten Tromp, second to Johanna Catharina de Groot (1664-1729), a granddaughter of Hugo Grotius.

Thomas was succeeded by a long line of Beresteyn's with legal schooling: Maarten Cornelis van Beresteyn (1695-1734), Christiaan Paulus van Beresteyn (1705-1758) and Catharina Wilhelmina Bruhl (1723-1794), Gijsbert van Beresteyn (1749-1810). The next generation was elevated to the Dutch nobility. When Jonkheer Gijsbert van Beresteyn (1804-1884) died Maurick Castle was auctioned.

In 1883 Adolph Joannes Mathias Mulder (1856-1936) was tasked to take measurements and make accurate drawings of Maurick castle. Mulder was a specialist in his work, and so the drawings of 1883 are very reliable.

Splinter describes that during the Beresteyn period there were three major phases of changes to the building: 1) The Gothic tower was shortened and the extension over the moat was removed, probably soon after the Beresteyn's took over. (From old pictures this Gothic tower seems to have been the highest part of the castle before it was demolished. Today a fragment is visible in west facing wall.) 2) The west wing facade on the south side was changed so it seemed to be similar to the part with the small overhanging towers, and the whole was plastered to appear as a classic manor. These changes probably took place soon after 1814. 3) The facade of the western wing was altered. This probably happened after 1840.

=== Van Lanschot ===
In 1884 Maurick Castle was bought by Augustinus J.A. van Lanschot (1834-1919). The Van Lanschot's were a banking family. Augustinus had the castle renovated, and used it as a summer residence. On the death of Augustinus his son August W.J. van Lanschot (1867-1923), inherited the castle. He was mayor of Vught from 1899 to 1923. His widow Gertrude Lagasse de Locht (1886-1963) then lived on Maurick till her death.

The renovation by Van Lanschot was done in 1891-1892 by Lambertus Christianus Hezenmans (1841-1909), a well known architect for restorations. One of the most important changes was the removal of the yellow plaster. The western wing was made somewhat higher and got a stepped gable. The roof was changed in some places, and the dormers got pointed roofs creating a more medieval look. The two towers of the gate building were heightened a bit creating a more irregular picture. The eastern wing also got a different roof and a stepped gable. Later Eduard Cuypers (1859-1927) was tasked to make some minor changes.

=== Commercial use ===
The Van Lanschot family sold the castle to N.V. tot Exploitatie van het Landgoed Maurick, which started a hotel and restaurant in the castle. Later it became a restaurant only. In 2007 N.V. Monumenten Fonds Brabant, a local organization to protect monuments became owner. Monumenten Fonds Brabant aims to finance her task by finding suitable users for her buildings. This again became a restaurant, the restaurant went broke in 2015, but was followed by another restaurant. The romantic location makes that many weddings use the castle.

== Park ==
Next to the castle is an estate of 23 hectares called landgoed "Maurick". It is owned by BV tot Exploitatie van het Landgoed Maurick and is situated on the edge of the Dommel valley. There is a forest of elms and ashes on the higher parts, and a carr on the lower part. It has one of the largest grey heron colonies of the Netherlands.

== The Maurick Rembrandts ==
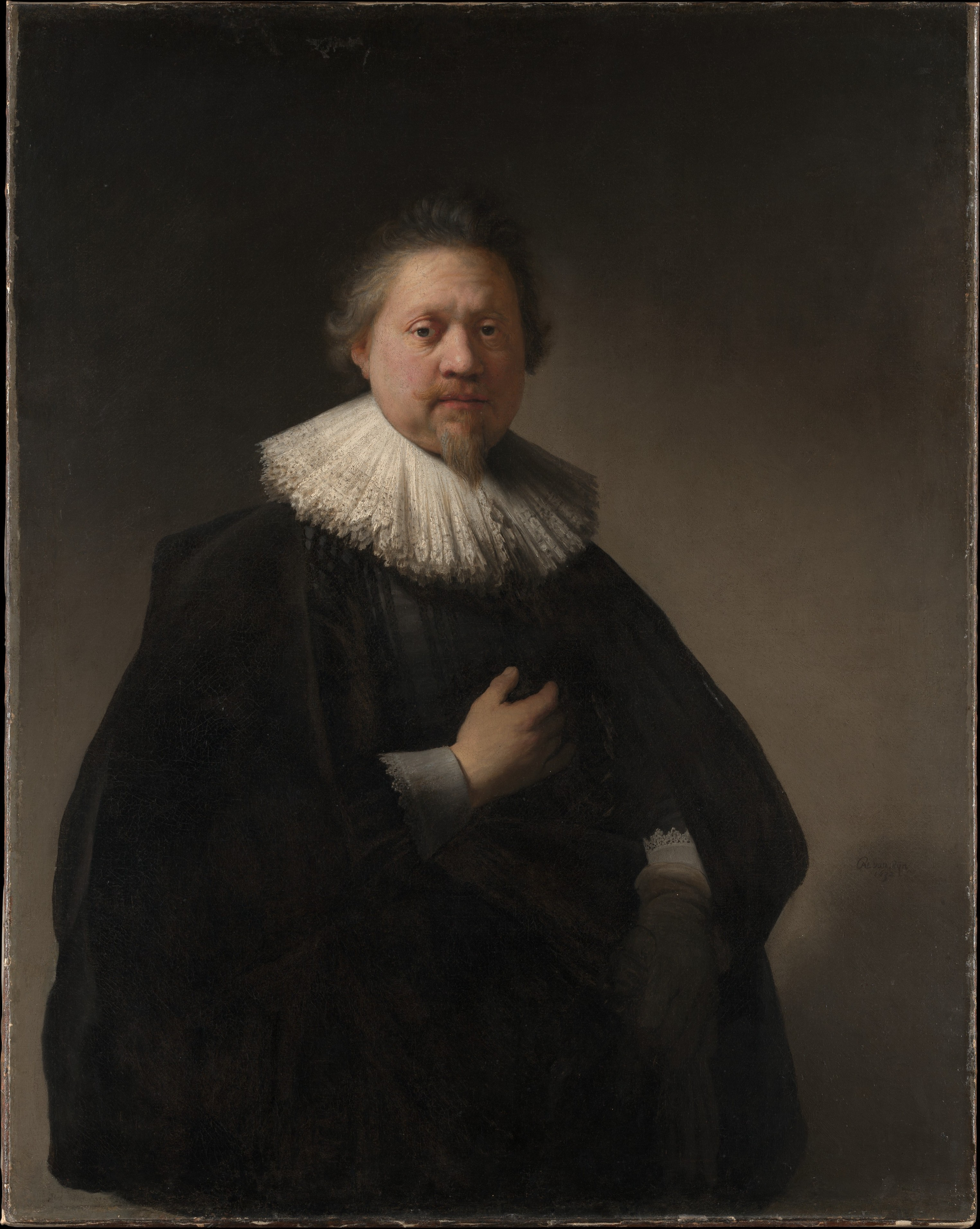
Probably Cornelis van Beresteyn (1586–1638) in 1632

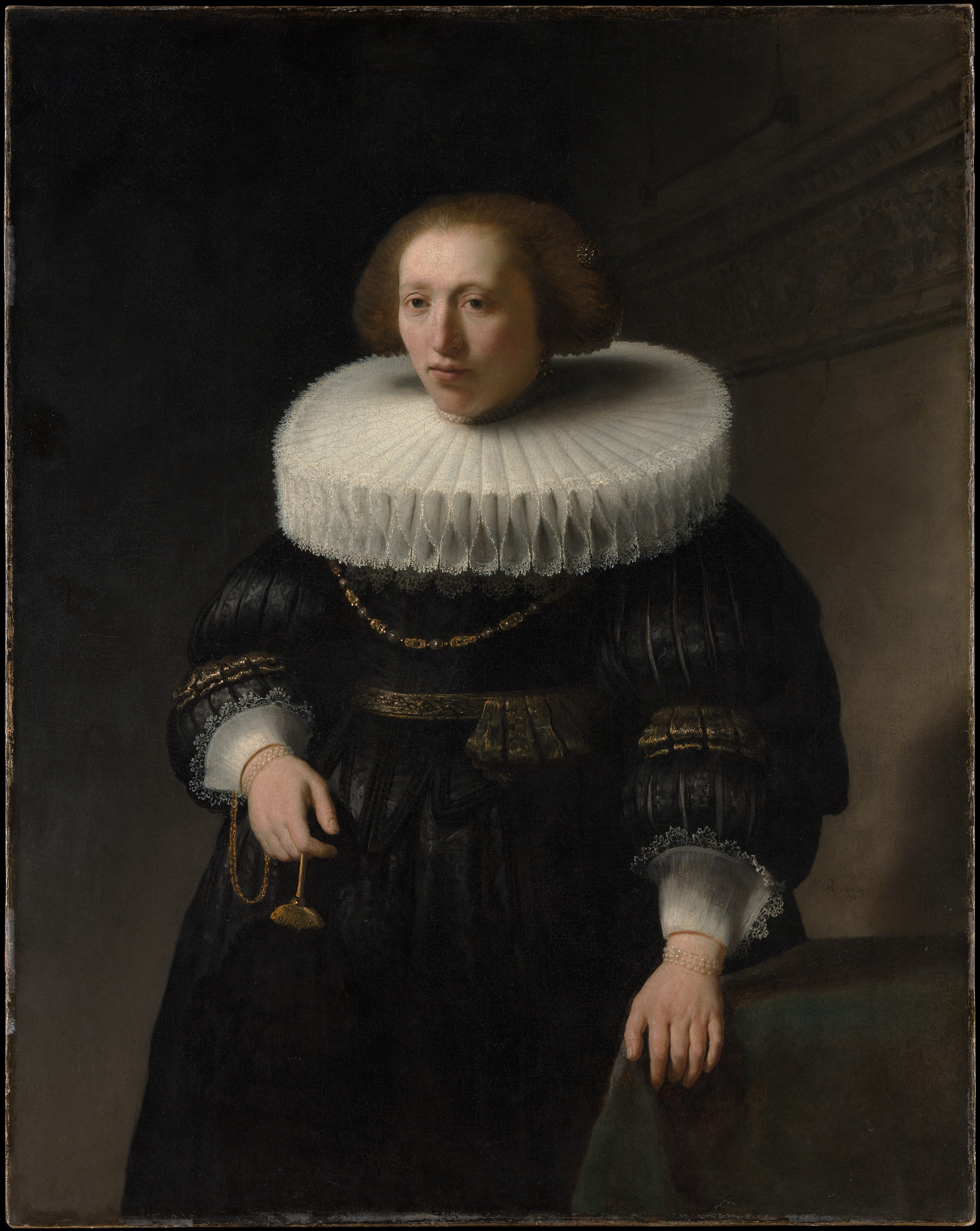
Probably Corvina van Hofdyck (1602–1667)

The rich Pauwels van Beresteyn (1548-1625) had at least two sons: Gijsbert (1576-1641) was the oldest. He continued his father's business and became an official for the Delft office of the Dutch East Indies Company (VOC). His oldest Christiaen van Beresteyn (1616 - 23 June 1680) moved south and founded the Van Beresteyn branch that would later settle on Maurick Castle (cf. above).

Pauwels second son Cornelis van Beresteyn (1586-1638) became mayor of Delft, and was an official for the Delft office of the VOC. He married Corvina van Hoffdijck, a marriage which made him Lord of Middelharnis. Their son Zacharias van Beresteyn van Hoffdijck (1623-1679) was successful in Delft politics, and became a member of the Gecommitteerde Raden of Holland. In 1674 Zacharias van Beresteyn married Agneta Deutz (1633-1692). They got one child, Cornelis Joseph van Beresteyn, baptized 26 December 1675. Cornelis died in childhood, and was buried on 24 February 1689. Agneta herself died on 13 February 1692. She left an estate worth 340,000 guilders, which was used to found Deutzen Hofje.

The two Rembrandts probably depict Cornelis van Beresteyn (1586–1638) and Corvina van Hofdyck (1602–1667). If that is the case, the paintings probably came to Maurick Castle after that of the branch family became extinct on the death of Agneta Deutz on 13 February 1692.

Jonkheer Gijsbert van Beresteyn was the last Van Beresteyn living on the castle. He died on 26 January 1884. When the Van Beresteyn family prepared to auction the castle and the works of art it contained, the two paintings were identified as made by Rembrandt.

In an 1884 auction the two paintings did not get sold. A family member made a high bid, but could not get it financed. At an auction in 1887 the paintings were bought by Jonkheer J. van Beresteyn from Gorssel. Via later transactions, the paintings ended up in the collection of Louisine Havemeyer and her husband Henry Osborne Havemeyer. They gave the Rembrandts to the Metropolitan Museum of Art, where they now reside.
