= Nycasius de Clibano =

Franco-Flemish singer and composer

Nycasius de Clibano (also Nicasius, Casijn) (fl. 1457 – 1497; d. 9-14 Oct. 1497) was a Franco-Flemish singer and composer of the Renaissance, probably active only in his homeland, the southern part of the Netherlands.

== Life and work ==
He was the father of the slightly better-known composer Jheronimus de Clibano, as well as Jan de Clibano, who is known only to have been a singer, not a composer. Nycasius probably was born in the south Netherlands, and he seems to have spent his entire career in 's-Hertogenbosch. He first appears in the records there in 1457, when he was brought in as a singer at the Illustrious Brotherhood of Our Blessed Lady (Illustre Lieve Vrouwe Broederschap). The next year he married, and in 1466 or 1467 he became a member of the Brotherhood, rising in the ecclesiastical ranks through the 1470s. Among his duties was recruiting new singers from other cities; a trip to Cambrai and Antwerp is documented during which he sought to find new members for the choir. In 1493 or 1494 he became the choirmaster. The accounts of the Brotherhood record his death between 9 and 14 October 1497, and in 1498 Matthaeus Pipelare took over his duties as choirmaster.

Only one work is known to be by Nycasius with reasonable certainty, a Credo Vilayge, which exists in multiple sources, although even this attribution has been questioned.

== Works ==
- Credo Vilayge (survives in multiple sources)
- Missa Et super nivem dealbabor (either by Nycasius or his son Jheronimus; listed as by "De clibano" in the Vatican source)
