= Great Church, 's-Hertogenbosch =

Great Church
- Grote Kerk
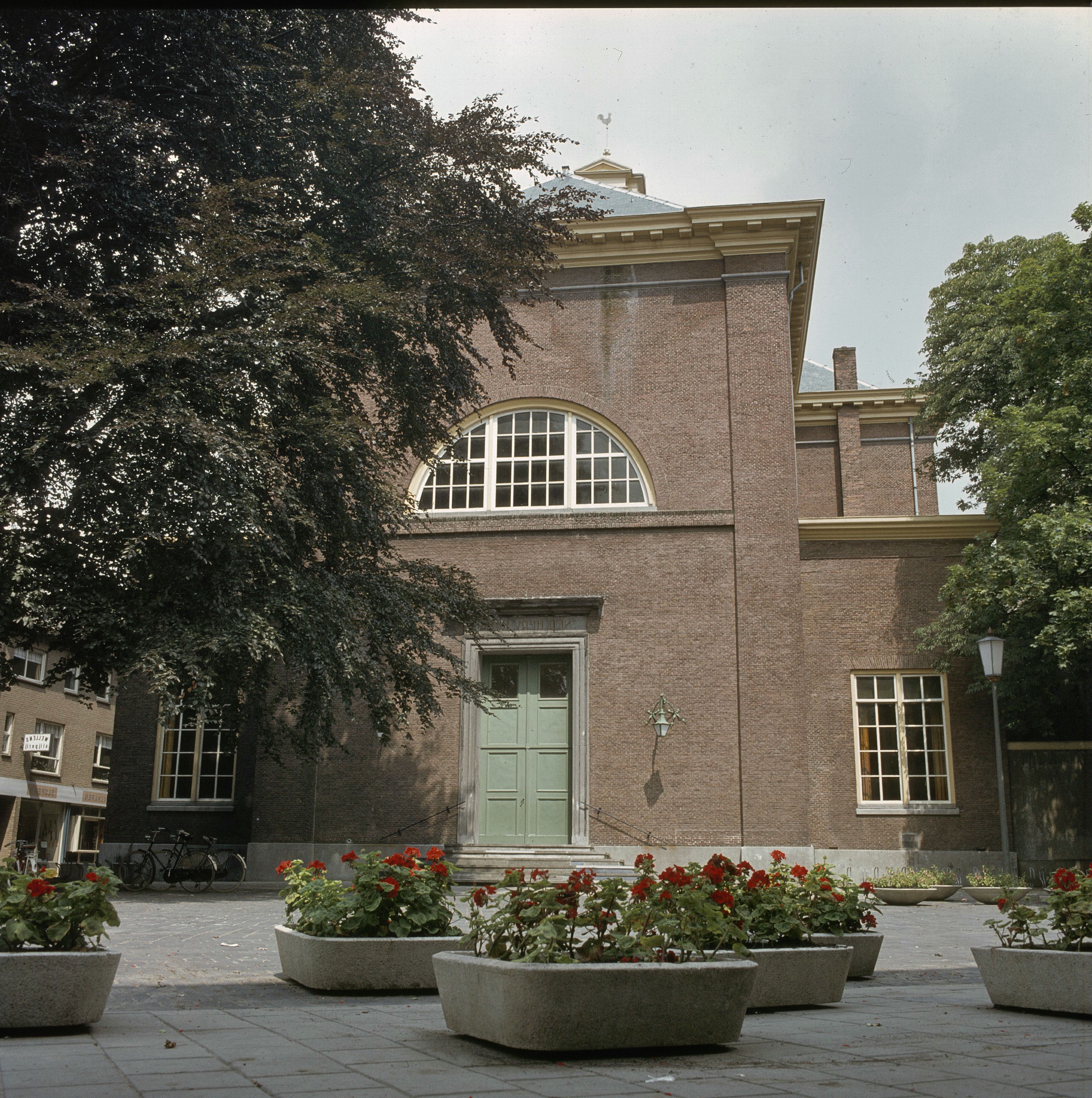

- North Brabant
- 51.688405°N 5.305405°E
- Location: 's-Hertogenbosch
- Denomination: Protestant Church
- Website: Protestantse gemeente 's-Hertogenbosch

Architecture
- Heritage designation: Rijksmonument
- Architect: Jan de Greef
- Years built: 1818-1821

The Great Church or Protestant Church is located in 's-Hertogenbosch. It is the main Protestant church of 's-Hertogenbosch.

== History ==
=== St. Anne's Chapel ===
At the place of the current church, there used to be the chapel of the Groot Ziekengasthuis. In 1482 the chapel was sold to the Brotherhood of St. Anne. The brotherhood demolished this chapel in 1523, and started to construct a new church building. This started with a high choir and a small tower. When the economy of the city slowed down, the choir was taken into use as a chapel. It had altars for Saint Anne, and the Holy Name of Jesus. After the Siege of 's-Hertogenbosch in 1629, the French Calvinist church took St. Anne's chapel into use. In 1799 lightning struck St. Anne's destroying the tower, and perhaps more than that. However, in 1805 the French Calvinist community in the town had shrunk to only 43 people.

=== The Protestants lose St. John's ===
On 10 May 1810 Napoleon ruled that the Catholic Church would get back St. John's Cathedral, and effected this ruling in the same year. The Protestants got St. Gertrude's near Orthen street. In 1818 William I of the Netherlands ruled that the Catholic Church would retain St. John's, but would pay an indemnity of 60,000 guilders to the Protestants.

=== Construction ===
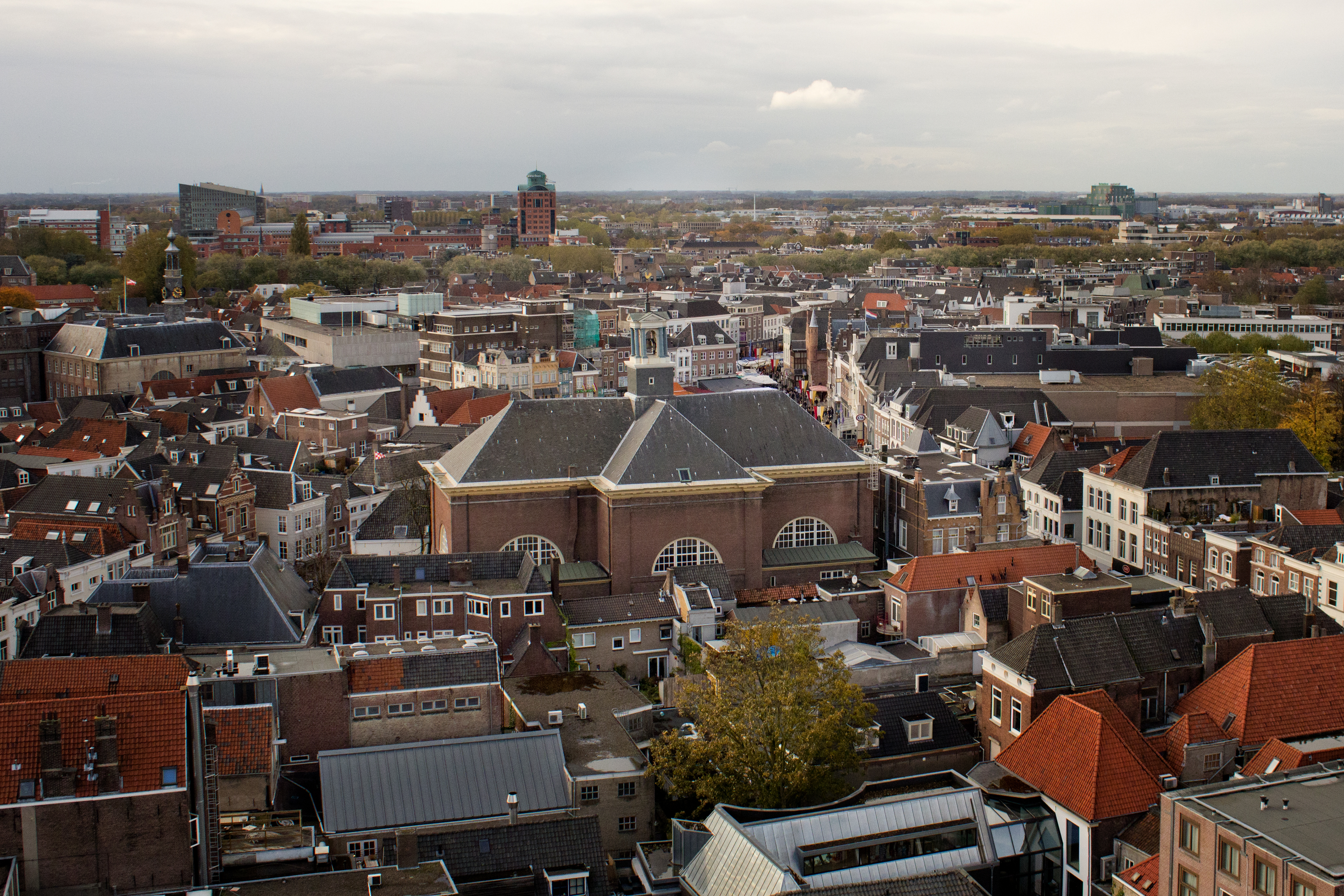
Hemmed in during 2013

In August 1818 the municipal government ruled that St. Anne's Chapel was a more suitable place for a new Protestant church than St. Gertrude's. The French Calvinists then moved to St. Gertrude's, and in 1847 to a new church, which would become the Lutheran Church. St. Anne's Chapel was then demolished by the Protestants.

The new church was designed by Jan de Greef. The tender for construction of the new church took place on 4 September 1819. It was subject to approval by the Secretary for Waterstaat, indicating that public funds were involved. This tender failed, so another one took place on 24 September. In June 1821 there was a tender for the benches, chairs, pulpit, organ gallery and other interior parts. This was subject to approval by the Protestant community.

The new church was christened on 6 January 1822 by Professor de Jongh, minister of the Protestant church. There was a special thanks to the king, 'who had given the church to the community'.

=== The building ===
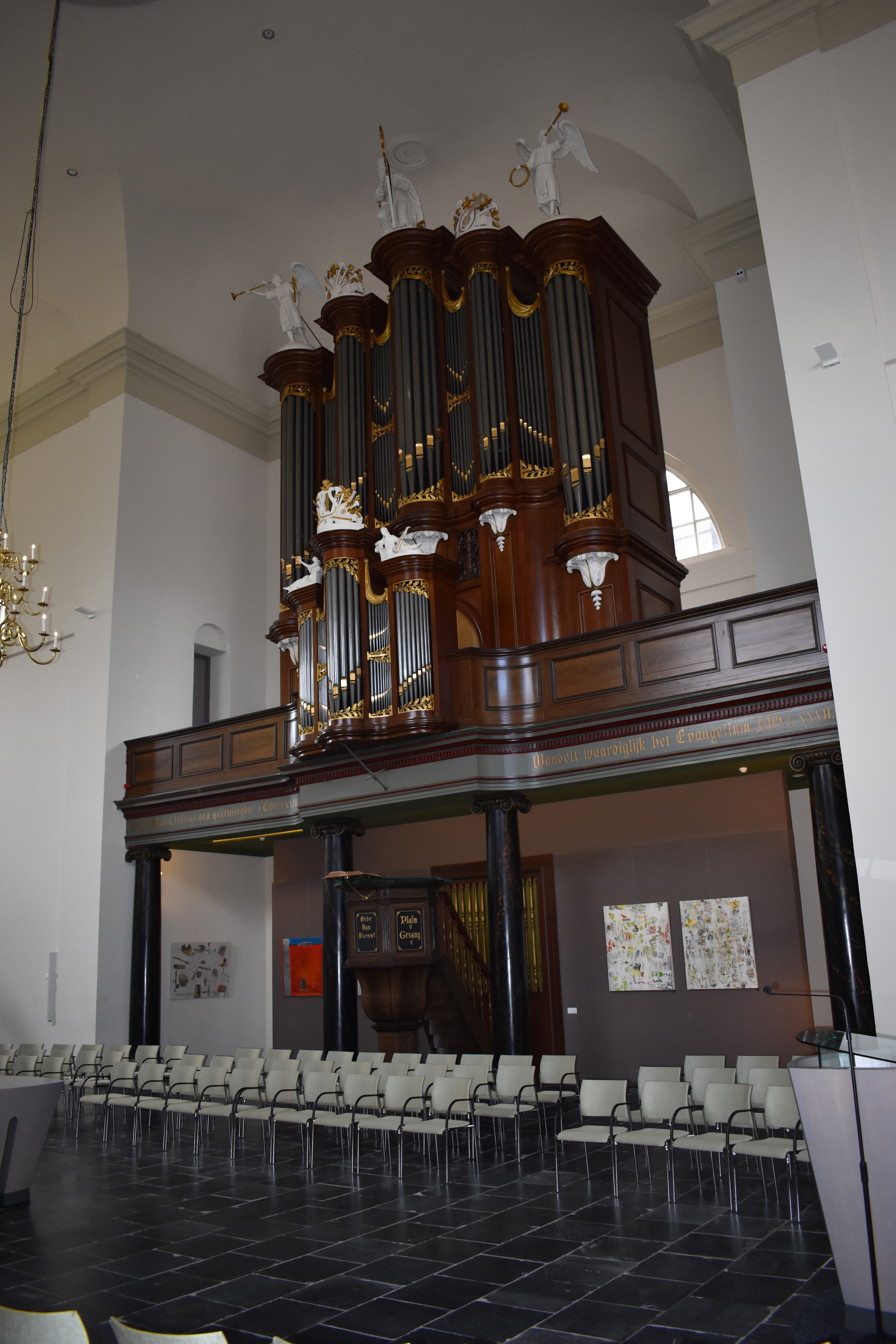
Interior after 1972

The building has been built in neo-classical style, with a conspicuous absence of ornament. The roof has a ridge turret in the center. The side of the church that is visible from St. Anne's place is the only side that still has the original plaster layer. On the other sides the façades are bare brick. Between 1900 and 1910 the windows in the southern façade were enlarged.

Before the south side of the church is a small place. Originally there was also a place north of the church, but this has been built over. On the west side St. Anne's place communicated to the northern square, so the church was only hemmed in on Gassel street when it was built.

In about 1970 the fence before the southern façade was removed, and in the 1980s the stairs before this entrance were widened and modernized

The interior was radically changed by a renovation in 1972–1973. The organ and pulpit are all that remains from the original furniture, designed by A. Goekoop when the church was built. There is also a copper baptismal font holder made by Cornelis Brem in 1718, which was brought from St. John's. The organ has been built by Bätz, and was taken into use in 1831. It was restored in 1962.

In 2015 another interior reconstruction followed, adding underfloor heating, new bathrooms and even a kitchen. Nowadays the church is also used for many (cultural) activities that are not directly related to religion.
