= Jan Heyns =

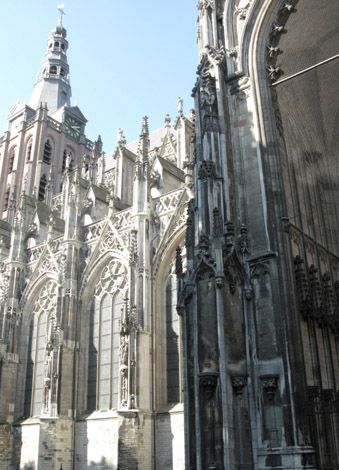
St. John's Cathedral, 's-Hertogenbosch.

Johannes "Jan" Heyns (14?? in Bruges – 1516 in 's-Hertogenbosch) was a Flemish-Brabantic architect.

Originally from Bruges, Jan Heyns was active in 's-Hertogenbosch from 1495. There he became the architect in charge of building the St. John's Cathedral. The construction of the cathedral was then in full force. Under Jan Heyns' direction the chapel of the Illustrious Brotherhood of Our Blessed Lady, a society from 's-Hertogenbosch that was dedicated to the veneration of Saint Mary, was completed in 1496, and in 1505 the entire preceding Roman church of St. John, excluding the tower, was demolished to make room for the nave of the new cathedral. As a reward for his service, Heyns was admitted to the Illustrious Brotherhood as a sworn-in brother. Only persons from the highest levels of society or persons that distinguished themselves were allowed to be sworn into the brotherhood.

Heyns' membership of the brotherhood meant that he belonged to the laity - though in the lowest rank - and he was thereby required to organize meals at his home for his fellow brothers. He also carried out other services for the Brotherhood; In this capacity he, along with fellow Brother Jeroen Bosch, advised the sculptor Adriaen van Wesel on the size of the altarpiece for the Brotherhood that the sculptor was to make in 1508-1509.

Jan Heyns did not live to see the completion of the Sint-Jan, as he died during a pleurisy epidemic that struck 's-Hertogenbosch from 1515 to 1516. He was. His brother-in-law was the printmaker Alaert du Hamel, who had preceded him as architect of the Sint-Jan. The Maurick Castle near Vught, built from 1504 to 1509, is also attributed to Jan Heyns.

== Sources ==
- Dijck, G.C.M. van (2001) Op zoek naar Jheronimus van Aken alias Bosch. De feiten. Familie, vrienden en opdrachtgevers, Zaltbommel: Europese Bibliotheek, pp. 53, 55, 57 (ISBN 90-288-2687-4).
