= Lutheran Church, 's-Hertogenbosch =

Lutheran Church
- Waalse Kerk
- Lutherse Kerk
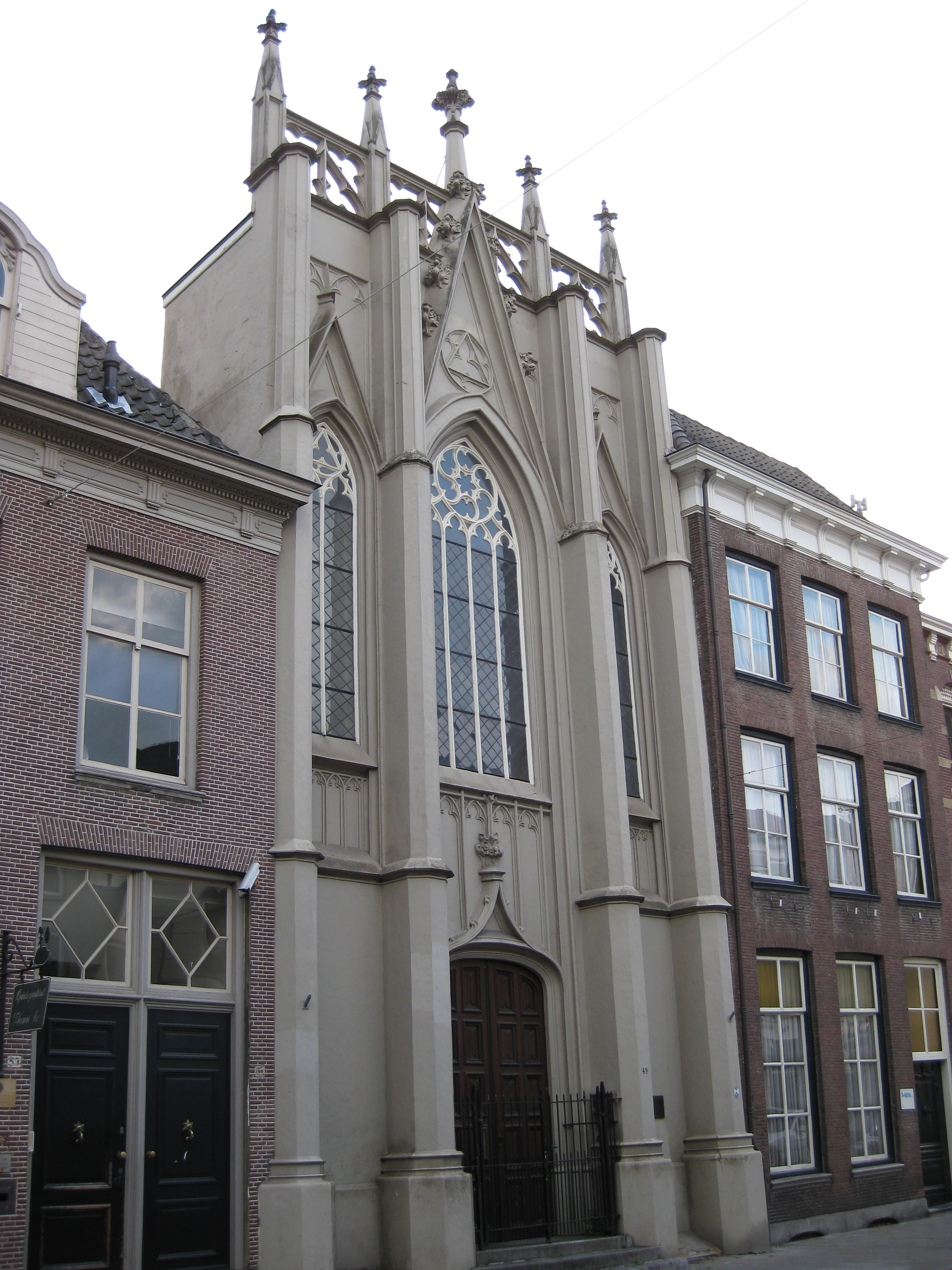
- The Lutheran Church in 's-Hertogenbosch

- North Brabant
- 51.686527°N 5.305569°E
- Location: 's-Hertogenbosch
- Country: Netherlands
- Denomination: Lutheranism
- Previous denomination: French Calvinism
- Website: https://www.wijdoendingen.nl/ (current user)

Architecture
- Heritage designation: Rijksmonument
- Architect: Arnoldus van Veggel
- Architectural type: Neo-Gothic
- Years built: 1847

The Lutheran Church of 's-Hertogenbosch is a former church in 's-Hertogenbosch.

== History ==
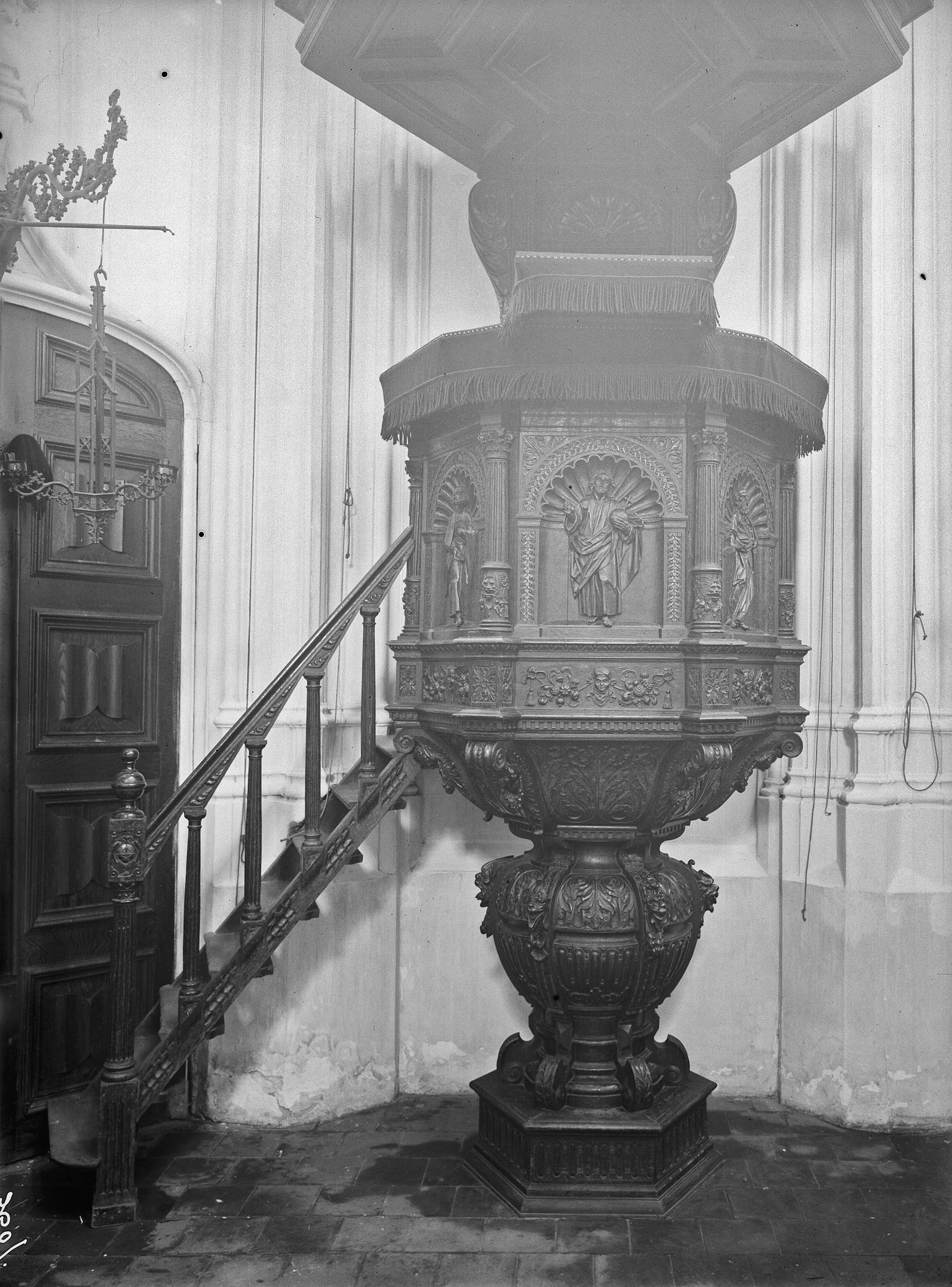
The pulpit from 1625

=== Previous buildings at the site ===
In 1619, there was a brewery called De Vergulde Bierwagen (the gilded beer wagon) at the site. The building continued to carry this name after it had ceased to be a brewery. The house had a wooden façade.

The French Calvinist community of 's-Hertogenbosch had come into the city after the Siege of 's-Hertogenbosch. It first used St. Anne's chapel, and after that was broken down in 1819, it moved to St. Gertrude's.

=== Construction ===
The current church was built for the French Calvinist community in 's-Hertogenbosch in 1847. It bought the former brewery, and on 8 June 1846 the construction of the church was tendered. Plans were available with the architect and surveyor A. van Veggel. On 19 December 1847 the new church was consecrated.

=== Lutheran Church ===
In 1956 the Evangelical Lutheran Church took the current church into use. It had a previous church in the same street. In 2004 this denomination merged into the Protestant Church in the Netherlands.

== The Building ==
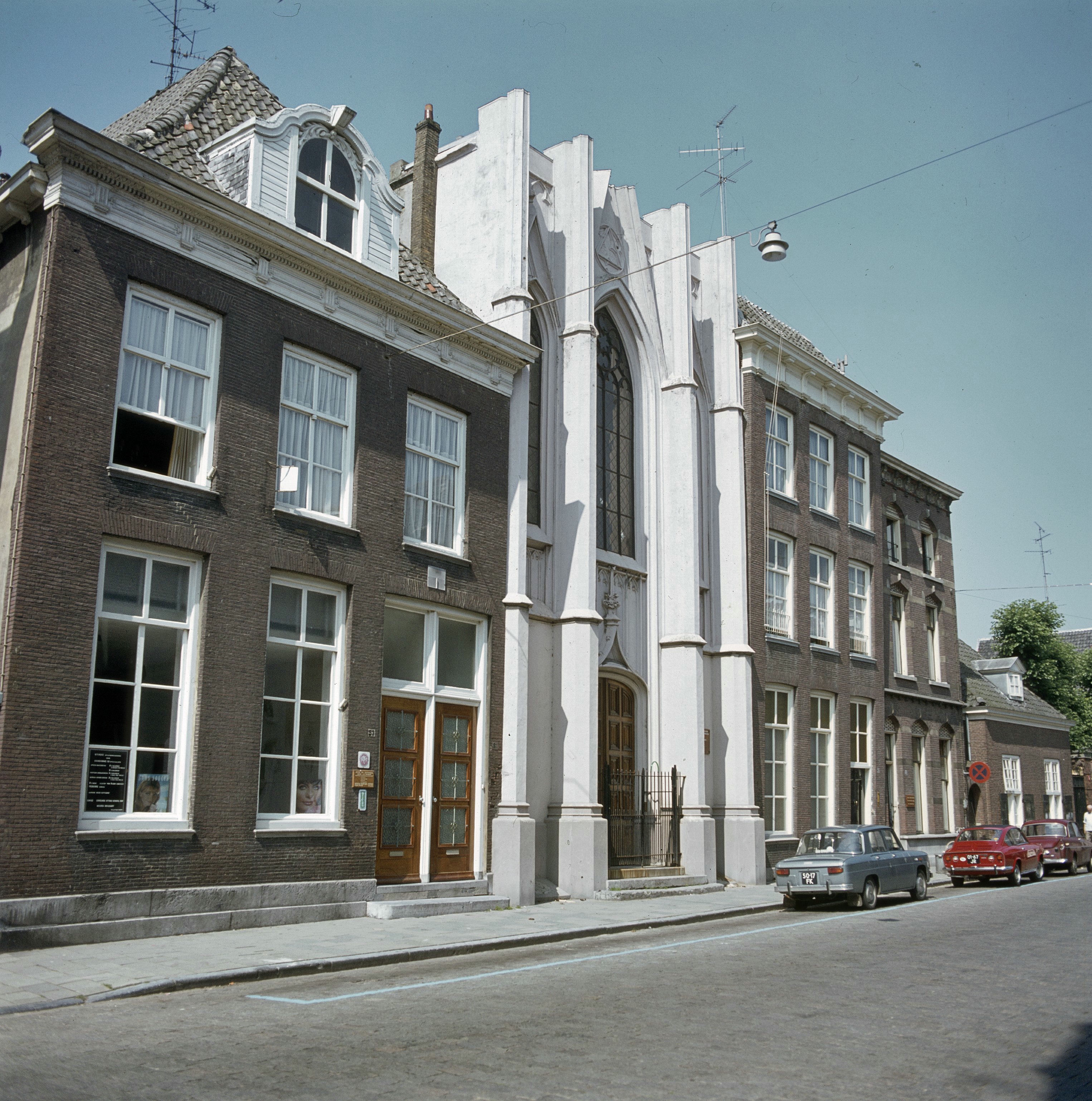
The church without pinnacles

The architect designed the church in Gothic Revival architecture. An optical comparison with the Swan Brothers' House is interesting. The pinnacles on the façade were removed in 1890, when they became a danger to passers-by. The church was renovated in 1996. The pinnacles might have returned at that time.

On the inside the church had groin vaults from plaster. The windows in the side walls are high-up because of the buildings to the sides.

Carved oak banks with wrought iron neo-Gothic decorations, candelabras, and prayer book holders date from the time of construction. The oak pulpit dates from about 1625, and originates from the Old St. Peter church that was demolished in 1645-1646. The copper lectern dates from 1690. The sounding board dates from 1844. The organ from 1780 was probably built by J.S. Strümphler. In 2014 this organ was moved to the Protestant Church of 's-Hertogenbosch.

A peculiarity is the grave of Anthoni Gunther, Prince of Holstein-Beck. Anthoni was one of the highest ranking officers in the Dutch Army, and became governor of 's-Hertogenbosch in 1733. He died in 1744 and was then buried in the Old Lutheran Church of 's-Hertogenbosch. In 1956 this Old Lutheran Church was demolished, and the grave of Anthoni also moved to the current church.

== Current status ==
After the Lutheran Church was no longer used as a church, ownership was transferred to Monumenten Beheer Brabant (MBB) in ultimo 2008. This organization finds suitable uses for monuments that are in line with their historic value. It is now the home of Wijdoendingen, a marketing company that focuses on Experience Design.
