= Jheronimus de Clibano =

Franco-Flemish Renaissance composer and singer

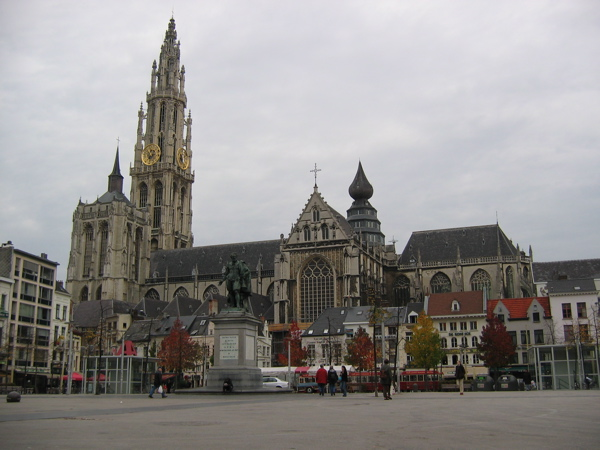
Clibano probably worked at the Cathedral of Our Lady in Antwerp.

Jheronimus de Clibano (Jherome Du Four) (c. 1459 – between March 26 and May 16, 1503) was a Franco-Flemish composer and singer of the Renaissance. He was a member of the Habsburg Grande chapelle, the distinguished choir of Philip I of Castile, at the same time as Pierre de La Rue.

== Life ==
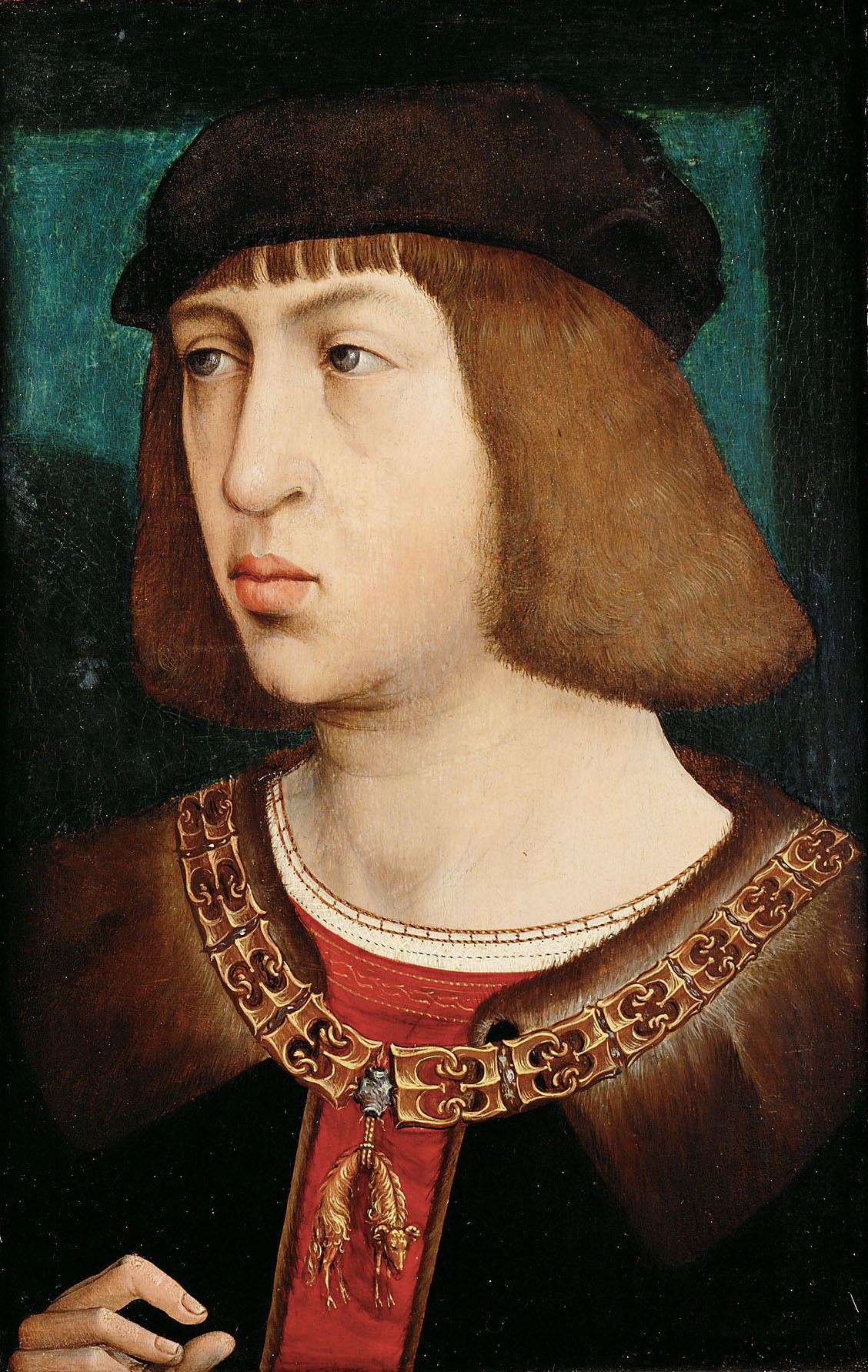
Philip I of Castile was one of Clibano's employers.

Clibano was part of a musical family: his father, Nycasius de Clibano and brother Jan de Clibano were also singers; while his father was known to be a composer, Jan was not. Jheronimus was born in 's-Hertogenbosch. His exact early training is not known, but it is reasonable to assume he learned music from his father, and he likely received the training in a local choir school common to composers and singers of the time. Between November 1484 and early 1488, he was a singer at the Illustrious Confraternity of Our Lady (Illustre Lieve Vrouwe Broederschap) in 's-Hertogenbosch. He moved to Bruges, where he was appointed succentor at St. Donatian's Cathedral. Records there indicate he was in trouble for negligence, and he was removed from his post in 1497. In 1499 he likely worked at the Cathedral of Our Lady (Antwerp) in Antwerp, replacing another notoriously unreliable employee, the renowned composer Jacob Obrecht.

Philip I of Castile hired Clibano into his Grande chapelle as a singer on August 6, 1500, on the same date as Alexander Agricola, a much more famous composer. Pay lists for the period indicate that Clibano rose quickly, overtaking Agricola, but never reaching the level of Pierre de La Rue. While in the employ of the Grande chapelle, he went to Spain, however he died during the trip back, possibly at Lyon, or one of the other places that they visited on their travels between March 25, 1503 (when he was known to be alive) and May 15 (when records indicate that he was deceased).

== Music ==
Three works are attributed to Clibano. The first, and most reliable, is a four-voice motet, Festivitatem dedicationis, which was written for the dedication of a church. The other pieces are a cantus-firmus mass based on Asperges me, Missa Et super nivem dealbabor, and also a Credo de villagiis (published by Ottaviano Petrucci in 1505). Both the mass and the Credo may actually be by Clibano's father, Nycasius.
