= Illustrious Brotherhood of Our Blessed Lady =

14th-century religious confraternity

The Illustrious Brotherhood of Our Blessed Lady (Illustre Lieve Vrouwe Broederschap) was a religious confraternity founded in 1318 in 's-Hertogenbosch to promote the veneration of the Mother of God. The brotherhood was organized around a carved wooden image of the Virgin Mary in St John’s Cathedral in 's-Hertogenbosch. The Brotherhood had two types of members: ordinary members and sworn members, also called 'swan-brethren' because they used to donate a swan for the yearly banquet. Sworn members were clerics in principle; in fact they were often chosen among the nobility, the magistrates, etc. As a result, the Brotherhood also functioned as an important social network.

== Well-known members ==
- Hieronymus Bosch (c. 1450 – 1516), painter.
- Nycasius de Clibano (? – 1497), singer and composer
- Jheronimus de Clibano (c. 1459 – 1503), singer and composer
- Jan Heyns (? – 1516), architect
- Frans Crabbe van Espleghem (c. 1480 – 1553), Flemish artist
- Jan van Wintelroy (? – 1576), composer and choirmaster
- Matthaeus Pipelare (c. 1450 – c. 1515), composer and choirmaster
- Frederik van Egmond (c. 1470 – 1539), Count of Buren and lord of IJsselstein
- William the Silent (1533 – 1584), leader of the Dutch Revolt
