= St. John's Cathedral ('s-Hertogenbosch) =

Cathedral Basilica of St. John the Evangelist
- Kathedrale Basiliek van Sint Jan Evangelist (Dutch); Sint-Janskathedraal (Dutch)
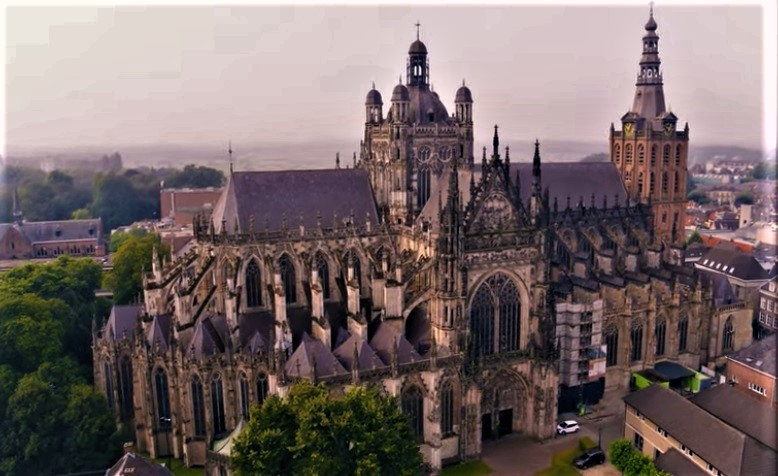
- St. John's Cathedral
- Cathedral Basilica of St. John the Evangelist
- 51°41′17″N 5°18′27″E
- Location: 's-Hertogenbosch
- Country: Netherlands
- Denomination: Catholic
- Previous denomination: Reformed (1629–1810)
- Website: sint-jan.nl

History
- Status: Cathedral
- Dedication: John the Evangelist

Architecture
- Functional status: Active
- Heritage designation: Rijksmonument
- Architect(s): Alaert du Hamel and Lambert Hezenmans among others
- Architectural type: Gothic
- Style: Brabantine Gothic
- Years built: 1220–1530; 1860–1939 (restoration); 1949–present (restoration)

Specifications
- Capacity: 1,500
- Length: 115 meters (377 ft 3.6 in)
- Width: 62 meters (203 ft 4.9 in)
- Height: 73 meters (239 ft 6.0 in)
- Materials: 33 types of natural stone and brick

Administration
- Archdiocese: Utrecht
- Diocese: 's-Hertogenbosch

The Cathedral Church of St. John (Sint-Janskathedraal), is a Catholic cathedral in 's-Hertogenbosch, North Brabant. The cathedral serves as the seat for the bishopric of 's-Hertogenbosch. The church is considered to be the largest cathedral in the Netherlands, and one of the greatest examples of Brabantine Gothic architecture in Europe.

== History ==
=== The Romanesque church ===
Construction of the first parish church is thought to have started in 1220 as a small Romanesque parish church dedicated to St. John. The construction of the church was ordered by Henry I, Duke of Brabant and stood on the same spot where the current cathedral now stands. In 1366, it was elevated to a collegiate church. Unlike many other cathedrals around the same time lost to fire such as Noyon Cathedral in France and Lincoln Cathedral in England, the parish church survived intact with no major destructions.

=== The Gothic church ===
In 1340, reconstruction was initiated to accommodate the growing religious presence in the city. The cathedral would be demolished and rebuilt entirely in a Gothic architecture style. The apse chapels and outer choir aisles were completed first, followed by the transept and choir in 1450. Despite these ambitious plans, the bases of the Romanesque towers were kept, requiring the new nave to be shorter than originally planned due to budget constraints. Construction had finished around 1525.

In 1584, a major fire destroyed most of the original roof, organ, and the central tower, which was later replaced by a Cupola. In the later sixteenth century the Reformation inspired the Catholic church to implement its own reforms. In 1559 St. John's became the cathedral of the new diocese of 's-Hertogenbosch. The parish of St. John used to contain almost the whole city. In 1569 it became smaller by splitting of new parishes centered on St. Catherine's Church, Old St. James' Church and Old St. Peter's Church.

=== Protestant Church ===
After the Siege of 's-Hertogenbosch in 1629, the exercise of the Catholic religion was banned. Priests had to perform their ministry in secret and were often on the run from the authorities. The bishopric of 's-Hertogenbosch got Joseph de Bergaigne ordained as new bishop in 1641, but this was done in Brussel. After the 1648 Peace of Westphalia the diocese became an Apostolic vicariate and no new bishops were appointed.

For St. John's, 1629 meant that it was given to the Protestant Church in the city. The number of Protestants in 's-Hertogenbosch then grew back to about 20% of the population. This would prove to be a too a small base to maintain all churches. St. John's came to be in a heavily dilapidated state, partly due a lack of funds to maintain the building.

=== French period ===
The French period began in 1794, when the French Revolutionary army conquered ’s-Hertogenbosch. ’s-Hertogenbosch thus became a part of the Batavian Republic. Catholic citizens got equal rights, and North Brabant got an equal representation in the government. However, this did not mean that the Protestants lost ownership of St. John's. The city was added to the French Empire in March 1810.

In April 1810 Napoleon decreed a new bishopric of ’s-Hertogenbosch with almost the same borders as current North Brabant province. Mathias Franciscus van Camp was his second appointee, and the first to reach the city. When Napoleon visited the town in 1810, he restored the building to the Catholics. Van Camp also visited the city in December, and took up residence in the city, but his services in St. John's were generally boycotted by the believers, who stayed loyal to Rome, which did not recognize the diocese.

=== 19th Century ===
In 1813, the Prussians defeated the French, and the city became part of the United Kingdom of the Netherlands. On 11 December 1816 King William I issued a royal decree that the Cathedral was to be in Catholic hands indefinitely, but that the Catholics had to pay an indemnity to the Protestants. The Great Church was built as new church for the Protestants in 1819-1822.

In 1830, another fire damaged the western tower, which was repaired by 1842. In 1840 the Cathedral became the church of the Parish again. While the Catholic citizens had gained equals rights in 1795, their religious liberty did not extend to their organization. The Pope was perceived as a foreign power, and an act like appointing a bishop as an infringement on national sovereignty. The constitution of 1848 then put an end to the authority of the government to effectively block Catholics organizations. There were many projects to restore the bishoprics, and to appoint bishops. As a curiosity: 's-Hertogenbosch was seen as a candidate to become the archbishopric, because of the presence of St. John's church.

In 1853 The episcopal hierarchy was restored by Pope Pius IX, who restored the hierarchy in the Netherlands as a whole. The diocese of ’s-Hertogenbosch was made suffragan to the Archdiocese of Utrecht and the Cathedral became the episcopal seat of the Bishopric of ’s-Hertogenbosch. Ordained as the first bishop of ’s-Hertogenbosch was Msgr. Johannes Zwijsen who endeavoured to bring back the Miraculous Statue of Our Lady of ’s-Hertogenbosch. The statue was brought to Brussels during the reformation but was carried back to ’s-Hertogenbosch in a procession. On 27 December 1853 it was placed back in St. John's, and on 31 December 1853 it was placed in the Maria choir.

In 1866, the Renaissance-style marble rood-loft from 1610-1613 was removed from the cathedral because it obstructed the congregation's view of the high altar and because its style clashed with that of the Gothic church. In 1871, the rood-loft was acquired by the Victoria and Albert Museum in London from the art dealer Murray Marks who had purchased it from the cathedral authorities. It was rebuilt on the south wall of the Cast Court before being reconstructed in Gallery 50 in 1923-4. This controversial sale was the reason for the establishment of monument protection policies in the Netherlands.

=== 20th Century ===
The first restoration of the cathedral lasted from 1859 to 1946. A second attempt at restoration was executed from 1961 to 1985. The third and most recent restoration started in 1998 and was completed in 2010, costing more than 48 million euro. Major parts of the building are once again covered by scaffolding erected for restoration of the outer stonework, but also, ironically, to remedy mistakes made by earlier restoration attempts.

In 1985, the cathedral received the honorary title Basilica Minor from Pope John Paul II.

In 2000 St. John's Cathedral was designated as a so-called ‘Kanjermonument’ (whopper-monument, loosely translated). This label makes it easier to receive financial support from the Dutch government.

== The building ==
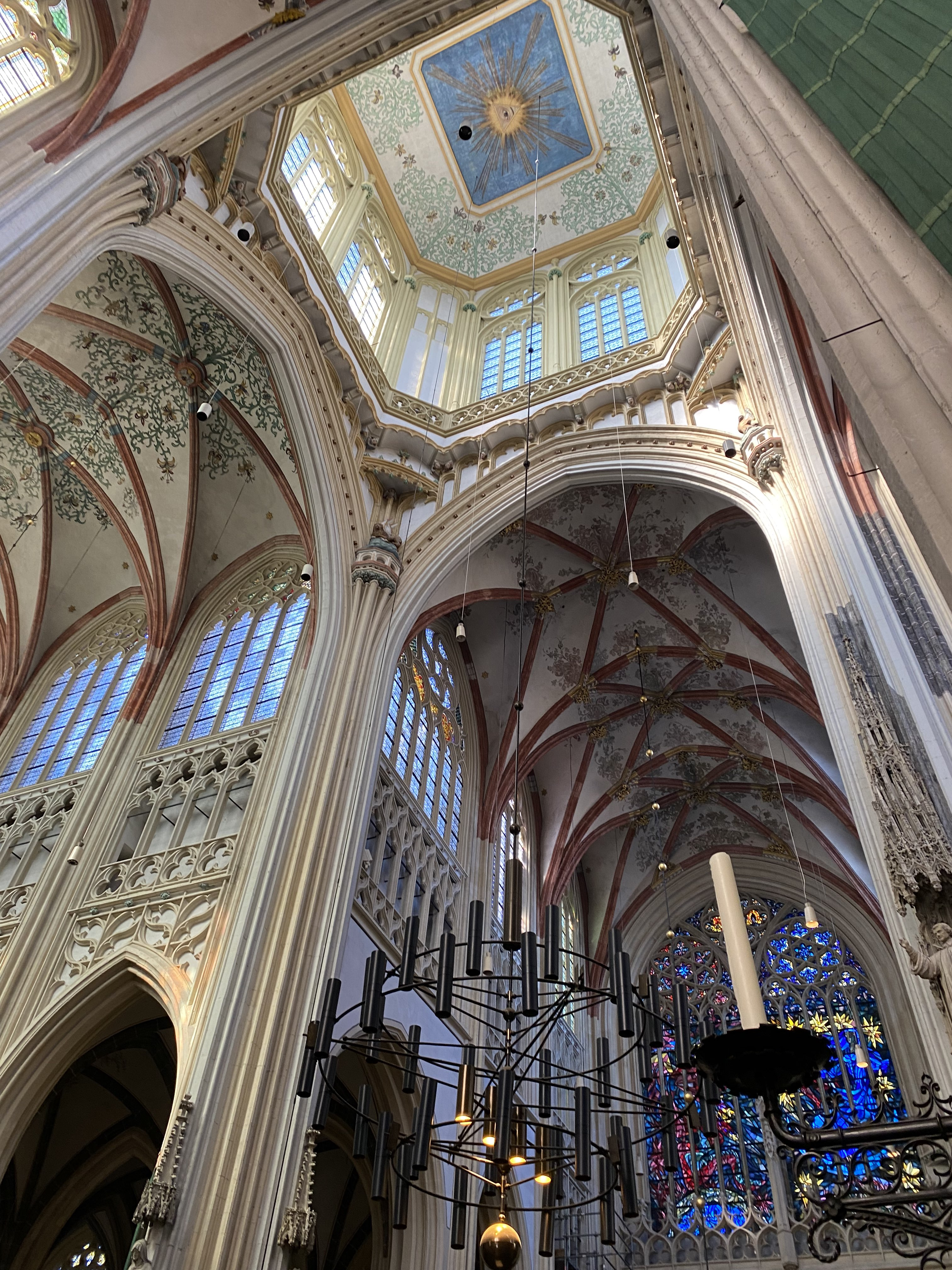
Interior of the crossing tower of St. John's Cathedral

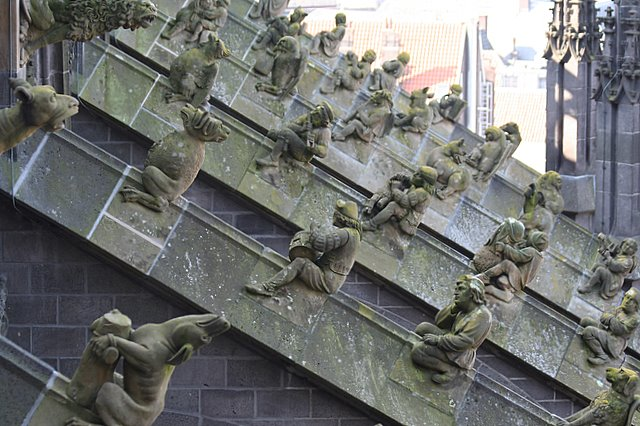
Statuettes on some of the cathedral's flying buttresses

=== Brabantine Gothic ===
St. John's cathedral represents the zenith of Brabantine Gothic in the current Netherlands.

=== Structure and dimensions ===
The cathedral has a total length of 115 metres (377 ft) and a width of 62 metres (203 ft). The Gothic nave has five aisles, that is two on each side of the nave in the narrow sense of the word. These aisles continue under the transepts. The aisles then continue under the choir. Along the apse, only the inner aisles continue. These give access to 6-7 apse chapels that are located in the way of the lacking outer aisles. Originally there was a third aisle on both the north and south side of the choir. The one on the south side was dedicated to Saint Nicholas, and was finished by 1405-1406, and is still standing.

The tower is a remnant of the first romanesque church. Which means that it is older than the nave and choir. At the feet of the tower is a part of the church that is built in tuff. The part south of the tower, with the small corner tower, was not built before the fourteenth century. North of the tower is the Chapel for 'Our sweet lady of 's-Hertogenbosch' in Dutch: Zoete Lieve Vrouw van Den Bosch. It might date from 1268, as was historically claimed, but it might also have been built as late as the mid-fourteenth century.

The tower reaches a height of 73 metres (240 ft). It is the highest for a Catholic church in the Netherlands. Underneath the clock tower there is a carillon. The clockwork can be found at the top of the Romanesque tower.

=== Chapel of the Illustrious Brotherhood / Holy Sacrament ===
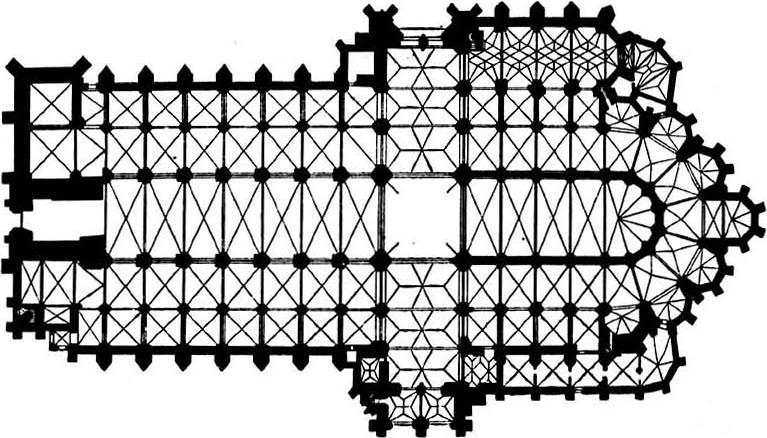
Ground plan with vaults

The Illustrious Brotherhood of Our Blessed Lady maintained a chapel for Mary before the church got its current form. In 1374 this had a tower with an attic. Shortly after the construction of the third aisle on the southern side of the choir in 1405-1406, a similar third aisle was planned on the northern side. The Brotherhood deemed this northern third aisle to be too small, but had to accept it. This brotherhood chapel was completed in 1426.

In 1478-1479 the brotherhood wanted to start construction of a new chapel. This is the current the Chapel of the Holy Sacrament. This involved demolishing parts of the northern wall of the chapel it had in use, but permission to do this was only obtained in 1485. The design for this new chapel was made by Alart du Hamel, who also led its construction till 1488, when he was in practice replaced by Jan Heyns. In 1494 the new chapel was consecrated. In 1516-1517 the interior was finished, so that it could be whitened.

The Illustrious Brotherhood Chapel is the most independent creation by Du Hamel and Heyns. The architects were bound to the height of the vaults of St. John's and the space between its bays. However, they were free in their design of the flamboyant buttresses, which appear as luxurious candelabrums. This freedom also applied to using a complex rib vault in the chapel. In the early sixteenth century, similar chapels on the side of the choir became a trend for large city churches. Such a chapel at the Grote Kerk in Breda was probably designed by Jan Heyns. The chapel at Cathedral of St. Michael and St. Gudula was built after requesting the drawings of the 's-Hertogenbosch chapel.

=== Angel with a mobile phone ===
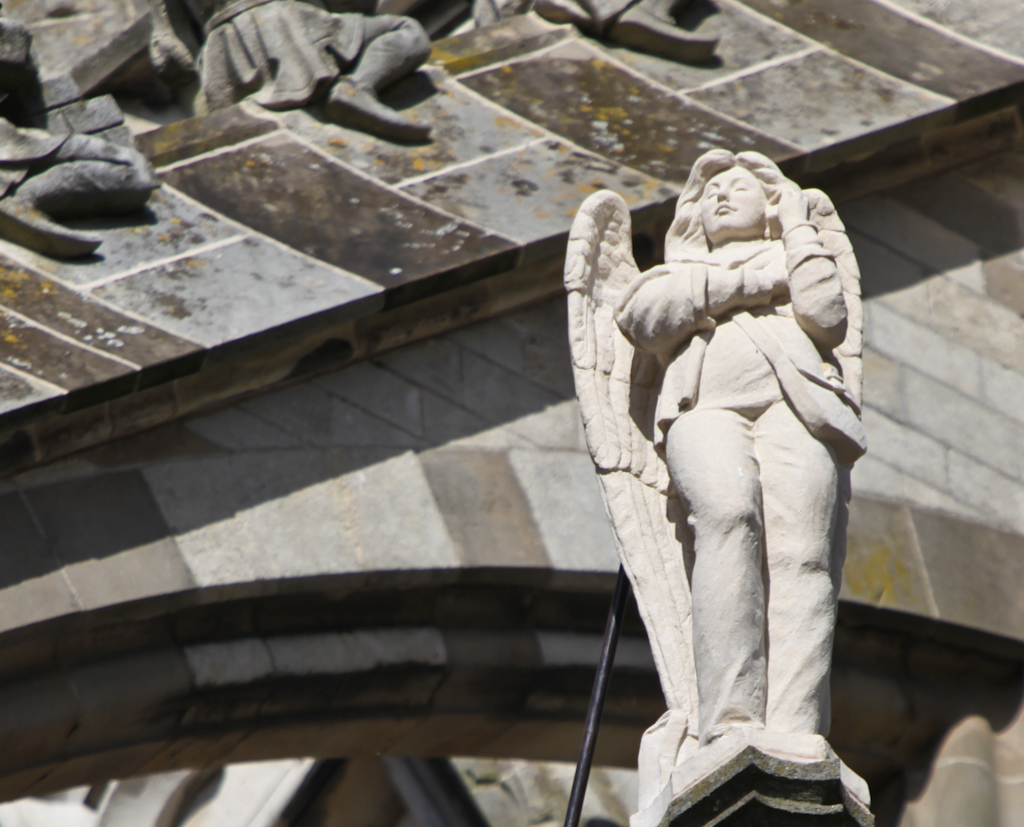
Angel with Mobile Phone

During the restoration 25 new angel statues were created by sculptor Ton Mooy, including one with a modern twist. The last angel in the series holds a mobile phone and wears jeans. “The phone has just one button,” the sculptor said. “It dials directly to God.” The mobile-using angel had to be first approved by the cathedral's fathers, who rejected earlier designs which included jet engines on the angel's back.

=== The Organ ===
The pipe organ of the cathedral was built by Heyeman between 1617 and 1621

The large organ in St. John's Cathedral is one of the most important organs of the Netherlands. The case of this organ is one of the most monumental of the Renaissance in the Netherlands.

This organ has a long history that begins with the construction in the period 1618-1638 by Floris Hocque II, Hans Goltfuss and Germer van Hagerbeer. The rood loft and the organ case were built by Frans Simons, a carpenter who probably came from Leiden. The sculpture of the organ case was carved by Gregor Schysler from Tyrol, who, however, like Floris Hocque, was originally from Cologne.

The organ was renovated, expanded and improved in past centuries by several organ builders, according to the latest fashions. The last renovation took place in 1984 and was conducted by the Flentrop firm. The organ was restored to about the situation of 1787, as the German organ builder A.G.F. Heyneman left it. Use is made of many pipes of that era, but also of pipes from later periods. In late 2003 the organ was thoroughly cleaned.

I Rugpositief C–f^{3}
Praestant	8′
Bourdon	8′
Quintadena	8′
Fluyttravers	8′
Octaaf	4′
Fluyt dous	4′
Super Octaaf	2′
Flageolet	1′
Mixtuur V
Sexquialter II
Trompet	8′
Dulciaan	8′
Tremulant

II Hoofdwerk C–f^{3}
Praestant	16′
Bourdon	16′
Praestant	8′
Holpyp	8′
Octaaf	4′
Teriaan	3^{1}/_{5}′
Quint	3′
Super Octaaf	2′
Mixtuur VII
Trompet	16′
Trompet	8′

III Bovenwerk C–f^{3}
Quintadena	16′
Praestant	8′
Roerfluyt	8′
Viola di Gamba	8′
Octaaf	4′
Open fluyt	4′
Quintfluyt	3′
Open fluyt	2′
Super Octaaf	2′
Sexquialter II
Carillon III
Cornet V
Trompet	8′
Vox Humana	8′
Hautbois	8′
Tremulant

Pedaal C–f^{1}
Praestant	32′
Praestant	16′
Bourdon	16′
Octaaf	8′
Gedekt	8′
Octaaf	4′
Bazuyn	16′
Trompet	8′
Clairon	4′
Cornet	2′

== Photo gallery ==
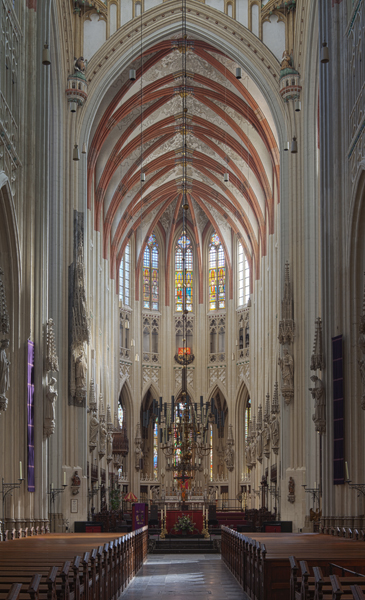
Choir

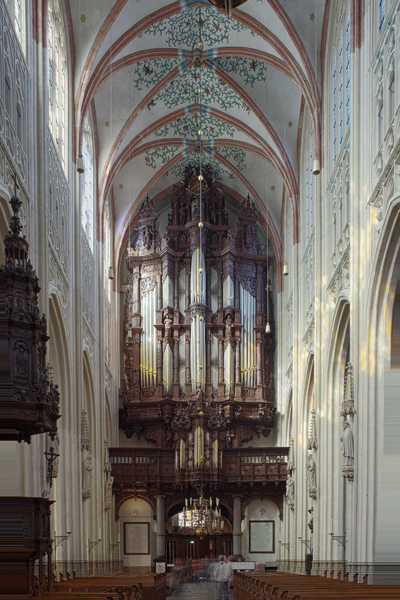
Organ Pipe

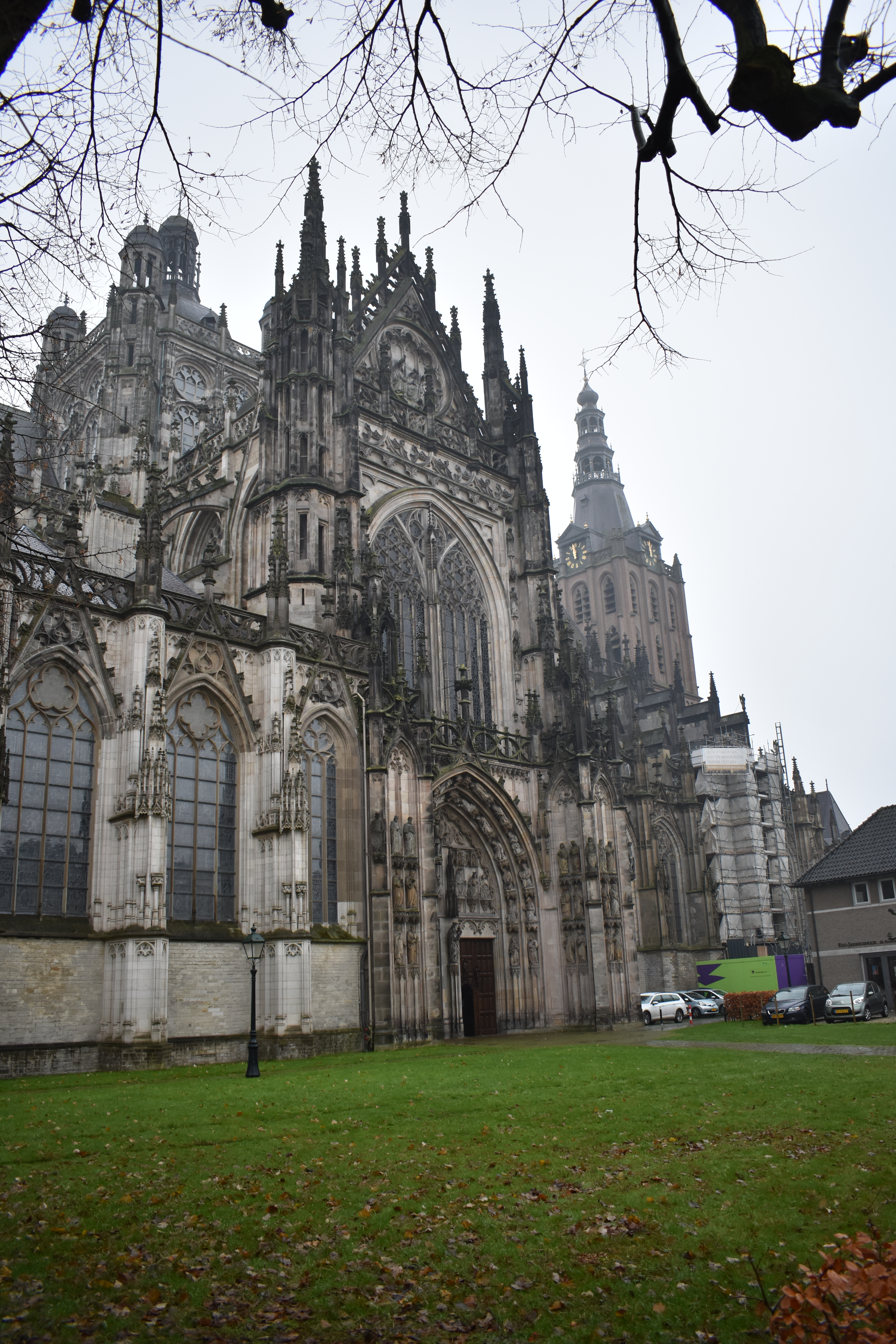
North side

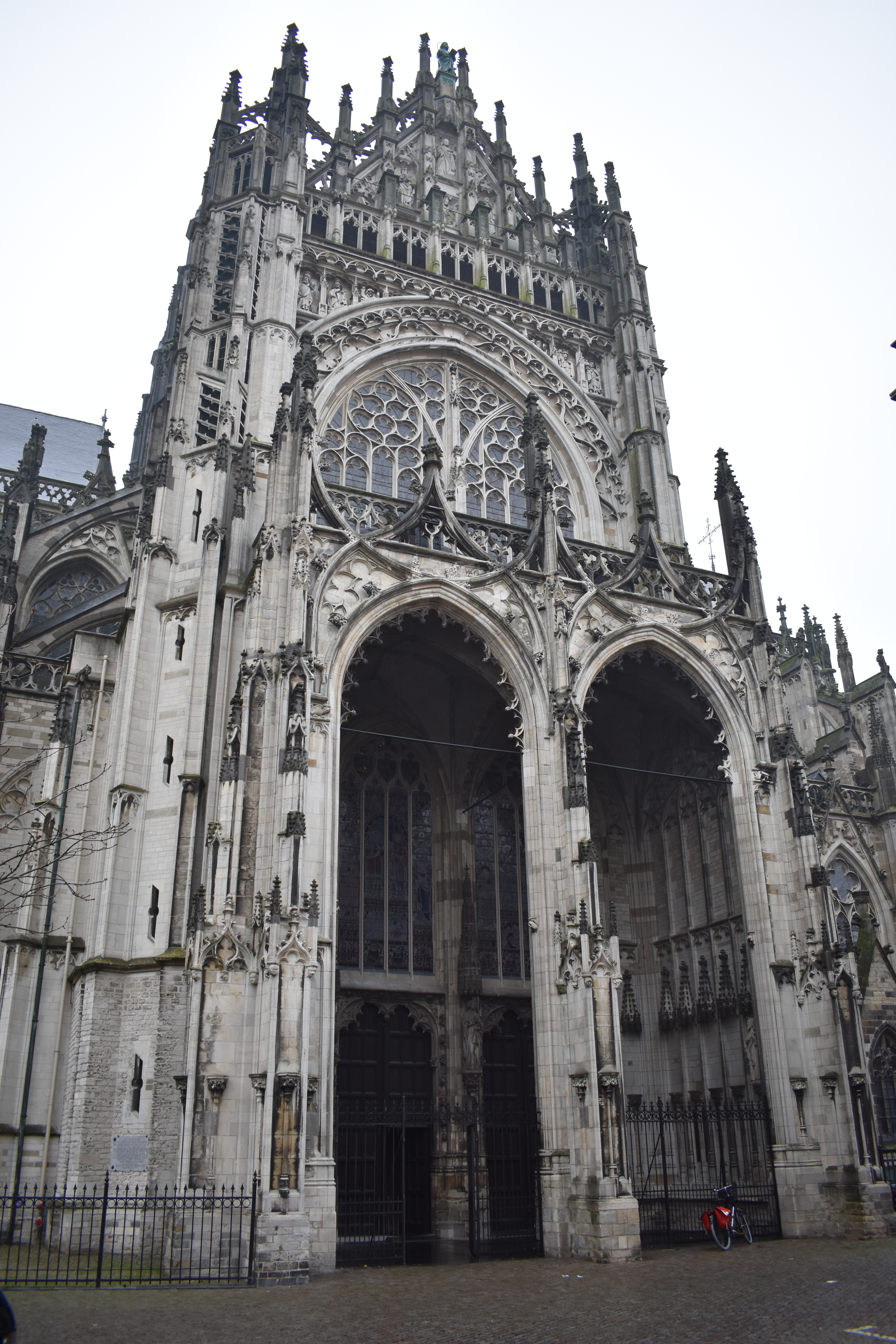
Southside

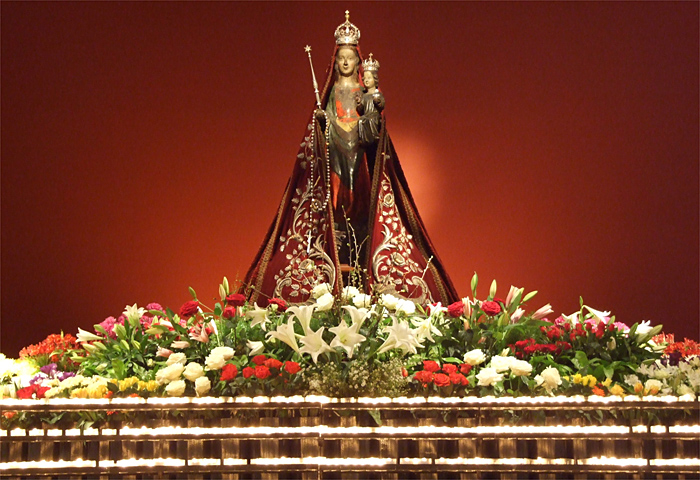
Zoete Lieve Vrouw van Den Bosch

== See also ==
- Brabantine Gothic
