= Zoeken naar Eileen =

Zoeken naar Eileen may refer to:

- Zoeken naar Eileen W., a novel by Leon de Winter
- Zoeken naar Eileen (film), a 1987 Dutch film, based on the novel
