= Arctic (journal) =

Scientific journal

- Discipline: Multidisciplinary
- Language: English
- Edited by: Patricia Wells

Publication details
- History: 1948–present
- Publisher: Arctic Institute of North America (Canada)
- Frequency: Quarterly
- Impact factor: 1.174 (2014)

Standard abbreviations
- ISO 4: Arctic

Indexing
- ISSN: 0004-0843 (print); 1923-1245 (web)
- OCLC no.: 1513979

Links
- Journal homepage; Current Issue; Online Archive

Arctic is a quarterly, peer-reviewed, multidisciplinary, scientific journal, published by the Arctic Institute of North America. The focus of Arctic is original research articles on all topics about or related to the northern polar and sub-polar regions of the world. Additional published formats are book reviews, profiles of notable persons, specific geographic locations, notable northern events, commentaries, letters to the editor, and a general interest section consisting of essays and institute news. Mutltidisciplinary coverage encompasses physical sciences, social sciences, biological sciences, humanities, engineering, and technology. The journal was first published in spring of 1948.

Since at least March 2018, a fake journal pretending to be the real Arctic has set up a website. The real journal is hosted through the University of Calgary.

== Abstracting and indexing ==
Arctic is indexed in the following databases:

- Science Citation Index
- Current Contents/Agriculture, Biology & Environmental Sciences
- The Zoological Record
- BIOSIS Previews

== See also ==
- Arctic Institute of North America
- ADA: Arctic Discovery & Access digital educational service and database
- Environmental Monitoring and Assessment
- Canadian Journal for Netherlandic Studies
- Area
- GeoJournal
- Journal of the Royal Geographical Society of London
