= Noordbrabants Museum =

Het Noordbrabants Museum
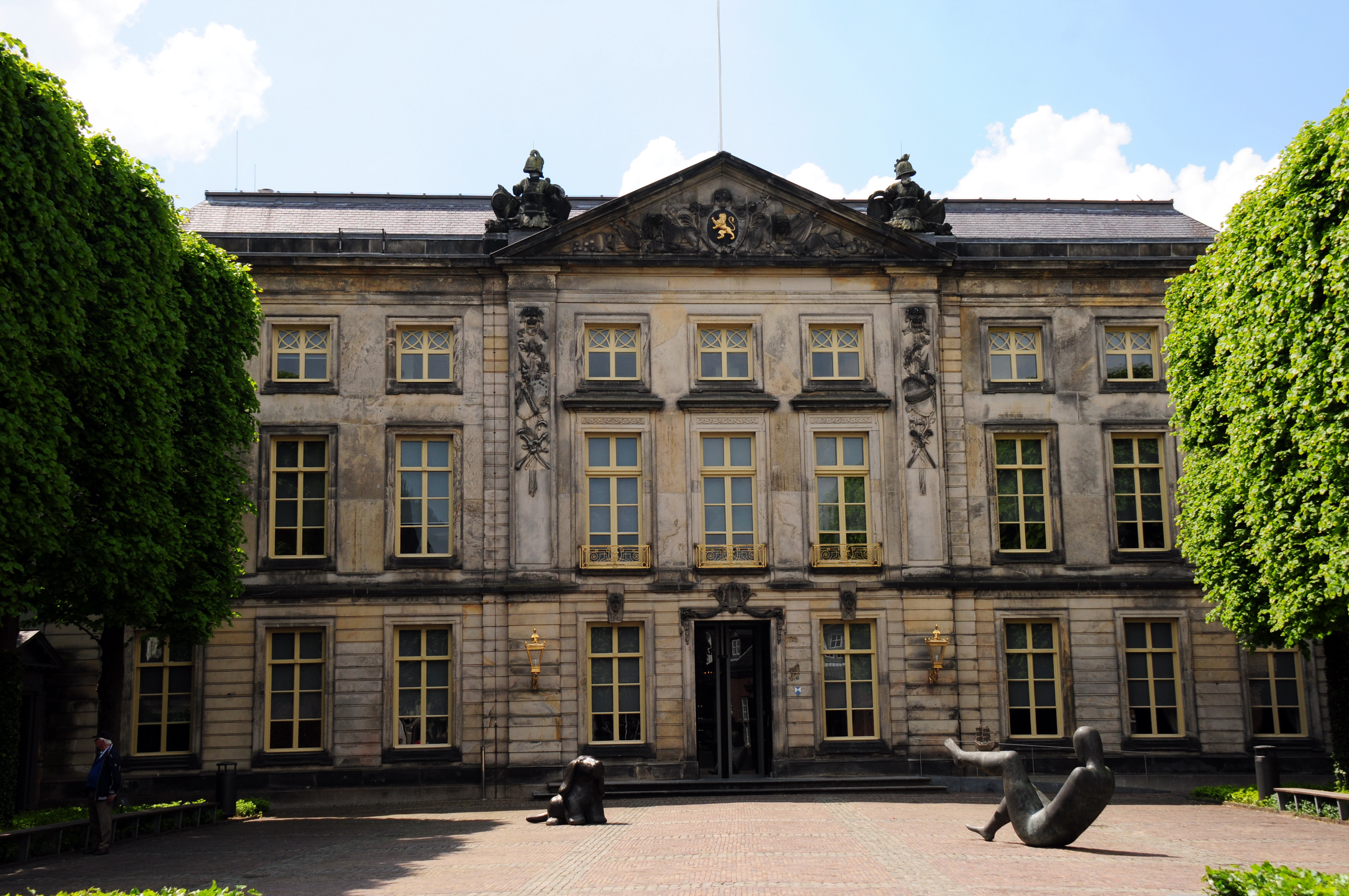
- Museum entrance in 2015

- Location within North Brabant
- Location: Verwersstraat 41 's-Hertogenbosch, Netherlands
- Coordinates: 51.6864°N 5.3047°E
- Type: Art museum
- Visitors: 510,000 (2016)
- Curator: Charles de Mooij
- Website: hetnoordbrabantsmuseum.nl

Het Noordbrabants Museum is an art museum in 's-Hertogenbosch, Netherlands.

== History ==
=== The Provincial Society for Arts and Sciences ===
Het Provinciaal Genootschap van Kunsten en Wetenschappen in Noord-Brabant (Provincial society for arts and sciences) was founded in 1836. Some of the founding members were the governor of North Brabant Baron Andreas van den Bogaerde van Terbrugge, whose portrait is in the hall of the museum, and C.R. Hermans, president of the Latin school of 's-Hertogenbosch. The society soon had over 250 members. The purpose of the society was the promotion of arts and sciences. It organized events, contests for research, published books, and created facilities for research, i.e. a library. The province supported the society with 1,000 guilders, and the municipality of 's-Hertogenbosch provided some rooms for the library.

=== Library of the society ===
The first location of the library of the Provincial society for Arts and Sciences was on the first floor of the Latin School on the Papenhorst. The society would become famous for this library, which included many manuscripts, but also some collections of coins and curiosities. In 1855 the society moved to the upper floors of the new building of the school, which had been rebranded as city Gymnasium (school). This provided suitable accommodation, not only for the library, but also for other work of the society. In 1868 the society was forced to move to new, but less suitable accommodations on the upper floor of the Butter hall on the market. It kind of limited the activities of the society on its own premises to the library function.

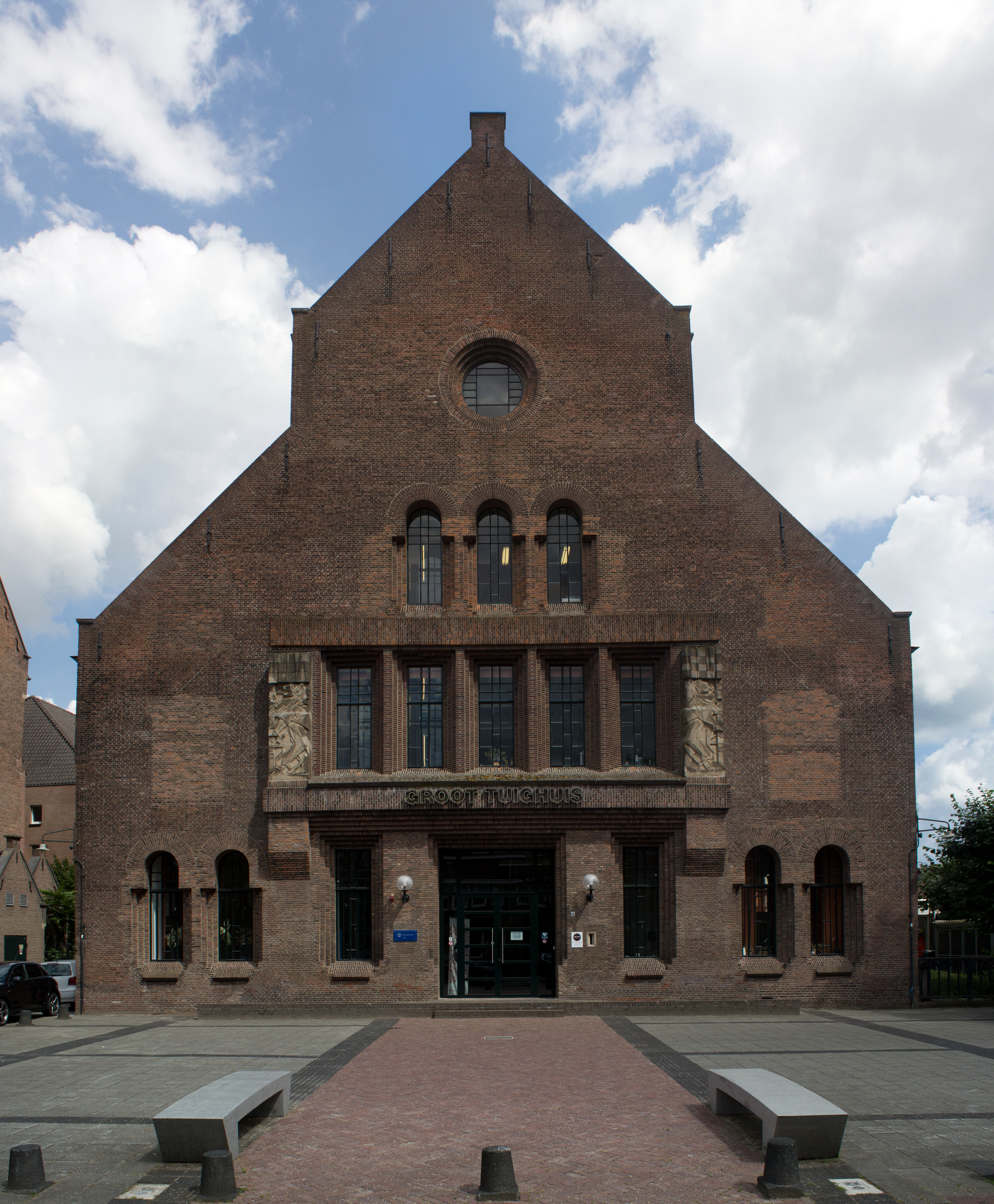
Big Arsenal (Groot Tuighuis)

=== Establishment of the museum ===
In 1919 a bequest of 110,000 guilders, made by C.P.D. Pape gave the society the means to realize its ambition to create a real museum. It started to look for a building, and found the Big Arsenal (Groot Tuighuis), which had been left by the Dutch military after World War I.

The Big Arsenal was the former St James church that had been turned into a stable, an arsenal, and finally a barracks. For the arsenal function, multiple solid floors had been created inside, making it a perfect place for a museum with a large library. The authorities agreed to hand it over for a small lease of 200 guilders, provided that Oscar Leeuw, architect of Museum Kam in Nijmegen would change it to a suitable building. The contract was signed in 1924, and in 1925 the 'Centraal Noord Brabantsch Museum' was opened.

Shortly after the opening of the museum, a description was given of the modest beginnings of the museum: A central hall had been made in the nave of the Big Arsenal. It was devoted to art work, mainly sculptures, that had been moved in from St. John's Cathedral, other sculptures had been moved to the Rijksmuseum. Behind the hall the choir housed the stately meeting room of the society, with the painting 'Samson and Delilah' by Abraham van Diepenbeeck. Near the choir were stairs to the upper galleries. The galleries gave an overview of the provincial and city history, but the exhibits were of no special value. The same applied to the municipal painting collection, which also found a home in the new museum. The society was aware that the collection of artifacts was not impressive, but now it had space to expand the collections and to exhibit them.

=== Before World War II ===
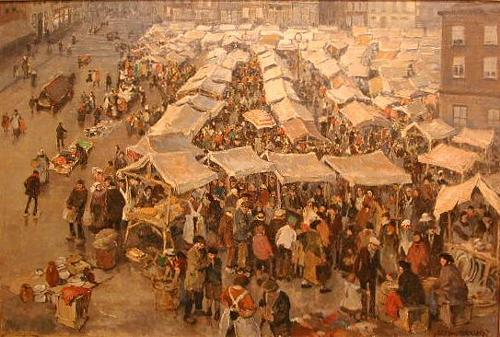
Markt in 's-Hertogenbosch by Herman Moerkerk

The Centraal Noord Brabantsch Museum regularly hosted exhibitions. For those that were related to literature, archaeology, (local) history, or works by established painters, the society could count on its own volunteers. In 1927 e.g. the fifth national congress of librarians was held in the museum. That same year the exhibition 'Noord-Brabant' showed books, etchings and paintings related to, or made by people from Brabant. There were paintings by Vincent van Gogh, Pieter de Josselin de Jong, Bernard van Vlijmen, Albert Verschuuren, Jan and Theo van Delft, Antoon Derkinderen, Jan Sluyters, Emanuel van der Ven, Jan Bogaerts, Herman Moerkerk, multiple members of the Slager family.

In matters of contemporary art the society was less skilled, but for a time it could keep up with what was expected in a town like 's-Hertogenbosch. Meanwhile, a group called 'Friends of the Society' (Vrienden van het Genootschap) started to buy modern art for the museum. The first work was a painting by Jan Sluyters bought in 1928. In 1929 a still life by Jan Bogaerts was bought, and another painting was gifted by Bogaerts. Meanwhile, people from Waalwijk gifted a work by Theo van Delft. In 1930 'Het reconvalescentje' by Frans Oerder was bought by the friends, and the artist gifted another work. In 1931 work by Henriëtte Pessers was gifted by a committee from Geldrop and Eindhoven, and the friends gifted a portrait of Jozef Israëls by De Josselin de Jong. During the Great Depression the growth of the collection slowed down.

=== After World War II ===
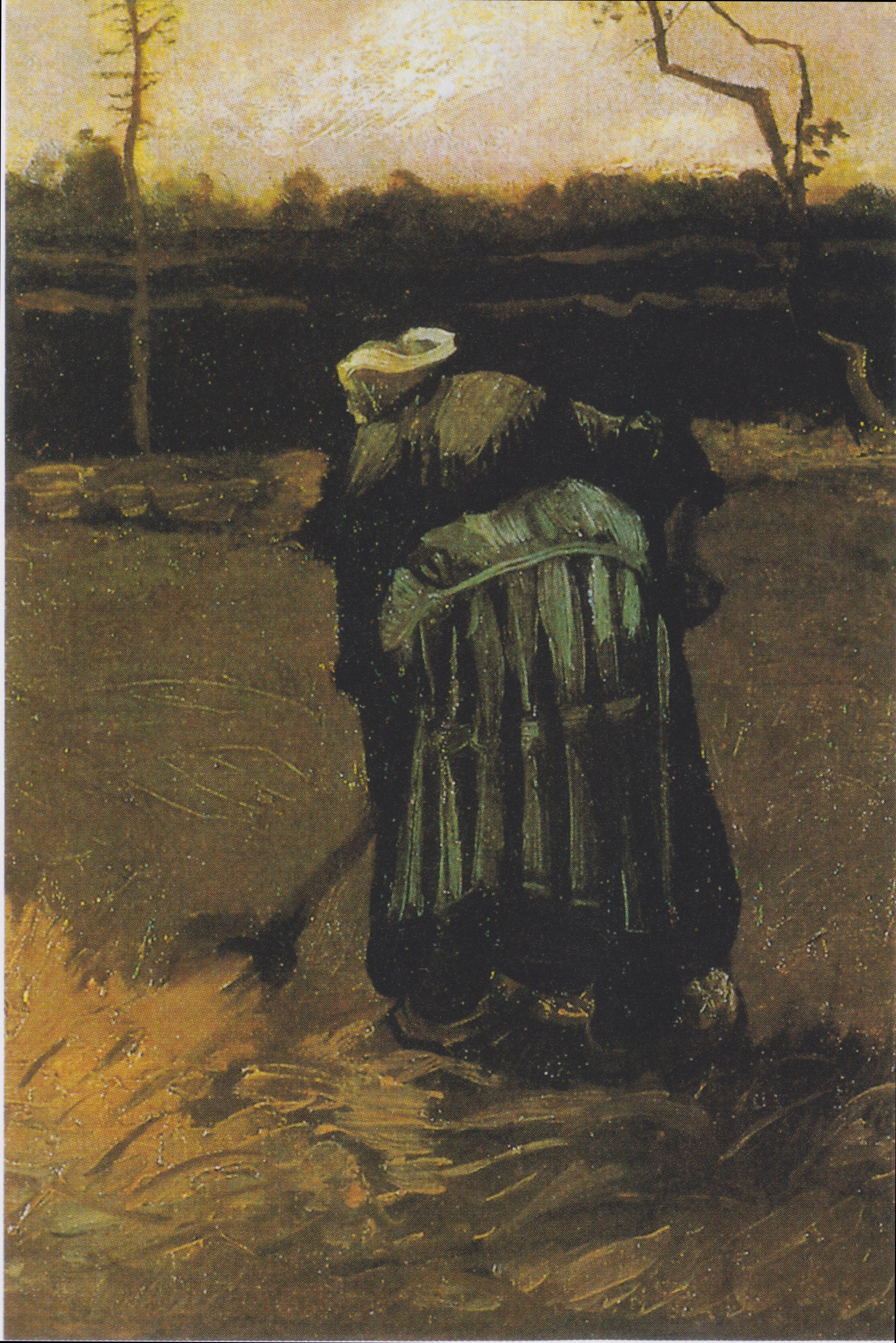
Digging peasant woman by Van Gogh, acquired 1980s

After World War II the usual business of the museum resumed. In 1947 it hosted the academy days of the Royal Netherlands Academy of Arts and Sciences. In 1949 it hosted an exposition about the poet Guido Gezelle, connected to the congress 'Art and Christianity'. The visual arts got an exposition of the work of Herman Moerkerk in December 1949. Meanwhile, change was in the air. In 1949 North-Brabant and Limburg counted for 20% of the Dutch population, but got only 3% of the national subsidies for culture. It was clearly an untenable situation. It was also clear that the position of the 'elitist' Society for Arts and Sciences, which had paid many bills, would suffer if other means became available. The Van Abbemuseum in Eindhoven was considered to be the only up to date museum in Noord Brabant.

In September 1967 a large exposition of Hieronymus Bosch (c. 1450 – 1516) was held in the museum on account of the 450th anniversary of his passing. It was remarkable that it took place on the initiative of some local private persons. It was furthermore unique for Noord-Brabant to have such a major exposition. It kindled a desire to have a city museum dedicated to art exhibitions, just like the Van Abbemuseum. The society with its many cultural historical exhibitions and other activities was seen as 'occupying' that museum. In 1968 the States of North Brabant therefore decided to separate the museum and the society. This did not happen, but a separate cultural council (Culturele Raad) was formed. In 1976 the provincial government then decided to force the society of the museum. In 1980 the museum finally became a foundation separate from the society. Later in the 1980s the gouvernement building was designated as the new building for the Noordbrabants Museum.

== The current museum ==
The current museum is dominated by a stately building with an eighteenth-century sandstone facade. It is known as the gouvernement, formerly the residence of the king's commissioner, called Gouverneur in Dutch. The first design to make it suitable as a museum was by Wim Quist, known for work on other museums. Economic headwind made that an entire wing had to be omitted from the plan. Nevertheless, the museum got twice as much space than it had previously, and the building also was much more suitable as a museum. In 2011 the museum was closed down for a second round of works. The museum got even more space and is now connected to the Design Museum and the provincial offices (Griffie). The ensemble is known as 'Museumkwartier'. On 24 May 2013 the museum reopened.

== Collection ==
=== Works from before 1925 ===
The Noordbrabants Museum has ambitions to play a part on the national level. The permanent collection however, focuses on artifacts and artists with ties to the province. As regards the most famous North Brabant artists (Bosch, Van Gogh and the Brueghels), the museum was established too late to have a good collection of their work.

- Some works from the school of Hieronymus Bosch, but not a single work by Bosch himself. The collection gives an impression of the work the city's most famous son.
- A handful of paintings and many etchings by Pieter Bruegel the Elder (1525–1530 – 1569), born in North Brabant, Pieter Brueghel the Younger, born in Brabant, and Jan (I) Brueghel.
- Multiple paintings by David Teniers the Younger (born in Antwerp, Brabant), almost all on permanent loan from others.
- Early works by Vincent van Gogh.

=== Early works by Van Gogh ===
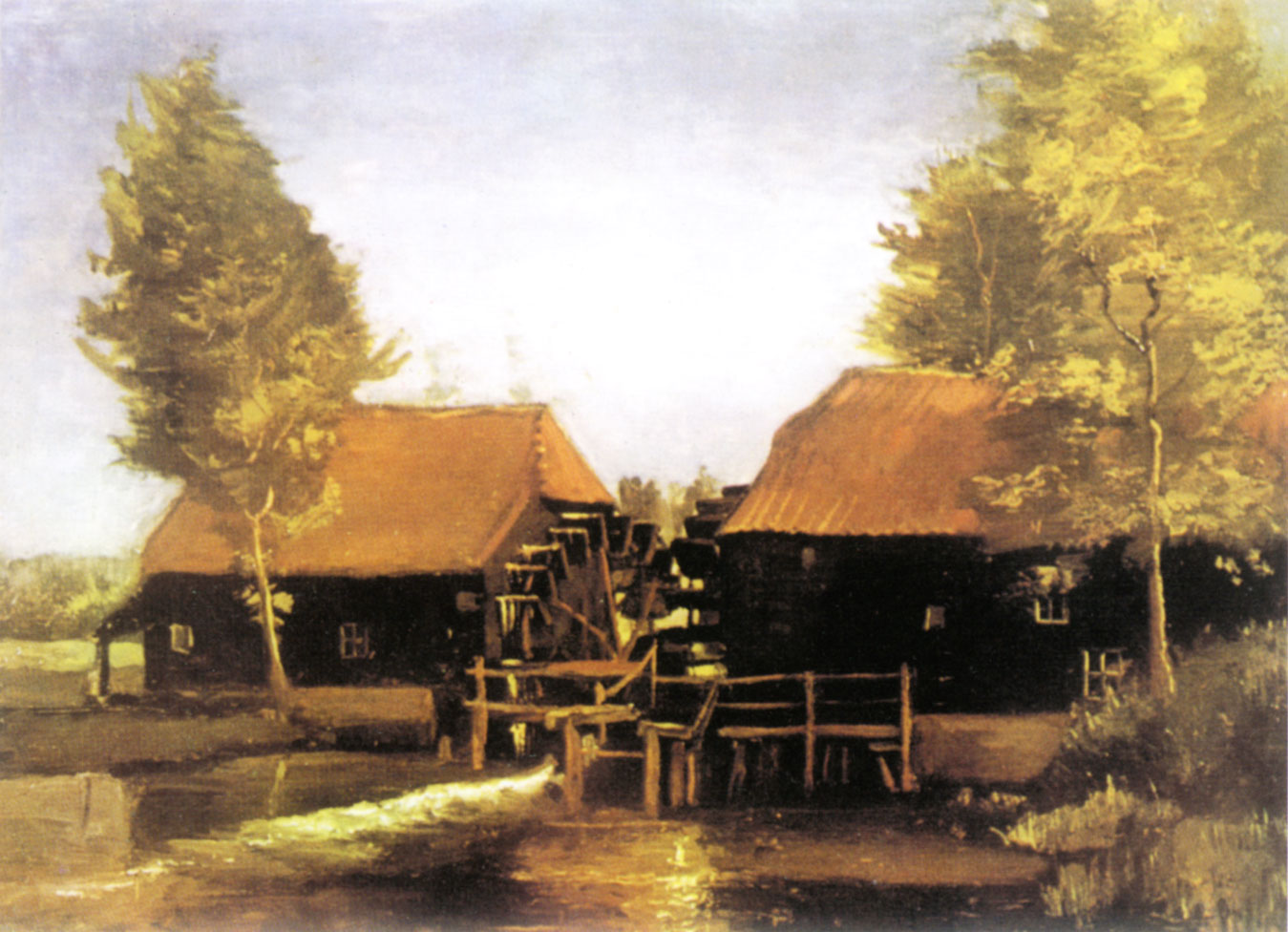
Watermill at Kollen by Van Gogh

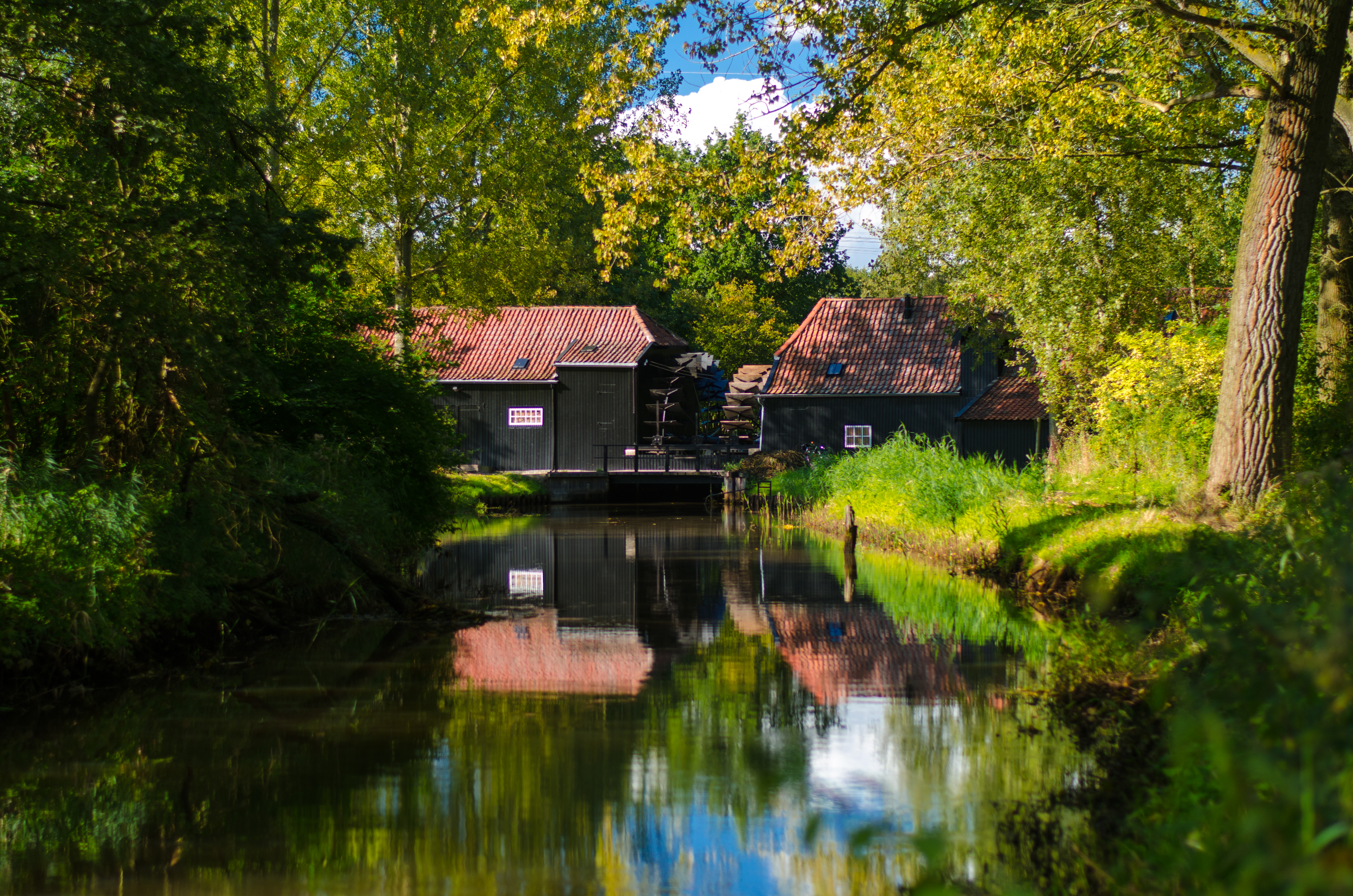
Watermill at Kollen today

Vincent van Gogh was born in Zundert, North Brabant. For a provincial museum this could be reason enough to collect his work. A somewhat more relevant reason to focus on Van Gogh, is that from December 1883 until November 1885 Van Gogh worked in North Brabant. In Nuenen he worked on his Peasant Character Studies. The museum owns some of these. In Nuenen he also made The Potato Eaters, which is owned by the Van Gogh Museum.

Apart from the Potato Eaters, these works are not the works that Van Gogh is most famous for. However, collecting the Nuenen works is in line with the focus and financial possibilities of the museum. A less obvious reason to want to have these works in North Brabant, is that many of the 'Nuenen' paintings depict objects that still exists in the North Brabant Landscape. The watermill at 't Coll is a fine example. It is open for visitors, and Van Gogh's painting of the mill is in the museum. Many other objects painted by Van Gogh can still be seen in Nuenen and surroundings. The Watermill at Gennep is another example.

In January 2020, the museum bought 'head of a woman' (Dutch: Kop van een Vrouw) for 1.6 million Euro. It is probably a pre-study for The Potato Eaters.

By 2020, the museum's Van Gogh collection gives a good overview of the works that Vincent made in North Brabant. It consists of 13 works by Van Gogh. Five owned by the museum and eight others on permanent loan from other institutions. In March 2021 the museum wants to open the permanent exposition 'Van Gogh in Brabant'.

=== Works created after 1925 ===
The museum has a good collection of works from artists who lived in 1925 or later. Here the focus is also on artists with ties to the province.

=== Curator ===
The curator is Charles de Mooij.

== Exhibitions ==
Notable exhibitions held at the museum include, Hieronymus Bosch - Visions of Genius.
