= Jessica Durlacher =

Dutch literary critic, columnist and novelist

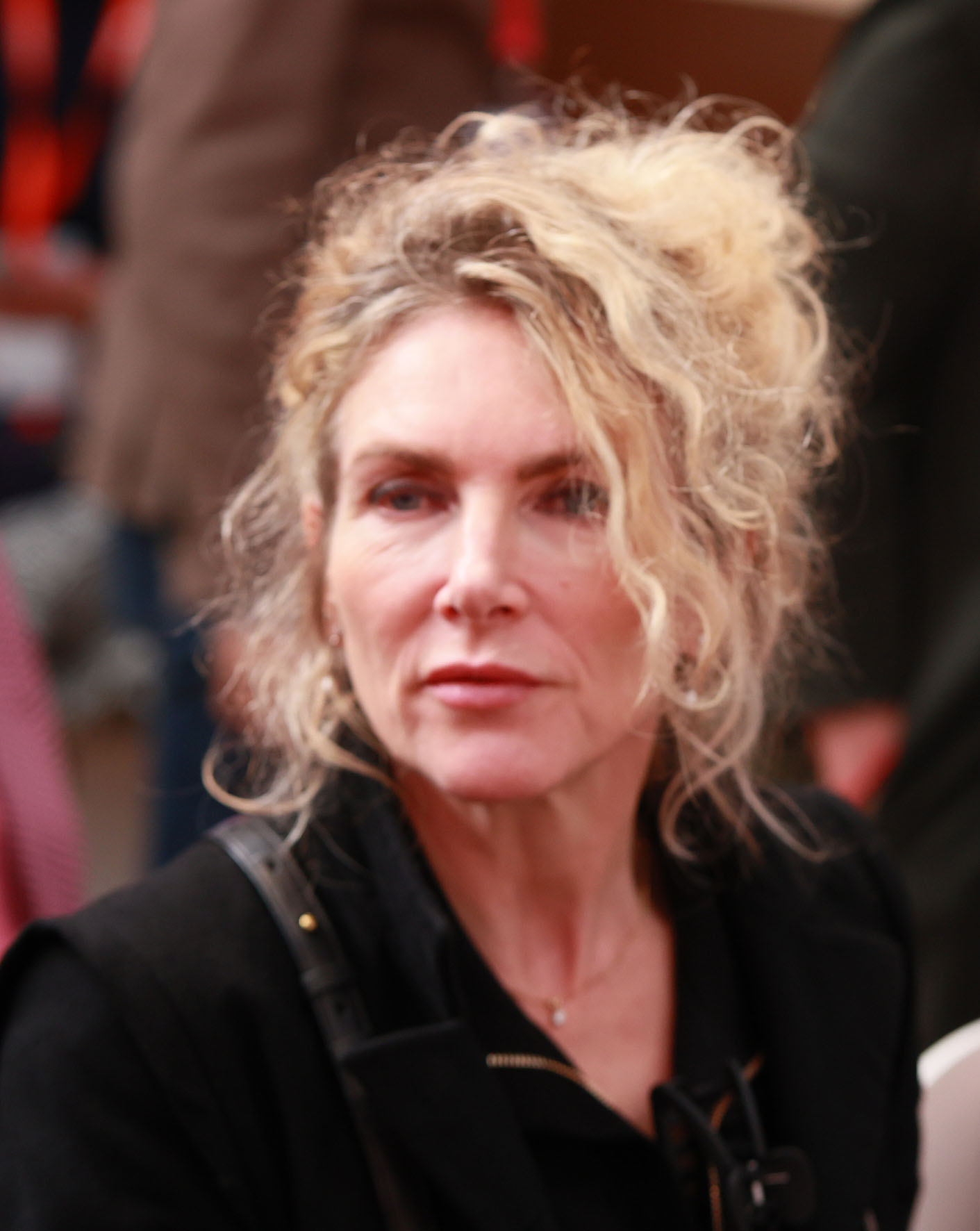
- Jessica Durlacher in 2022
- Born: Jessica Durlacher; September 6, 1961; Amsterdam, Netherlands
- Occupations: Literary critic; columnist; novelist
- Spouse: Leon de Winter
- Children: Moos; Moon (Solomonica)
- Website: www.jessicadurlacher.nl

Jessica Durlacher (Dutch pronunciation: [ˈjɛsikaː ˈdʏrlɑxər]; born 6 September 1961) is a Dutch literary critic, columnist and novelist.

Her father is the sociologist and writer Gerhard Durlacher, who survived the Auschwitz concentration camp. She is married to novelist Leon de Winter and they have two children, Moos and Moon (Solomonica).

Jessica Durlacher writes book reviews and columns for several magazines, such as Vrij Nederland.

She made her debut as a novelist in 1997 with Het Geweten (The Conscience), following with De Dochter (The Daughter) in 2000. Both novels are about children of Holocaust survivors. Her third novel, Emoticon, was published in 2004. The story is set against the background of the Israeli–Palestinian conflict. Her novels have been translated into German, Swedish, Russian and Italian.

In the fall of 2005 she was a co-professor, together with Johan Snapper and Leon de Winter, at Berkeley of the course titled Anne Frank and After, focusing on Dutch Holocaust literature and film, and recent religious and political developments in the Netherlands.

== Bibliography ==
- Het geweten (1998)
- De dochter (2000)
- Op scherp (2001)
- Nieuwbouw (2004)
- Emoticon (2004)
- Schrijvers! (2005)
