= Andreas van den Bogaerde van Terbrugge =

Dutch politician and art collector (1787–1855)

A.J.L. baron van den Bogaerde van Terbrugge
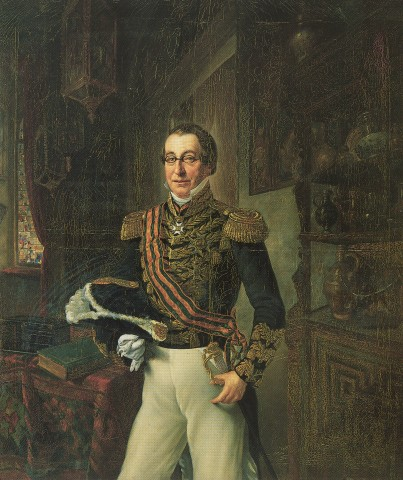
- Portrait of Andreas baron van den Bogaerde van Terbrugge (by E.A.H. van der Ven)

Governor of North Brabant
- In office 1830–1842

Grand Officer of the Royal House for King William II
- In office 1842–1855

Personal details
- Born: 7 July 1787 Ghent, County of Flanders, Austrian Netherlands
- Died: 12 January 1855 (aged 67)

Andreas Johannes Ludovicus baron van den Bogaerde van Terbrugge (7 July 1787 – 12 January 1855) was a Dutch nobleman, politician, author and art collector. He served as Governor of North Brabant between 1830 and 1842.

== Early life and family ==
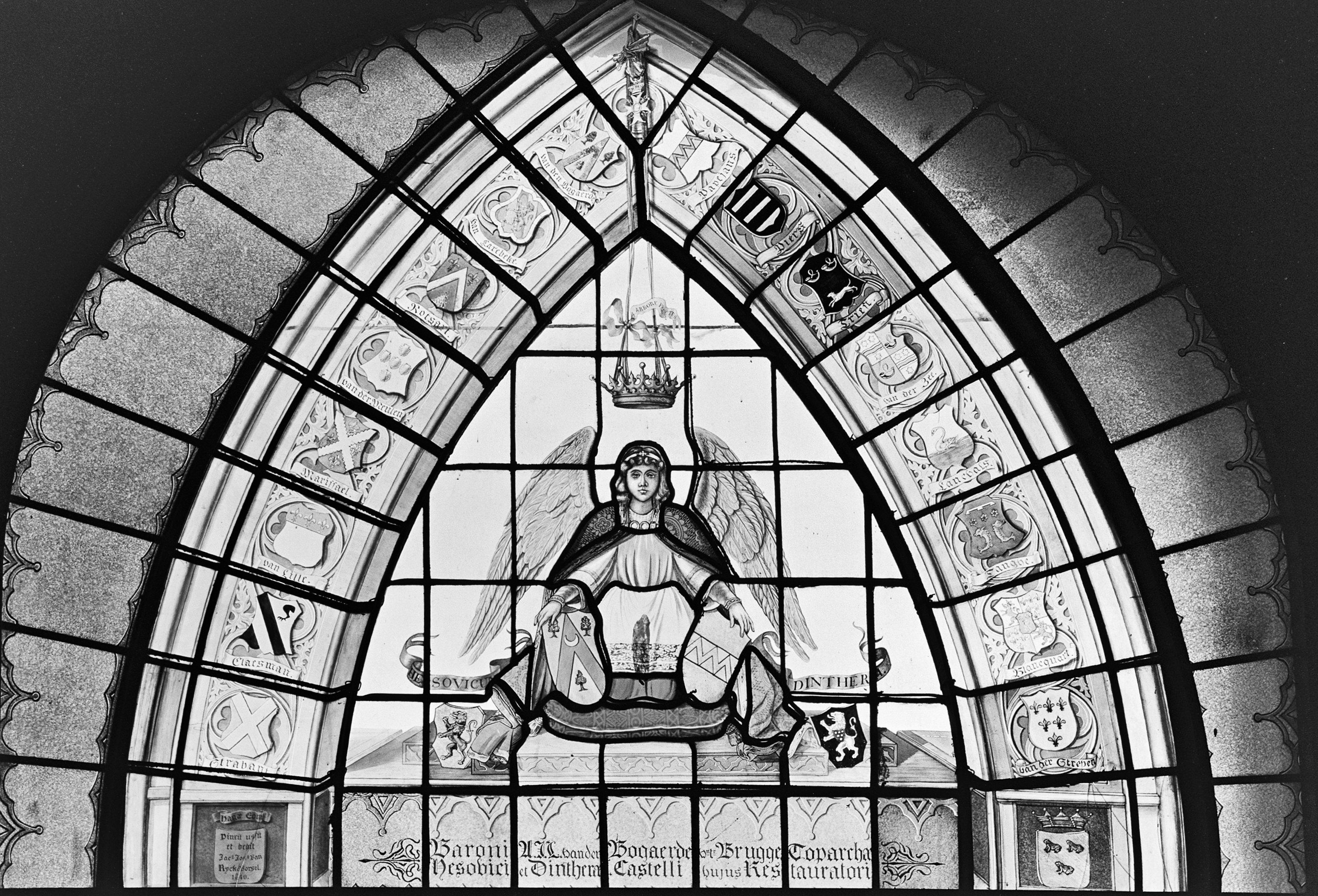
Overdoor in Heeswijk Castle by J.J. van Rijckevorsel.

Baron (1830) Andreas-Johannes van den Bogaerde descended from the old Bruges family Van den Bogaerde, which had been ennobled in the early 18th century. His grandfather Andries van den Bogaerde (1726–1799) had been a prominent politician in the Brugse Vrije. His second son André-François van den Bogaerde (1754–1834) became mayor of Waasmunster and married Marie-Jacqueline van Larebeke de ter Brugge (1765–1845). This allowed their descendants to add 'van Terbrugge' to their name. Van Terbrugge reminded of Marie-Jacqueline's father Gillis van Larebeke Lord of Ter Bruggen.

Andreas got lessons in Latin, Dutch and French from a monk of one of the suppressed convents of the Southern Netherlands. A Flemish painter taught him drawing and painting. On 21 February 1821, he married Jonkvrouwe Eugénie T.B.G. of the Papeians de Morchoven dit van der Strepen family. She died on 11 February 1843 at Castle Heeswijk.

The combined coats of arms of Andreas-Johannes and his wife are depicted on an overdoor at Heeswijk Castle. The descendants of Andreas and Eugénie would continue to live on Andreas' castle in Heeswijk until the 1990s.

== Political career ==
=== In Waasmunster ===
Right after the foundation of the United Kingdom of the Netherlands Andreas supported the House of Orange. His noble rank was immediately confirmed. In 1817 he became a member of the knighthood of East Flanders. His father became a baron only in March 1830, a title that Andreas inherited.

On 3 July 1818 Andreas became mayor of Waasmunster, succeeding his father. During his short tenure, he proved very effective. He created a road to Lokeren, and had many roads paved. He also had the first street lighting installed in the town. Above all he cared for the poor and put a stop to begging.

=== In East Flanders ===
In 1820 Andreas became a commissionary of the Arrondissement of Sint-Niklaas and settled in Sint-Niklaas. Here he became a member of the committee to promote military service in 1823. In 1826 he was ordered to organize a paved road from Sint-Niklaas to Hulst. In 1827 he became a member of the states-provincial of East Flanders. Andreas had much work to arrange the adoption of Dutch laws and regulations instead of the Imperial French ones. In this job his charm and diplomacy made him very successful.

During his stay in Sint Niklaas, Andreas executed many practical improvements. He was again responsible for the construction of many sett paved roads. Other improvements were the construction of a fish hall in stone in Waasmunster, and the organization of the archives of Roosenberg Abbey.

In 1828 Andreas became district and militia commissary in Ghent. Here he had more time for his passions. He built a new house and started a collection of paintings. He was later said to have become Mayor of Ghent, but this is not true.

=== In North Brabant ===
In February 1830 William I of the Netherlands appointed Jonkheer Andreas as governor of North-Brabant province. Andreas always remained loyal to the king and was one of the few southerners to retain his office in the north after the Belgian Revolution. In 1840 Andreas became a member of the knighthood of North Brabant, and its president. He became a member of the Council of State in 1838, and a Chamberlain of the king in 1840. He retired in 1842.

== Personal life ==
=== Early years ===
In his career Andreas was able to work on his passions: Science, History and Arts. Early on, he was educated in painting and drawing. In 1823 he became a member of the Society for Dutch Language and Literature in Sint Niklaas, and Member of the Society tot Nut van 't Algemeen, department Termonde. In 1824 he became President of the Provincial Commission for the preservation of Memorials of History and Art.

While many such appointments could come naturally to people in office, Andreas' inclinations became very clear in the late 1820s. When Andreas moved to Ghent in 1828, he started his own collection of paintings. In 1829 he became a correspondent member of the Nederlandsche Huishoudelijke Maatschappij in Haarlem. That same year he was said to have become Principal of the Academy for Visual Arts in Ghent.

=== Scientist / Publicist ===
Andreas was interested in many scientific subjects, see Works. In 1830 this was recognized when he became a member of the exclusive Maatschappij der Nederlandse Letterkunde (English "Society of Dutch Literature"). Works like Essai d'un retour franc et libéral à l'ancien ordre légal dans tout le royaume des Pays-Bas make his position on the unification of the Netherlands clear.

=== Provincial Society for Arts and Sciences in North-Brabant ===
In 1837 the Provincial Society for Arts and Sciences in North-Brabant (Provinciaal Genootschap van Kunsten en Wetenschappen in Noord-Brabant) was founded by Andreas and 6 others. Some of the founding members were: The Protestant A. Martini van Geffen, who seems to have been the right hand of Andreas in Brabant.; C.R. Hermans, principal of the City Gymnasium ('s-Hertogenbosch); Carel Willem Pape, Protestant Minister in Heusden and principal of its Latin School; J. Menu; Bookseller Hendrik Palier; and either J.D.W. Pape or the later Minister for the Catholic religion Jacobus Arnoldus Mutsaers.

One of the ambitions of the society was to strengthen the identity of Brabant in the kingdom. The idea was that if the society organized a library, it would be easier to write a history of the province. Andreas opened the first session of the society with a speech that gave an overview of comparable societies through the ages, and why possession of a library was important. He then continued with the ambition for, and use of, a history of the province, the importance of improving agriculture, and finally some words on industrialization. The society's museum would later become the Noordbrabants Museum and its library is now known as the Brabant Collection.

=== Heeswijk Castle ===
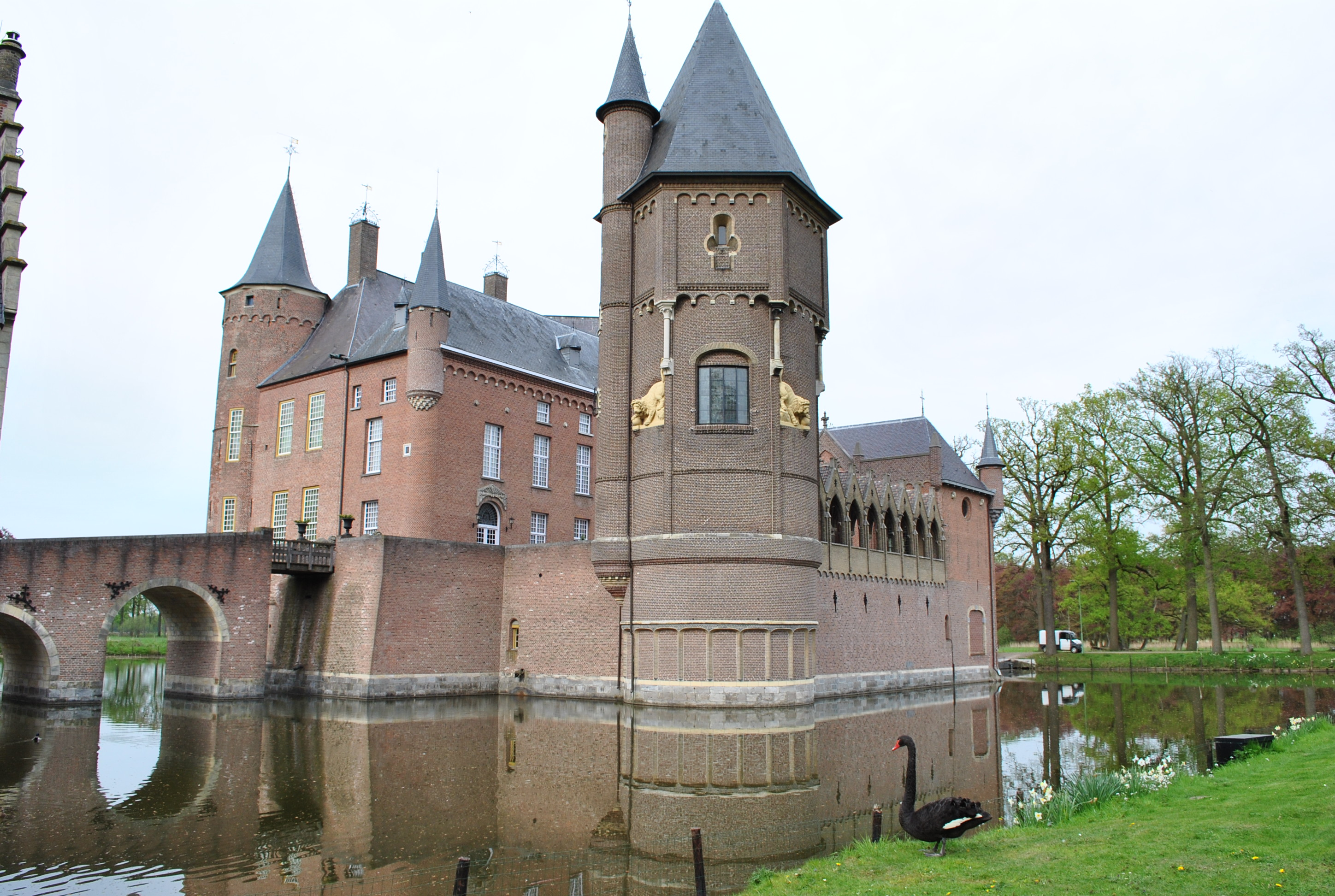
Heeswijk Castle

In 1834 Andreas bought medieval Heeswijk Castle. Andreas and his descendants renovated the castle and added some structures. The castle was meant to house their very big collection of arts and antiquities. His descendants continued to live at the castle. The last of them lived on the outer bailey until the early 1990s. The castle is now a museum owned by the foundation Stichting Slot Heeswijk and is one of the best known castles of North Brabant. The family tomb is at St. Willibrord's Church in Heeswijk.

=== Art Collection ===
The collection of antiquities at Heeswijk Castle would become extremely large. It was something in between a cabinet of curiosities and a serious collection art. E.g. it had dozens of paintings from the Dutch Golden Age, Medieval paintings and sculptures, and Maps of the province. On the other hand, it had a large collection of iron and stone objects, and a very large collection of weapons. When the collection was auctioned most of it was bought by foreign collectors.

== Works ==
- Het district van St. Nicolaas, voorheen Land van Waas , beschouwd met betrekking tot deszelfs Natuur-, Staat- en Geschiedkunde, gevolgd door eene bijzondere beschrijving van elke stad, dorp of gemeente in hetzelfde gelegen (3 volumes., Sint-Niklaas, 1825).
- Verzameling van Romeinsche en Gaulsche oudheden, ontgraven in het land van Waes, provincie Oost-Vlaanderen (Sint-Niklaas, 1825).
- Proef op de aanmoediging en uitbreiding der linnenweverijen, in Oost-Vlaanderen, gevolgd van de tienjarige optelling van al de op de markten van Oost-Vlaanderen verkochte lijnwaden (Gent, 1826).
- Vlugtig overzigt der geschiedenis van België en die van Polen, toegepast op de tegenwoordige gebeurtenissen tot 1 Jan. 1831 ('s-Hertogenbosch, 1831).
- Essai d'un retour franc et libéral à l'ancien ordre légal dans tout le royaume des Pays-Bas (The Hague, 1831)
- Proeve over de belangrijkheid van den handel, de scheepvaart en de nijverheid in de gewesten die van 1813-'30 uitmaakten het koningrijk der Nederlanden ('s-Gravenhage, 1845). Original French edition: Essai sur l'importance du commerce, de la navigation et de l'industrie (The Hague and Brussel 1844)
- Many of his opening speeches for the summer sessions of the States-provincial of North Brabant were also published.
