= Leon de Winter =

Dutch writer and columnist

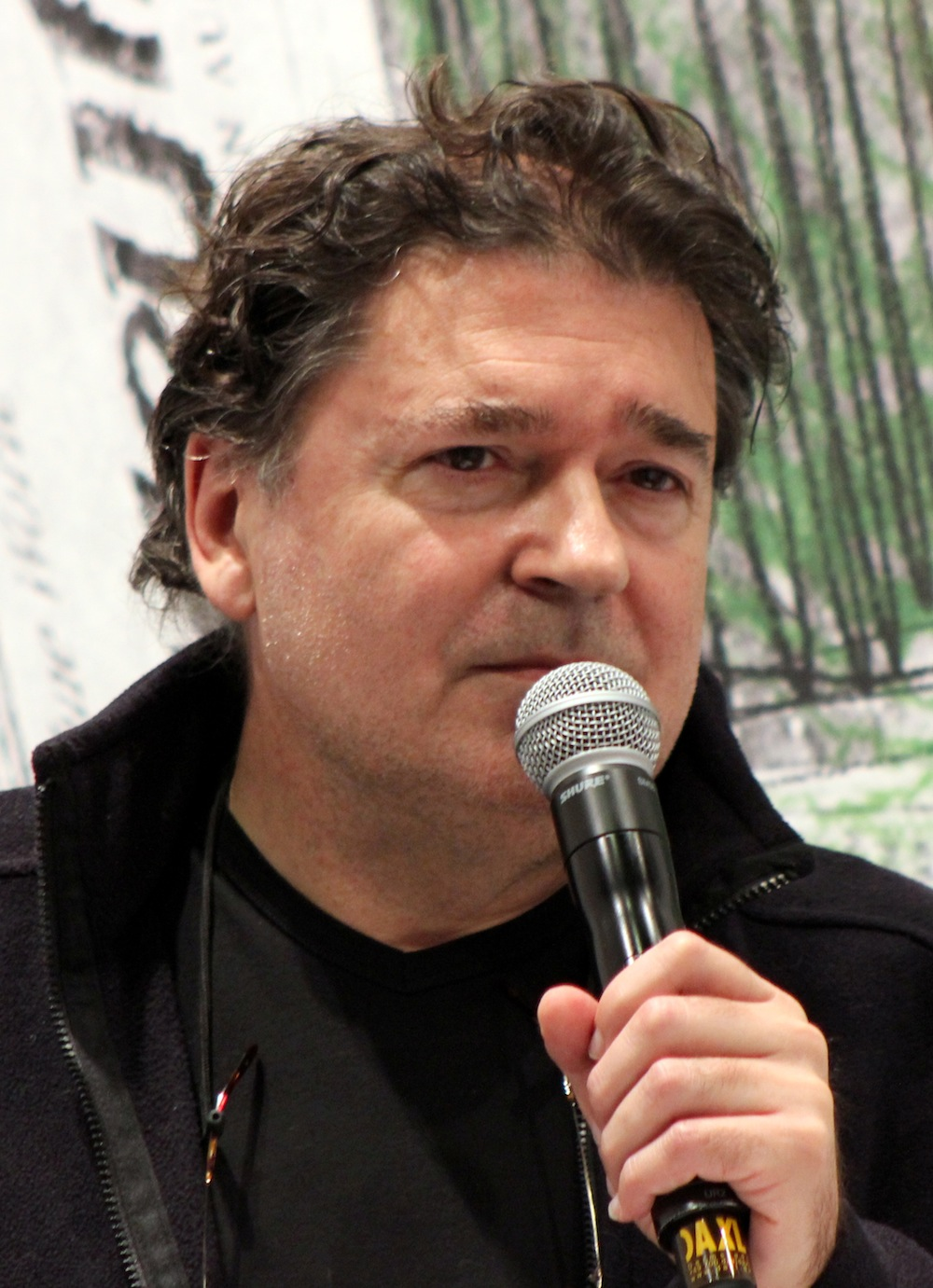
- de Winter in 2013
- Born: 26 February 1954 (age 72); Den Bosch, Netherlands
- Occupation: Author
- Writing career
- Genre: Novel
- Notable works: Zoeken naar Eileen W. (trns: Looking for Eileen W.)

Signature
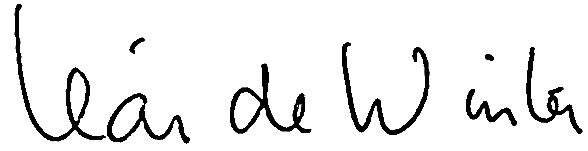

Leon de Winter (born 26 February 1954) is a Dutch novelist and columnist.

== Early life ==
Leon de Winter was born on 24 February 1954 in Den Bosch, in the southern Netherlands. He grew up in a Jewish Orthodox family and attended City Grammar School in Den Bosch. After his graduation he attended the film academy in Munich and the Netherlands Film Academy in Amsterdam. He criticized this school and left in 1978 without a degree.

== Writing career ==
After leaving the Film Academy, De Winter made some television series, like Junkieverdriet and De (ver)wording van de jonge Dürer. The latter, which was also rewritten into a novel, is the story of an unemployed young boy who does not know how to handle life, and who goes slowly but inevitably insane.

Until 1982 De Winter also wrote reviews for the weekly magazine Vrij Nederland.

His first successful novel was Zoeken naar Eileen W. (1981). A film version of this was made by Rudolf van den Berg. In 1981 De Winter also wrote Place de la Bastille.

In 1986 the novel Kaplan was published. The protagonist of this novel is a writer who is searching for the truth about birth, love and death.

In 1990 the novel Hoffman's honger was published. Hoffman's honger is a literary thriller set in Prague.

Hoffman's honger was followed in 1991 by the novel Supertex. In 1992 the novel De ruimte van Sokolov was published. Just like Hoffman's honger, De ruimte van Sokolov is a literary thriller, this time set in Israel.

In 1995 De Winter wrote Zionoco, the story of a rabbi, who has lost his faith, and is searching for his Jewish roots. In the same year, his book Serenade was published as the "Boekenweekgeschenk".

De Winter's latest novels are De hemel van Hollywood, which was published in 1997, God's Gym, which was published in 2002, and Het recht op terugkeer, published in 2008.

Most of these works feature protagonists searching—in particular, for a Jewish identity. These attempts to bring order out of chaos are a result of discontent with seemingly empty and aimless lives.

De Winter became more involved in political writings in newspapers and magazines, and appearances on television, possibly the most recognizable of these being his many articles in support of Israel and his support for an "Islamic Enlightenment".

On 26 December 2007, de Winter announced a stop to his political writings on blogs and magazines and that he was considering a one-year sabbatical with his family to California. One year turned into three years and he moved back to the Netherlands and he started writing for Dutch and German newspapers again.

De Winter continued publishing opinion articles in newspapers in the Netherlands, such as on the racism trial against Geert Wilders, criticisms of Barack Obama, the European Union, the Euro currency and financial aid for members of the Euro area. Since early 2020 de Winter supports Black Lives Matter.

In 2025, De Winter criticised the Concertgebouw in Amsterdam for cancelling a concert in which the 'cantor' of the Israeli Defence Force was singing. De Winter commented that "Joseph Goebbels would happily give the Concertgebouw management a pat on the back."

== Personal life ==
De Winter is married to Jessica Durlacher, who is also a writer. They have two children, Moos and Moon (Solomonica), and are currently living in Bloemendaal and Los Angeles.

His cousin is Harry de Winter.

== Film directing ==
He directed three films, De Verwording van Herman Dürer, De grens, between 1979 and 1993. The film De grens was screened in the Un Certain Regard section at the 1984 Cannes Film Festival.

== Film adaptations ==
- Zoeken naar Eileen, directed by Rudolf van den Berg (1987, based on the novel Zoeken naar Eileen W.)
- The Hollywood Sign, directed by Sönke Wortmann (2001, based on the novel De hemel van Hollywood)
- SuperTex, directed by Jan Schütte (2003, based on the novel SuperTex)

== Awards and honors ==
- 2002 Welt-Literaturpreis
