= Henriëtte Pessers =

Dutch artist

- self portrait, 1939
- Born: Henriëtte Anna Maria Pessers; 3 January 1899; Tilburg, Netherlands
- Died: 22 May 1986 (aged 87); Heeze, Netherlands
- Other names: Henriëtte Jansen-Pessers
- Known for: Painting

Henriëtte Pessers (3 January 1899 - 22 May 1986) was a Dutch artist who painted in the Expressionist style.

== Biography ==
Pessers was born on 3 January 1899 in Tilburg. She attended the Académie Royale des Beaux-Arts in Brussels. Her teachers included Gustave De Smet, Jan van Delft, Antoon Derkinderen, Gerard Jacobs, Constant Permeke, Henri Van Haelen, and Albert Verschuuren. Her work was included in the 1939 exhibition and sale Onze Kunst van Heden (Our Art of Today) at the Rijksmuseum in Amsterdam. In 1941 she married P.M.C. Jansen.

Pessers died on 22 May 1986 in Heeze. Her work is in the Noordbrabants Museum and the Van Abbemuseum.
