= Solomonica de Winter =

Dutch writer

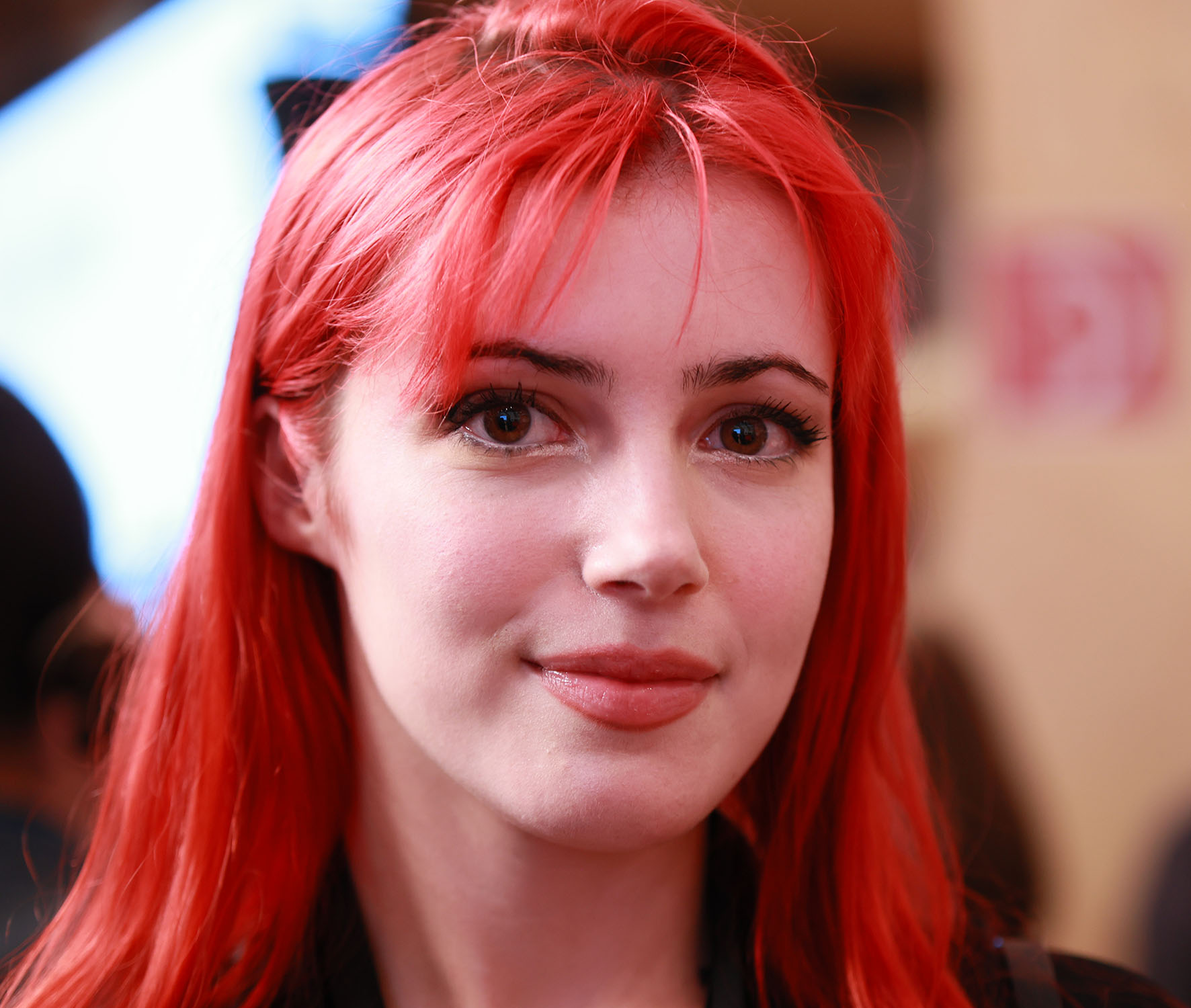
- De Winter in 2022
- Born: Moon de Winter; 3 June 1997 (age 28); Bloemendaal, Netherlands
- Occupations: Writer; online personality
- Years active: 2014–present
- Relatives: Jessica Durlacher (mother); Leon de Winter (father)
- Writing career
- Genre: Dystopian; science fiction; young adult

Moon "Solomonica" de Winter (born 3 June 1997) is a Dutch writer and online personality who writes exclusively in English. She is known for posting surreal comedy videos on social media.

== Early life ==
Moon de Winter was born in Bloemendaal on 3 June 1997, the daughter of writers Jessica Durlacher and Leon de Winter. Mother was a daughter of Holocaust survivor and father came from Jewish Orthodox family.

== Career ==
De Winter wrote her first book, Over the Rainbow (2014), at the age of 16. It was also published in Dutch, French, and German. Her second book was the dystopian sci-fi novel Natural Law (2022).

Throughout the 2020s, de Winter has become more widely known for her presence on Instagram and TikTok; having changed her hairstyle to vivid red pigtails styled after the Wendy's mascot, she began uploading surreal and slightly unsettling comedy videos in which she portrays herself as a self-described "sentient AI who likes to write and make art" and "tactical carbon-based sentient Wendy's AI bot reporting live from the simulation". Her videos are edited in an off-kilter manner and often feature her dressing as the Wendy's mascot, brandishing weapons such as a handgun or katana, wandering in the woods, speaking in an unnaturally soft tone of voice, joking about disparate topics ranging from tax evasion to the military-industrial complex, and ending by staring vacantly at the floor as her eye begins to twitch. As of December 2025, she has over 495,000 followers on Instagram.

== Bibliography ==
- Over the Rainbow (2014)
- Natural Law (2022)
