= Johan Snapper =

Johan Pieter Snapper (born 1935 in the Netherlands), is emeritus Queen Beatrix Professor of Dutch Language, Literature and Culture at the University of California, Berkeley He is known as a literary critic and champion of Dutch culture in the United States. His current research is on the role of the Protestant churches in the Netherlands during WW II.

== Life ==
Johan Snapper's parents, Hendrikus and Martha Snapper, were active in the Dutch resistance in Naaldwijk, South Holland. They hid Jews to prevent them from deportation, and his father, head of the town's labor exchange, destroyed documents to delay their being sent to Germany. His parents were posthumously (2007) honored as Righteous among the Nations, the highest recognition bestowed on non-Jews by the Knesset in Israel.

Snapper immigrated with his family to the United States in 1949. He received a degree in philosophy Calvin College in Grand Rapids, Michigan, followed by an M.A in Eighteenth-century German literature from the University of Chicago, and a Ph.D. in 1967 from the University of California at Los Angeles with a doctoral dissertation on the 18th-century playwright Friedrich Maximilian Klinger, "Titanism in the Work of Friedrich Maximilian Klinger" and the University of California, Los Angeles (Ph.D.).

Snapper has three children: Pieter Snapper, a composer, tonmeister and professor in Istanbul, Juliana Snapper, a Los Angeles-based opera singer, and Stefan Snapper, an attorney and marketing director in Long Beach, California.

== Academic work ==
Snapper's scholarly work centers on Post-war Netherlandic literature, particularly those writers dealing with antisemitism and the Holocaust in the Netherlands and Belgium. His publications consist of monographs on the work of writers Gerard Reve (De spiegel der verlossing in het werk van Gerard Reve, 1990) and Marga Minco (De wegen van Marga Minco, 1999) and several dozen scholarly articles.

Snapper is the founder of the Netherlands-America University League in California (NAUL-CAL). He organized eight international conferences on Dutch linguistics and literature, and has been on the editorial boards of Publications of the American Association for Netherlandic Studies, ' Canadian Journal of Netherlandic Studies and De Nederlandse Taal. He has been president of the American Association for Netherlandic Studies, a member of the executive board of the International Association for Netherlandics), and chair of the Netherlands International Commission on Higher Education for Czechoslovakia, Hungary, and Rumania.

== Honors ==
Snapper was honored for his scholarly work with a Festschrift, Vantage Points (1996). He received a Congressional Citation of Merit (USA), and is an Officer in the Order of Orange-Nassau (the Netherlands) and in the Order of the Crown (Belgium). In 2009 he was a Fellow at the Flemish Academy of Science and the Arts in Brussels (VLAC), together with his wife, Dr. Gerda Snapper, a Germanist interested in the Holocaust literature of Austria, respectively. For fifteen years he held the post of honorary consul of the Netherlands for northern California.

He currently resides in Moraga, California.

== Publications ==
He was the recipient of the Festschrift: Spahr, Blake Lee et al. eds, Vantage Points. Festschrift for Johan P. Snapper. Publications of the American Association for Netherlandic Studies 10. Lanham: University Press of America. 1996)

=== Books written ===
- Snapper, Johan P. De wegen van Marga Minco. Amsterdam: Bert Bakker. 1999.
- De spiegel der verlossing in het werk van Gerard Reve. Amsterdam: Veen. 1990.
- Post War Dutch Literature: A Harp Full of Nails. Amsterdam: Delta. 1971.
- Titanism in the Work of Friedrich Maximilian Klinger (dissertation). U.C. Berkeley. 1967.

=== Books edited ===
- Snapper, Johan P. and Thomas F. Shannon, ed. Janus at the Millennium: Perspectives on Time in the Culture of the Netherlands. Publications of the American Association for Netherlandic Studies 15. Lanham: University Press of America. 2004.
- Snapper, Johan P. and Thomas F. Shannon, ed. The Dutch Language at the Millennium. Publications of the American Association for Netherlandic Studies 12. . Lanham: University Press of America. 2002
- Snapper, Johan P. and Thomas F. Shannon, ed. Dutch Poetry in Modern Times. Publications of the American Association for Netherlandic Studies .11. Lanham: University Press of America. 1997.
- Snapper, Johan P. and Thomas F. Shannon, ed. Dutch Linguistics in a Changing Europe. Publications of the American Association for Netherlandic Studies 8. Lanham: University Press of America. 1995.
- Snapper, Johan P. and Thomas F. Shannon, ed.: Dutch Literature in an International Context. Publications of the American Association for Netherlandic Studies 6. Lanham: University Press of America. 1993.
- Snapper, Johan P. and Thomas F. Shannon, ed. Dutch Linguistics at Berkeley: Issues and Controversies Old and New. Publications of the American Association for Netherlandic Studies 4. Lanham: University Press of America. 1991.
- Snapper, Johan P. and Thomas F. Shannon, ed. The Berkeley Conference on Dutch Literature. New Perspectives on the Modern Period. Publications of the American Association for Netherlandic Studies 2. Lanham: University Press of America. 1989.
- Snapper, Johan P. and Jeanne van Oosten, ed. Dutch Linguistics at Berkeley. Berkeley: University of California. 1986.

=== Articles ===
He is also the author of several scholarly articles in Dutch and English, and chapters in many collections.
