= The Demise of Herman Durer =

1979 Dutch film

- Film poster
- Directed by: Leon de Winter
- Release date: 1979
- Country: Netherlands
- Language: Dutch

The Demise of Herman Durer (Dutch: De Verwording van Herman Dürer) is a 1979 Dutch film directed by Leon de Winter.

== Cast ==
- Ab Abspoel ... Vader
- Joop Admiraal ... Reclasseringsambtenaar
- Henny Alma ... Moeder
- immy Berghout ... Peter
- Jody Buchman ... Karl
- Rob Fruithof
- Marjan Geveling
- Felix Jan Kuipers ... Herman Dürer
- Vivian Lampe ... Wilma
- Juliane Melchthal... Sabine
- Onno Molenkamp ... teacher
- Miek Smit ... Joyce
- Ed van Gils ... Jacques
- Cor Witschge ... Taxichauffeur

== Production ==
According to Peter Cowie of the International Film Guide, this was the first Dutch feature to be shown at alternative art houses in the Netherlands and the first to be wholly financed by the government.
