= Zoeken naar Eileen (film) =

- Theatrical release poster
- Directed by: Rudolf van den Berg
- Written by: Leon de Winter
- Starring: Thom Hoffman; Lysette Anthony; Garry Whelan; Kenneth Herdigein; John van Dreelen; Hans Kemna
- Cinematography: Theo van de Sande
- Edited by: Wim Louwrier
- Music by: Boudewijn Tarenskeen
- Distributed by: Cannon Tuschinski Film Distribution
- Release date: 24 September 1987
- Running time: 98 minutes
- Country: Netherlands
- Language: Dutch

Zoeken naar Eileen is a 1987 Dutch film directed by Rudolf van den Berg. The international title of the film is Looking for Eileen, and is based on the book Zoeken naar Eileen W., written by Leon de Winter.

British actress Lysette Anthony played both Marian Faber (dubbed by Marijke Veugelers) and the title character Eileen.

== Plot ==
Philip de Wit becomes depressed after his young wife, Marian Faber, dies in a car accident. A year later while working in his late wife's bookstore, he briefly encounters a woman who closely resembles Marian. He becomes obsessed to find her, knowing only that she speaks English, is from Northern Ireland, and is called Eileen. He discovers that he is not the only person looking for Eileen.

== Cast ==
- Thom Hoffman - Philip de Wit
- Lysette Anthony - Marian Faber / Eileen W.
- Garry Whelan - Mark Nolan
- Kenneth Herdigein - Geoffrey
- John van Dreelen - Philips father
- Hans Kemna - Henk Faber
