= C. R. Hermans =

Dutch teacher, historian, and archaeologist (1805–1869)

Cornelis Rudolphus Hermans
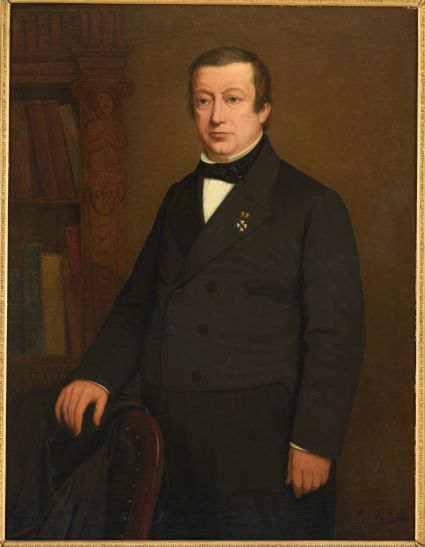
- C. R. Hermans as knight in the Order of the Oak Crown, by Frans van Beers in 1868.
- Born: 22 February 1805; Oss
- Died: 14 December 1869 (aged 64) 's-Hertogenbosch
- Occupations: historian librarian city archivist author head teacher
- Writing career
- Genres: literature history archaeology classics
- Notable works: Geschied- en aardrijkskundige beschrijving der provincie Noord-Braband (1845), Noord-Brabantse oudheden (1865)

C. R. Hermans (1805–1869) was a Dutch teacher, historian, and archaeologist specialized in the history of North-Brabant.

== Summary ==
Cornelis Rudolphus Hermans is regarded as the pioneer North-Brabant history and archaeology. He is also known as one of the founders of the Provinciaal Genootschap van Kunsten en Wetenschappen in Noord-Brabant (Provincial Society of Arts and Sciences in North-Brabant), predecessor of the Brabant-Collection and the Noordbrabants Museum

Hermans wrote multiple books and articles, and pioneered in several scientific fields. He left a large correspondence with regard collecting and judging archaeological finds, the decryption of old acts and charters, archeological excavations in North Brabant, and the quest to expand the society's library, coin and medal collections. Hermans also took steps in the history of literature. Many folk tales and legends were preserved, because he recorded them.

== Biography ==
=== Early years ===
Cornelis Rudolphus Hermans was the oldest of the 18 children of Herman Gijsbert Hermans and Isabella van Goor. His father was a silver- and goldsmith in Oss, the family profession. Herman Gijsbert was also a member of the municipality and a municipal tax collector. In 1819 Hermans went to the minor seminary at Beekvliet manor, a Catholic boarding school in Sint-Michielsgestel. From 1825 to 1830 he studied at the seminary on Nieuw-Herlaer Castle.

In 1830 he became deputy head teacher of the Latin School in Eindhoven. After the seminary, Hermans continued his studies at Leiden University. On 26 June 1834 He became a doctor in the classical languages with a thesis on the literary history of North-Brabant.

=== Headmaster of the City Grammar school ===
In 1834, North-Brabant had been a backward part of the Netherlands for about 200 years. This was still the case in 1834, but by then it had been free of oppression by the Protestant provinces for about 40 years. However, North-Brabant still had a rather negative image, and the history books of the Netherlands were still silent about its past. Hermans would try to change the image of North-Brabant by studying and giving attention to its glorious history.

Hermans was lucky that at the time Andreas van den Bogaerde van Terbrugge was the governor of North-Brabant. Van den Bogaerde came from Flanders, and was very interested in arts and sciences. He thought that telling history was one of the ways to strengthen North-Brabant. He acquainted Hermans with provincial official Jan Menu, and bookseller and bibliophile Hendrik Palier. Supported by these relations, Hermans was able to apply for the position of headmaster at the Latin School of 's-Hertogenbosch. Hermans got the position 14 October 1834 and would hold on to it till his death.

On 8 October 1835 Hermans also became a mathematics teacher at the much larger Royal School for Applied and Visual arts in 's Hertogenbosch. To help the school he did this job for only 100 guilders a year. A third job in education was his office as schoolopziener (kind of inspector) of the first school district in North-Brabant.

=== Marriage ===
In 1837 Hermans married Henrica Maria Laffertée (14 February 1808). They had six children, of which three died in infancy. Henrica Maria was the daughter of Adrianus Laffertée and Maria Magdalena Johanna Goris.

=== Provinciaal Genootschap van Kunsten en Wetenschappen in Noord-Brabant ===
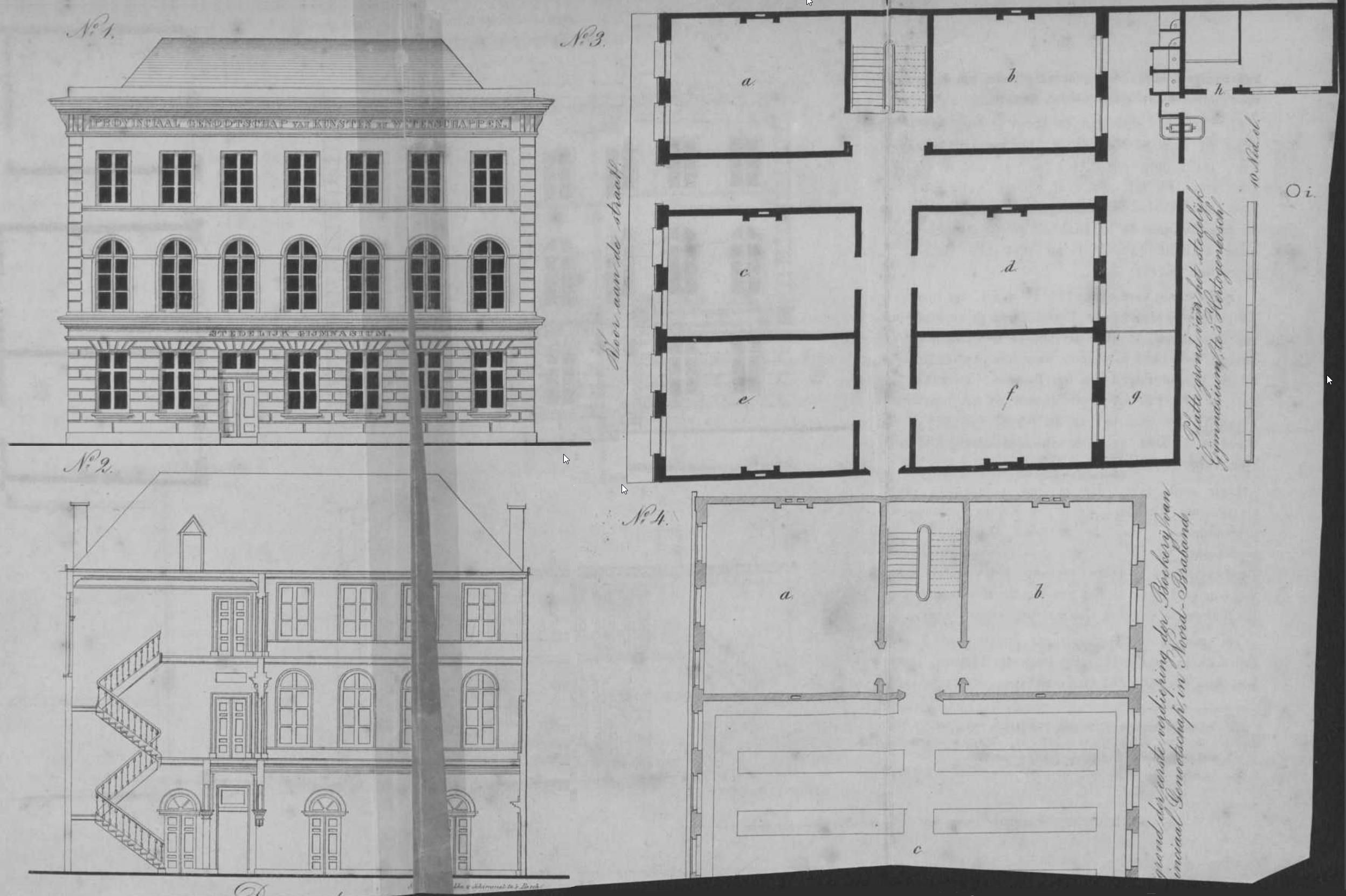
Combined building of the grammar school and provincial society at Papenhulst in 1855.

In his doctoral thesis Hermans promoted the foundation of a Provincial Society for Arts and Sciences in North-Brabant. For writing a history of North-Brabant, two things were needed: A provincial library which would give historians access to the required information; and people to investigate the information. For the latter he wanted to create a society of people who would study the language, history and antiquities of North-Brabant. It all led to the foundation of the 'Provinciaal Genootschap van Kunsten en Wetenschappen in Noord-Brabant'.

In 1837 the society was founded. There were seven founders: C. R. Hermans; governor Baron Andreas van den Bogaerde van Terbrugge; Carel Willem Pape, minister, and headmaster of the Latin school of Heusden; Bookseller Hendrik Pallier; and Jacobus Arnoldus Mutsaers, later secretary for the Roman Catholic religion. Even though he had taken the initiative, Hermans was not allowed to become a member of the board of the society, which soon became prestigious. This might have been a matter of social station.

Hermans was allowed to become the librarian of the society. He continued in this position till his death, and as such he was the by far most active member of the society. He collected all the history and literary works which he deemed necessary. In 1840 the library counted 1,440 books, in 1848 5,000, and in 1862 this was over 20,000. In part this was due to Hendrik Palier donating his private library to the society.

Hermans was also responsible for the archaeological collections and the coin collections, and their expansion. In this capacity Hermans made many purchases, and got many gifts for the archaeological collections. As a consequence, the society, with its library and archive, also served as a museum. In 1855 the Latin School, which was then called 'Gymnasium', and the Society were combined in a single new building on the Papenhulst in 's-Hertogenbosch.

In 1841 Hermans became city archivist of 's-Hertogenbosch. He published many acts, letters and others works, and in a few years, he had restored order in the city archives.

=== Pionier of North-Brabant Archaeology ===
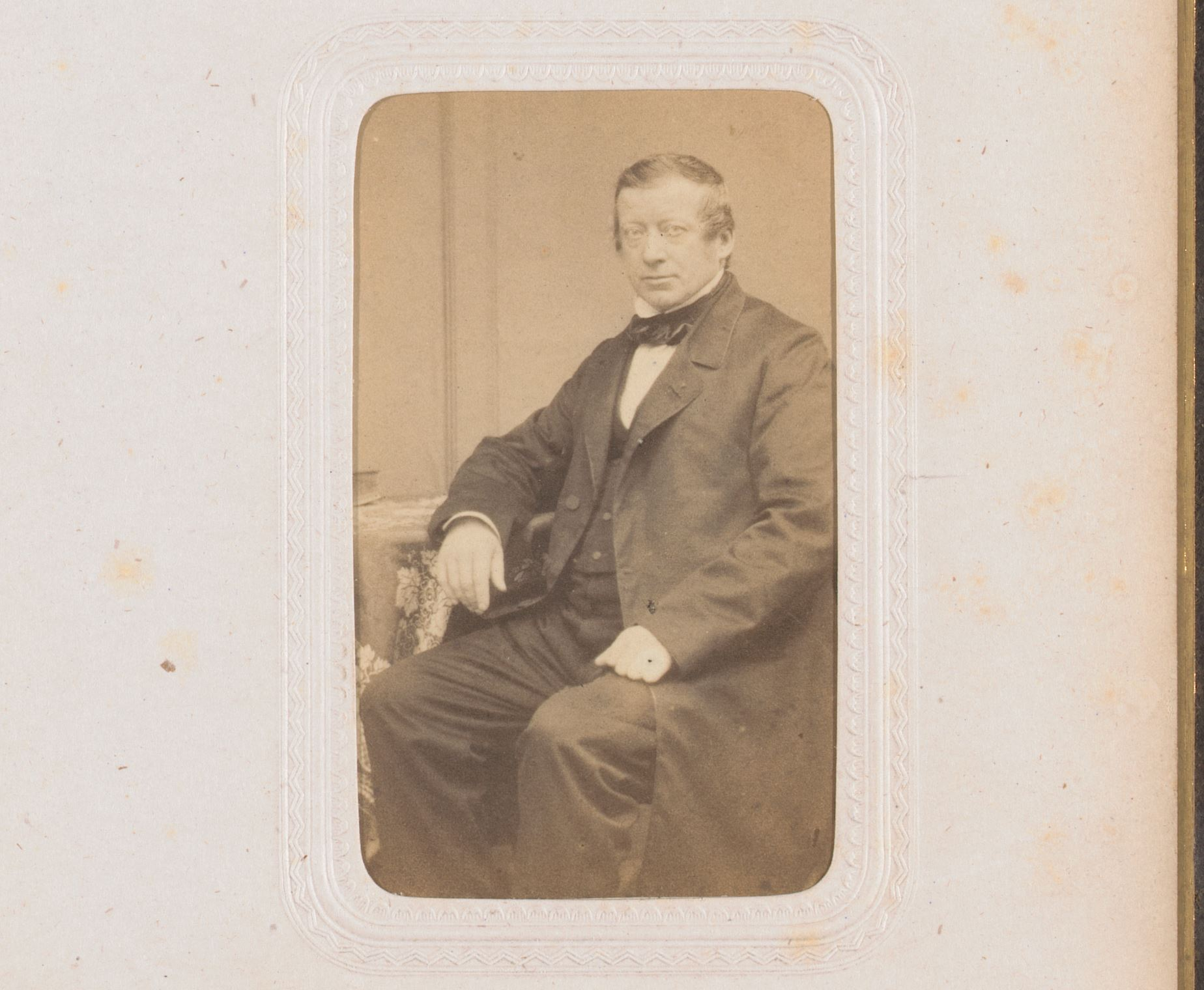
C.R. Hermans in the 60s of the 19th century.

In 1846 Hermans was appointed in an archaeological commission instituted by the provincial executive. It got the authority to find antiquities in North-Brabant. Hermans was the first to get involved in North-Brabant archeology in a scientific way, and the first to excavate in the province for a scientific purpose. One of his major finds was the discovery of the Roman road from Tongeren to Nijmegen. After studying old historical sources, among them the Peutinger map, Hermans found remains of the road at multiple locations in the Land van Cuijk between 1860 and 1864. His finds were documented well enough to allow them to be traced back to modern locations. Hermans also investigated the Hercules Magusanus votive stone found near Sint-Michielsgestel.

Hermans was also involved in the excavation of multiple burial mounds. Here, the focus was on collecting finds. The importance of collecting scientific data like measurements, or the traces of piles, and the concept of roundels were not yet known. Hermans' significance on this terrain was therefore primarily in the publication of his findings.

== Selected works ==
- Dissertatio inauguralis literaria sive introductio in notitiam rei literariae maxime provinciae Brabantiae Septentrionalis. (1834)
- Wiskunde der ambachtslieden (1837) eene handleiding etc.
- Geschiedkundig Mengelwerk over de Provincie Noord-Braband I. (1840)
- Geschiedkundig Mengelwerk over de Provincie Noord-Braband II. (1841)
- Geschied- en aardrijkskundige beschrijving der provincie Noord-Braband (1845)
- Noordbrabants Oudheden. (1865)
- Geschiedenis der Rederijkers in Noord-Brabant. (1867)
