= Big Arsenal (Groot Tuighuis) =

- Groot Tuighuis
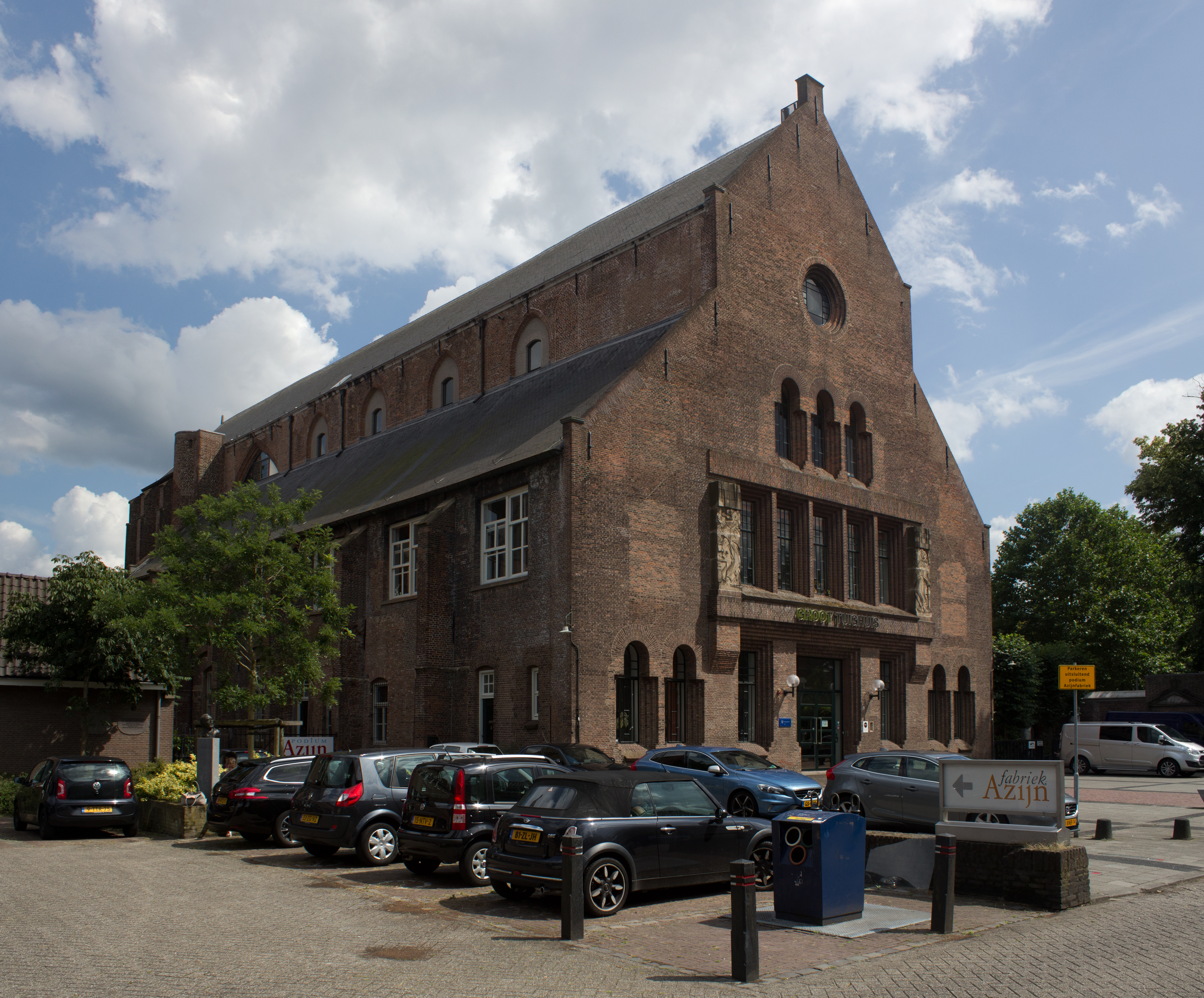
- Big Arsenal

- North Brabant

General information
- Location: Bethaniestraat 4 's-Hertogenbosch, Netherlands
- Coordinates: 51.687100°N 5.312883°E
- Construction started: 1430

Design and construction
- Architect: Oscar Leeuw western façade

Website
- Groot Tuighuis

The Big Arsenal, in Dutch: Groot Tuighuis, in 's-Hertogenbosch, Netherlands, is also known as Old St. James Church, or Oude Sint Jacobskerk. It is the former location of the Noordbrabants Museum. It now houses the municipal heritage department and its storage. It is open to visitors four days a week.

== St. James Church ==
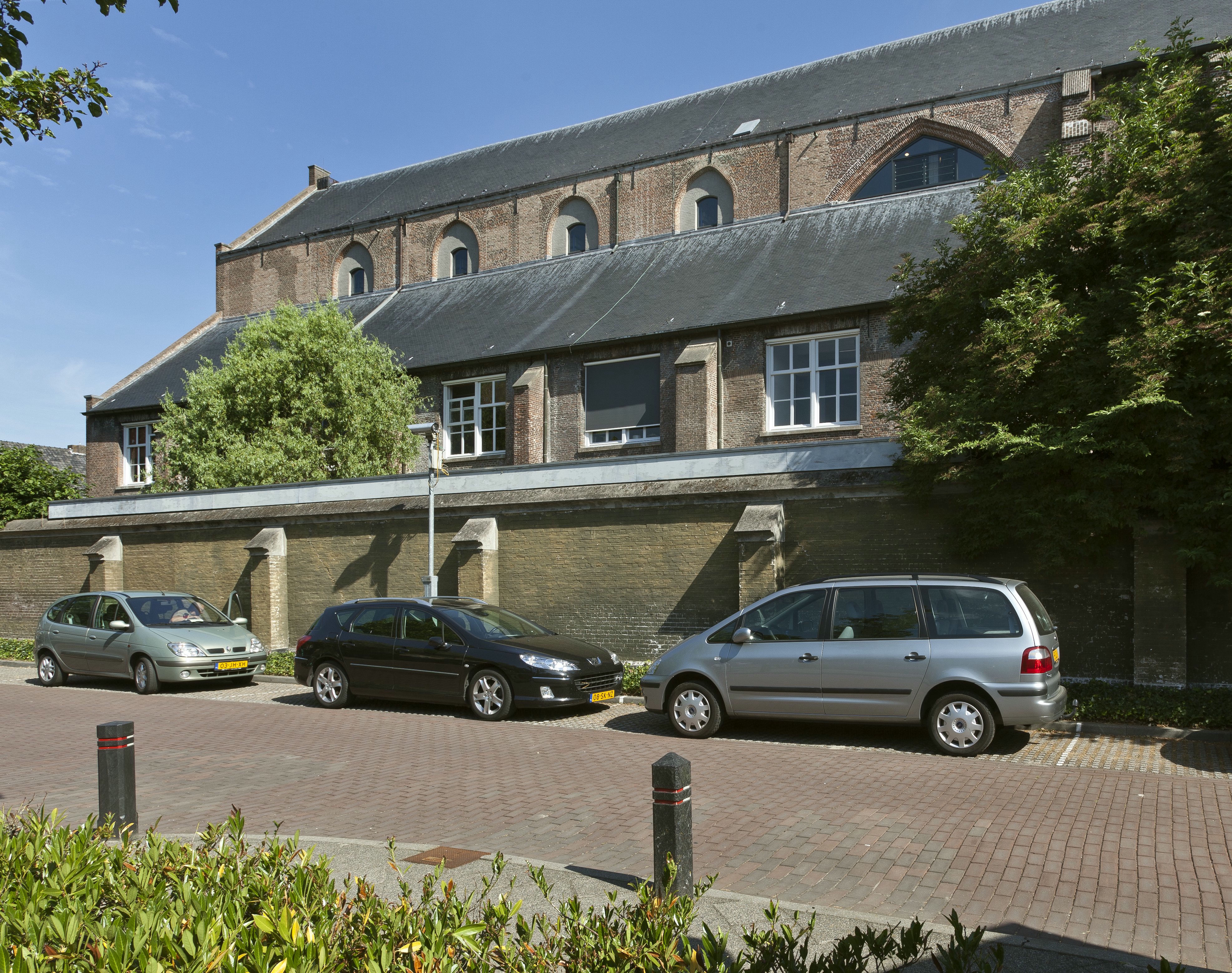
Southern facade. Start of planned nave on the right.

=== St. James Church (1430-1629) ===
In 1430 the brotherhood of St James got permission to build a chapel at the Windmolenberg in 's-Hertogenbosch. The main 1430 altar was dedicated to James the Great, and was built together with a refuge for pilgrims to Santiago de Compostela. Later, altars for Mary (1478) and Saint Quirinus were made.

In 1569 the new parish of St. James was founded in 's-Hertogenbosch. It got the Chapel as its parish church. The western limit of the parish was at the Geerlingse Bridge, but apart from this small part of the city it also included grounds outside of the city stretching towards Rosmalen. By 1584 the chapel had been enlarged to the current size.

The church is a three-aisle basilica with a single nave choir. The side façades show that side-naves were planned, especially on the south side. These were never started, probably because 's-Hertogenbosch was in the frontline of the Eighty Years' War by 1584. The northern façade has a stair tower at this planned junction. A 3D visualization of the old church has been made.

=== Protestant Church (1629-1650) ===
After the Siege of 's-Hertogenbosch in 1629, the Church was expropriated by the victors. It then served as a Protestant church till 1650.

== Big Arsenal ==
=== St. James Barracks (1650-1918) ===
In 1650 the building became a wagon house. From 1668 till 1752 the church was a stable. In 1744 the James' Barracks Jacobskazerne was built next to the church. It was one of several barracks that were built in 's-Hertogenbosch at the time. Next to the building is a memorial stone from the 1744 barracks.

=== Big Arsenal (1752) ===
In 1752 the church got multiple floors to store weaponry. This was a very heavy construction, which is still visible today. It also meant that all Gothic windows were walled up and were replaced by smaller ones. The roof was also replaced and the entrance façade renewed. This military renovation still dominates the view of the church.

In the nineteenth a military complex grew around these buildings. From 1880-1920 the barracks were used by the infantry and known as Big Arsenal Barracks, or Kazerne Groot Tuighuys. The name Tuighuis is an obsolete Dutch word for Arsenal, in Dutch: Arsenaal. In 1918 the infantry left the barracks.

== Noordbrabants Museum (1925-1986) ==
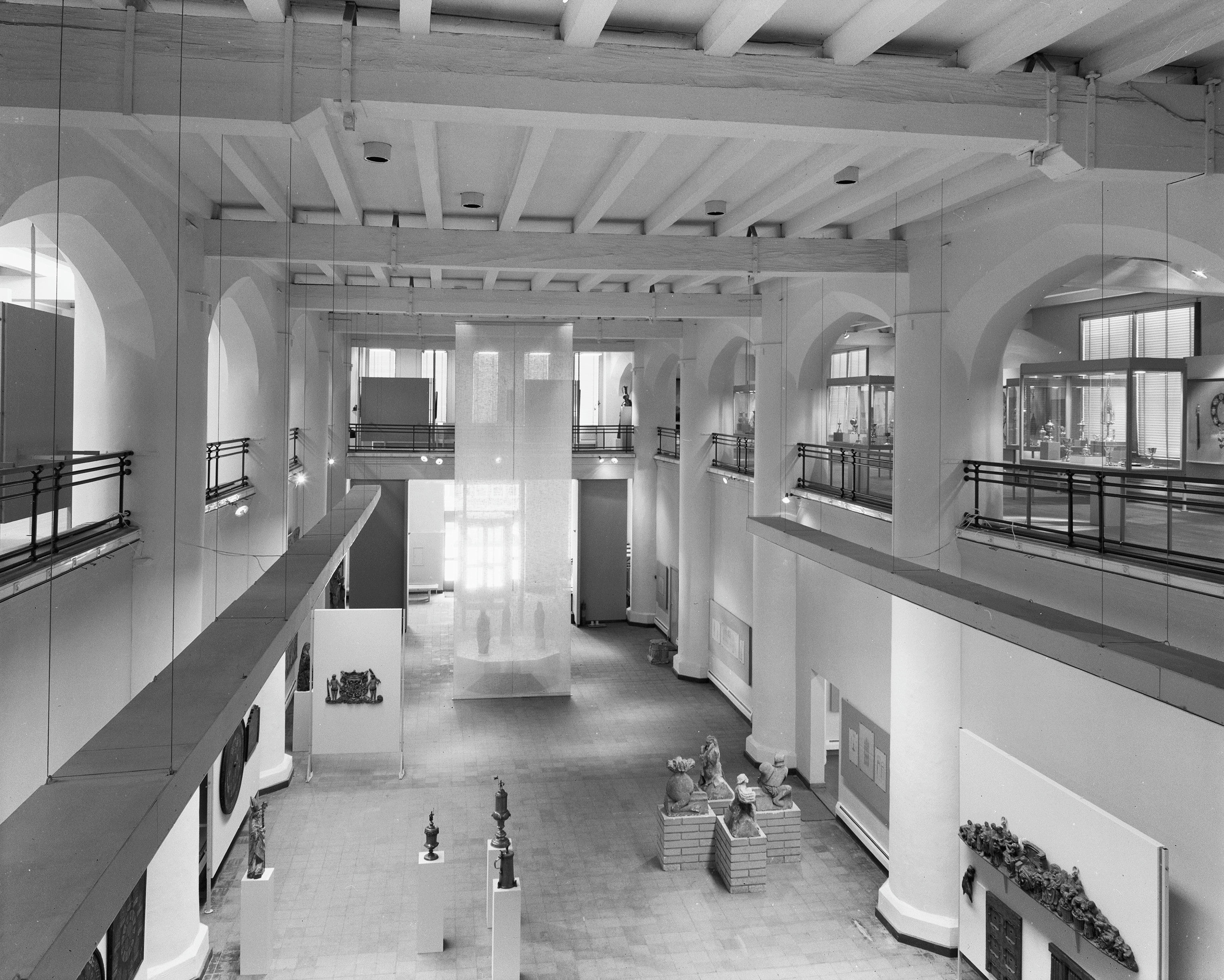
Interior of Noordbrabants Museum (1968)

=== The museum is founded ===
The next occupant of the Big Arsenal was the Noordbrabants Museum. The Provincial society for arts and sciences in North Brabant, Provinciaal Genootschap van Kunsten en Wetenschappen in Noord-Brabant, was a society dedicated to promoting Arts & Sciences. To support research it had a very large library. The society also had the ambition to found a museum in 's-Hertogenbosch. In 1919 a bequest of 110,000 guilders, made by C.P.D. Pape gave the society the means to realize this ambition. It started to look for a building, and found the Big Arsenal (Groot Tuighuis). The solid floors which had been created inside the building, made it the perfect place for the museum with its large library. The military authorities agreed to hand the Big Arsenal to the society for a small lease of 200 guilders.

=== The building is changed to become a museum ===
On handing over the building, the Authorities made the provision that Oscar Leeuw, architect of Museum Kam in Nijmegen, would change it to a suitable building. His main contribution is the current western façade, which made a suitable entrance. The contract was signed in 1924, and in 1925 the 'Centraal Noord Brabantsch Museum' was opened.

Shortly after the opening of the museum, a description was given of the modest beginnings of the museum: A hall had been made in the central nave of the Big Arsenal. It was devoted to art work, mainly sculptures. Behind the hall the choir housed the stately meeting room of the society. Near the choir were stairs to the upper galleries. The galleries gave an overview of the provincial and city history. The move to the Big Arsenal was crucial for the museum, because it got a space to start its collections and to exhibit them.

=== The museum outgrows the church ===
In September 1967 a large exposition of works by Hieronymus Bosch was held in the museum on account of the 450th anniversary of his passing. It was unique for North Brabant to have such a major exposition. In these decades the activities of the museum greatly increased, as did the cultural ambitions of the city. A study of the required housing for the museum then showed that the church would not be sufficient for future developments. In 1986 the museum then left for its current building on Verwerstraat.

== BAM and Erfgoed 's-Hertogenbosch (Since 1988) ==
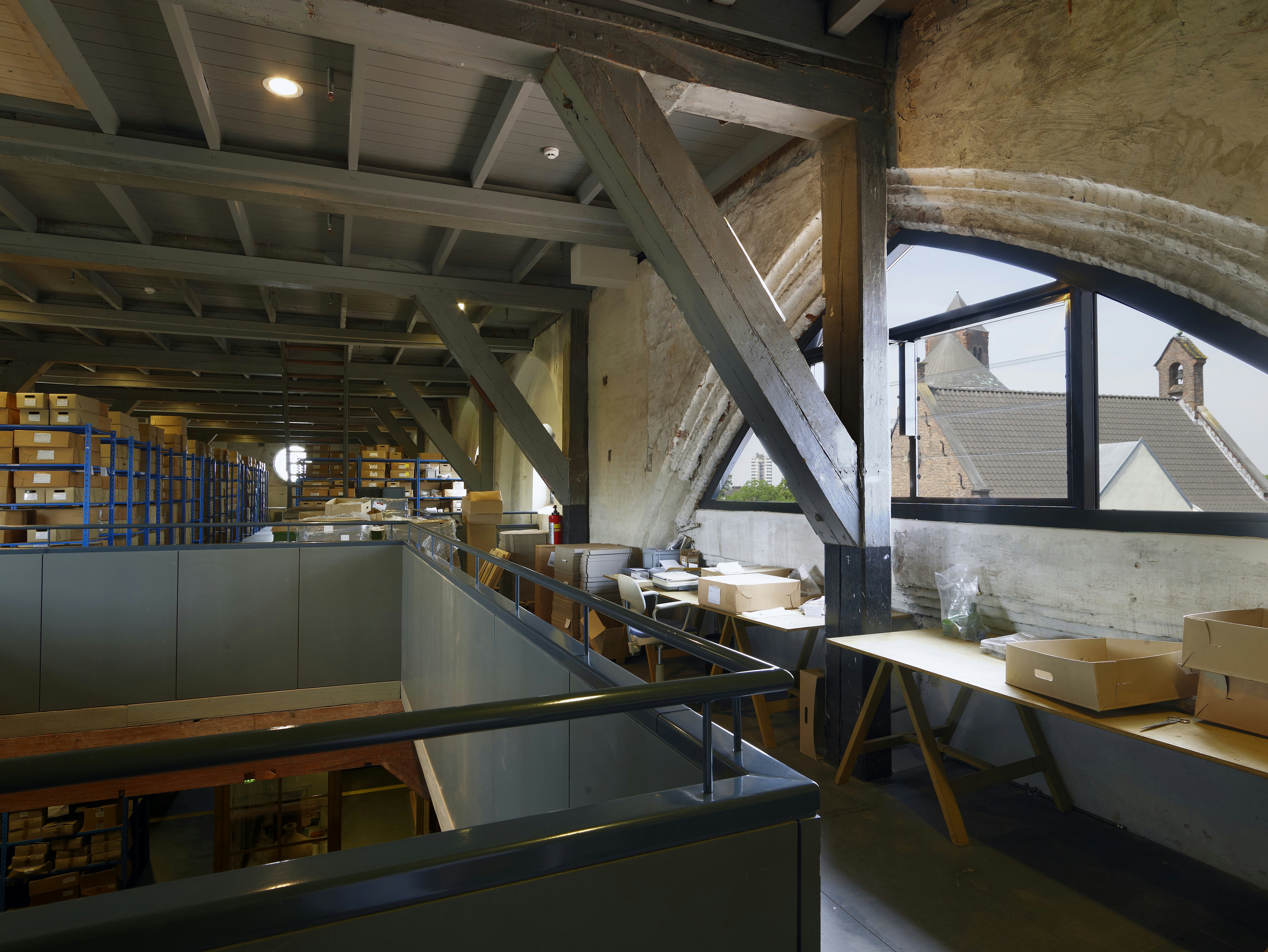
Interior to the west in 2010

=== BAM Storage ===
From 1988 onwards the church was used by the municipal department for Building History, Archaeology and Monuments (BAM). It used it as a storage.

=== De Azijnfabriek ===
In 1989 the former choir became Podium de Azijnfabriek with a separate entrance. It is a small venue that can be hired for concerts and other cultural activities. It can receive 150-285 persons.Podium Azijn In 2020 the Azijnfabriek was still housed in the choir. It was expected to move to new housing after the summer of 2021.

=== Heritage Department ===
In 2014 's-Hertogenbosch started a project to merge a number of municipal departments to a single Erfgoed (heritage) department. These were the municipal archive, BAM and the task force for the fortifications. These would have offices for 45 staff at the Big Arsenal. The most used parts of the physical archive, about 3 kilometers of paper, would also move to the Arsenal. For the archaeology service, the church continued as a workplace and storage.

The building is open to the public four days a week. The ground floor has a changing exposition of archaeological finds in the municipality. There is also a so-called ArcheoHotspot, which shows how archaeologists work. In 2019 there was an exposition about the prosecution of local Sinti and Roma during World War II.
