= The Johnsons =

- Theatrical release poster
- Directed by: Rudolf van den Berg
- Written by: Roy Frumkes; Rocco Simonelli
- Produced by: Haig Balian; Chris Brouwer
- Starring: Monique van de Ven; Esmée de la Bretonière; Kenneth Herdigein
- Cinematography: Theo Bierkens
- Edited by: Wim Louwrier
- Music by: Patrick Seymour
- Production company: Movies Film Productions
- Distributed by: Meteor Film
- Release date: 14 February 1992
- Running time: 103 minutes
- Country: Netherlands
- Language: Dutch
- Budget: ƒ 5,000,000 ($2,640,681)

The Johnsons (Dutch: De Johnsons) is a 1992 Dutch horror film thriller directed by Rudolf van den Berg. It also known under the title Xangadix. The film was nominated for a Fantasy Film Award at the Porto Film Festival in Portugal. The music composed by Patrick Seymour (Eurythmics) won an award for Best Soundtrack at the Avoriaz Film Festival in France and at the Imagfic Film Festival in Spain. The movie also received an award for its special effects. It was the last Dutch horror motion picture in the twentieth century and is considered to be one of the best Dutch horror (Netherhorror) feature films of all time, along with The Lift, Amsterdamned and The Human Centipede.

== Plot ==
Victoria Lucas (played by Monique van de Ven) is a single mother who lives with her teenage daughter Emalee (played by Esmee de la Bretonière) in an apartment. Emalee is not normal, having come to life through test tube fertilization, under the assistance of Dr. Johnson. The doctor has not only made Emalee, but in secret also used the eggs of Victoria to make seven boys.

When Emalee is 14 years, her mother takes her on a camping holiday in the Biesbosch. From her 14th birthday, Emalee begins to suffer from nightmares, about seven identical men that are willing to do anything to fertilize her to fulfill a dark prophecy.

== Cast ==
- Monique van de Ven as Victoria Lucas
- Esmée de la Bretonière as Emalee Lucas
- Kenneth Herdigein as Professor Keller
- Rik van Uffelen as de Graaf
- Otto Sterman as vader Keller
- Olga Zuiderhoek as Angela
- Nelly Frijda as Tante van Peter
- Miguel Stigter as Johnson 1, Bossie
- Diederik van Nederveen as Johnson 2, Dakkie
- Erik van Wilsum as Johnson 3, Tellie
- Marcel Colin as Johnson 4, Droppie
- Kees Hulst as Jansma
- Nathan Moll as Johnson 5, Kniffie
- Jan-Mark Wams as Johnson 6, Koppie
- Michel Bonset as Johnson 7, Kurkie

== Production ==
The script for The Johnsons was originally written for an American market and was to have been called The Johnson Blues. This iteration would have featured hillbillies in New York City and was described as "Deliverance meets Crocodile Dundee meets Straw Dogs". Roles were written with actors Glenda Jackson and Oliver Reed in mind, however the production was reworked to become The Johnsons and was moved to the Netherlands when the project proved unsuccessful in the United States. Now a Dutch production, Ruud van Hemert was brought on to serve as director, but was fired three weeks prior to filming. Rudolf van den Berg was brought on as the new director, marking a departure from his prior film style.

== Documentary ==
In 2017, directors Bram Roza and Yfke van Berckelaer made a documentary about this obscure Dutch horror film called XANGADIX LIVES!.
