= Rudolf van den Berg =

Dutch writer and director (1949–2025)

- Born: 6 January 1949; Rotterdam, Netherlands
- Died: 12 July 2025 (aged 76)
- Occupations: Film director, screenwriter
- Years active: 1976–2025
- Website: www.rudolfvandenberg.com

Rudolf van den Berg (Dutch pronunciation: [ˈrydɔl(ə)(f) fɑn də(m) ˈbɛr(ə)x]; 6 January 1949 – 12 July 2025) was a Dutch film director and screenwriter.

== Career ==
Van den Berg made films and documentaries for over thirty years. Often praised while sometimes being criticized, Van den Berg's work always succeeded in stirring passionate reactions from the viewers.

His eighth feature film Tirza was released in September 2010. It is a heart-breaking, edgy story of a man in search of his missing daughter. In the desert of Namibia the father will be forced to confront the man who destroyed the life of his favorite child. The film was selected as the Dutch entry for the Best Foreign Language Film at the 83rd Academy Awards but it didn't make the final shortlist.

Süskind, a war story, written by Chris W. Mitchell and Van den Berg himself was released on 19 January 2012. Just as Tirza, it is also a coproduction between Cadenza Films and FuWorks.

== Death ==
Van den Berg died from a cardiac arrest on 12 July 2025, at the age of 76.

== Filmography ==
- 1976 : Algerian Times (documentary; director)
- 1979 : The Alien's Place (documentary; director)
- 1982 : Sal Santen Rebel (documentary; writer/director)
- 1984 : Bastille (writer/director)
- 1985 : Stranger at Home (documentary; writer/director)
- 1987 : Looking for Eileen (writer/director)
- 1989 : Evenings (director)
- 1992 : De Johnsons (director)
- 1996 : The Cold Light of Day (director)
- 1997 : For My Baby (writer/director)
- 1998 : Oud Geld (TV) (director)
- 1998 : De Keerzijde (TV) (director)
- 2001 : Snapshots (writer/director)
- 2007 : Steel & Lavender (documentary; writer/director)
- 2008 : Schatz (documentary; writer/director)
- 2010 : Tirza (writer/director)
- 2012 : Süskind (writer/director)
- 2016 : A Real Vermeer (writer/director)
