= Environmental Monitoring and Assessment =

- Discipline: Environmental monitoring and assessment
- Language: English
- Edited by: G.B. Wiersma

Publication details
- History: 1981–present
- Publisher: Springer (Netherlands)
- Frequency: Weekly
- Impact factor: 3.0 (2022)

Standard abbreviations
- ISO 4: Environ. Monit. Assess.

Indexing
- CODEN: EMASDH
- ISSN: 0167-6369 (print); 1573-2959 (web)
- LCCN: 82641109
- OCLC no.: 07589096

Links
- Journal homepage

Environmental Monitoring and Assessment, first published in 1981, is a weekly, peer-reviewed, scientific journal published by Springer. The managing editor is G.B. Wiersma (University of Maine).

== Aims and scope ==
=== Data analysis ===
The focus of this journal is the results of analyzed data pertaining to assessment and monitoring of risks that may affect the environment and human beings. The analysis is also synthesised with various categories of health data. The data gathered from the studies of diseases in human populations (risk factors and remedies), and toxicological ramifications obtained from the data analysis is published as well. Coverage includes, the steps and process of assessing risks from exposure to pollution.

=== Systems monitoring ===
Coverage includes environmental systems monitoring from conception to configuration, implementation, and management. These monitoring systems are designed to gather data pertaining to individuals and populations.

=== Broad topical coverage ===
In general, environmental management, ecology, environmental toxicology, pollution remediation, along with environmental monitoring and analysis are related subjects.

== Abstracting and indexing ==
This journal is indexed in the following databases.

- AGRICOLA
- Science Citation Index Expanded
- Current Contents/Agriculture, Biology & Environmental Sciences
- The Zoological Record
- BIOSIS Previews
- Chemical Abstracts Service
- Scopus
- Index Medicus
- MEDLINE
- PubMed
- CAB Abstracts
- Global Health
- CAB International
- Geobase
- Compendex
- International Bibliography of Periodical Literature
- Food Science and Technology Abstracts
- UGC Care List (INDIA)

== See also ==
- Radiation monitoring
- Environmental monitoring
- Strategic Environmental Assessment
- Institute for Environment and Sustainability
