= Canadian Journal of Netherlandic Studies =

- Discipline: Dutch studies
- Language: English, French, Dutch
- Edited by: Krystyna Henke

Publication details
- History: 1979-present
- Publisher: Canadian Association for the Advancement of Netherlandic Studies (Canada)
- Frequency: Biannually
- Open access: Yes

Standard abbreviations
- ISO 4: Can. J. Neth. Stud.

Indexing
- ISSN: 0225-0500
- OCLC no.: 428441598

Links
- Journal homepage; Online access; Online archive

The Canadian Journal of Netherlandic Studies (French: Revue canadienne d'études néerlandaises) is an academic journal covering Dutch studies. It is the official journal of the Canadian Association for the Advancement of Netherlandic Studies (French: Association canadienne pour l'avancement des études néerlandaises). It is published since 1979 and appears in two issues per year. All issues published since 1979 are now digitised and are available on line. https://caans-acaen.ca/category/journals/ (January 2022).

== Abstracting and Indexing ==
- Bibliographie van Nederlandse taal- en literatuurwetenschap
- Linguistic Bibliography
- Bibliography of the History of Art
- Historical Abstracts
- America: History & Life
- MLA Bibliography
