= Zoeken naar Eileen W. =

1981 novel by Leon de Winter

- Author: Leon de Winter
- Original title: Zoeken naar Eileen W. Also translated to: Looking for Eileen W.
- Language: Dutch
- Publisher: Uitgeverij Knipscheer
- Publication date: 1981
- Publication place: Netherlands
- ISBN: 90-6265-413-4
- OCLC: 69117439

Zoeken naar Eileen W. is a novel written by Leon de Winter, first published January 1, 1981.

== Plot ==
A young man has just lost his young girlfriend, and becomes depressed. But then he meets a woman which resembles his late girlfriend a lot. Their meeting is brief, but the main character knows enough to know that he only wants her from that moment on. The only thing he knows of her, is that she speaks English, that she is from Northern Ireland and that she is called Eileen.
