= City Gymnasium ('s-Hertogenbosch) =

- Stedelijk Gymnasium
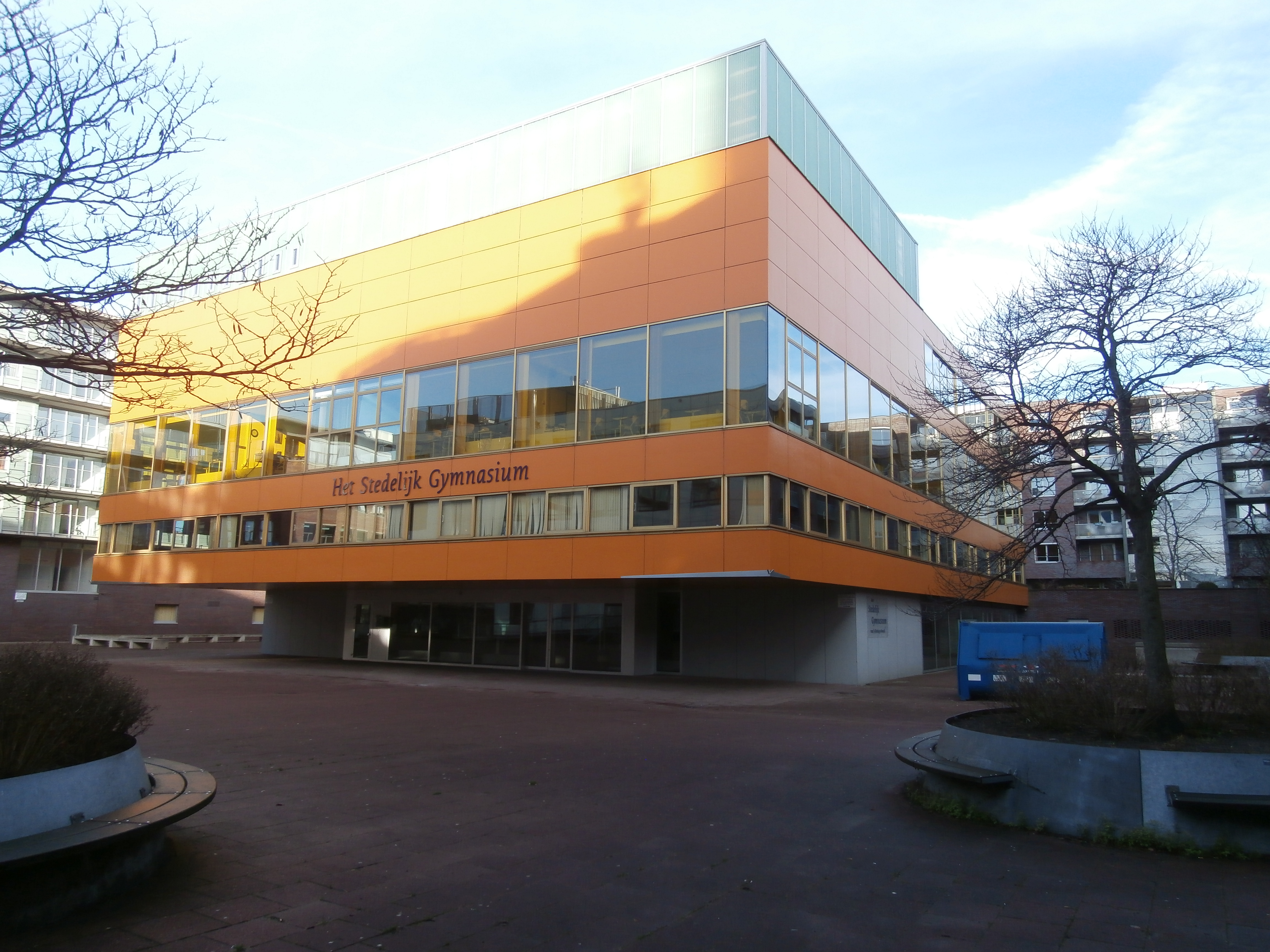
- City Gymnasium from the south-east
- 's-Hertogenbosch; Netherlands

Information
- Type: Categoraal gymnasium
- Motto: Non scholae sed vitae discimus (We leren niet voor school, maar voor het leven / we leren niet van school, maar van het leven)
- Established: 1274
- Authority: Onderwijsstichting Zelfstandige Gymnasia (OSZG)
- Principal: Drs. A. Hulsman
- Staff: 77
- Teaching staff: 66
- Enrollment: 827 (2018-2019)
- Newspaper: Feuniks, het Weekeindje
- Website: https://www.stedgymdenbosch.nl/

The City Gymnasium of 's-Hertogenbosch is a grammar school, which is known as a gymnasium in the Netherlands. It is the second oldest school of the Netherlands.

== History ==
=== Organized by the church ===
The City Gymnasium is the direct continuation of the medieval Latin school. The Latin School of 's-Hertogenbosch was mentioned in the archives for the first time in 1274, making it the second oldest still existing grammar school of the Netherlands (the oldest is the Johan de Witt-gymnasium in Dordrecht). The school used to belong to the chapter of St. John's church. When the Jesuits arrived in 's-Hertogenbosch in 1609, they took control of the school.

=== City School ===
After the 1629 Siege of 's-Hertogenbosch, the city magistrate got authority over education, which then had to teach along the lines of the Reformation.

=== Dutch Latin School ===
It was during the French period that subjects like history and geography were taught for the first time. In 1809 the municipality of 's-Hertogenbosch bought a house on the Papenhulst to house the Latin School. In 1815 a decree regulated the organization of all Dutch Latin schools. Some numbers are available on the rather low number of students that the Latin School had in the early nineteenth century. On 31 December 1839 the Latin School had 19 students. On 31 December 1840 the number of students had diminished to just 14. On 31 December 1841 it was 19. In 1844 the latest count was 12. In 1845 the latest count was 18. In 1846 this was 15. In 1847 it was also 15.

=== The broad gymnasium ===
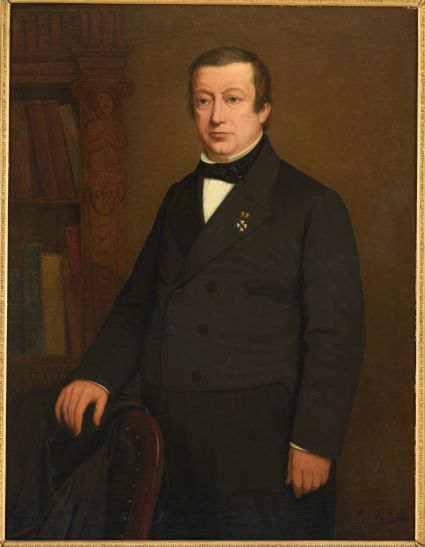
C.R. Hermans (1805–1869), principal from 1834

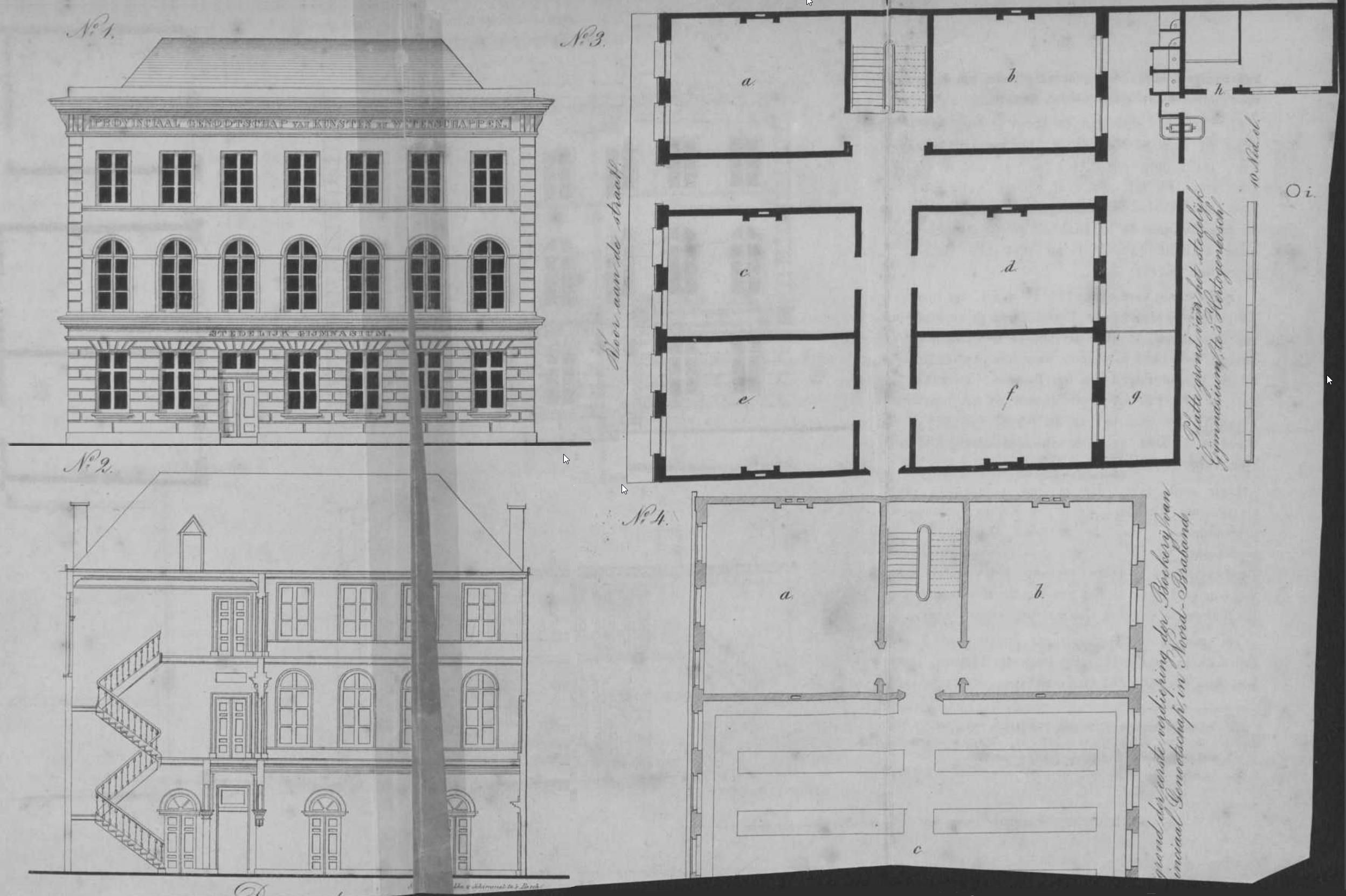
Design of building on the west side of Papenhulst

In October 1847 the Minister of the Interior made the Latin School of 's-Hertogenbosch a gymnasium. The name Stedelijk Gymnasium van 's-Hertogenbosch also surfaced in 1847. In November 1847 the school then advertised for teachers in mathematics, Dutch, French, German and English. On 18 September 1848 the City Gymnasium school was opened.

The gymnasium had two departments. The first department prepared for university, while the other department focused on preparing for service in the army, navy, commerce or other societal positions that required a good education. The first department taught Latin, Greek, ancient literature, antiquities, mythology, ancient geography, and general and Dutch history. The second department taught calculus, logic and geometry; basics of physics, chemistry, and mechanics as applied to commerce, industry and manufacturing; geography; general and Dutch history; Dutch, French, German and English language and literature; and finally double-entry bookkeeping. The first department would take six years of study, the second only three years. The first rector of the gymnasium was the old rector of the Latin School, C. R. Hermans.

In July 1853 the Provincial Society for Art and Sciences Provinciaal Genootschap van Kunsten en Wetenschappen, the City Gymnasium and the municipality made a plan for a new building. It would house the gymnasium and the great library and cabinet of curiosities of the society. The municipality approved and offered to contribute 6,000 guilders. In July 1854 the provincial authorities approved to contribute 3,000 guilders for building the rooms for the society library. Meanwhile, the cost rose to 14,305, which substantially increased the cost for the municipality. In September 1854 the order for construction of the new school was given.

By October 1855 the new building on the west side of Papenhulst was ready. It combined the school and the library of the society. It was situated on the grounds of the Latin School, with the house of the principal of the school to the west, and the warehouse of A. P. Sopers to the east, a few buildings north of the casino society.

=== The HBS is split off ===
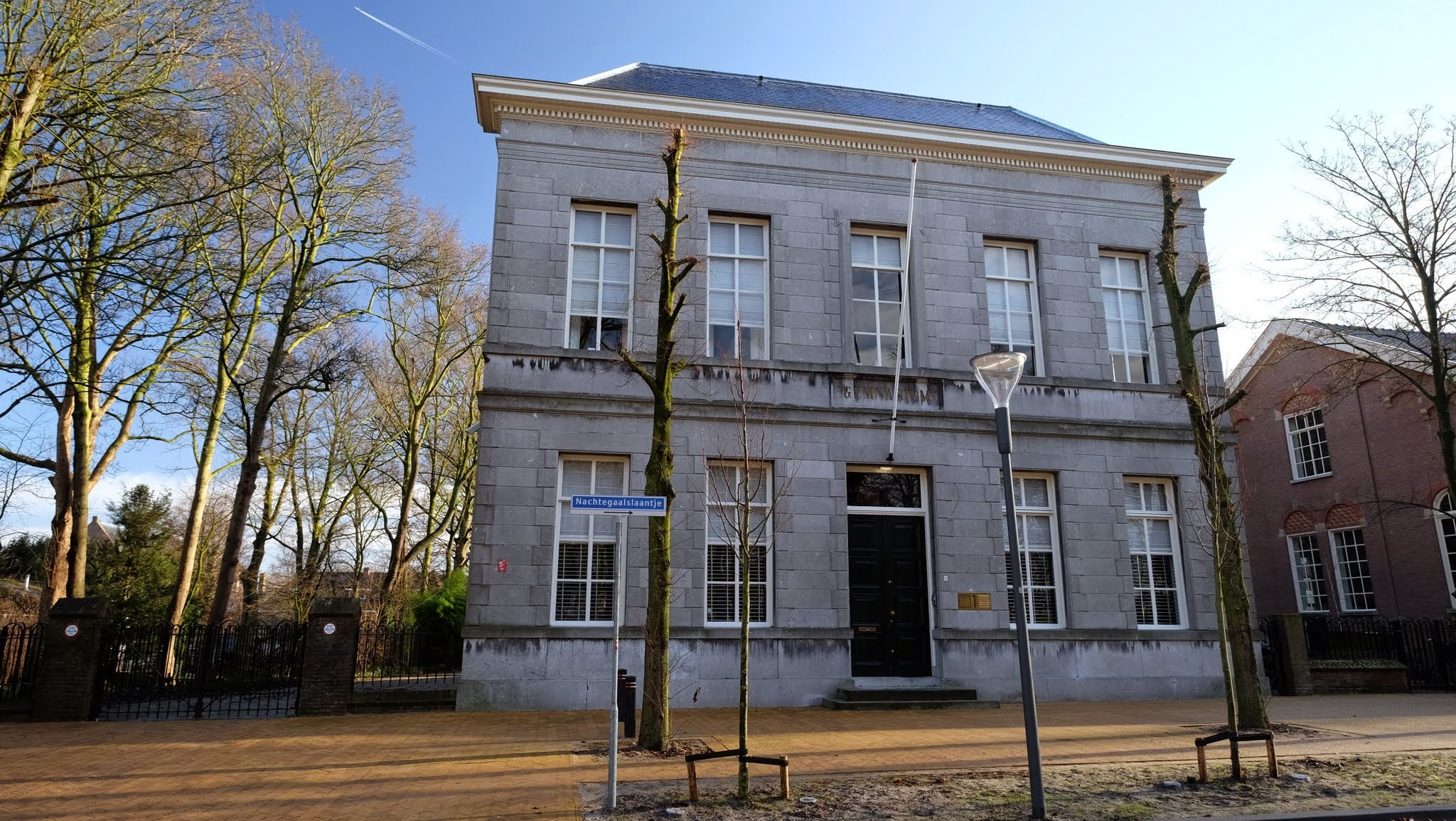
Previous location on Nachtegaalslaantje

In the 1850s there was quite some criticism about the curriculum of the second (practical) department of the gymnasium. By 1854 it had been lengthened to four years. By that time teaching about commercial subjects, drawing and clear writing were added. Indeed, separate teachers were appointed for clear writing and straight drawing in 1855. By 1857 the number of students had increased to 60, and the second department got a special class to prepare for the military academies.

In 1863 the desire to have better practical secondary education in the Netherlands led to the law that established the very successful Hogere Burgerschool (HBS). In August 1863 the minister for education wrote the municipal council that he thought that the second department of the gymnasium would be a good core for a new HBS. In October 1863 the council agreed to offer classrooms for the HBS. By September 1865 the municipality had decided to give the building of the gymnasium and provincial society to the national government. In 1925 this former building of the gymnasium was demolished.

The student numbers in 1866 showed the limited success of the broad gymnasium. That year it had only 39 students in both departments. Meanwhile, the Art Academy had over 300. The HBS was much more popular: its 1867–1868 course started with just 40 students, and had 55 by 31 December 1867. On 24 July 1867 the three-year HBS of 's-Hertogenbosch was officially established. Staff was appointed on 1 September 1867. A. L. Lamers became the first president and teacher. Other teachers appointed on 1 September were J. Ringeling, J. M. Sistermans, E. H. P. van der Ven, and J. P. Ritschie. These were followed in September by H. Löhbach from Cologne and J. M. Servais.

=== The new gymnasium ===
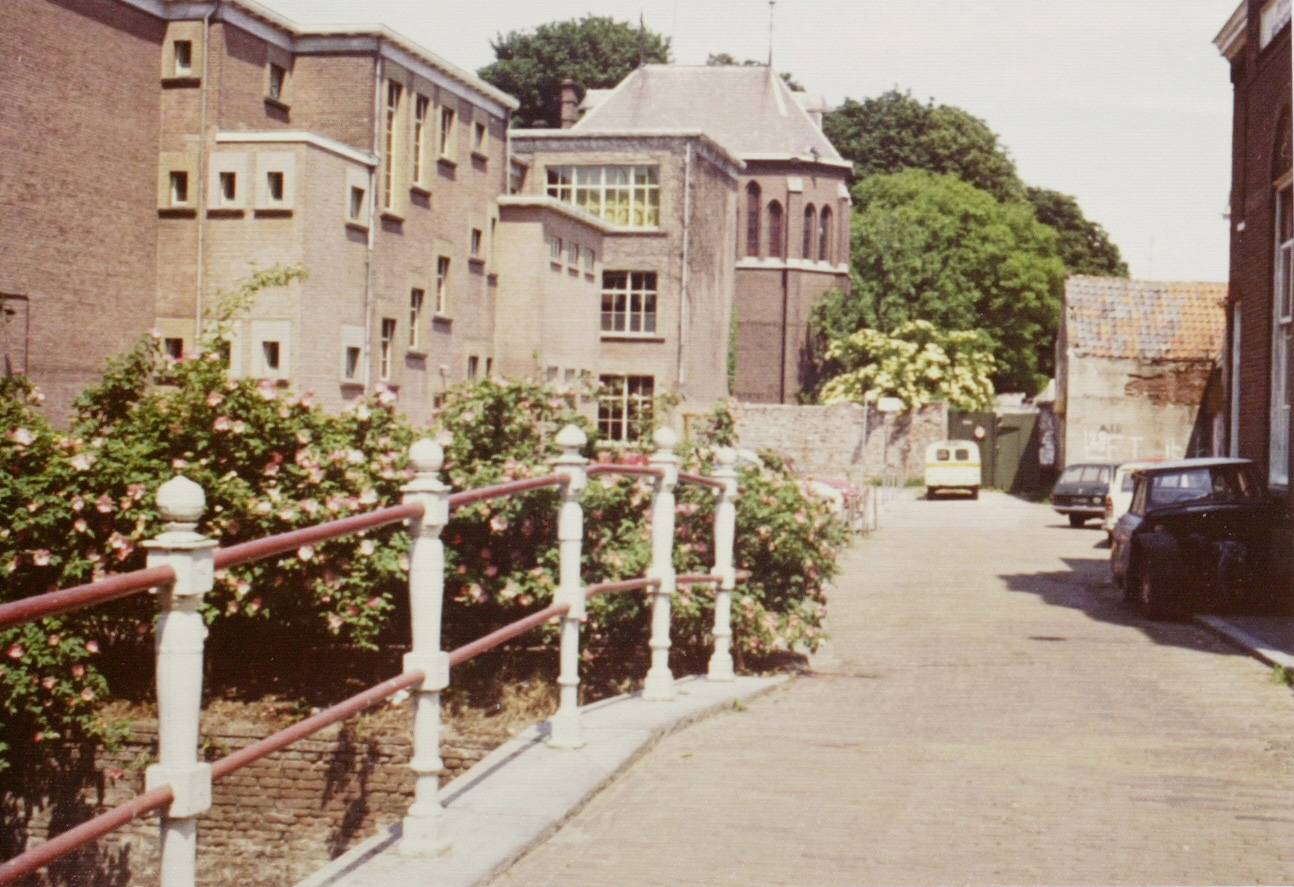
In den Boerenmouw, 1974

The establishment of the HBS meant that the gymnasium lost its second department, and that "only the old Latin School was left". So, the old school was returned to the pre-1847 situation. The effect of the establishment of the HBS was even worse than imagined. In early 1867 it became clear that the only lessons still given at the gymnasium were those in Latin and Greek. Meanwhile, the HBS wanted to expand to a five-year course. In July 1868 the minister stated that he would agree to a four-year course if the municipality provided classrooms.

The City Gymnasium no longer required a large building. The 1867–1868 course started with just 18 students. The gymnasium was revived by a new law on secondary education that broadened its scope. In July 1879 the municipality appointed these teachers for the gymnasium: G. Lamerschop for French and German; J. Schüngel for physics and chemistry; A. L. Lamers and F. A. W. Schäfer for natural history; J. H. A. van Ravenhorst for English; and J. Gleuns for mathematics. Gleuns refused the appointment, after which the offered salary was increased. R. Kruisinga Homan became the new vice-president. The teachers of Dutch, history and geography were also teachers of the HBS, something that the education minister did not like. In December 1879 two teachers for Dutch, geography and history were then appointed at the school.

In August 1879 there was a tender for preparing grounds east of the Nachtegaalslaantje, meant for placement of the gymnasium building. On 25 August construction of the foundations and basement for the buildings of the gymnasium were tendered. In December 1880 the plan for the building on Nachtegaalslaantje was approved. On 14 February 1880 construction was tendered. This is the building on the east side of Nachtegaalslaantje that still has the word Gymnasium on the façade.

The reform to a new type of gymnasium and the new building had the desired effects. On 1 January 1880 there were 11 teachers and 34 students. The schoolyear 1882–1883 had 57 students. However, the reform gave rise to new challenges. Students who wanted to study law or theology now had to pass exams in mathematics in order to reach the university. The board of the City Gymnasium protested against this. In 1887 the municipality debated about the admission of a girl to the gymnasium. Even though girls had been admitted elsewhere, the municipality ruled against it.

Despite this the gymnasium did not grow much. In 1900–1901 it had 40 students. Lessons in gymnastics, physics, chemistry and natural history were given in the nearby building of the HBS. This cooperation between the HBS and the gymnasium was reason for the mayor to visit The Hague and to call an emergency meeting of the council when the government wanted to move the HBS. In the end a new covered equestrian facility was built just south of the gymnasium, while the HBS got a new building just east of that new building. The open air equestrian facility in that place was moved elsewhere.

== Interwar period ==
During the interwar period the gymnasium grew slowly. In 1923 there were 85 students. In 1926 there were 89 students, of which 35 were girls. In 1929 there were 103 students, of which 34 were girls. Meanwhile, it got competition from Roman Catholic schools with segregation between the sexes. These grew much faster, even though they officially did not give access to university.

== After World War II ==
In 1972, the school moved to a location on In den Boerenmouw 14, near the St. John's Cathedral. In 1978 the school was moved to Kooikersweg, a location behind the railway station. For students and staff it felt like a banishment. The school also had to share space with a comprehensive school.

== Building ==
At the start of the schoolyear 2002–2003 a new building on the Mercator Square Mercatorplein was taken into use. Soon after the move, the number of students greatly increased. In 2006 and 2013 the buildings B and C were then added. The D building was added as a gym in 2023.

== Organization ==
The City Grammar school offers gymnasium education. Here the word gymnasium refers to the teaching done in the classical Greek "γυμνάσιον" (gymnasion), while in many other countries, it refers to the physical education in the gymnasion, leading to the meaning gym. A gymnasium offers a form of voorbereidend wetenschappelijk onderwijs (VWO), preparatory scientific education. This means that it offers the curriculum of the regular VWO (also called Atheneum) and has Latin and/or Classical Greek as an additional, compulsory part of the curriculum. The City Gymnasium is a categoraal gymnasium, meaning that the school offers no other education. In recent decades this form of gymnasium has gained more popularity with parents.

Like all schools the City Gymnasium is paid for by the state. It is public in the sense that it is open to all children, not only those of parents who favor a particular religious or other conviction. Like the English grammar school the gymnasium is selective: it bases admission on the advice given by the primary school. On 1 August 2002 City Gymnasium joined the Openbare Stichting Zelfstandige Gymnasia (OSZG) (public foundation for independent gymnasia), the authority that governs the school. Day-to-day management is done by the principal rector. There is a council called medezeggenschapsraad that represents parents, students and staff. There is also a society for parents, and one for students called LOS! (Leerlingenorganisatie Stedelijk).

== Notable former pupils ==
Very notable former pupils are:

- Desiderius Erasmus (humanist, philosopher)
- Georgius Macropedius (humanist, teacher and Latin playwright)
- Gerardus Mercator (cartographer)
- Joan Derk van der Capellen tot den Pol (patriot)

Recent former pupils:

- Joost Prinsen (actor)
- René van Dammen (audience measurement expert)
- P. F. Thomése (writer)
- Leon de Winter (writer)
- Pieter Steinz (writer)
- Maartje Goderie (hockey player)
- Ilias Bulaid (kickboxer)
