= List of Dutch Jews =

This page is a list of notable Dutch Jews, arranged by field of activity.

== Sciences ==
Name	Notability	References
Samuel Goudsmit (1902-1978)	physicist	
Hajo Meyer (1924-2014)	physicist	

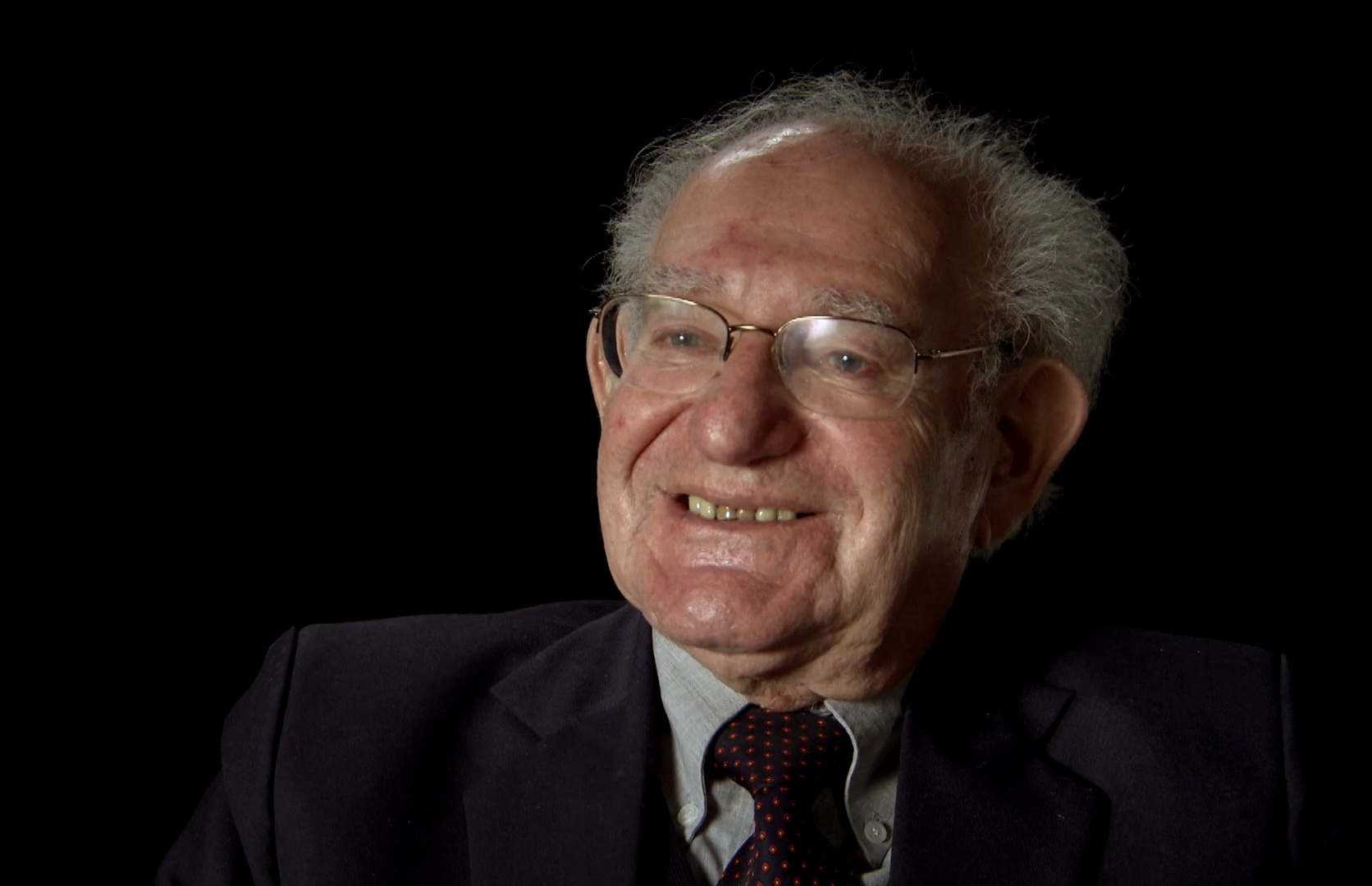
Hajo Meyer, Dutch physicist at Philips Natuurkundig Laboratorium

== Economists ==
Name	Notability	References
Arnold Heertje (1934-2020)	professor, writer, columnist	
Hendrik S. Houthakker (1924-2008)	professor	

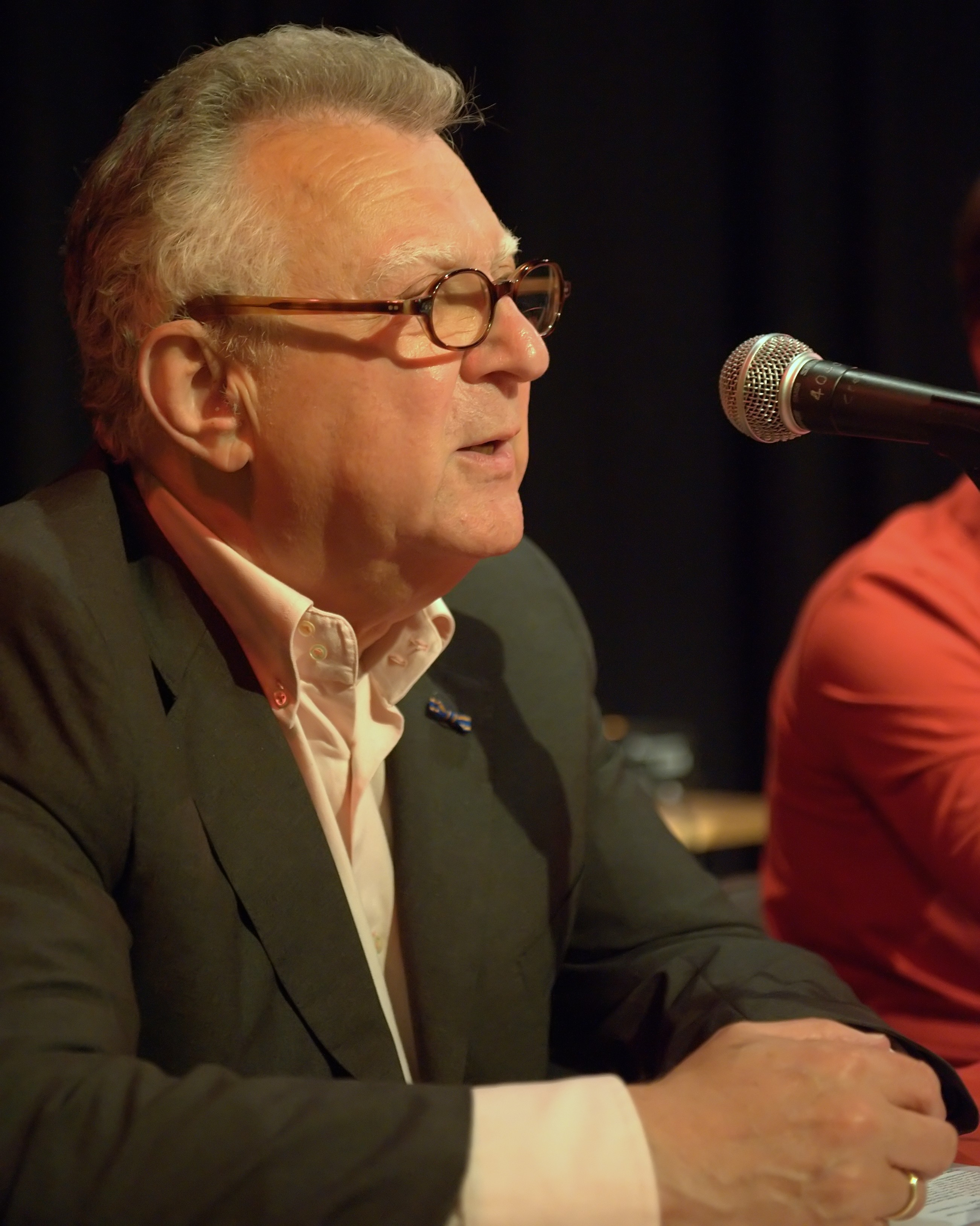
Arnold Heertje, economist, father of comedian Raoul Heertje

== Jurists ==
Name	Notability	References
Tobias Asser (1838-1913)	Nobel Peace Prize winner in 1911	
Eduard Meijers (1880-1954)	founding father of the Dutch new civil code	
Bram Moszkowicz	has a Jewish father, Max Moszkowicz	
Max Moszkowicz		

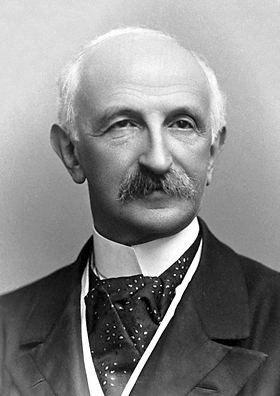
Tobias Asser, Nobel Peace Prize winner

== Mathematicians ==
Name	Notability	References
Wim Cohen (1923-2000)	mathematician	
Rehuel Lobatto (1797-1866)		
Emanuel Lodewijk Elte (1881-1943)		
Julius Wolff (1882-1945)		

== Musicians ==
Name	Notability	References
Bart Berman (born 1938)	Had a Jewish mother, pianist	
Lenny Kuhr (born 1950)	Converted into Judaism, singer	

== Actors ==
Name	Notability	References
Esther de Boer-van Rijk (1853-1937)	stage actress	
Louis Davids (1883-1939)	actor, singer, comedian and revue artist	
Caro van Eyck (1915-1979)	stage and television actress	
Lex Goudsmit (1913-1999)	stage and television actor	
Raoul Heertje (born 1963)	stand-up comedian	
Edwin de Vries (born 1950)	actor and director	
Micha Wertheim (born 1972)	stand-up comedian	

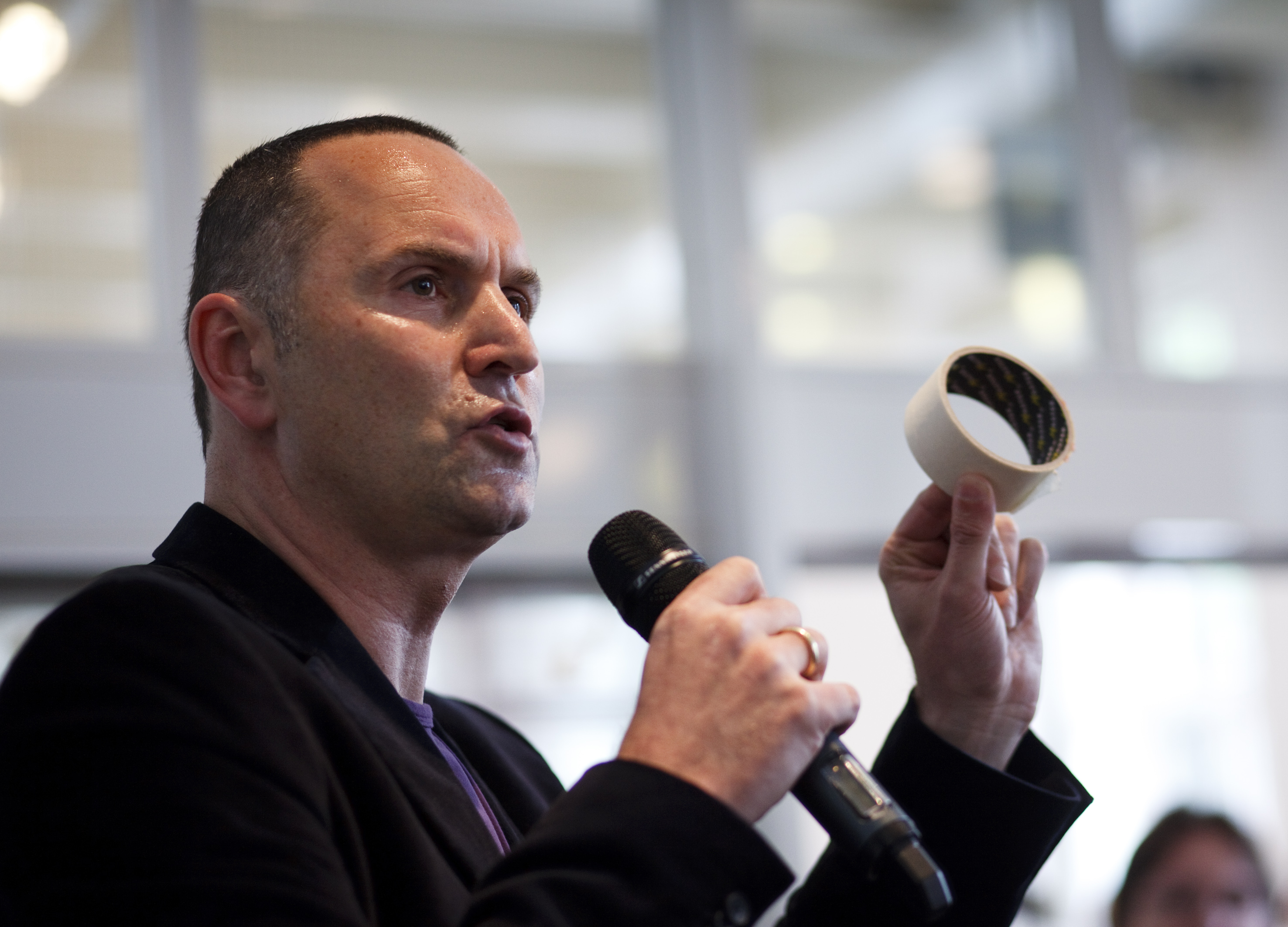
Raoul Heertje, stand-up comedian

== Visual arts ==
Name	Notability	References
Helen Berman (born 1936)		
Paul Citroen (1896-1983)		
Frank Diamand (born 1939)	documentary maker and poet	
Marianne Franken (1884-1945)		
Eduard Frankfort (1864-1920)		
Isaac Israëls (1865-1934)		
Jozef Israëls (1824-1911)		
Jesse Kluytmans (1841-????)		
David Laurent de Lara (c.1806-1876)	limner, born in Amsterdam, based in London.	
Willy Lindwer	movie / documentary director	
Joseph Mendes da Costa (1863-1939)	sculptor	
Joseph Jessurun de Mesquita (1865-1890)	photographer	
Max Bueno de Mesquita (1913-2001)		
Samuel Jessurun de Mesquita (1868-1944)	graphic artist	
Martin Monnickendam (1874-1943)		
Benjamin Prins (1860-1934)		
Mommie Schwarz (1876-1942)		
Frans Weisz (born 1938)	film director	

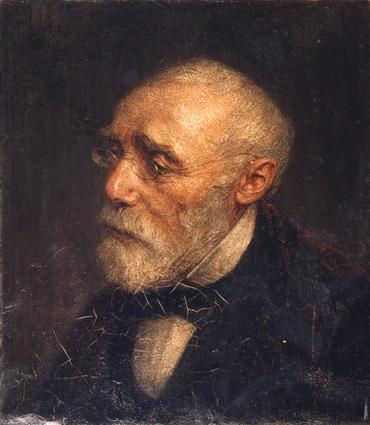
Jozef Israëls (portrait by Jan Veth) and his son Isaac Israëls are among the most famous Dutch-Jewish artists.

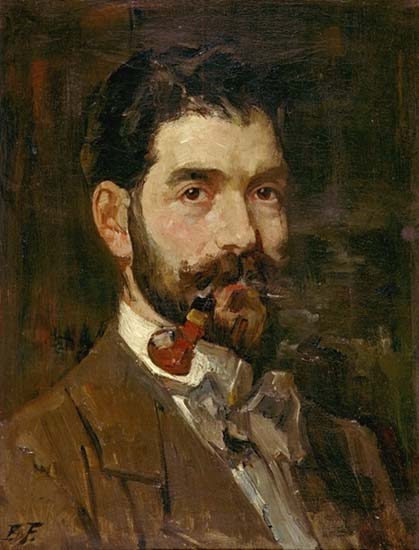
Self-portrait of Eduard Frankfort

== Politicians ==
Name	Notability	References
Lodewijk Asscher	Leader of the Labour Party • Deputy Prime Minister • Minister of Social Affairs and Employment • MP • (PvdA)	
Robbert Baruch	Member of the provincial council of South Holland, member of the government executive of the Rotterdam borough of Feijenoord (PvdA)	
Sidney J. van den Bergh	Minister of Defence • MP • (VVD)	
Job Cohen	Leader of the Labour Party • Mayor of Amsterdam • State Secretary for Justice • State Secretary for Education and Sciences • MP • (PvdA)	
Hedy d'Ancona	Minister of Welfare, Health and Culture • State Secretary for Social Affairs and Employment • MP • (PvdA)	
Onno Hoes	Mayor of Haarlemmermeer • Mayor of Maastricht • (VVD)	
Ernst Hirsch Ballin	Minister of the Interior • Minister of Justice • Minister for Netherlands Antilles and Aruba Affairs • MP • (CDA)	
Aletta Jacobs	Political and women's suffrage activist	
Jacob Kohnstamm	State Secretary for the Interior • MP • (D66)	
Arie Pais	Minister of Education and Sciences • MP • (VVD)	
Carel Polak	Minister of Justice • MP • (VVD)	
Wim Polak	Mayor of Amsterdam • State Secretary for the Interior • (PvdA)	
Max Rood	Minister of the Interior • (D66)	
Uri Rosenthal	Minister of Foreign Affairs • MP • (VVD)	
Ivo Samkalden	Minister of Justice • Minister of the Interior • Mayor of Amsterdam • MP • (PvdA)	
Eegje Schoo	Minister for Development Cooperation • MP • (VVD)	
Ed van Thijn	Minister of the Interior • Mayor of Amsterdam • MP • (PvdA)	
Jacques Wallage	Mayor of Groningen • State Secretary for Social Affairs and Employment • State Secretary for Education and Sciences • MP • (PvdA)	
Frans Weisglas	Speaker of the House of Representatives • MP • (VVD)	
Harry Wijnschenk	Leader of the Pim Fortuyn List • MP • (LPF)	

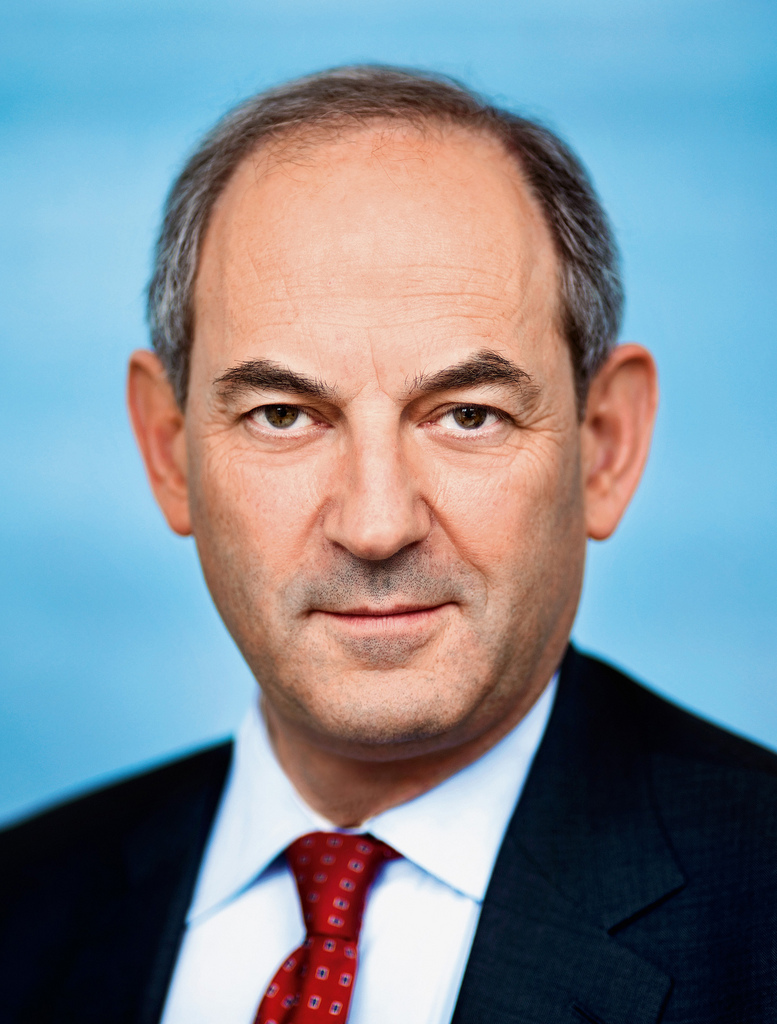
Job Cohen, politician

== Business ==
Name	Notability	References
Samuel van den Bergh (1864-1941)	co-founder of Unilever; politician	
Israël Kiek (1811-1899)	photographer	
Kokadorus Linnewiel (1867-1934)	Dutch hawker	
Abraham Icek Tuschinski (1886–1942)	cinema entrepreneur and Holocaust victim	

== Sportspeople ==
Name	Notability	References
Estella Agsteribbe	Olympic Games champion in team combined exercises and killed by the Nazis in Auschwitz	
Carina Benninga	former Dutch field hockey player with a gold medal and bronze medal from the Olympic Games	
Elka de Levie	Olympic champion in team combined exercises	
Helena Nordheim	Olympic champion in team combined exercises and killed by the Nazis in Sobibór	
Tom Okker	tennis player who won the 1973 French Open Men's Doubles, 1976 US Open men's doubles, highest world ranking #3 in singles, and #1 in doubles	
Anna Polak	Olympic champion in team combined exercises; killed by the Nazis in Sobibór	
Daniël de Ridder (born 1984)	Celta de Vigo forward winger/attacking midfielder (Wigan Athletic & U21 national team)	
Jonathan Rouschop Dror	football player of Eijsden 5	
Aryeh "Arie" Selinger	United States and Dutch volleyball player and coach	
Avital Selinger	Volleyball player with a silver medal from the Olympic Games	
Judijke Simons	Olympic champion in team combined exercises; killed by the Nazis in Sobibór	
Sjaak Swart	Dutch international footballer who played for AFC Ajax from 1956 to 1973	

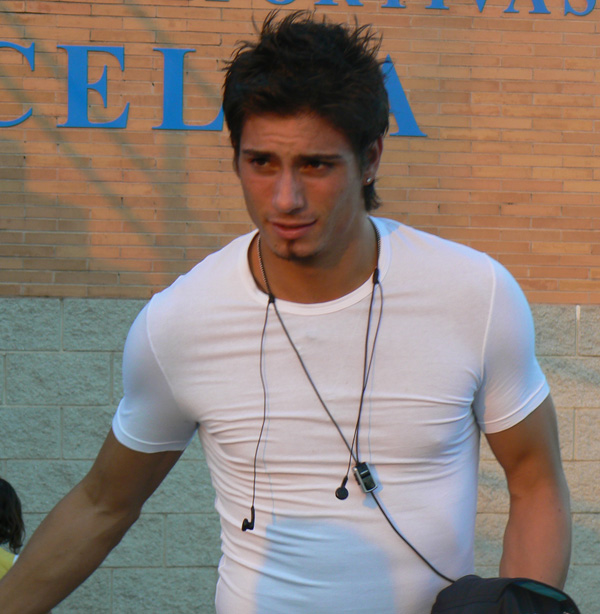
Daniël de Ridder, Israeli-Dutch soccer player

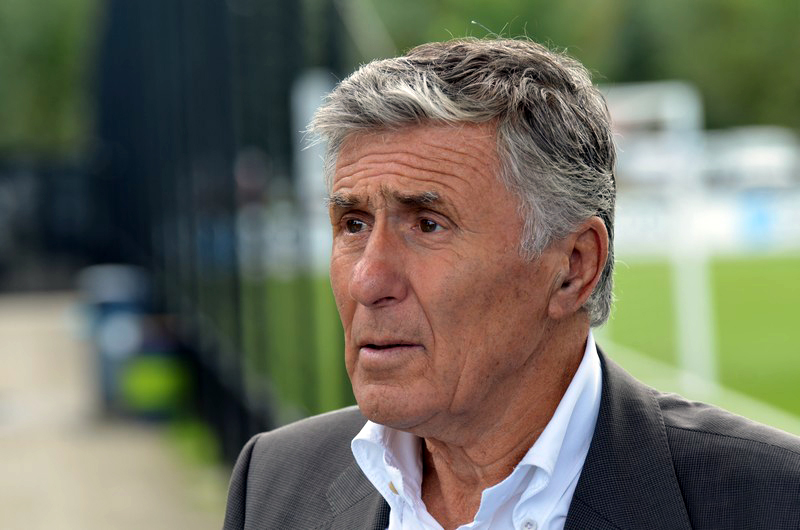
Sjaak Swart, Dutch footballer

== Writers ==
Name	Notability	References
Manja Croiset	author and poet	
Anne Frank	author of Diary of a Young Girl	
Etty Hillesum	author of Etty Hillesum: An Interrupted Life the Diaries, 1941–1943 and Letters from Westerbork	
Xaviera Hollander	author	
Gideon Levy (born 1970)	Dutch journalist	
Minny Mock-Degen (1945-2020)	Dutch anthropologist, writer, and publisher	
Ida Simons (1911-1960)	pianist and writer	
Jaap Nunes Vaz (1906-1943)	co-founder of Het Parool and member of the Dutch Resistance	
Baruch Spinoza	Jewish philosopher	
Leon de Winter	author	

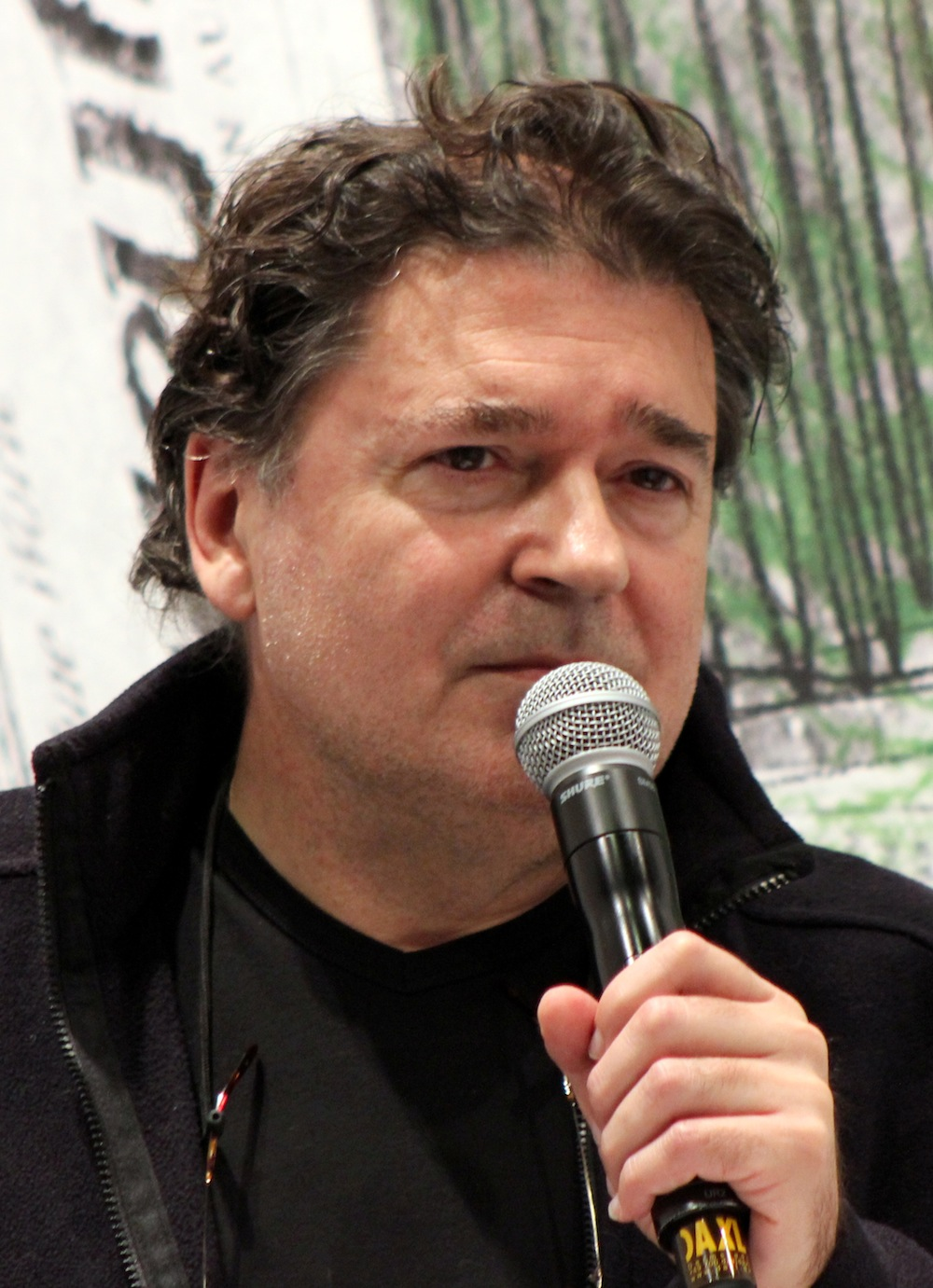
Leon de Winter, writer

== Other ==
- Jessica Durlacher (born 1961), columnist and novelist
- Ischa Meijer (1943-1995), journalist, television presenter, actor, and author
- Natascha van Weezel (born 1986), author and film maker
- Ronit Palache (born 1984), author and journalist
- Marcel Möring (born 1957), author
- Jaïr Stranders (born 1978), artistic leader of Theater Na de Dam
- Hans Weijel (born 1952), vice-chairman of Centraal Joods Overleg
- Solomonica de Winter (born 1997), writer and internet personality

== See also ==
- History of the Jews in the Netherlands
- List of Dutch Israelis
- List of West European Jews
