= String Quartet No. 5 (Beethoven) =

String Quartet
- No. 5
- Early string quartet by Ludwig van Beethoven
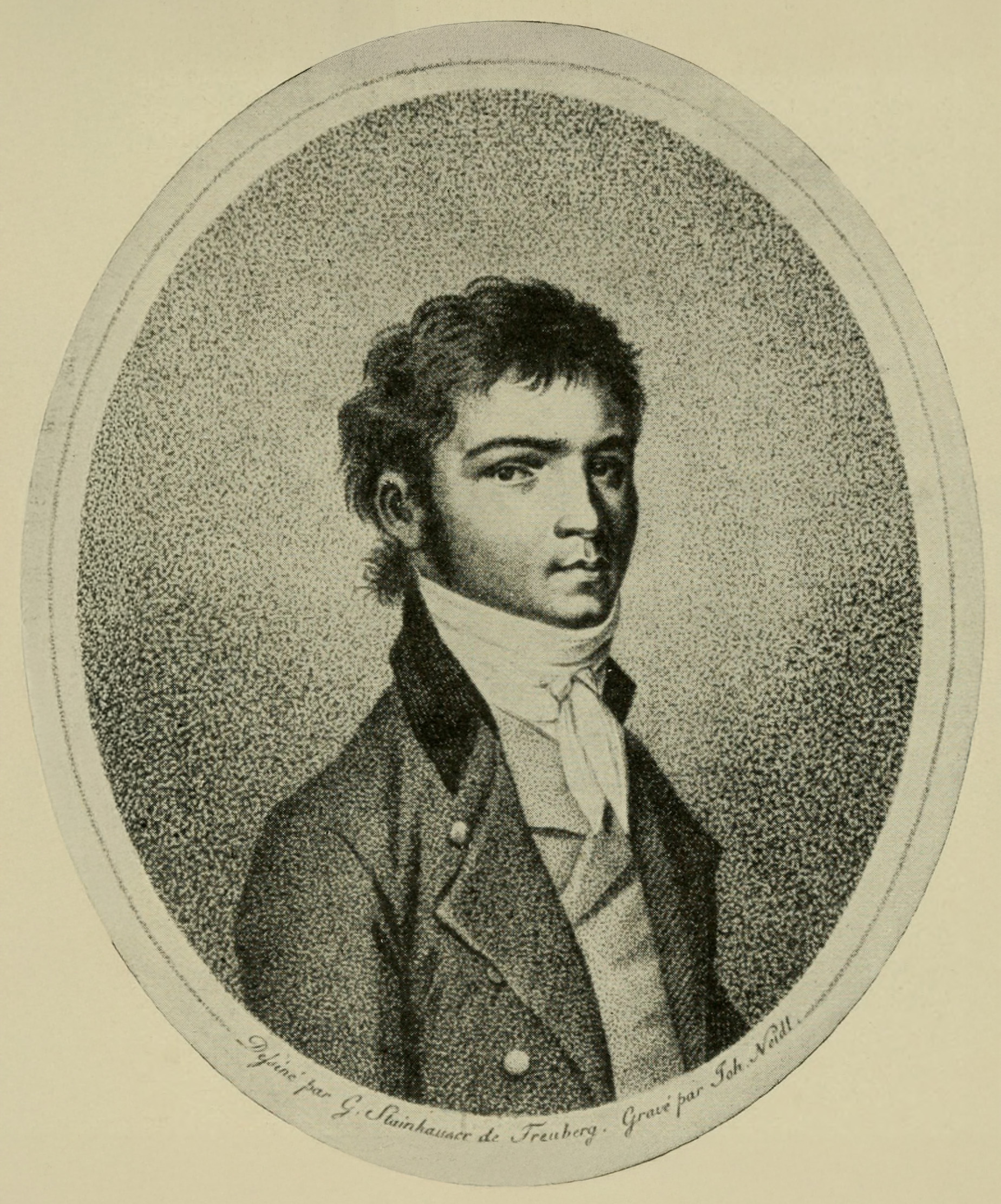
- Ludwig van Beethoven, c. 1796
- Key: A major
- Opus: 18, No. 5
- Composed: 1798–1800
- Dedication: Joseph Franz von Lobkowitz
- Published: 1801
- Movements: Four

The String Quartet No. 5 in A major, Op. 18, No. 5, was written between 1798 and 1800 by Ludwig van Beethoven and published in 1801, and dedicated to Joseph Franz von Lobkowitz. Beethoven modeled this quartet directly on Mozart's quartet in the same key, K. 464.

== Movements ==
Part of Menuetto from String Quartet No. 5, performed in 1938 by the Hague String Quartet, consisting of Sam Swaap, Adolf Poth, Jean Devert and Charles van Isterdael

The string quartet consists of four movements:

1. Allegro (A major)
2. Menuetto - Trio (A major)
3. Andante cantabile (Theme with variations, D major)
4. Allegro assai (A major)
