= Goudstikker =

Goudstikker (Dutch for "Gold Stitcher", in German Goldstücker) is the name of a Dutch Jewish family. Notable Goudstikkers include:

- Jacques Goudstikker (1897–1940), art dealer
- Sophia Goudstikker (1865–1924), photographer and feminist pioneer

== See also ==
- Theodor Goldstücker (1821–1872), scholar of Sanskrit
- List of Dutch Jews
