= Heijermans =

Heijermans is a surname. Notable people with this surname include:

- Marie Heijermans (1859–1937), Dutch painter
- Herman Heijermans (1864–1924), Dutch writer
- Hubertine Heijermans (1936–2022), Dutch visual artist
