= Manja Croiset =

Dutch writer (1946–2022)

- Born: July 5, 1946 Amsterdam
- Died: 2022 (aged 75–76) Hoogland (Amersfoort)
- Occupation: Poet, writer, recitation artist
- Genre: Poetry, philosophical, second-generation Shoah victim literature, psychiatric institution experiences
- Notable awards: Elikser award (2009)

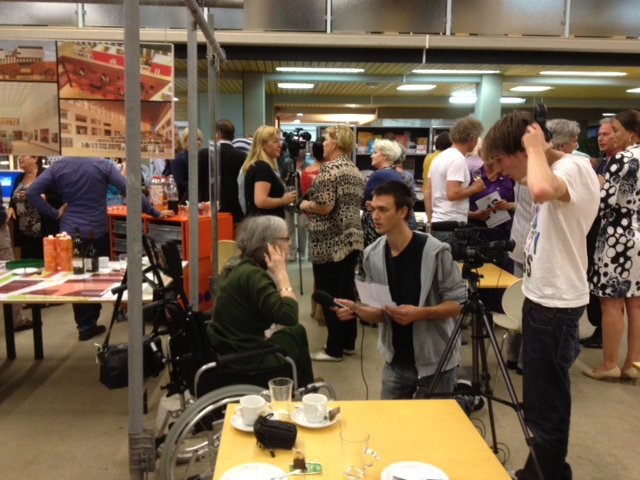
Interviewing M. Croiset during the opening of library store, 12, 09, 2012

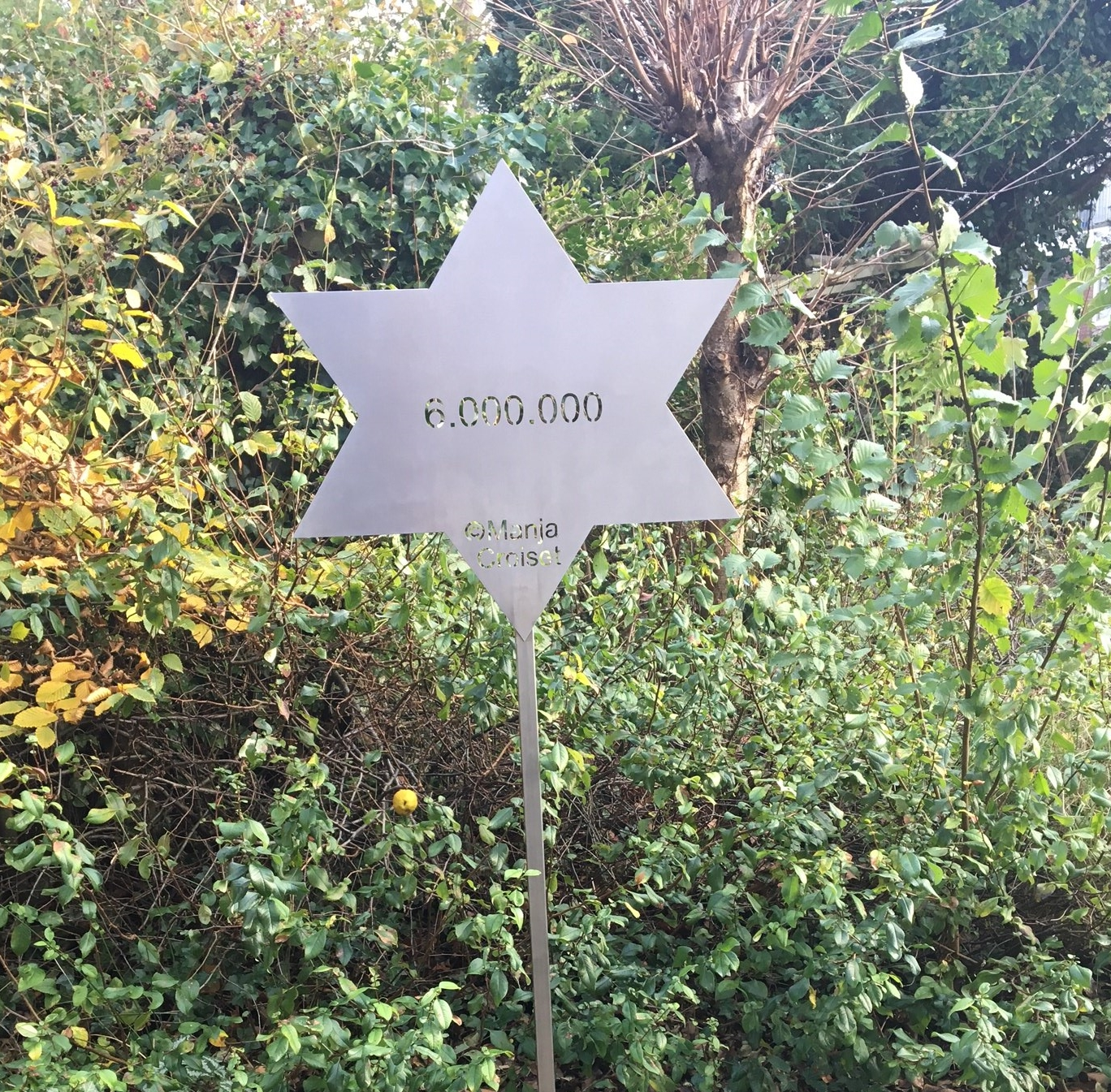
Art based on the Shoah by Manja Croiset

Manja Croiset (5 July 1946, Amsterdam – January 2022, Hoogland (Amersfoort)) is a Dutch poet, writer and recitation artist.

== Biography ==
Croiset was born on 5 July 1946, in Amsterdam. She is a second generation Shoah victim, the daughter of Shoah survivors, and youngest of three daughters. The family members of her mother, Paula Kool (March 11, 1918 – May 11, 2012), were murdered in The Holocaust. Her father, Odo Croiset (April 24, 1915 – November 18, 2011), son of Hijman Croiset, survived several Nazi concentration camps because of illegal printing practices including printing of Het Parool. Manja is also a cousin of Hans Croiset and Jules Croiset.

=== Early life and education ===
After elementary school Manja attended Barlaeus Gymnasium, but was admitted into a psychiatric hospital at an early age. She worked at the Leidsch Dagblad, a Dutch newspaper, for nine years.

=== Writing career ===
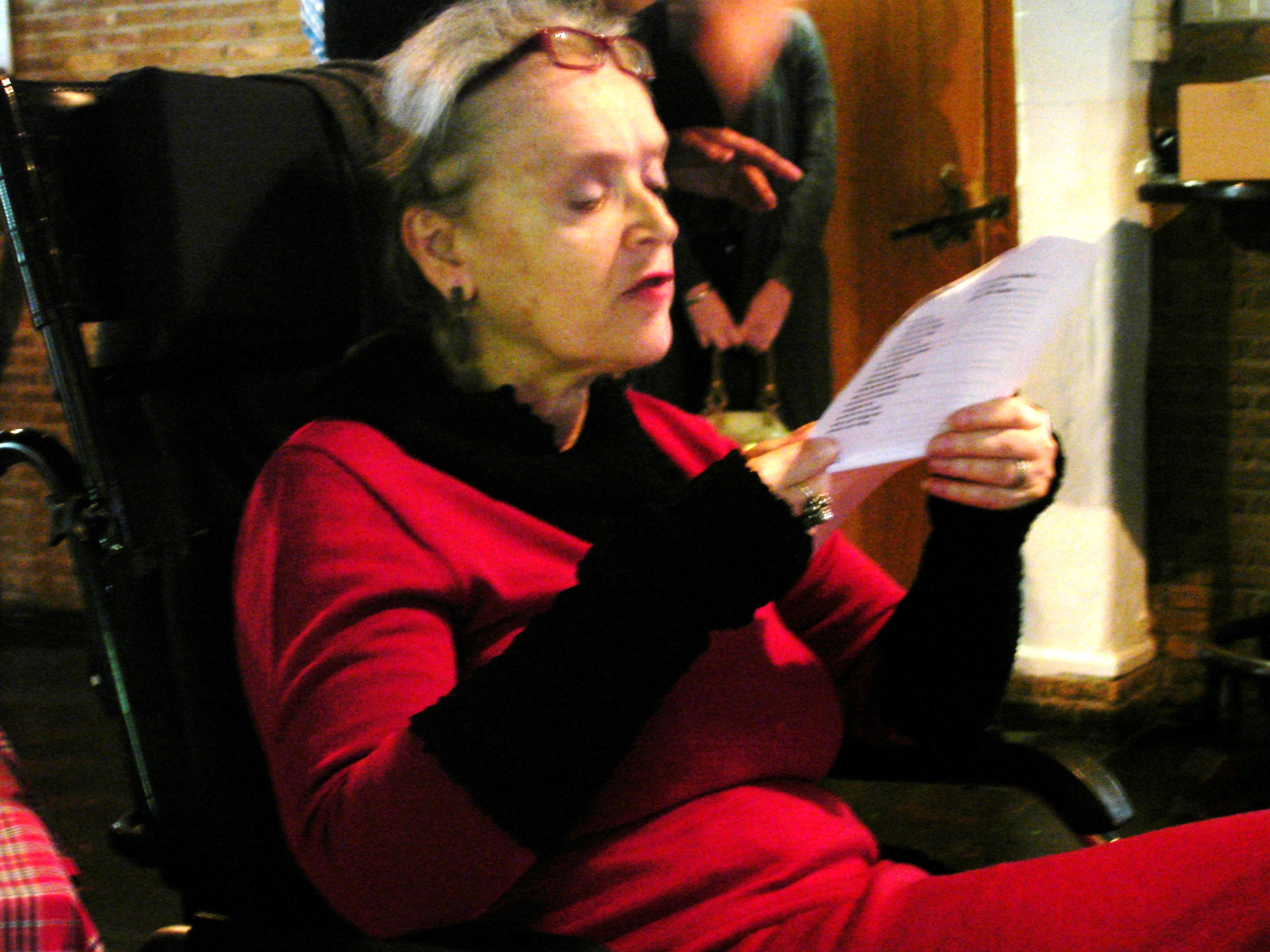
Elikser Publisher Party, September 11, 2009

Croiset started her career later in life, but wrote numerous books in a short period. Her work has some philosophical aspect. She also creates 'Manjaphorisms and other puns. The reoccurring subject lines in her books are about being a second generation Shoah victim and her life in the many different psychiatric institutions.

In 2009 she received the Elikser award and certificate from her publisher. This was the first time the prize was awarded.

== Bibliography ==
- 1956: Pietje en Sjaantje Deel I. Jeugdwerk met eigen gemaakte tekeningen (no ISBN available)
- 1956: Mier en Kabouter Deel II. Jeugdwerk met eigen gemaakte tekeningen
- 2006: Dissonante Symfonie. Verzameld werk, uitgeverij Gopher. ISBN 9789051793260
- 2007: Mijn leven achter onzichtbare tralies, autobiography, ISBN 978-90-5179-511-0
- 2007: Uit de spelonken van mijn ziel, gedichten, ISBN 9789051795127
- 2007: Out of the caves from my soul / my life a kind of a prison, ISBN 9789051795301
- 2008: Croisade van een Croiset: elke droom een nachtmerrie, ISBN 978-90-8954-020-1, uitgeverij Elikser
- 2008: Mijn leven achter onzichtbare tralies, heruitgave, ISBN 978-90-8954-059-1. Er zijn ook 2 cd's van het boek. Dit egodocument beschrijft dezelfde wereld als de debuutroman Blauwe Maandagen van Arnon Grunberg, namelijk de problematiek van de Joodse tweede generatie
- 2009: Toeschouwer of deelnemer: filosoof of zonderling, gedichten/gedachten. bloemlezing, ISBN 978-90-8954-080-5
- 2009: Knipoog in de duisternis, ISBN 978-90-8954-091-1
- 2011: Een hart van bloedkoraal, ISBN 9789089541512, een vervolg op de autobiografie Mijn leven achter onzichtbare tralies
- 2011: Traan met een kwinkslag, bestaande uit deze titel, gedichten of gedachten, bedelares voor eeuwig, de tijdloze tijd, borrelnootjes, Manjaforismen en Manjafiques, ISBN 978 90 8954 349 3
- 2012: Zieleroerselen van een getormenteerd mens, naar het gelijknamige weblog. Subtitel: Living on my isle of fear and loneliness. ISBN 978-90-8954-4551
- 2012: Wie is de vrouw in de spiegel... bloemlezing of rouwkrans, ISBN 9789089544766
- 2013: MC (de alleszeggende stilte/eenzame wolf), ISBN 9789089545473. Inclusief het boekje AGONIE
- 2013: Spelen met taal. Bestaande uit: Eigen-wijsheden, Eigen-aardigheden, Manja-fiques, Ver-zin-sels. Manj-aforismen ISBN 9789402100099
- 2014: Over de Shoah die nooit voorbij gaat, (familie)historie, ISBN 9789402111903
- 2014: Spelen met taal, Grotere uitgave ISBN 9789402117400
- 2014: WOORDKUNSTENAAR niet bij letters alleen. Met eigen gemaakte illustraties. ISBN 9789402122138
- 2014: Over de Shoah die nooit voorbij gaat, (familie)historie, ISBN 9789402118339
- 2014: Fotoboek over dans, van de schoonheid en de troost naar de VPRO serie. ISBN 9789402116878
- 2015: Over de Shoah die nooit voorbij gaat, (familie)historie,ISBN 9789402125078
- 2015: Over de Shoah die nooit voorbij gaat, (familie)historie,ISBN 9789402125061
- 2015: Manja en Klinieken of de Grote Miskenning, met foto's ISBN 9789402132472
- 2015: AUTHENTIEKE VERTELLINGEN door generaties heen, met foto's, Eigen beheer.
- 2015: Manja en Klinieken of de grote Miskenning, hardcover, met foto's ISBN 9789402136579
- 2015: My life a kind of prison with a wink in the darkness, poems and prose together her autobiography in English. A resume from the authors Dutch books., with illustrations ISBN 9789402137835
- 2015: Sprookje. Heruitgave 1956 Pietje Mier en Sjaantje Kabouter. Hardcover Eigen beheer
- 2015: RariteitenkabineT van manja croiseT. Met veel illustraties. Eigen beheer.

== Documentary ==
Dutch documentary maker Willy Lindwer made a 60-minute documentary about Manja Croiset's life, Manja – A Life Behind Invisible Bars. The movie made its debut in 2013 at the International Documentary Film Festival Amsterdam. After its debut, it was translated into English and released in the United States. Showed on Nationaal Holocaust Museum in Amsterdam April 2018 and is also in the collection of Yad Vashem included the autobiography with a Wink in the darkness. Introduced by a speech from the author.

== See also ==
- List of Dutch Jews
