= Israel–Netherlands relations =

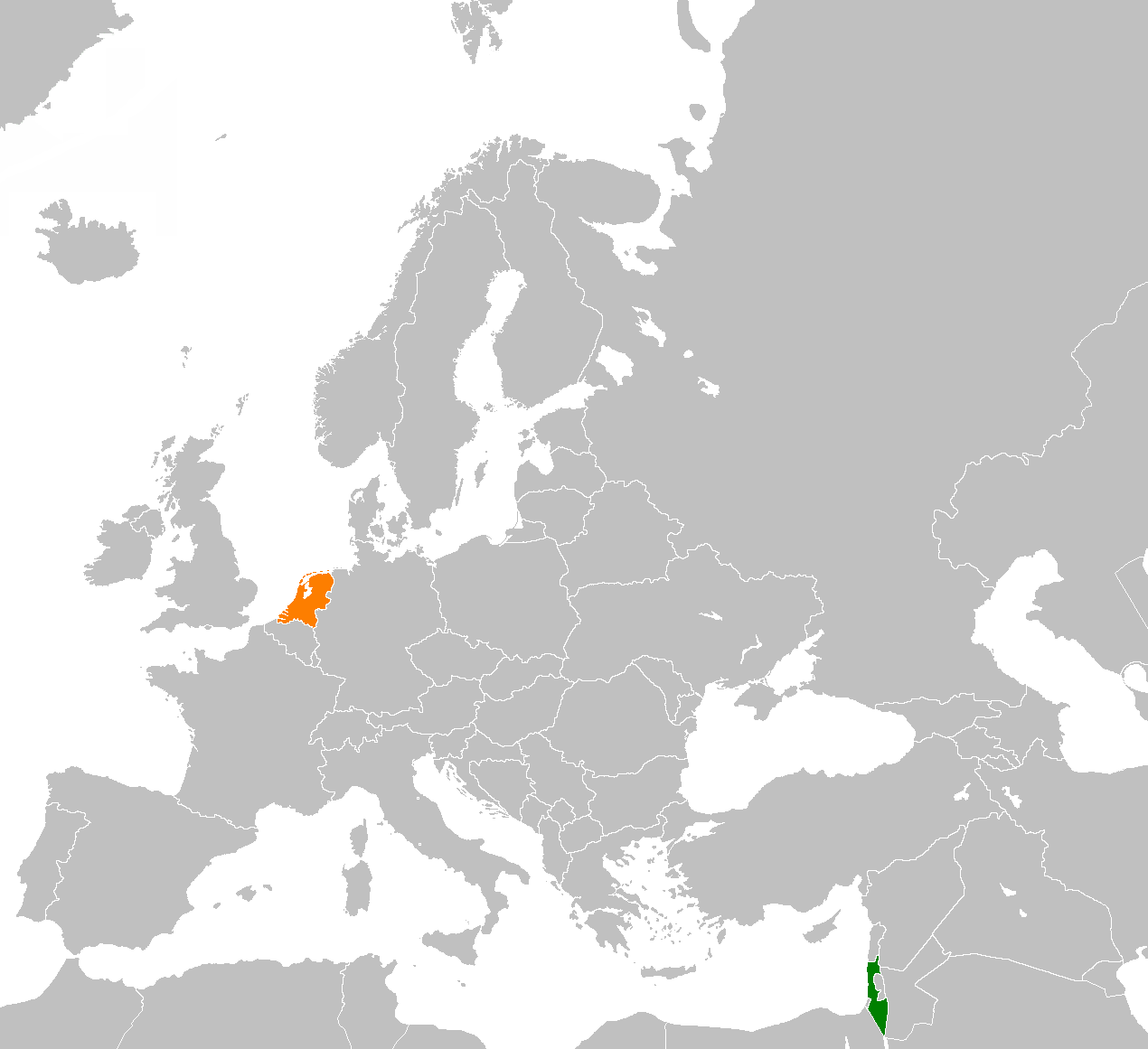
- Israel: Netherlands

The Kingdom of the Netherlands and state of Israel have had diplomatic relations since 1949. The Netherlands has an embassy in Ramat Gan, an information office in Jerusalem and two honorary consulates in Eilat and Haifa. Israel has an embassy in The Hague. Both countries are full members of the Union for the Mediterranean.

Relations have historically been friendly, but have degraded somewhat since October 2023. The Netherlands' role as home to various EU institutions is a factor in the two nations' relationship.

== History ==
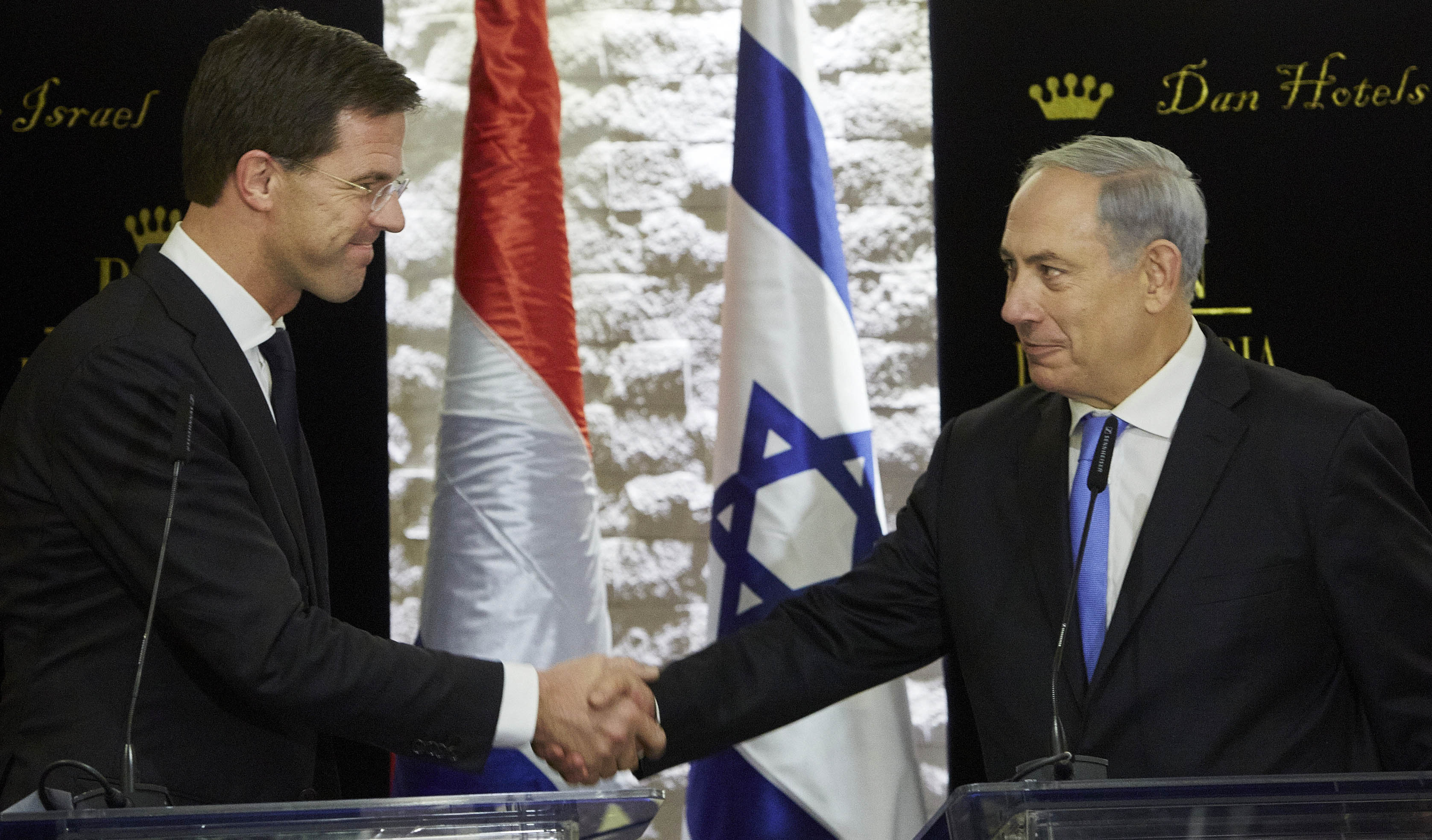
Dutch Prime Minister Mark Rutte and Israeli Prime Minister Benyamin Netanyahu, 2013

=== Yishuv ===
King Willem-Alexander of the Netherlands commemorated the long-lasting bonding between the Netherlands and the re-establishment of a Jewish homeland in Israel (President Shimon Peres' dinner 2013): “It was a Dutch banker from The Hague, Jacobus Kann, who made possible the purchase of the land on which the first modern districts of Tel Aviv were built, more than 100 years ago.” Jacobus Henricus Kann (1872–1944) was a Jewish Dutch banker and owner of the private bank NV Bankierskantoor van Lissa & Kann (ABN AMRO Bank), among his clientele were members of the Dutch royal family, a founder of Bank Otzar Hityashvut Hayehudim and Bank Anglo Palestine (Bank Leumi), and an affluent investor in companies as the Palestine Potash Limited (Dead Sea Works) and Frutarom. Kann sponsored many of Hertzel activities and the zionist conferences and purchased the land for Achuzat Bait- the seed of Tel-Aviv. Kann arrived to Jerusalem for a third time in 1924 with his family and was nominated as the first Consul of the Netherlands in Jerusalem (1924–27). Kann died on 7 October 1944, in the Theresienstadt concentration camp.

In 1947, the Netherlands voted in favor of the United Nations Partition Plan for Palestine. Both countries established diplomatic relations in 1949.

=== 1948–1999 ===
The Netherlands was initially among the most supportive countries of Israel in Europe. It was one of the few countries to establish an embassy in Jerusalem, whereas most countries preferred placing their embassies in the Tel Aviv area until the final status of Jerusalem was resolved. Following the Six-Day War, the Dutch people raised about $4.2 million for Israel in donations. After the Soviet Union cut off diplomatic relations with Israel due to the Six-Day War, the Dutch Embassy in Moscow established an Israel interests' section which represented Israel in the Soviet Union until diplomatic relations were reestablished in January 1991. In 1973, during the Yom Kippur War, the Netherlands was one of only two European countries (the other being Portugal) that allowed American aircraft ferrying military equipment to Israel as part of Operation Nickel Grass to use its airbases. The Netherlands also supplied Israel with military equipment during the war, primarily engines, spare parts, and shells for its British-built Centurion tanks after the British government had imposed an arms embargo on Israel and thus cut off Israel's original source for this material, but also parts and munitions for light AMX tanks, artillery ammunition, and aircraft bombs. A number of Dutch truck drivers worked in Israel during the war to replace Israeli truck drivers who had been called up for military service.

In 1980, following the Jerusalem Law and a UN Resolution asking member states to withdraw their Jerusalem embassies in response, the Dutch government moved its embassy from Jerusalem. Dutch forces were deployed as part of the UNIFIL peacekeeping force in Lebanon, and during the 1982 Lebanon War, a unit of Dutch peacekeepers was one of the few UNIFIL units that attempted to obstruct the Israeli advance. The Dutch soldiers put up obstacles that damaged two Israeli tanks, but the Israeli armored column ultimately forced its way through their position.

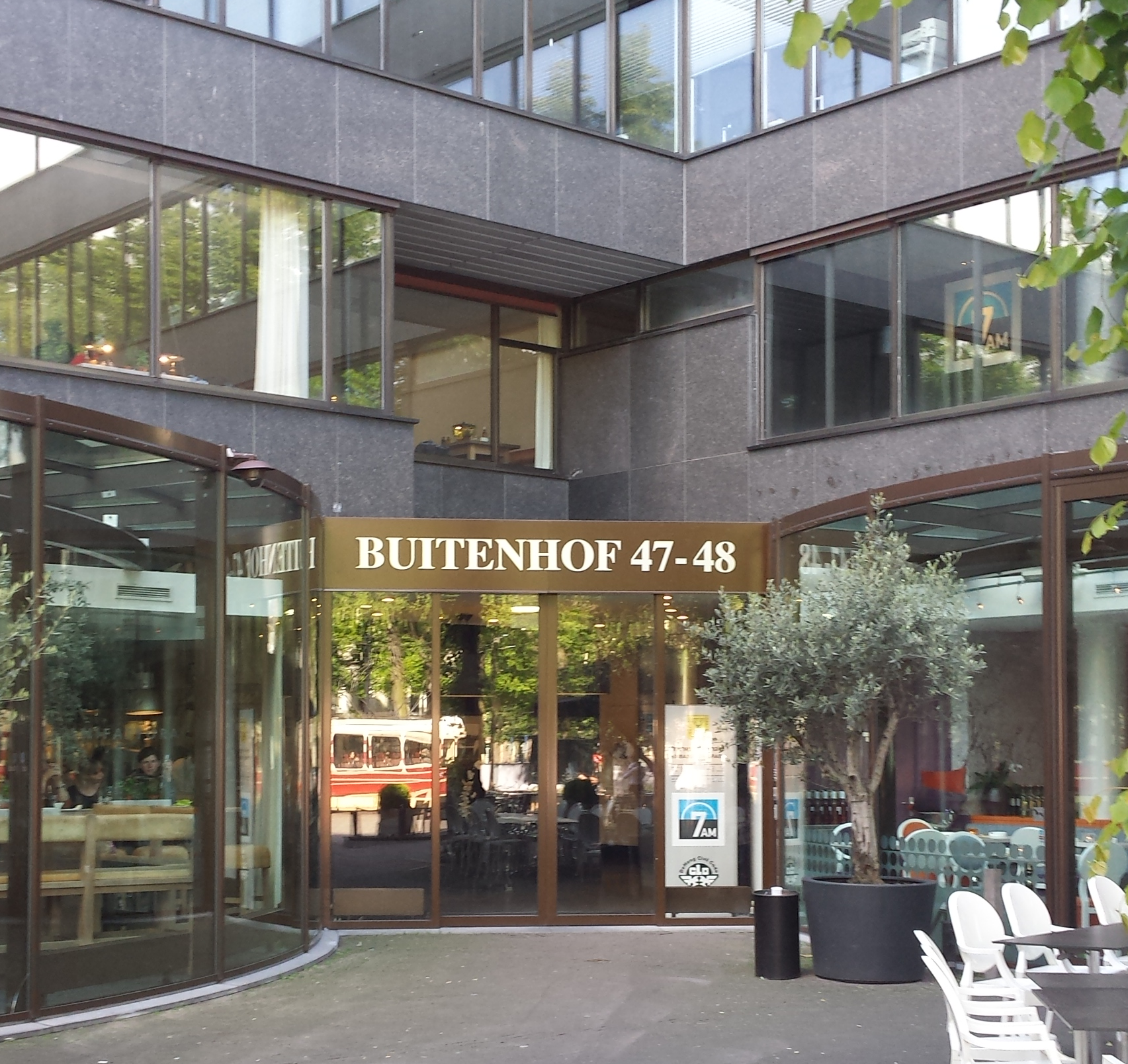
The Embassy of Israel in the Netherlands is located in this building in The Hague. (May 2014)

During the Gulf War in 1991, Iraq launched Scud missile attacks against Israel in the hopes of provoking an Israeli counterattack and thus rupturing the Allied Coalition, which included Arab countries. Israel agreed not to attack Iraq in exchange for protection, and Coalition Patriot missile batteries were deployed in Israel to counter the Scud attacks. The Royal Netherlands Air Force deployed a patriot missile squadron to Israel and Turkey. The Dutch Defense Ministry later confirmed that the Patriot missiles had been largely ineffective, but the psychological value was high.

=== 21st century ===
After the Israeli invasion of the Gaza Strip, a court in the Netherlands ordered the government to freeze all exports of F-35 fighter jets that Israel uses to bomb the Gaza Strip. This ruling is the result of a complaint against the government by Dutch humanitarian organizations Oxfam Novib, PAX Netherlands Peace Movement Foundation and The Rights Forum.

On 15 June 2025, an estimated 100,000 to 150,000 took part in a protest in The Hague that called on the Dutch government to take firmer steps against Israel's actions in the war; that protest was the largest in the Netherlands in two decades.

On 19 June 2025, during the Israeli-Iran War the Dutch embassy in Ramar Gan was hit by an Iranian missile causing damage but no injuries.

In July 2025, for the first time, the Netherlands listed Israel as a foreign threat to the country's national security, citing alleged disinformation campaigns threatening the lives of Dutch citizens during the riots by Maccabi Tel Aviv fans in November 2024. According to a report by the National Coordinator for Security and Counterterrorism (NCTV), it says that Israel attempted to influence public opinion and politics in the Netherlands by circulating documents, which contained "unusual and unwanted personal details" about Dutch citizens, to Dutch journalists and politicians. NCTV also voiced concerns that Israel and the United States constantly threatened the International Criminal Court, which could disrupt the court's work. That same month, the Netherlands banned Finance Minister, Bezalel Smotrich and Minister of National Security, Itamar Ben-Gvir from entering the country, labelling them persona non grata for their calls for ethnic cleansing in Gaza. The government also recalled the Dutch ambassador to Israel, Marriët Schuurman.

On 22 August 2025, Dutch foreign minister Caspar Veldkamp resigned from the caretaker Schoof cabinet and his New Social Contract left the governing coalition after failing to secure sanctions against Israel.

On 25 August 2026, Israeli Foreign Minister Gideon Sa'ar announced that two Dutch officials would be expelled from the US-backed Gaza Ceasefire Coordination Center in response to the Dutch government's anti-Israeli actions, including a ban on imports of goods from illegal Israeli settlements. The ban on goods included all the Druze towns and the Alawite town of Ghajar in the Golan Heights, as well as the Catholic Latrun Monastery. On 27 September , Israel notified Dutch diplomats serving in Ramallah that the diplomatic privileges granted by Israel would be terminated in seven days, in retaliation for the bans that took effect a few days prior. Minister Sa'ar said "if the Netherlands wishes to continue representing its interests with the Palestinians, it may do so from Palestinian Authority territory, rather than from the territory of the State of Israel". He also accused the Dutch government of failing to address the rise of antisemitism in the country.

== Public opinion ==
According to a 2025 Pew Research Center survey, 19% of people in the Netherlands had a favorable view of Israel, while 78% had an unfavorable view; 19% had confidence in Israeli Prime Minister Benjamin Netanyahu, while 78% did not.

== Resident diplomatic missions ==
- Israel has an embassy in The Hague.
- the Netherlands has an embassy in Ramat Gan.
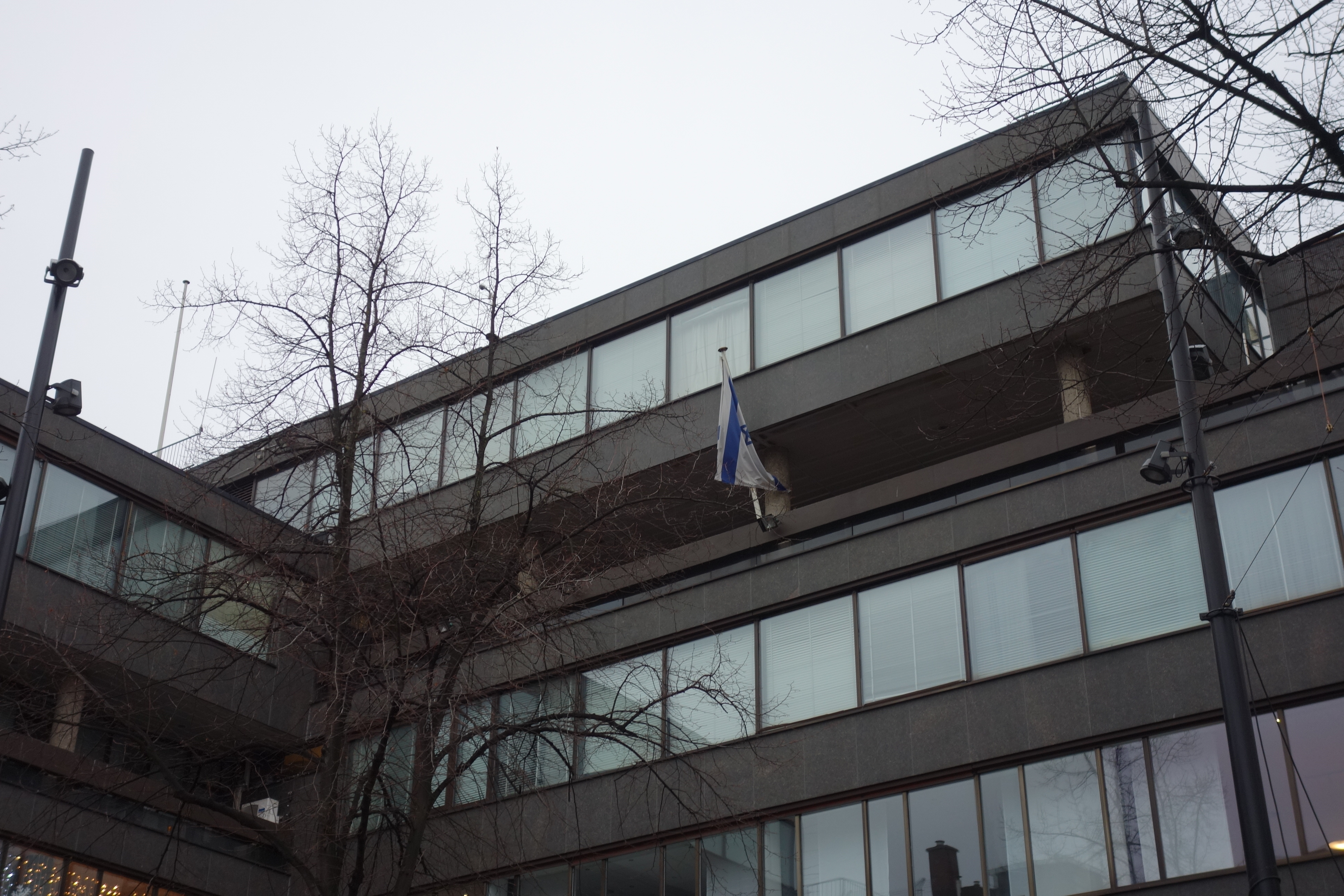
Embassy of Israel in The Hague

== See also ==
- Foreign relations of Israel
- Foreign relations of the Netherlands
- Netherlands–Palestine relations
- History of the Jews in the Netherlands
- Dutch people in Israel
