= Ida Simons =

Concert pianist Ida Rosenheimer

Ida Simons (née Ida Rosenheimer; 11 March 1911, Antwerp – 27 June 1960, The Hague) was a Belgian-born Dutch concert pianist and writer, best known for her novel A Foolish Virgin.

== Life ==
Ida Rosenheimer was born in Antwerp in a Jewish family. She grew up in Scheveningen. Her father Moritz Rosenheimer was a German-born commercial agent, while her mother, Constance Fight, was a Dutchwoman born in England, and who preferred to speak English with the family. Rosenheimer grew up speaking Yiddish, Dutch, German and English.

In 1933, she married David Simons, with whom she had a son.

Trained in classical piano under Paul Frenkel in Holland, Jan Smeterlin in London and Paul Loyonnet in Paris, she established herself as a concert pianist under her maiden name. Her debut was in Antwerp's Cercle Musical Juif. Soon she was a soloist with the main ensembles in the Netherlands, including the Concertgebouw orchestra.

When the Germans occupied the Netherlands during the Second World War, she was banned from performing. Along with her family, she was sent to Westerbork transit camp, where she played for the inmates in a series of undercover performances. In 1944, they were moved to the Terezin death camp.

In 1945, Heinrich Himmler swapped several hundred interned Jewish people for munitions. Simons and her family were some of the fortunate ones. They were allowed to go to Switzerland. After the war, they returned to the Netherlands.

Post-war, Simons' first musical performance was with Sam Swaap. She undertook a musical tour of the United States, but, physically weakened by her wartime experiences, decided to give up her musical career. She published a collection of poems Wrange oogst in 1946, and short stories Slijk en sterren in 1956 under the name of Clara Serena van Berchem. These were not publicised widely in the press.

In 1959, under the name Ida Simons, she published Een dwaze maagd (A Foolish Virgin), a semi-autobiographical novel, which became a bestseller. Her wit and delicate cynicism were praised.

Though she was known to be in poor health, her death on 27 June 1960 was unexpected. She was buried at the Jewish cemetery on the Oude Scheveningseweg. Posthumously, her novel Als water in de woestijn appeared in 1961.

== Selected works ==
=== Poetry ===
- Clara Serena van Berchem (1946). Wrange oogst. The Hague.
- "Fantaisie-Inpromptu". Ter herinnering aan Ida Simons-Rosenheimer. The Hague. 1960.

=== Prose ===
- Ida Simons (1956). Slijk en sterren: twee novellen. The Hague.
- Ida Simons (1959). Een dwaze maagd [A Foolish Virgin]. Translated by Liz Waters. Amsterdam: Uitgeverej Cossee. (English translation published by Maclehose in 2016)
- Ida Simons (1961). Als water in de woestijn. Fragmenten en verhalen. The Hague.
