= Dutch people in Israel =

Dutch people in Israel Nederlanders in Israël
Languages
- Dutch

Religion
- Mostly Protestantism, Roman Catholicism, Judaism

Dutch people in Israel (Dutch: Nederlanders in Israël) include Israeli citizens or residents who were born in the Netherlands or are of Dutch descent.

== List of Dutch Israelis ==
=== Arts ===
- Helen Berman - painter (Dutch-born)
- Hannah Yakin - painter (Dutch-born)

=== Business ===
- Dov Frohman - director-general of Intel Israel, inventor of the EPROM (Dutch-born)

=== Civil service ===
- Ya'akov Arnon - director-general of the Israeli ministry of Finance (Dutch-born)

=== Music ===
- Keren Ann - recording artist, singer-songwriter and producer
- Carmit Bachar - singer (American-born, of mixed Dutch-Israeli descent, with some Indonesian, Jewish, and Chinese roots)
- Bart Berman - pianist and composer (Dutch-born)
- Lenny Kuhr - singer-songwriter (Dutch-born)

=== Politics ===
- Ophir Pines-Paz - Knesset member and former cabinet minister (was a citizen of the Netherlands; Dutch-born father)

=== Science ===
- Martin van Creveld - military historian
- Chaim Elata - professor emeritus of mechanical engineering and President of Ben-Gurion University of the Negev, and Chairman of the Israel Public Utility Authority for Electricity
- Manfred Gerstenfeld - political scientist

=== Sports ===
- Daniël de Ridder - soccer player
- Levie Van Ouwerkerk - soccer player

=== Theatre ===
- Nissan Nativ - Israeli actor and theater educator (fled Germany to Amsterdam, then made aliyah)

== See also ==
- Israel–Netherlands relations
- Dutch diaspora
- Ethnic groups in Israel
- List of Dutch Jews
- History of the Jews in the Netherlands
