= Barlaeus Gymnasium =

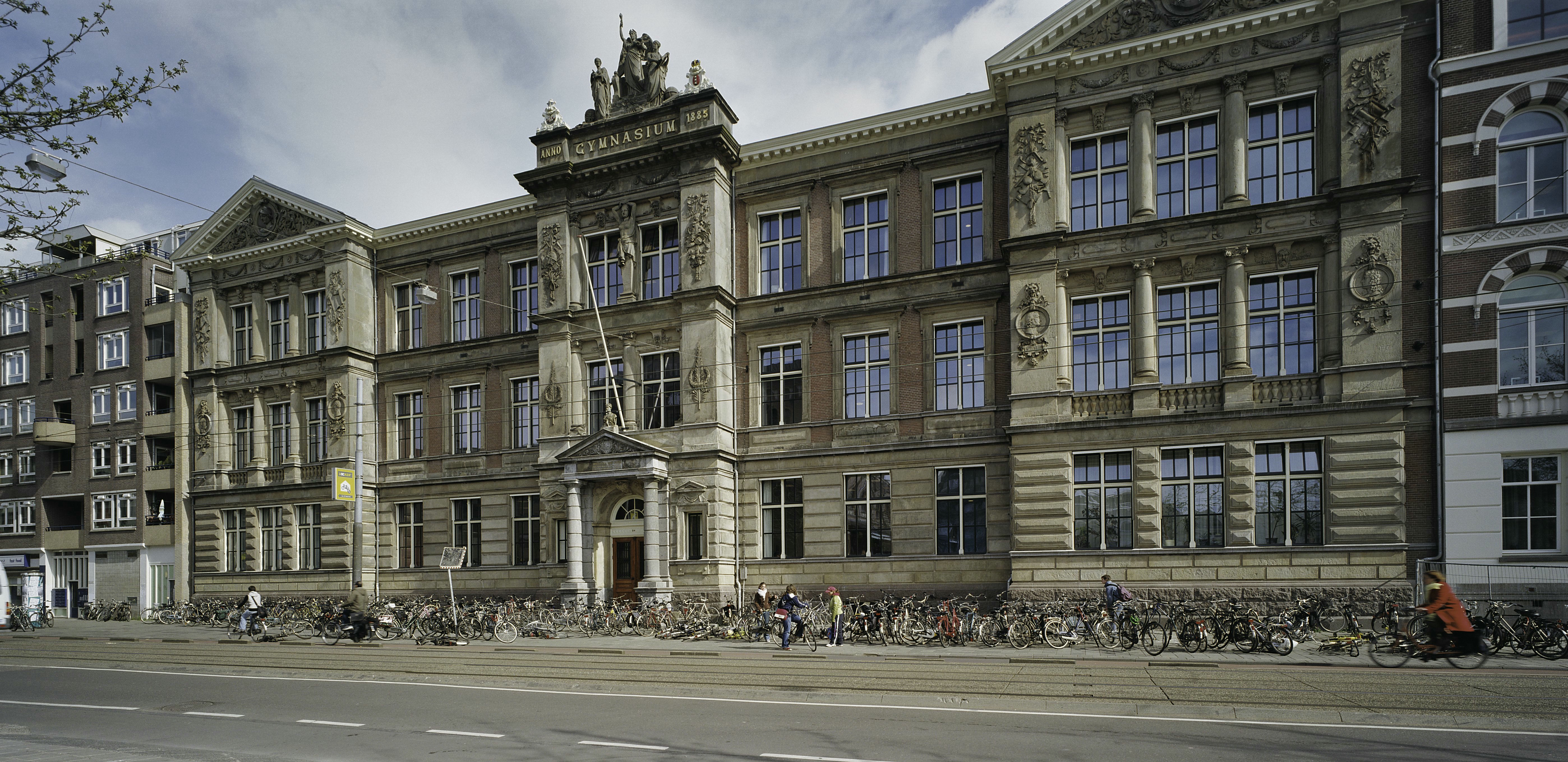
- Barlaeus Gymnasium in 2005

Location
- Weteringschans 29–31; Amsterdam, Netherlands
- Coordinates: 52°21′44″N 4°53′04″E

Information
- Type: Public Gymnasium
- Motto: Disciplina Vitae Scipio
- Established: 1885
- Principal: Susanne Lippert-Suarez Müller
- Staff: 90
- Enrollment: 800
- Colour: Blue
- Website: www.barlaeus.nl

The Barlaeus Gymnasium is a secondary school in Amsterdam in the Netherlands. It is one of the five categorial gymnasia in Amsterdam, the other four being Vossius Gymnasium, Ignatius Gymnasium, Het 4e Gymnasium and Cygnus Gymnasium. It offers a classical curriculum, including studies in Latin and Greek. The school stands opposite the music venue Paradiso, close to the Leidseplein.

Het Stedelijk Gymnasium was established in 1885. It is the oldest of the five gymnasia, although its origins stretch back to the Latijnse scholen (Latin schools) whose existence is documented as far back as 1594. Since 1927, the school has been named after Caspar Barlaeus. Famous alumni include politicians Frits Bolkestein, Els Borst and writer Willem Frederik Hermans.

== Former pupils ==
- Frits Bolkestein
- Els Borst
- Manja Croiset
- Eduard Douwes Dekker
- Hubertine Heijermans
- Willem Frederik Hermans
- Xaviera Hollander
- Lucie Horsch
- André Jolles
- Willy Lindwer
- Taylan Susam
- A. G. van Hamel
