= Hubertine Heijermans =

Dutch artist (1936–2022)

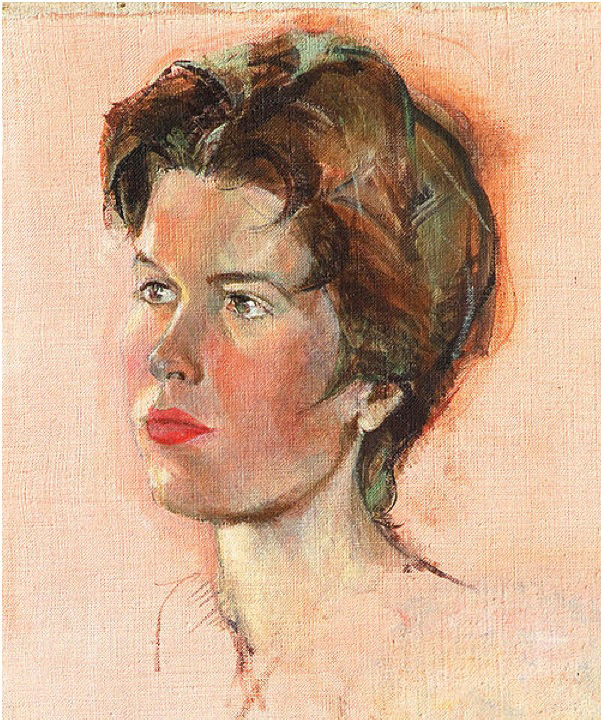
- 'Self-portrait' by Hubertine Heijermans, 1959
- Born: 8 January 1936; Amsterdam, Netherlands
- Died: 31 July 2022 (aged 86); Ollon, Canton de Vaud, Switzerland
- Occupation: Artist

Hubertine Heijermans (8 January 1936 – 31 July 2022) was a Dutch-born Swiss figurative painter, a multi-plate etching artist, Swiss printmaker and engraver, living in Canton de Vaud, Switzerland since 1958. She died on 31 July 2022, at the age of 86.

== Early life ==
Hubertine Heijermans was born in Amsterdam on 8 January 1936. Her ancestors include painter Marie Heijermans and writer Herman Heijermans. She was educated at the Barlaeus Gymnasium, took painting lessons from 1954 to 1957 with Jos Rovers, and then studied for 2 years at the Rijksakademie in Amsterdam with professor Gé Röling (1904–1981).

In 1958, she met Nils, born in the Netherlands, but a volunteer and an officer in the British Army during the second world war. They got married and settled in Lausanne, where in 1960 their son Anian was born. From 1968 to 1972, she studied etching techniques at the Villa Schifanoia (of the European Section of Rosary College of Arts and Sciences, Illinois USA, now Dominican University) and at Fiesole, Italy. The school was run by Dominican Sisters. In order for her to not remain all day in the convent, her etching teacher Swietlan Kraczyna found a studio in a palazzo overlooking Florence and the river Arno. In 1972, she won the Premio Brunelleschi (a Florentine prize for painters and sculptors) with a series of seven oilpaintings of a young Haitian woman, honored by Piero Bargellini the Mayor of Florence. She then returned to Villars in Switzerland with her heavy etching press Bendini-Bologna, who is not electrically driven, but has to be turned by hand. The couple divorced in 1973. Her former husband died in 2001 in France.

Hubertine Heijermans has lived and worked in Switzerland as an artist-painter and graveur Suisse since 1958. She has had her own artist studio, Atelier "Hubertine", in Canton de Vaud since 1981.

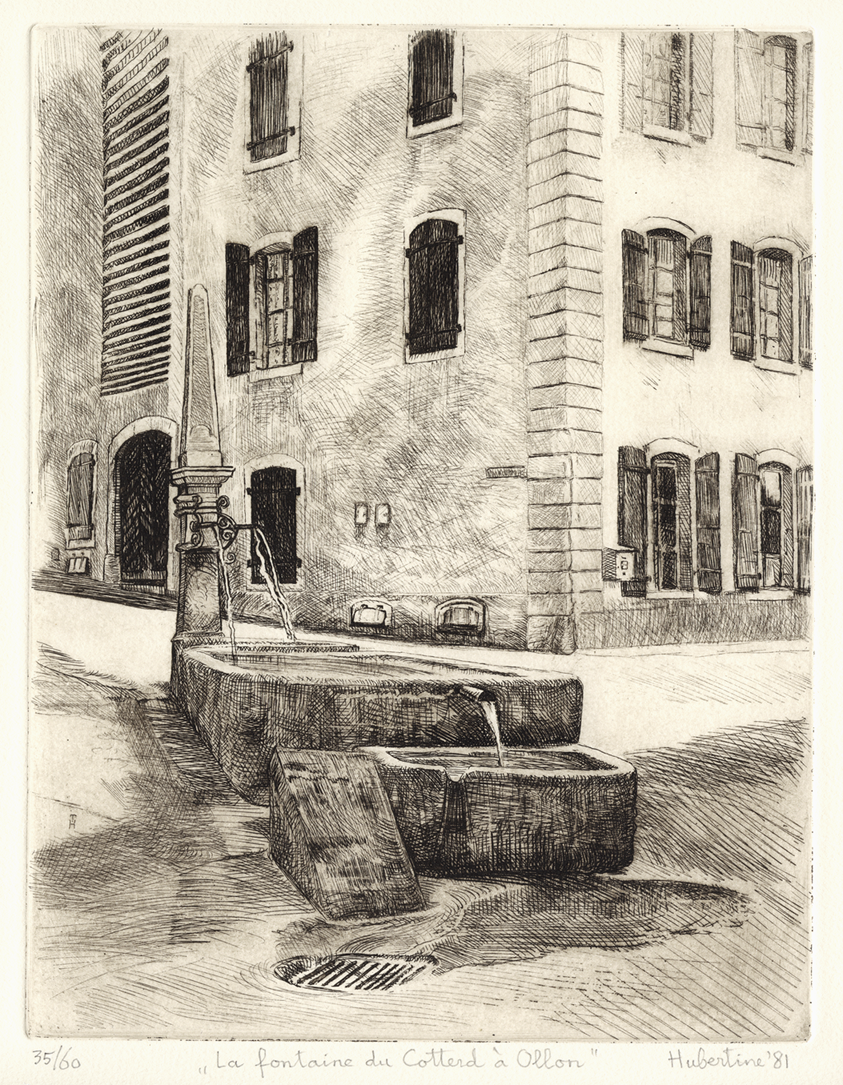
Ollon Fountain 'Le Cotterd' Etching 1981

== Portraits ==
Heijermans painted a series of portraits of actresses or 'Haute-Couture' models of Dior, Jean-Paul Gaultier and Yves Saint Laurent. Her brushes captured Isabelle Adjani playing in La Reine Margot, and Emmanuelle Béart, in the Une Femme Française. She found inspiration with the Swiss Circus Knie

== Painters from Italy and Spain ==
In 1970 Pietro Annigoni (Florence) Italy showed her ancient techniques in oil painting like the preparation of egg tempera, and explained the use of flake white, even when this is a toxic material, but because, he said, it would strengthen underlying first coats of her paint. His recipes including the white toxic lead powder improved the adherence of her paint and reduced the process of darkening and getting yellow with time. In the 90s Jesus Peñarreal equally showed the value of thin layers of glaze, which flake white allowed to paint. Peñarreal then sent Heijermans to study the Spanish impressionist painter Joaquín Sorolla y Bastida in the Museu de Belles Arts de València where students can draw.

== Exhibits ==
Exhibits in Florence (Italy) took place in 1969, 1970 and 1972 and in Switzerland from 1973 to 2008, after she settled in the Commune of Ollon. She exhibited in Aigle, Lausanne, Montreux, Fribourg, Sion, Porrentruy and in Aubonne near Lausanne. In 1994 Heijermans showed hundreds of oil paintings, watercolors and etchings in Singapore. Other exhibits were held in The Netherlands, in the Scheveningen (1964), Delft (1970), Amsterdam (1982) and Leiden (1983). The Musée Jenisch in Vevey now keeps 50 etchings, lithos and héliogravures, since recent work was added in 2007. The museum for photography Musée de l'Élysée in Lausanne conserves 45 photo-etchings since Charles-Henri Favrod in 1993 made a choice of her héliogravures as dust grain photogravures are called in French. The Dutch Museum van Bommel van Dam keeps 23 etchings and lithographies printed by herself on her own manually driven press since 1978, accepted after a vote of the Municipality of the town of Venlo. Her work can also be found at the Dominican University, Illinois. In July 2012, the Musée historique du Chablais in the Château de la Porte du Scex added 2 oilpaintings to their collection of etchings, lithos, héliogravures and woodcuts they already conserved, to the 80 artistproofs and handprinted originals executed by Heijermans. From 26 April until 28 October the Musée historique du Chablais in Vouvry organized 2 exhibits showing the history of the region, where the artist lives and works. For that reason her etchings, watercolors and oilpaintings, depicting sites of Les Ormonts region or the plain where the Rhône river joins the Lake Geneva, were on display and accompanied a show of the history of health resorts and hotels.

In 2014, the municipality of her commune awarded her the Mérite Boyard 2013, which included a bronze sculpture by André Raboud and funds to cover her expenses.

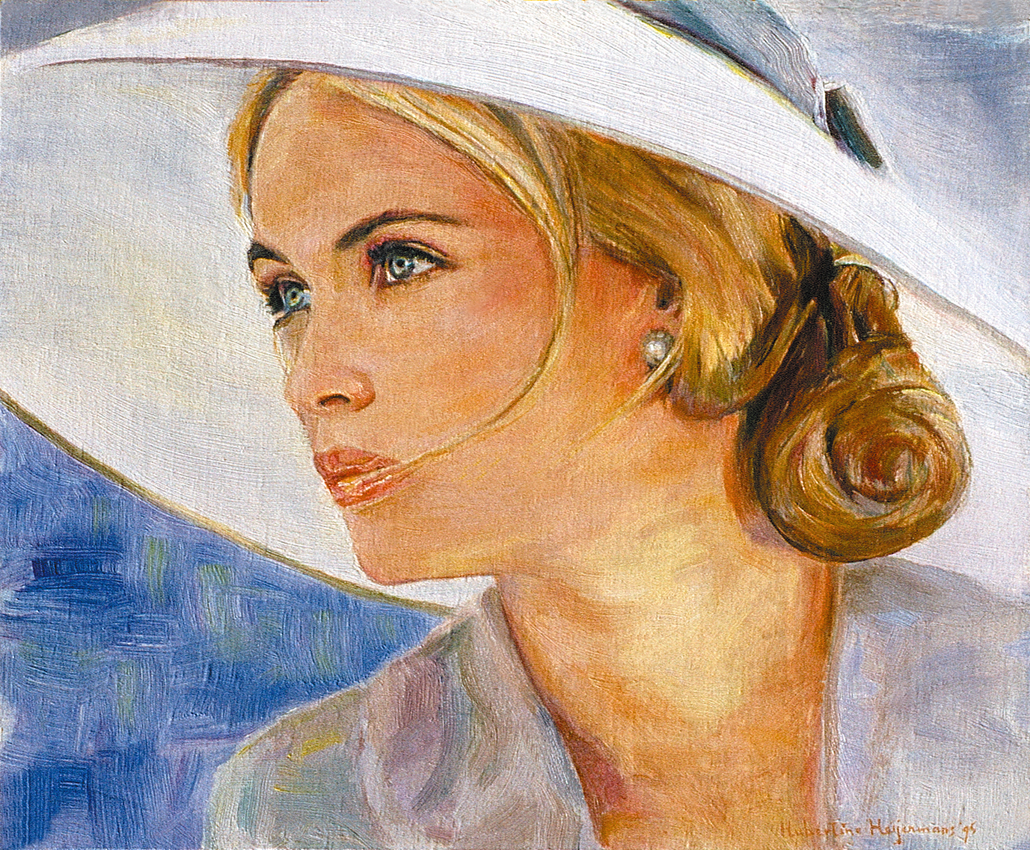
Emmanuelle Béart 1995

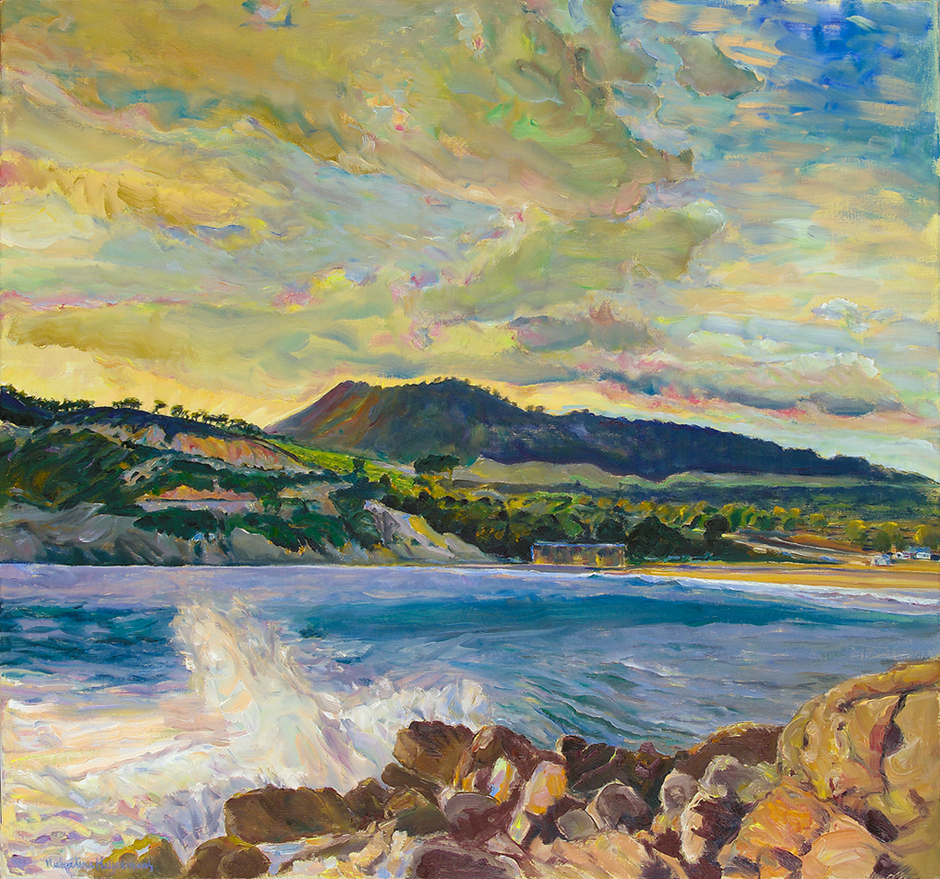
Oil painting Spain 2003

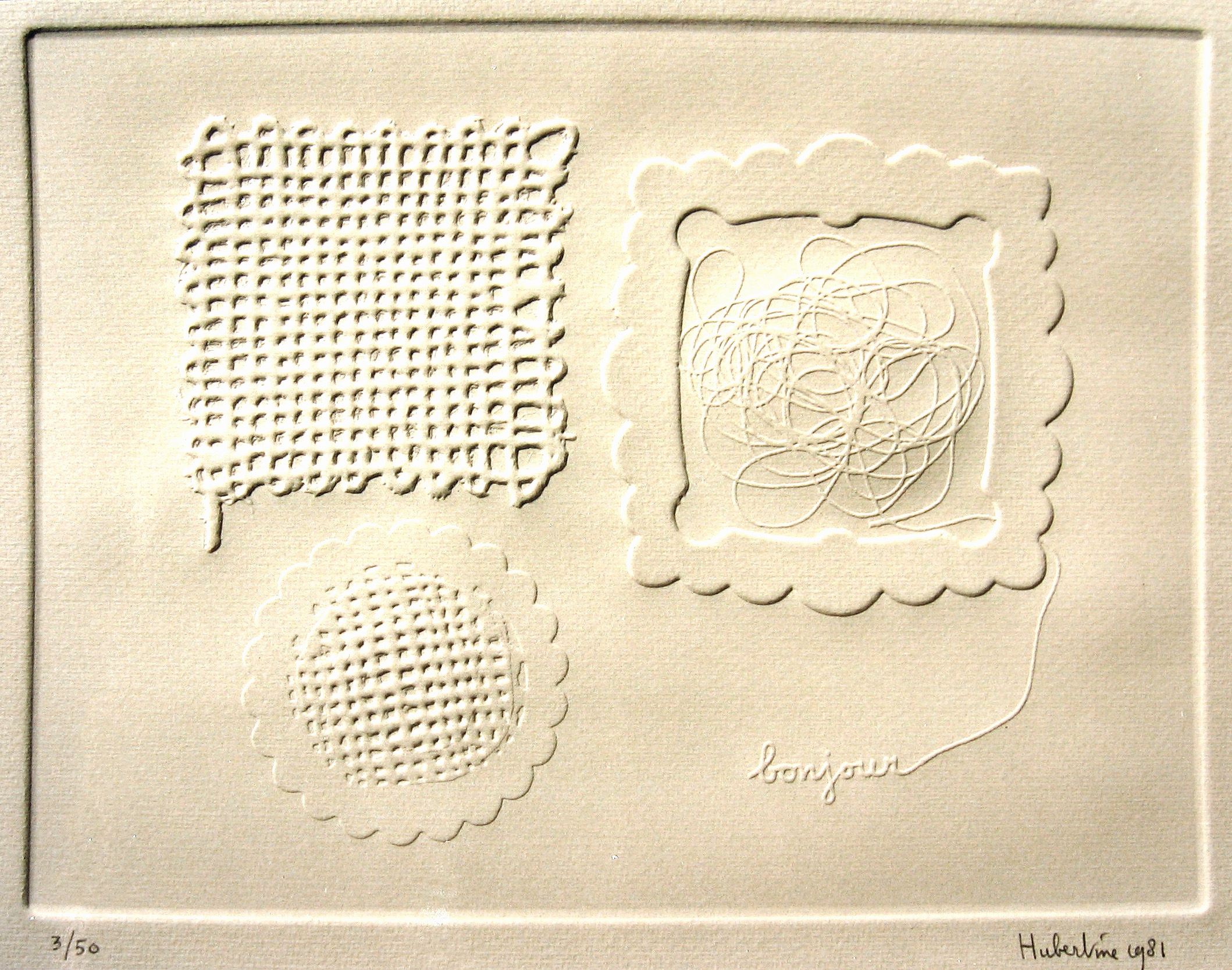
Bonjour photo-etching 1981

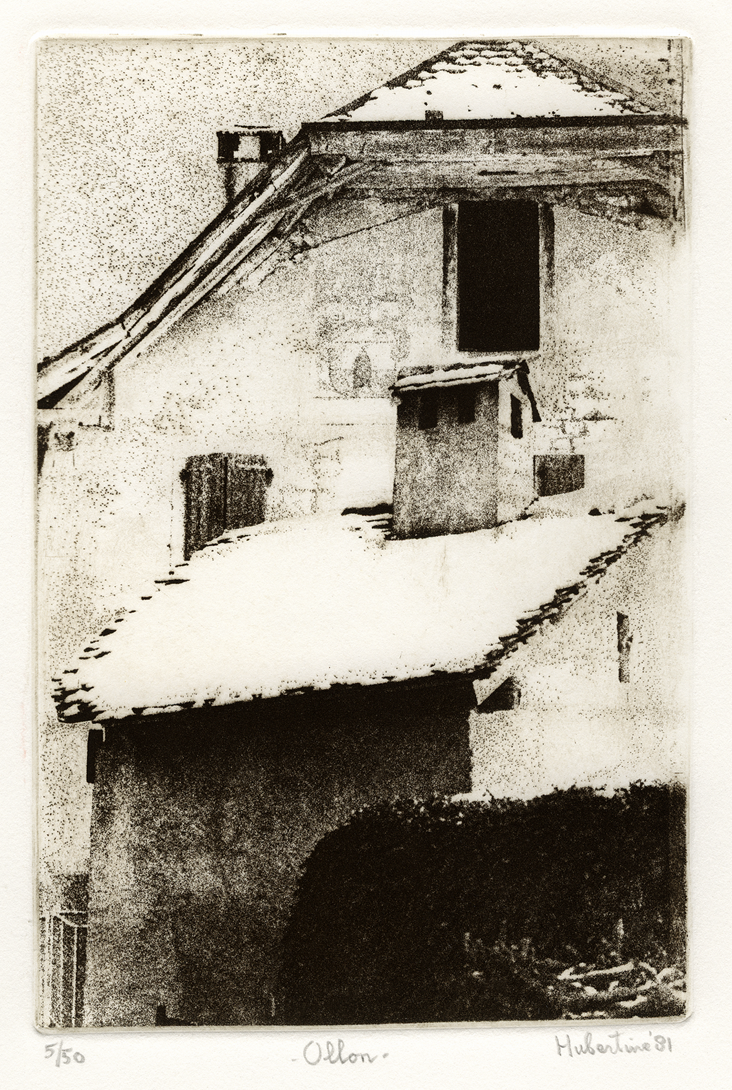
Ollon Rooftops photo-gravure 1981

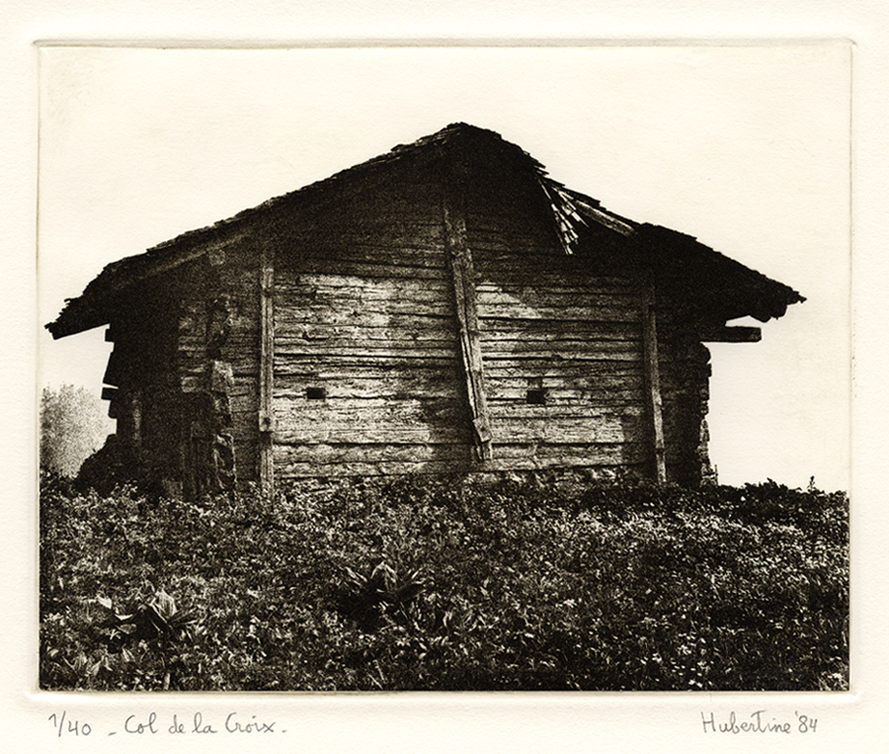
Villars Mountain hut photo-gravure 1984

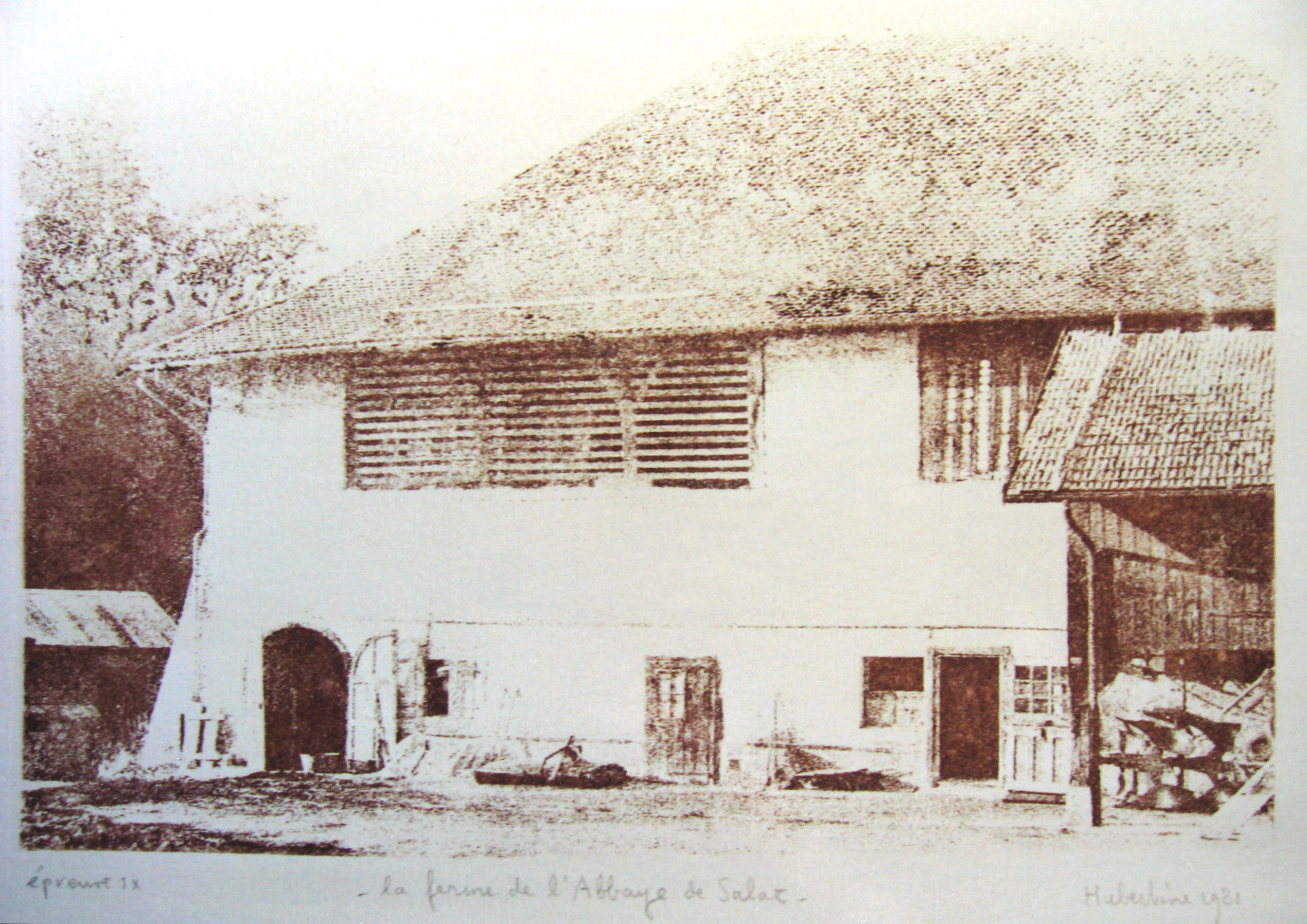
La Sallaz Farm of the Abbey photo-gravure executed by the artist

== Publications ==
- 1960 Bartholomeus en zijn dierenvrienden by Hubertine Heijermans, 's-Gravenhage; Rotterdam: Nijgh & Van Ditmar (Dutch)
- 2009 'Parcours d’une artiste-peintre' text by P.A.Genillard, ISBN 2-9700240-4-7 (French)
- 2010 'Monnaz Survol pittoresque d’un village dans la période 1961–1971, by Hubertine Heijermans, ISBN 978-2-8399-0683-8 (French)
- 2010 'Hubertine Heijermans Parcours d’une artiste peintre II', by Hubertine Heijermans, ISBN 978-2-8399-0715-6 (French and English)
