= Bram Moszkowicz =

Dutch jurist and former lawyer

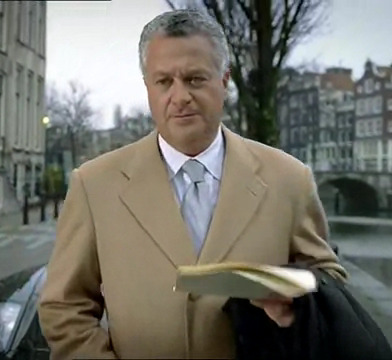
- Moszkowicz in 2013
- Born: Abraham Maarten Moszkowicz; 26 June 1960 (age 66); Maastricht, Netherlands
- Occupation: Lawyer
- Years active: –2013

Abraham Maarten "Bram" Moszkowicz (Dutch pronunciation: [ˈaːbraːɦɑm ˈmaːrtə(m) brɑm ˈmɔskoːʋɪtɕ]; born 26 June 1960) is a Dutch jurist and former lawyer.

== Early life and education ==
Abraham Maarten Moszkowicz was born on 26 June 1960 in Maastricht in the Netherlands. He is the son of Berthe Bessant and lawyer Max Moszkowicz. He is of Jewish descent from his father's side.

He studied law in Amsterdam.

== Clients and controversies ==
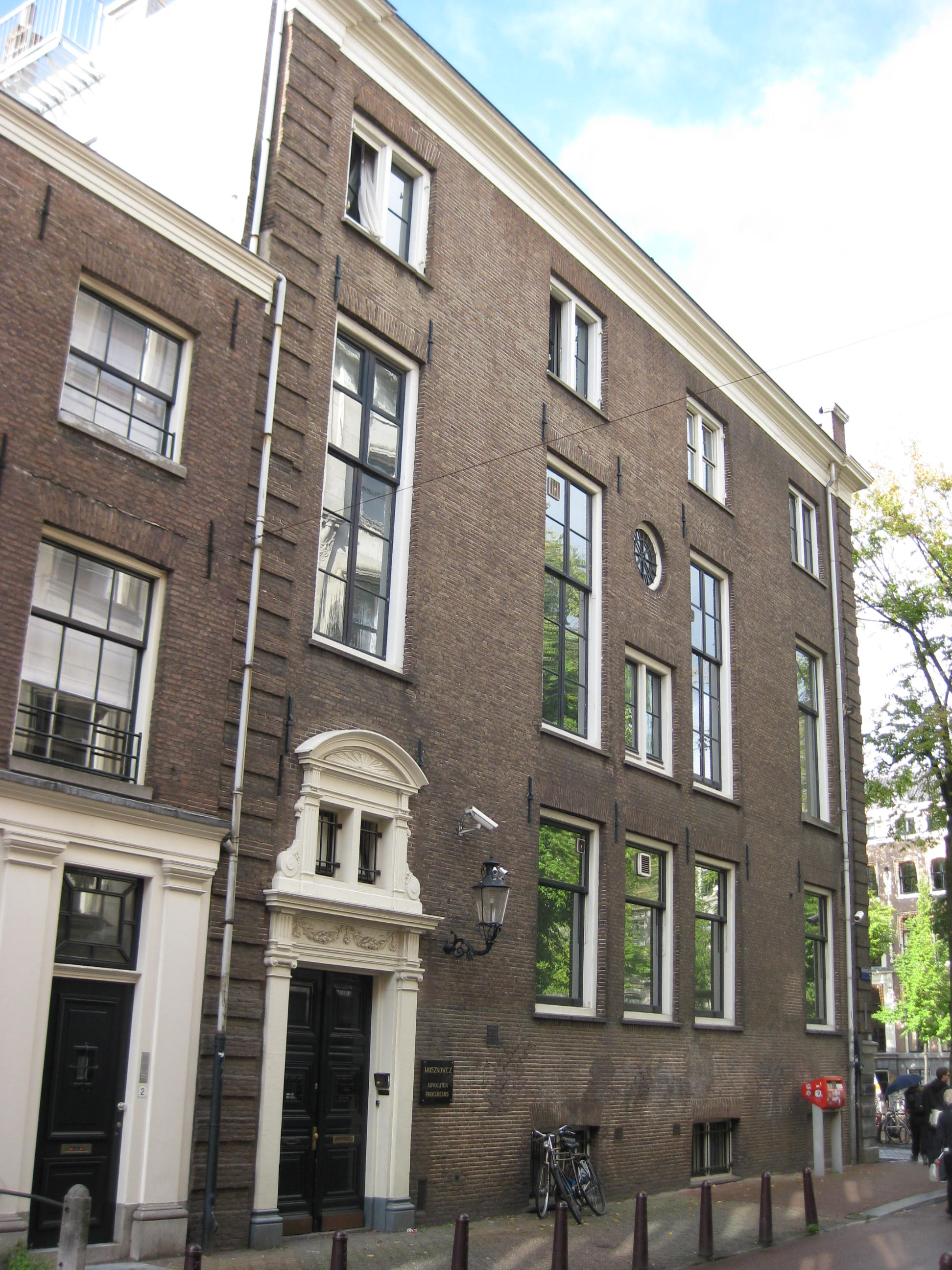
The former office of Bram Moszkowicz in Amsterdam

Moszkowicz had clientele, such as Dutch criminal Cor van Hout, the Surinamese military leader Dési Bouterse, diva Patty Brard, real estate magnate Willem Endstra, top criminal and gangster Willem Holleeder, politician Geert Wilders, Manchester United and Netherlands international football player Robin van Persie, the American-Dutch "Drug rehabilitation guru" and ex-TV presenter Keith Bakker as well as the former friend of Talitha van Zon, on woman trafficking.

Moszkowicz resigned as lawyer for Willem Holleeder in 2007.

In 2010, it became known that Moszkowicz had evaded over one million Euro of income taxes in the period 2003–2006. The period 2007-2010 is still being investigated.

On 30 October 2012, it was announced that he was disbarred. His appeal was rejected on 22 April 2013, which means Moszkowicz lost the right to practice law.

On 21 April 2015 it was announced that Moszkowicz would become the party leader and lijsttrekker of the classical liberal party VoorNederland at the next Dutch general election, planned for 2017, but after nine months he was rejected by the party.

== Personal life ==
Having been in several other relationships and already having children from an earlier marriage, he was in a relationship with former newsreader Eva Jinek. In late October 2012 it was announced that the relationship had ceased and that they would remain friends.

== Bibliography ==
- 2012: Liever rechtop sterven dan op je knieën leven (Rather die upright than live on your knees)
- 2013: Onkruid (Weed)
- 2014: Maffiamaat (Mafia Buddy) with Leon de Winter
