= Max Moszkowicz =

Dutch lawyer (1926–2022)

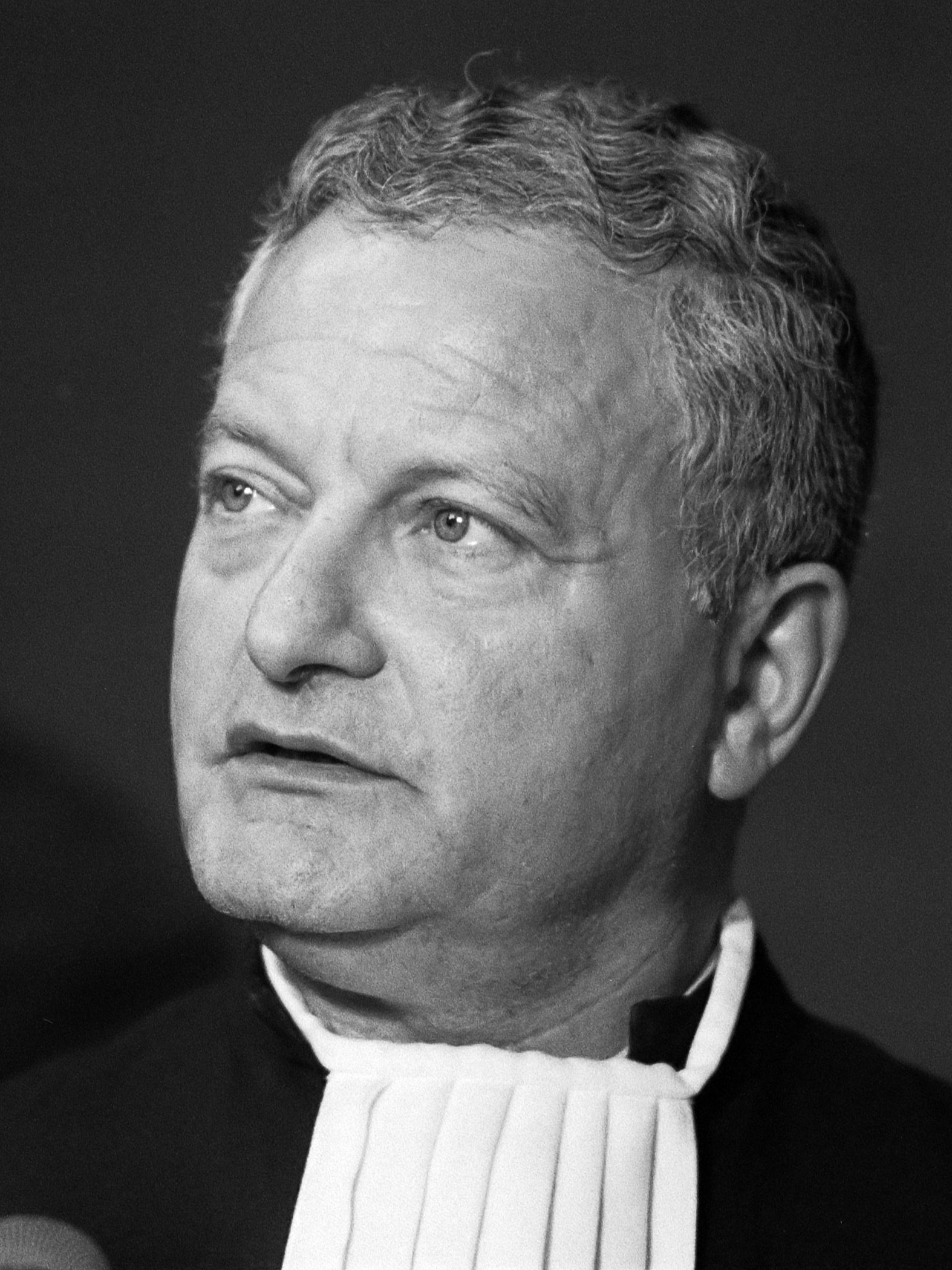
- Moszkowicz in 1985
- Born: 5 October 1926; Essen, Westphalia, Prussia, Germany
- Died: 27 January 2022 (aged 95); Lanaken, Belgium
- Occupation: Lawyer

Max Moszkowicz Sr. (5 October 1926 – 27 January 2022) was a Dutch lawyer.

== Biography ==
Moszkowicz was born on 5 October 1926 in Essen, Westphalia, Prussia, Germany. The Jewish Moszkowicz family fled Nazi Germany in 1933. During the Holocaust his parents were murdered. Max Moszkowicz himself survived Auschwitz.

He became well known in the Netherlands for defending the godfather of the Amsterdam underworld Klaas Bruinsma and the Heineken kidnappers Cor van Hout and Willem Holleeder. Moszkowicz was a member of the People's Party for Freedom and Democracy (VVD).

Moszkowicz was the father of former lawyers David Moszkowicz (1950–2022), Robert Moszkowicz (born 1953), Max Moszkowicz Jr. (born 1955), and Bram Moszkowicz (born 1960). David, Robert, and Bram were disbarred in 2016, 2006, and 2013. He died on 27 January 2022, at the age of 95.
