= Robbert Baruch =

Dutch lobbyist

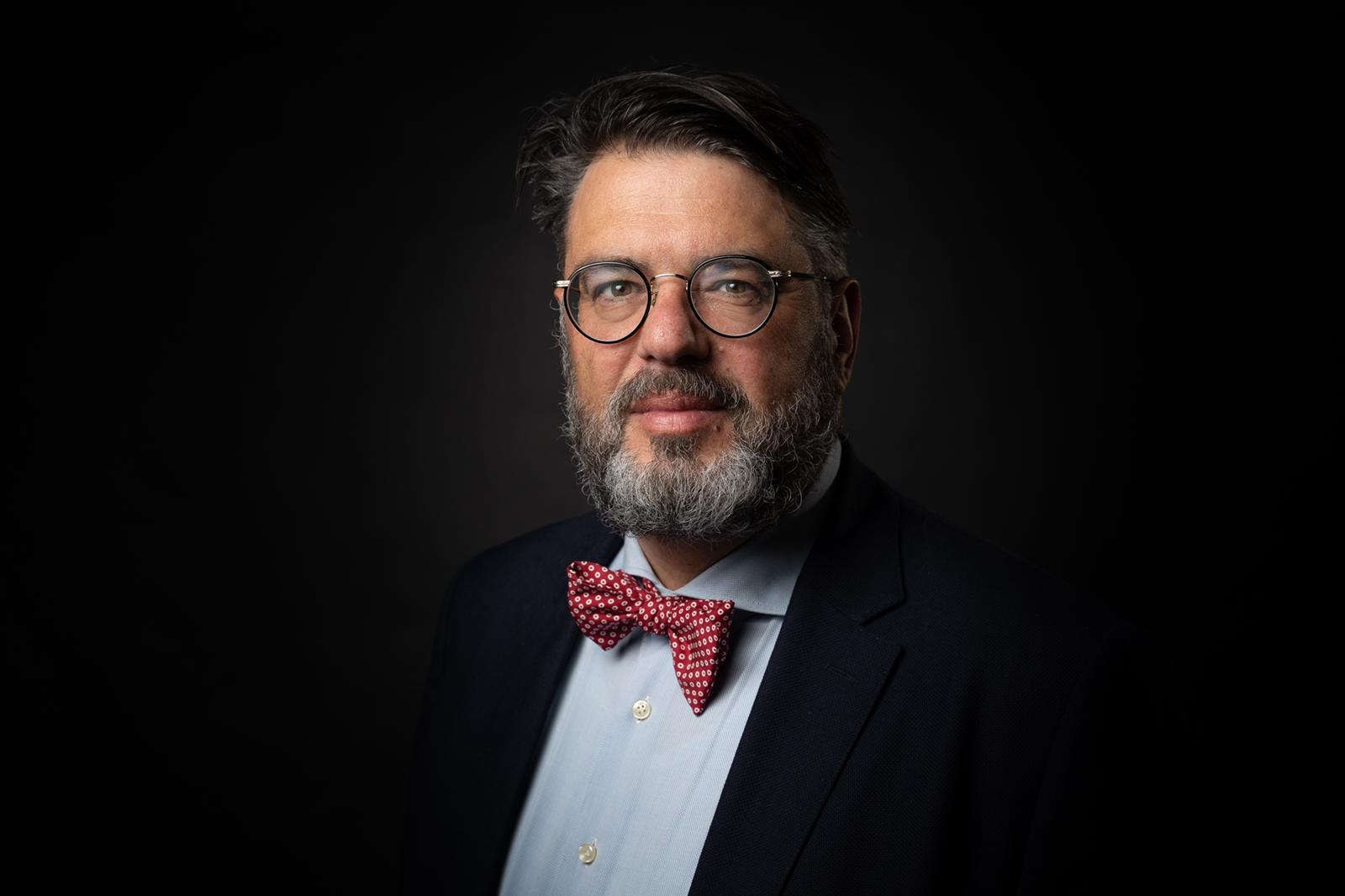
- Born: 12 October 1967 (age 58)
- Occupations: Manager Public Affairs in Buma/Stemra; Lobbyist in Dutch Association of Insurers (2009-2012) alderman, deputy mayor, Feijenoord
- Political party: PvdA

Robbert Baruch (Amsterdam, 12 October 1967) is a Dutch lobbyist, public administrator and former PvdA politician in the Netherlands. From 2006 to 2009 he was the Deputy Mayor and Alderman on behalf of the PvdA in the Rotterdam borough of Feijenoord. From 2012 to 2021 he was Manager Public Affairs in Buma/Stemra. In 2021 Baruch held the role of Senior Vice President Public Affairs, Europe to Universal Music Group (UMG). Since 2024, he has also been responsible for multilateral relations.

== Biography ==
Baruch studied political philosophy and public administration with Bart Tromp and Andreas Kinneging at Leiden University. Being Jewish, he also studied theology at the Nederland Israelitisch Seminarium in Amsterdam and at Machon Meir in Jerusalem. He writes the longest running political blog in the Netherlands and was a member of the Provincial Council of South Holland from 2003 to 2007. As the PvdA candidate, he took the role of Deputy Mayor and Alderman in Rotterdam borough of Feijenoord From 2006 to 2009. In 2013 he was candidate for ballot leader for PvdA at the 2014 European elections,

Throughout his life, Baruch had embraced the importance of the local communities and social inclusion initiatives. He led many initiatives to renaming streets and public spaces after local heroes. In the Afrikaanderwijk neighbourhood of Rotterdam, He initiated renaming streets after Afrikaners from the Boer Wars to more current and diverse politicians. He also informally named a sports park there after the local Hip-Hop artist Helderheid. In 2021 the Rotterdam Municipality formalised this and officially named the park Helderheidplein.

He defended the role of mosques committees in mitigating poverty issues and public safety and helped Muslim groups in Feijenoord to qualify for municipal funds by widening the beneficiary base of their social activities projects. He lobbied for the preservation of Jewish and Muslim ritual slaughter. In 2013 he was one of the PvdA candidates for the party leader at the European elections. In 2025, Baruch resigned from the Labour Party after its merger with GroenLinks and what he described as strong anti-Israel positions within the new party.

In 2021 Baruch held the role of Senior Vice President Public Affairs, Europe to Universal Music Group (UMG). From 2012 to 2021 he was manager Public Affairs at Buma/Stemra, the Dutch collective management society for composers and music publishers. During COVID-19 pandemic, Robbert has led the efforts of the Emergency Fund and the Investment Fund for Dutch composers, lyricists and music publishers.

== Personal life ==
Baruch married and had three children. His oldest daughter, Rebecca Baruch, died in 2024 whilst serving in the Israel Defense Forces and is buried on Mount Herzl.
