= Sam Swaap =

Dutch violinist and conductor

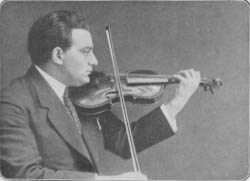
Sam Swaap c. 1923

Sam Swaap (Amsterdam, 15 October 1888 – The Hague, 8 November 1971) was a Dutch violinist and conductor.

== Early life ==
Samuel (Sam) Swaap, the son of David Swaap (1859–1942) and Elisabeth Halberstad (1853–1928), began playing the violin at the age of eight and received his first lessons from H.W. Hofmeester. He enrolled in the Amsterdam Conservatorium and studied under Carl Flesch from 1904 to 1907. Swaap made his debut as a soloist with the Royal Concertgebouw Orchestra at the age of 16 and entered the orchestra's first violin section in 1909.

In 1913, Swaap went to Finland for two years to serve as a concertmaster in Abo. The outbreak of the World War I brought him back to the Netherlands. Upon his return, he was appointed concertmaster of the Residence Orchestra in The Hague (Den Haag). During that time, Swaap was a member of two chamber ensembles: the Haagsche Strijkwartet and the Frenkel Trio. Swaap's friend, Charles van Isterdael, played cello in both ensembles and also in the Residence Orchestra.

Swaap recorded many solo violin pieces (see list below), most of which are dated between 1922 and 1924. Swaap performed as a soloist throughout Europe, including France, Spain, Germany, Finland, Denmark and Holland. Some composers dedicated pieces to Swaap, including the Dutch composer Willem de Boer, who dedicated his Sarabande to Swaap in 1923, and Leon Orthel (1905–1985) who dedicated his Capriccio op.19 to Swaap in 1939.

== World War II ==
The Nazi invasion of Holland on 10 May 1940, and the subsequent restrictions on Jews around the country, affected Swaap's career as a musician. He was given fewer and fewer opportunities to perform with the Residence Orchestra and some documents point out that "his chair was pulled back", meaning he could no longer sit in the front of the first violin section. Early in 1941 he was dismissed from the orchestra and joined other Jewish musicians who had lost their jobs with the "Jewish Orchestra" (Joods Orkest) which was active from November 1941 to July 1942. Swaap became chairman of that orchestra.

In December, 1942 Swaap was imprisoned in Barneveld for six months until he was transported to Westerbork. By September 1944, he was deported to Theresienstadt concentration camp (identified as "Group C" in the transport list). Swaap lost two brothers in the war.

== After the War ==
On 4 February 1945, Swaap was notified that he would be transferred from Theresienstadt concentration camp to Switzerland, where he could settle. The Residence Orchestra offered Swaap the opportunity to return to his position. He accepted and on 20 November 1945 he played his first post-war concert in Diligentia. A month later, on the occasion of the Chanoekafeest, he played in Museum Boijmans Van Beuningen in Rotterdam.

In 1947 Swaap retired from the Residence Orchestra. A year later, he formed the Dutch Chamber Symphony Orchestra and then dedicated most of his time to conducting. During the course of his career, Swaap received a number of awards. He died in 1971 at the age of 83.

== Legacy ==
The Felicja Blumental Music Library, Tel Aviv, hosts his collection of music.

== List of recordings ==
1. Schubert: Ave Maria
2. Sibelius: Valse triste
3. Mascagni: Cavalleria Rusticana, Intermezzo.
4. Dvořák: Indian lament
5. Tosti: La serenata
6. Handel: Arioso
7. Bach (Arr. Gounod): Ave Maria
8. Beethoven: Romance
9. Saint-Saëns: Le déluge, Prélude
10. Mlynarski: Mazurka
11. G Pierné: Sérénade
12. A d'Ambrosio: Canzonetta
13. Massenet: Méditation
14. Fiorillo Arr J Wolfsthal: Caprice
15. Antonín Dvořák: Larghetto
16. Gabriel Fauré: Berceuse op.16
17. Beethoven (arrangement) – Piano Sonata no.8, Adagio
18. C. Franck: Panis Angelicus
19. Widor: Serenade
20. Padre Martini: Gavoute
