= Gerard van den Anker =

Dutch politician (born 1972)

Member of the House of Representatives
- In office 12 January 2021 – 30 March 2021
- Preceded by: Michel Rog

Alderman in Maasdriel
- In office 12 May 2014 – 9 May 2018
- In office 2002–2010

Member of the Maasdriel municipal council
- In office 11 March 2010 – 12 May 2014
- Succeeded by: Leo van Doremaele
- In office 4 January 1999 – 2002

Personal details
- Born: G.P. van den Anker; 18 March 1972 (age 53); Hedel, Netherlands
- Political party: Christian Democratic Appeal
- Occupation: Fruit farmer

Gerard P. van den Anker (born 18 March 1972) is a Dutch politician, who served as a member of the House of Representatives between January and March 2021. He is a member of the Christian Democratic Appeal (CDA).

A fruit grower, Van den Anker became involved in local politics in Maasdriel in 1999, when he was elected to its municipal council. He later also served as alderman and deputy mayor until he retired from Maasdriel politics in 2018. Van den Anker subsequently became chair of the Nederlandse Fruittelers Organisatie (Dutch fruit growers association) and a member of the Rivierenland water board.

== Early life and career ==
He was born in 1972 in the Gelderland village Hedel as the son of Cor van den Anker, who served as an alderman in that village. Van den Anker went to an agrarian school in Tiel to become a fruit grower, and he has a fruit farm together with his father and uncle in Hedel, where they mainly grow Conference pears. During his political career, he would keep working there.

=== Local politics ===
When a few municipalities were about to merge to form Maasdriel in 1999, a special election was held to determine its nineteen municipal councilors. Van den Anker appeared as the fourteenth candidate on the CDA's party list, and was elected due to his over 300 preferential votes. He was installed in January 1999. He became a member of the social affairs, education, and recreation committee. Van den Anker was appointed part-time alderman of social affairs after the 2002 election and simultaneously left the municipal council. When alderman Kees Leenders departed his position in July 2005, Van den Anker started working full-time as alderman, became deputy mayor, and added spatial planning and housing to his portfolio. Previously, he also worked at a marketing and secondment agency. He remained alderman and deputy mayor after the 2006 election, during which he was his party's lijsttrekker.

Van den Anker became chairman of the housing corporation De Goede Woning – Neerijnen next to his job as alderman in 2008. In his municipality, he unsuccessfully proposed widening the A2 motorway to four lanes in both directions, although the council supported the idea. Van den Anker was also involved in plans to redevelop Kerkdriel's town center. After the 2010 election in Maasdriel, the CDA did not become part of the municipal executive. Van den Anker returned to the municipal council, as he was again elected as his party's lijsttrekker. He also ran for member of the States of Gelderland in 2011, appearing fifteenth on the party list, but did not manage to win a seat.

Van den Anker was once again re-elected as CDA's lijsttrekker in 2014 and returned as alderman of spatial planning and deputy mayor in the new municipal executive. In 2016, he left De Goede Woning – Neerijnen, and he announced in 2017 that he would not run for re-election the following year. When he left as alderman in May 2018, Van den Anker received the first Maasdriel honorary medal for his years in local politics. He became the chair of the Nederlandse Fruittelers Organisatie (Dutch fruit growers association) in June 2018. He also participated in the 2019 water board election in Rivierenland as the second candidate on CDA's party list, thus becoming a member of the board. Van den Anker would also serve as the leader of the CDA on that body, and he did not run for re-election in 2023.

=== House of Representatives (2021) ===
He ran for member of parliament (MP) in the 2017 general election, but was not elected. He was 25th on the CDA's party list and received 2,815 preferential votes. Van den Anker became a member of the House of Representatives in January 2021, when MP Michel Rog left the House to focus on his new job as alderman in Haarlem. The 24th candidate on the CDA's party list in 2017, Stijn Steenbakkers, had declined to succeed him. Due to his appointment, Van den Anker temporarily left his position at the Dutch fruit growers association, but he remained a member of the water board. In the House, he served on the Committee for Agriculture, Nature, and Food Quality. His term ended at the end of March after the 2021 general election.

He became the president of the Coöperatieve Tuinbouwveiling Zaltbommel en Omstreken (Cooperative horticulture auction house Zaltbommel and environs) in February 2022 and simultaneously left the Nederlandse Fruittelers Organisatie. Van den Anker worked to digitize the auction house's clock.

== Personal life ==
Van den Anker lived in Hedel when he was a member of parliament. He has a girlfriend called Kitty, and he has a son.
