= Wordragen =

- Hamlet
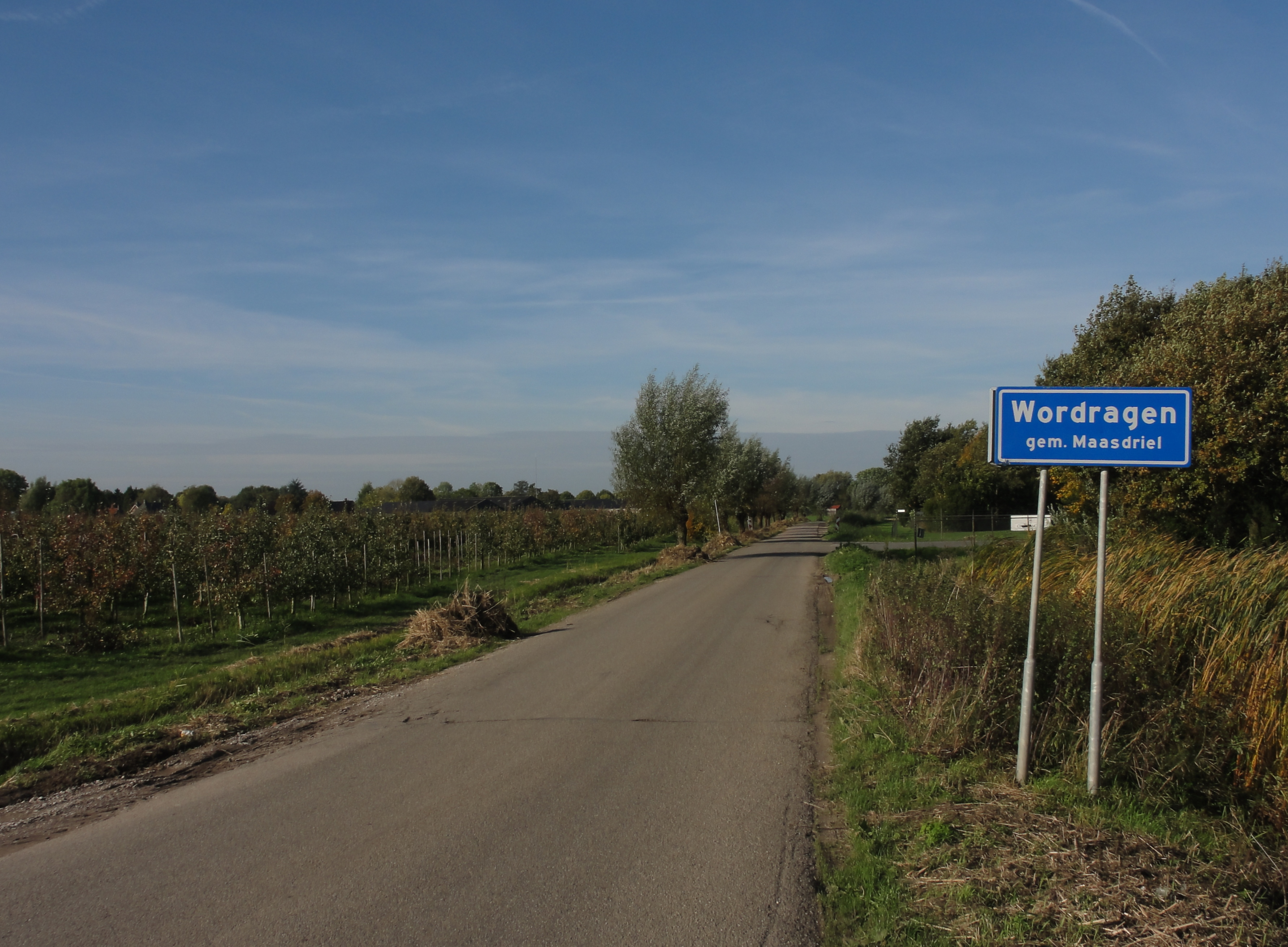
- Welcome to Wordragen

- Location in the Netherlands Wordragen (Netherlands)
- Coordinates: 51.75737°N 5.22674°E
- Country: Netherlands
- Province: Gelderland
- Municipality: Maasdriel
- Elevation: 3 m (9.8 ft)
- Time zone: UTC+1 (CET)
  - Summer (DST): UTC+2 (CEST)
- Postal code: 5324
- Dialing code: 073

Wordragen is a Dutch hamlet, north of Ammerzoden in the Maasdriel municipality of Gelderland province.

It was first mentioned in the 13th century as Vurdragen. The etymology is unknown, however it contains woerd (terp, an artificial living mound). Wordragen is not a statistical entity, and the postal authorities have placed it under Ammerzoden. In 1840, it was home to 94 people. Nowadays it consists of about 40 houses.
