= Ammersoyen Castle =

Castle in Gelderland, Netherlands

Coordinates: 51.7515°N 5.2294°E

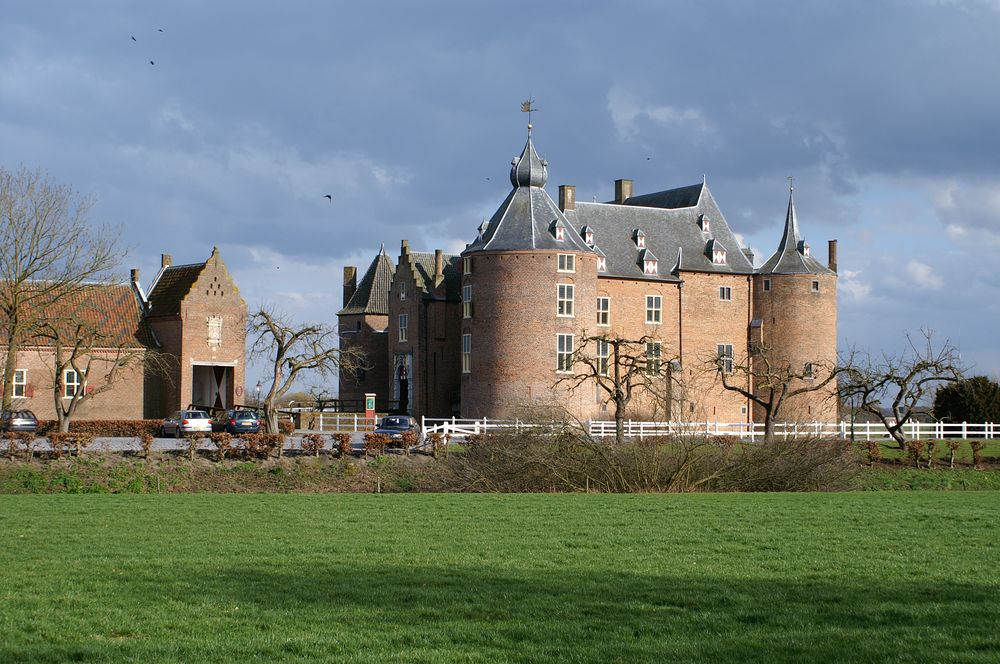
Ammersoyen Castle

Ammersoyen Castle (Dutch: Kasteel Ammersoyen) is located in Ammerzoden in the Bommelerwaard region in the province of Gelderland, the Netherlands. When the original construction of the castle occurred is unclear; some sources claim it was as early as the 12th century. However, the consensus among historians is that the Van Herlaer family completed the castle in the 1350s. At the time of its construction, the castle was built along a branch of the river Maas. Just a few years after the construction of the castle was completed, the river was rerouted leaving the castle to be surrounded by a moat.

== Architecture ==
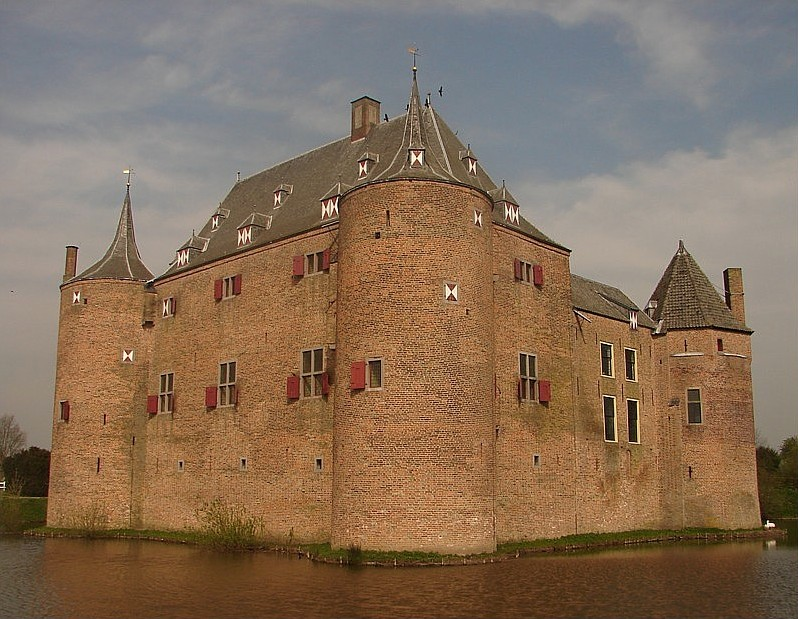
Ammersoyen Castle in ca. 2010

The castle was designed to be a defensive fortress. When it was originally constructed, it had a central courtyard, surrounded by four heavy towers on the corners. Connecting these four towers were four heavy wings, one on each side of the courtyard. Ammersoyen Castle is a good example of the type of castle that was made famous by Count Floris V of Holland. Even though it was originally built on a river, the Van Herlaers believed that all four sides of the castle needed to be fortified. To add to the security, the original design included a moat that ensured any attacker could only invade through the front of the fortress. Except for a brief period in the early 20th century, the castle has always been completely surrounded by the moat. The castle was built using a fixed plan, something that was quite uncommon for medieval castles. A fixed plan means that the entire castle was built as a whole, as opposed to multiple phases, which was often the case with other medieval castles.

== Location ==
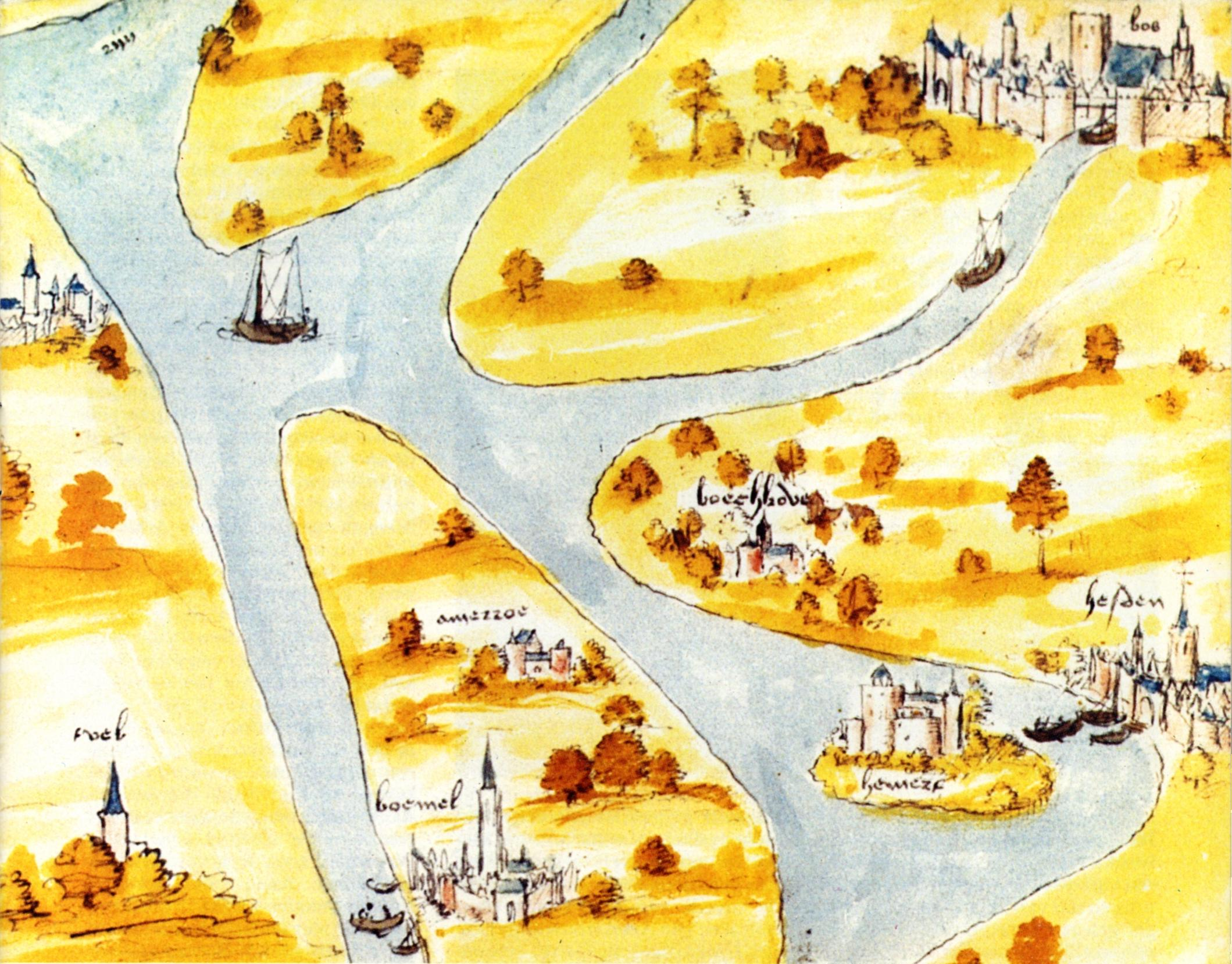
Ammersoyen on a map of ca. 1534

The earliest mention of Ammerzoden, or Ambersoi as it was once known, was in the 11th century. Given that the village was built on a river with very arable lands, it was most likely just a small farming community with little importance until the creation of the castle in the 14th century. Today, the village is home to approximately 4000 people, and since 1999 has been part of the municipality of Maasdriel. Prior to 1999, Ammerzoden was its own municipality.

== History ==
=== 14th century–16th century ===
Dirk Van Herlaer, of the Van Herlaer family, built the castle in the 1350s. Upon Dirk's death in 1354, the castle was passed onto his eldest son, Gerhard. Over the next 30 years the castle passed hands numerous times within the family. When Gerhard died, the castle was passed onto his brother, Arent. Gerhard had no children to claim the castle as part of their inheritance, which is the reason it was passed to his brother. When Arent died in 1384, the castle was given to his son, Arent Hoeman. It is under Arent Hoeman where the Van Herlaer's lost control of the castle for good.

The castle is located in the province of Gelderland, the Netherlands. In the late 14th century, Duke William of Gelder's and Julich controlled Gelderland. Arent Hoeman was one of the most trusted friends of Duke William. In 1386 a war broke out due to a land dispute between Gelderland and the Duchy of Brabant. The Burgundians were aggressively trying to expand their territory at this time, and tried to take over parts of Gelderland.

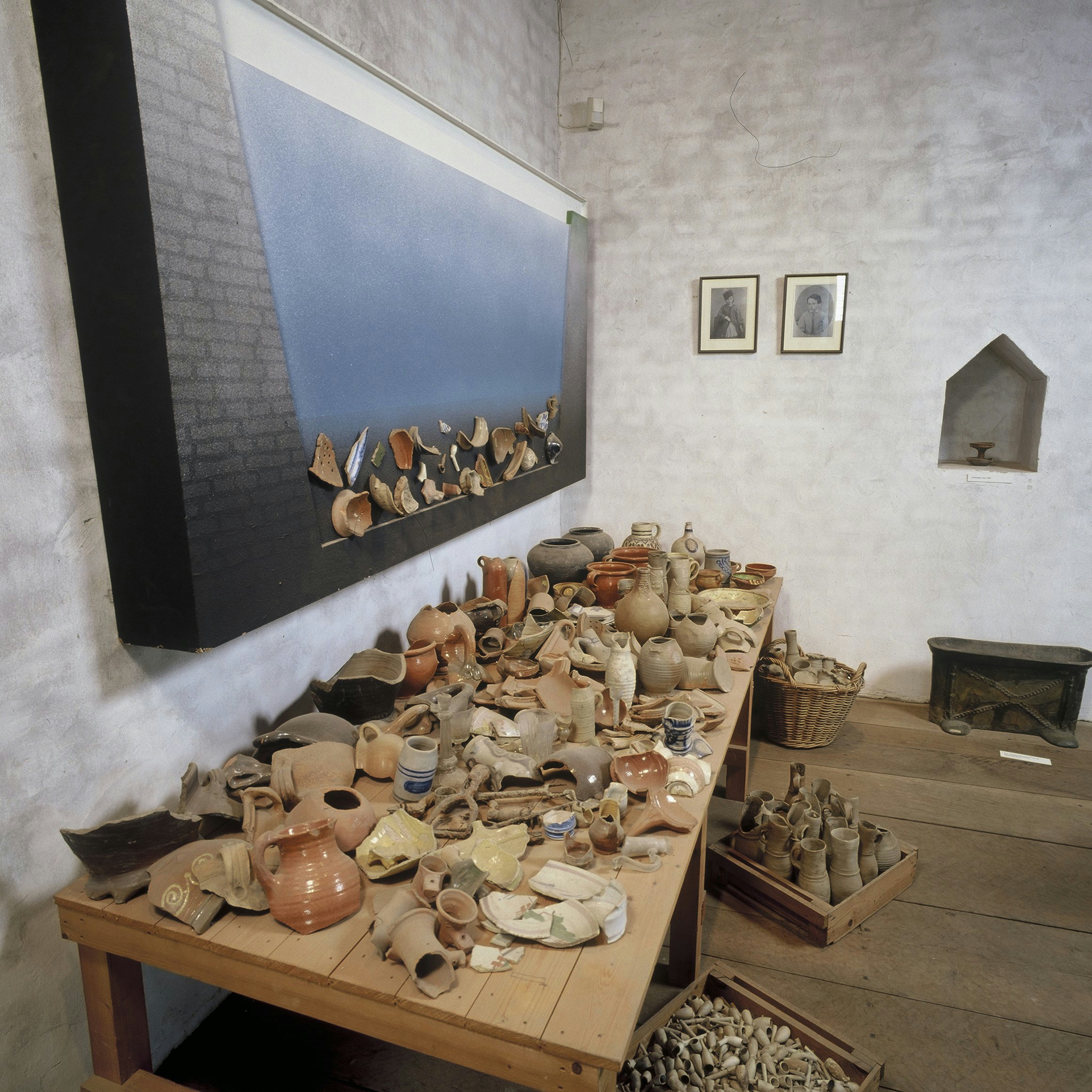
Archaeological findings from the moat on display in the castle

Despite his close relationship with Duke William, Arent Hoeman sided with the Duchess of Brabant. William, unsurprisingly, saw this as an act of betrayal and abruptly ended his friendship with Arent Hoeman. Just days later, Duke William invaded Ammerzoden, capturing both Arent Hoeman and the castle. Thus, in 1386 the castle came under the control of Duke William.

Following the end of the war, Duke Williams gave the castle to his illegitimate son in 1405. His son did not hold the castle for long, as he sold it to Johan Van Broeckhuysen, lord of the Waardenburg, in 1424. The castle only changed hands by marriage for the next 400 years. In 1496, Johan Van Broeckhuysen married Otto Van Arkel, which ended up giving the Van Arkel family control of the castle for centuries. The Van Arkel family was a well-known and quite wealthy family in the region at the time of the wedding. At the end of their rule, the Van Arkels had controlled the castle for five generations.

In 1513, during the Guelderian Wars, the Habsburgs attempted to seize control of the castle from across the River Maas, and briefly occupied the castle. Burgundian troops, led by Count Henrick Van Nassau, occupied the castle for a brief time in the mid-16th century. During the siege and subsequent occupation, the castle was moderately damaged and a large amount of personal property needed to be replaced. At this point in their rule, the Van Arkels were still very rich, so they had the means to repair the castle.

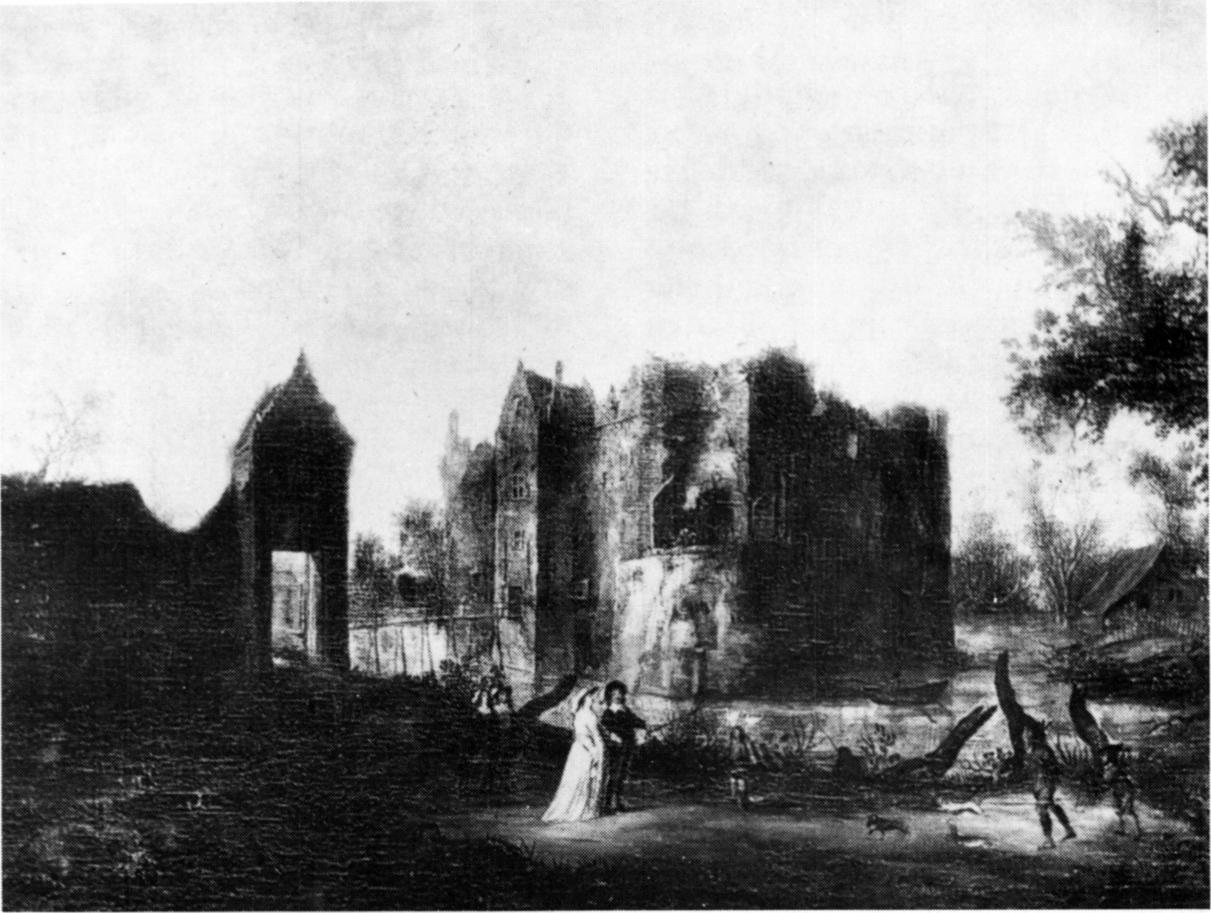
The castle's ruins in ca. 1625–1650

The castle was also occupied for a short time again in 1572, when the Spanish invaded the Netherlands. However, the castle was not held long by the Spanish, as Prince Willem Van Oranje and his troops were able to drive the Spanish troops out. This liberation of the castle kept the damage inflicted by the Spanish to a minimum. By 1590, the castle was fully repaired and it was once again almost destroyed, this time by a fire.

The lord of the castle at the time, Joris Van Arkel, died from injuries that he sustained during the fire.

=== 18th century–present ===
Due to a shortage of money, the Van Arkels were not able to rebuild the castle until the 17th century. This fire took place during the 80 years war and caused the family to have very uncertain feelings about its economic future. Therefore, it was not until the end of the 80 years war in the middle of the 17th century that large-scale renovations would start on the castle.

==== Architectural changes ====
Once the Van Arkels regained enough wealth to rebuild the castle the original architecture had become obsolete. As a result, the family made severe changes to the original layout of the castle. They restored the outside to essentially the same design as the original, but changed they inside considerably. Given how much architectural styles had changed since the castle was founded, is very surprising that the then lord, Thomas Walraven Van Arkel, chose to restore the outside with traditional medieval style. Given the changes in architectural styles, the interior of the castle was transformed to a much more comfortable living space. The original Castle had traditional, large rooms with high ceilings. Among these large rooms was the large knights hall. These sorts of rooms were very common in medieval castles. When the Van Arkels repaired the castle they got rid of the grand hall, elected to have numerous, smaller rooms instead.

In general, the renovations of the castle reduced the size of the rooms and made them shorter. Numerous fireplaces and other more modern amenities were included in the restorations. One of the few changes to the exterior of the castle was adding more windows. Because the original Castle was built primarily for defense, there were not many windows as they made the fortress more vulnerable during attacks.

==== French invasion ====
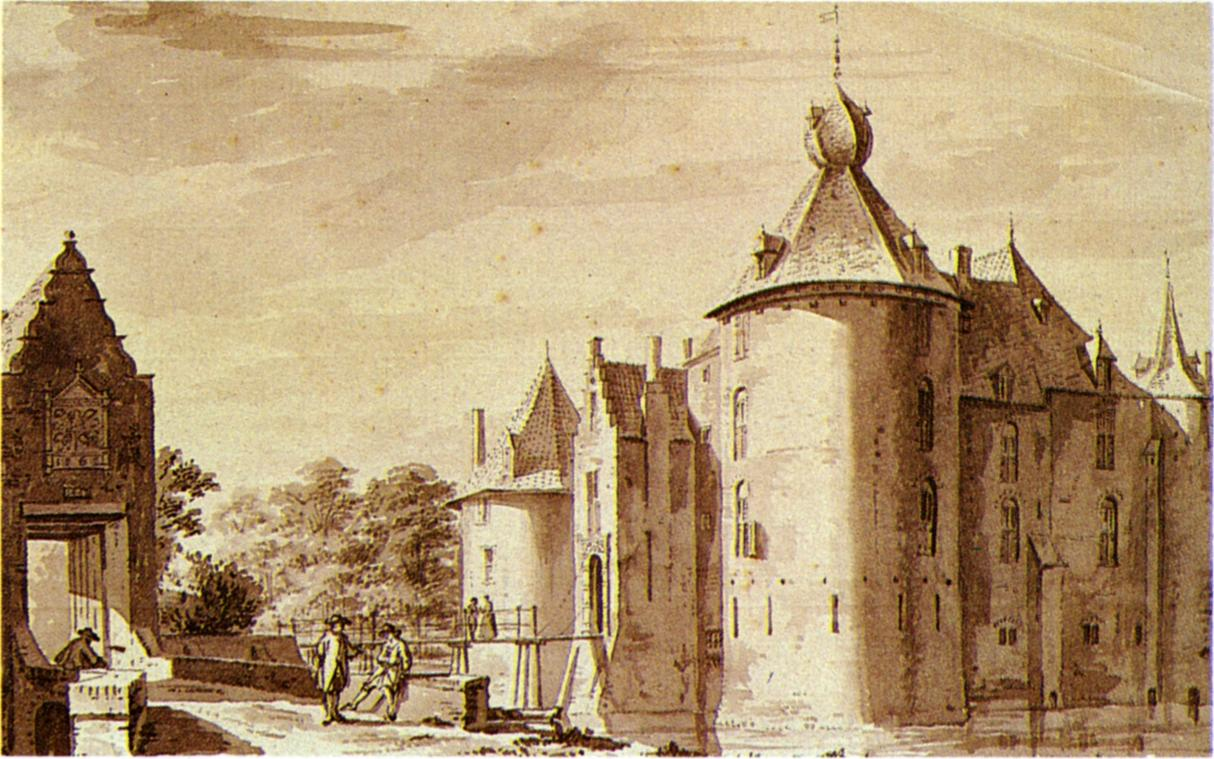
Ammersoyen Castle in 1734

Not long after the rebuilding was completed in mid-17th century, King Louis XIV of France invaded the Netherlands. This invasion was during the Franco-Dutch War, or the Dutch War as it is commonly referred to. This War was, in part, started in response to the Dutch signing an alliance with the Spanish and English against the French in the War of Devolution in the 1660s. King Louis XIV saw this as a betrayal from the Dutch and decided to invade the Dutch in response.

By the time the French soldiers arrived at the castle in 1672, the Van Arkels were able to regain some of their prior wealth. As the French made their way through the Dutch countryside, they destroyed numerous castles. The French soldiers also threatened to destroy the Ammersoyen Castle, but Thomas Van Arkel was able to buy the castle's safety from the French by offering the French commanding officer 7000 guilders. While this ensured the castle's safety, it left the Van Arkels in a severe amount of debt. This debt meant that the final interior redecorating under the Van Arkels could not be completed. In 1693, following the death of the last Van Arkels, Thomas, the castle came into the hands of a number of other Dutch families over the next century. The owners of the castle during this period were often very rich families who had various estates throughout the region and spent little time at the castle.

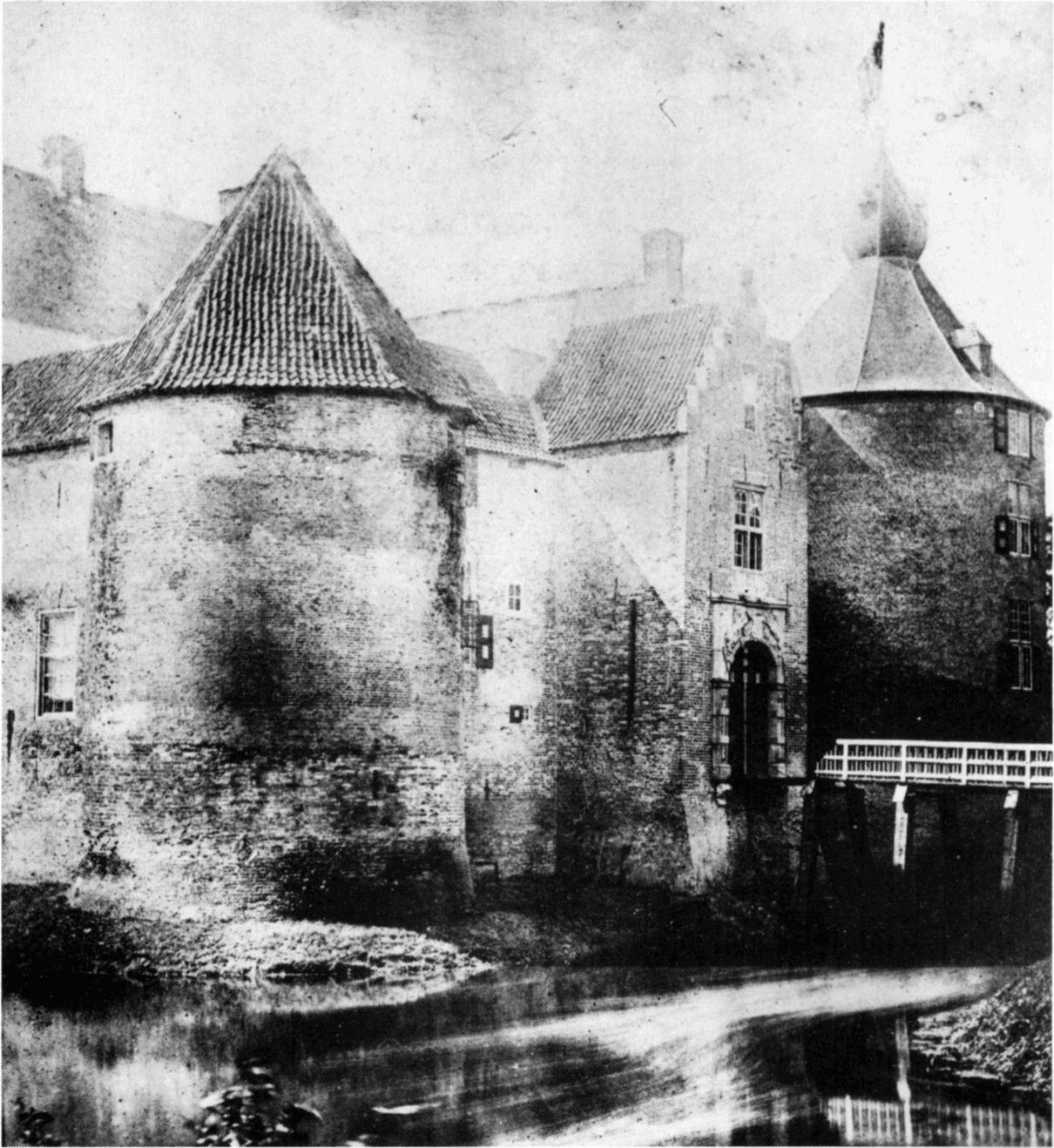
Ammersoyen Castle in ca. 1868

The last of the families to own the castle was the Woelmont family, in the mid-19th century. The last lord of Ammersoyen was Arthuer de Woelmont, who bought the castle in 1856. Over the course of the next 17 years, he eventually sold all of the possessions of the castle, and in 1873 he sold the castle to the Roman Catholic Church in Ammerzoden.

By 1876, the castle was transformed into a convent for use by the Poor Clares. The castle thus became the second Clarisse Convent in the Netherlands. The nuns made significant changes to the grounds when they lived in the castle. The moat was filled in and a chapel was built on the grounds, which is still there today. The start of World War II led to the end to the convent as the area was bombed heavily. Much of the castle and grounds were destroyed during the Allied bombings of WWII. The castle allowed the people of the town a place to seek shelter during the war, although by the end of the war, not much of the castle was left standing. After the war, a local businessman used the castle as a factory that produced washing machines.

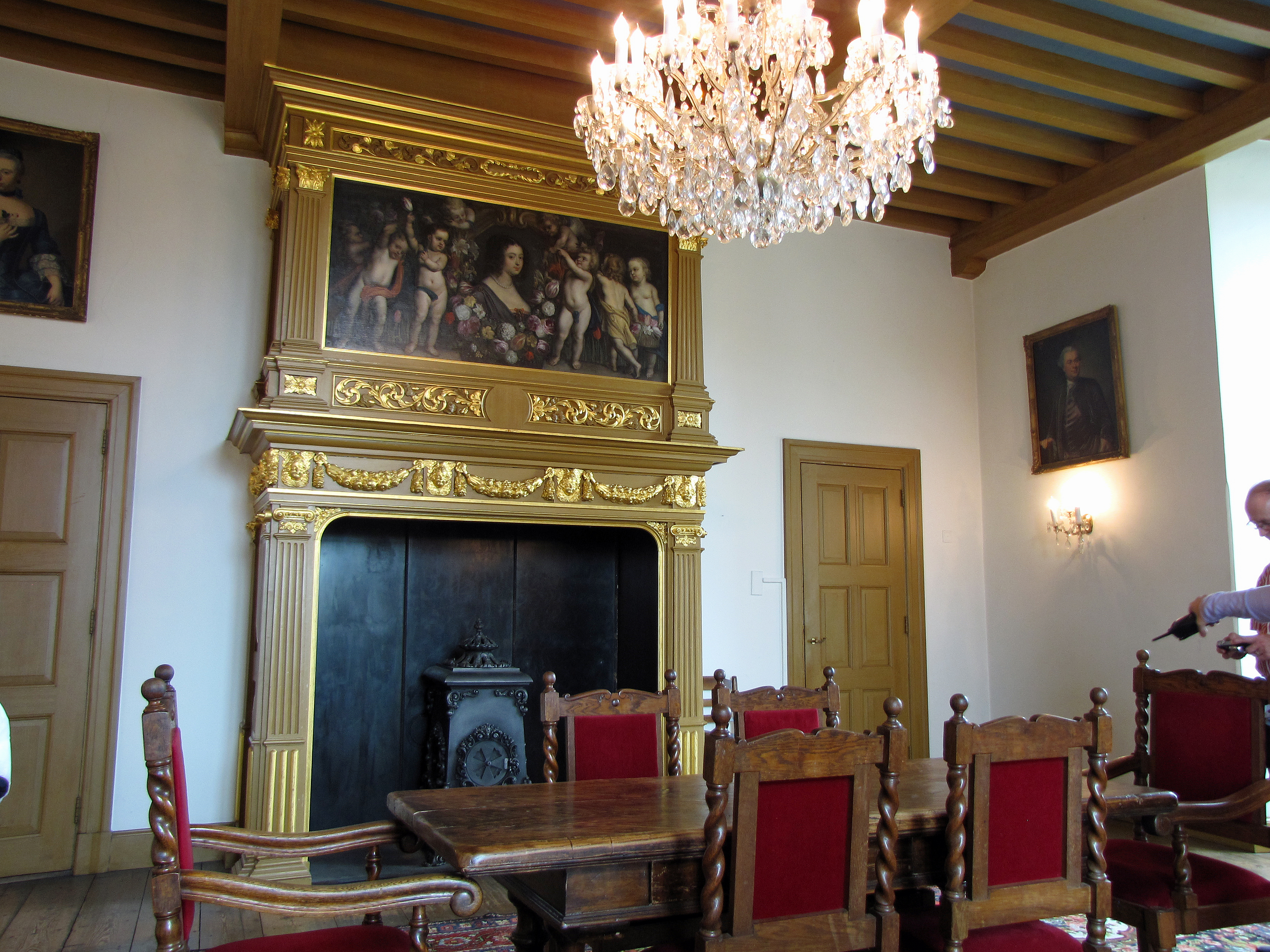
Room in the castle in 2011

In 1957, the Friends of Gelderland Castles Foundation bought the castle and made extensive repairs. Over the course of the next 16 years, they were able to restore the castle to its original medieval construction. This meant undoing many of the structural changes that have taken place over the centuries. While this sounds like a very difficult job, many of the changes that had taken place were actually just covered up by plaster and bricks. So recovering the original layout was actually not that taxing. They have restored the rooms to their original size and height, reconstructed chimneys, and moved staircases. The foundation was able to recover numerous artifacts from throughout the castle's history by digging up the filled in moat. Among the pieces found were fragments of pottery, stoneware, glass, silver, bronze, and tin. These artifacts are now on display in the castle's attic. The castle and grounds were fully restored by 1976, and today it is open to the public for tours and other functions. From 1976 until 1999 the castle was used not only as a tourist attraction, but also as an official town hall and meeting place for the local municipality. After the Ammerzoden municipality ceased to exist in 1999, the meetings were moved from the castle.

== See also ==
- List of castles in the Netherlands
