= Californië, Gelderland =

Californië
- Hamlet
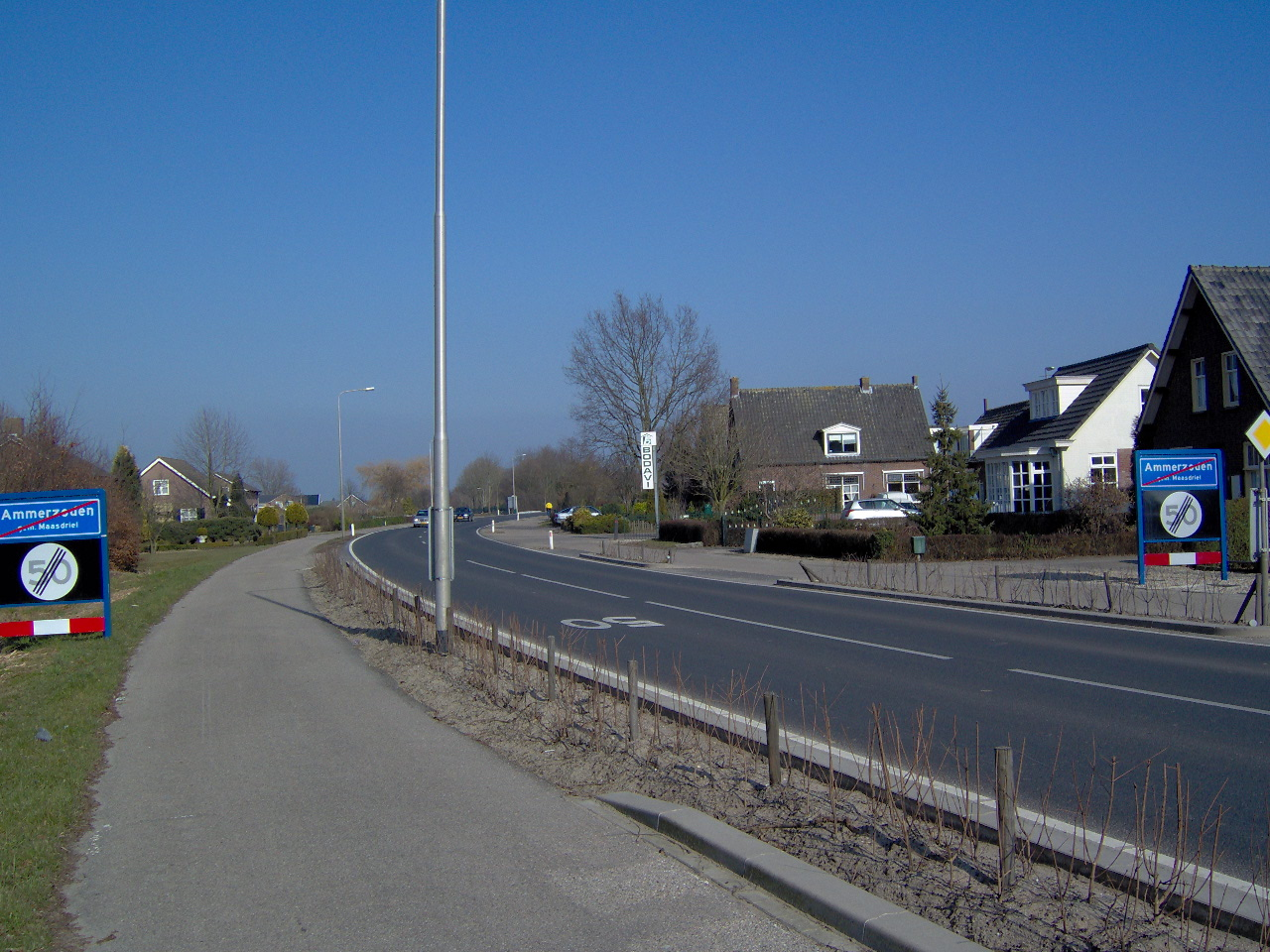
- Looking towards Californië

- Location in the Netherlands Californië (Netherlands)
- Coordinates: 51°44′56″N 5°14′18″E
- Country: Netherlands
- Province: Gelderland
- Municipality: Maasdriel
- Elevation: 3 m (9.8 ft)
- Time zone: UTC+1 (CET)
  - Summer (DST): UTC+2 (CEST)
- Postal code: 5321 & 5324
- Dialing code: 073

Californië (Dutch for California) is a hamlet in the Dutch province of Gelderland. It is located in the municipality of Maasdriel, between the villages Ammerzoden and Hedel.

It was first mentioned in 1867 as Californië, and is a reference to an inn which existed after 1852. In 1945, the hamlet was named after the inn. It is not a statistical entity, and the postal authorities have split it in Ammerzoden and Hedel. In February 2022, the hamlet received place name signs. It consists of about 25 houses.
