= Velddriel =

- Village
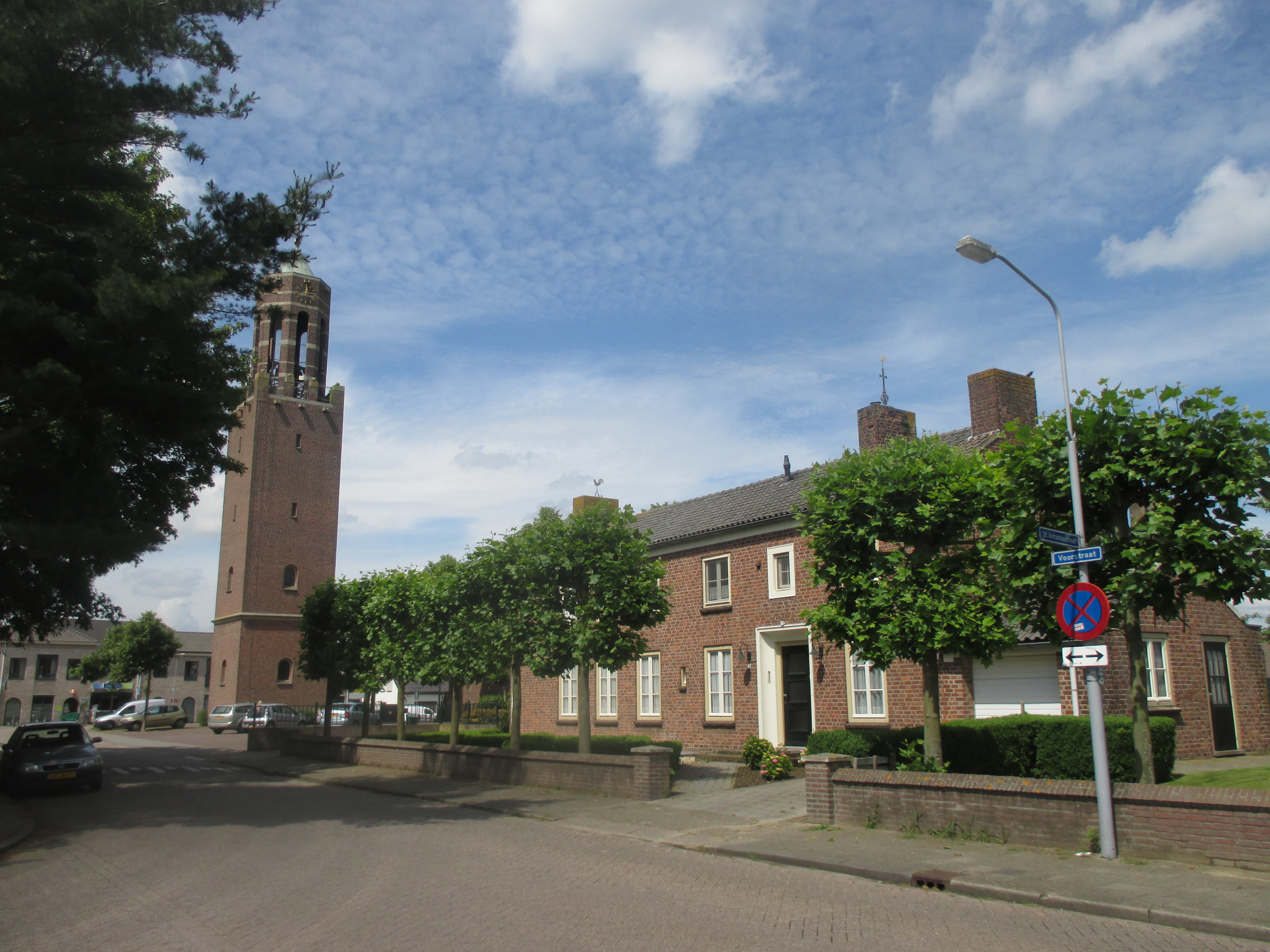
- St Martinus Church

- Location in the Netherlands Velddriel (Netherlands)
- Coordinates: 51.7691°N 5.3058°E
- Country: Netherlands
- Province: Gelderland
- Municipality: Maasdriel

Area
  - Total: 7.75 km^{2} (2.99 sq mi)
- Elevation: 4 m (13 ft)

Population (2021)
  - Total: 1,400
  - Density: 180/km^{2} (470/sq mi)
- Time zone: UTC+1 (CET)
  - Summer (DST): UTC+2 (CEST)
- Postal code: 5334
- Dialing code: 0418

Velddriel is a village in the Dutch province of Gelderland. The village is a part of the municipality of Maasdriel, and lies about 8 km north of 's-Hertogenbosch.

It was first mentioned in 996 as Thrile. The veld (field) was later added to distinguish from Kerkdriel (church). In 1840, it was home to 422 people. The St. Martinus Church was built in 1858 and destroyed in 1944. In 1953, a new church was completed.

== Gallery ==
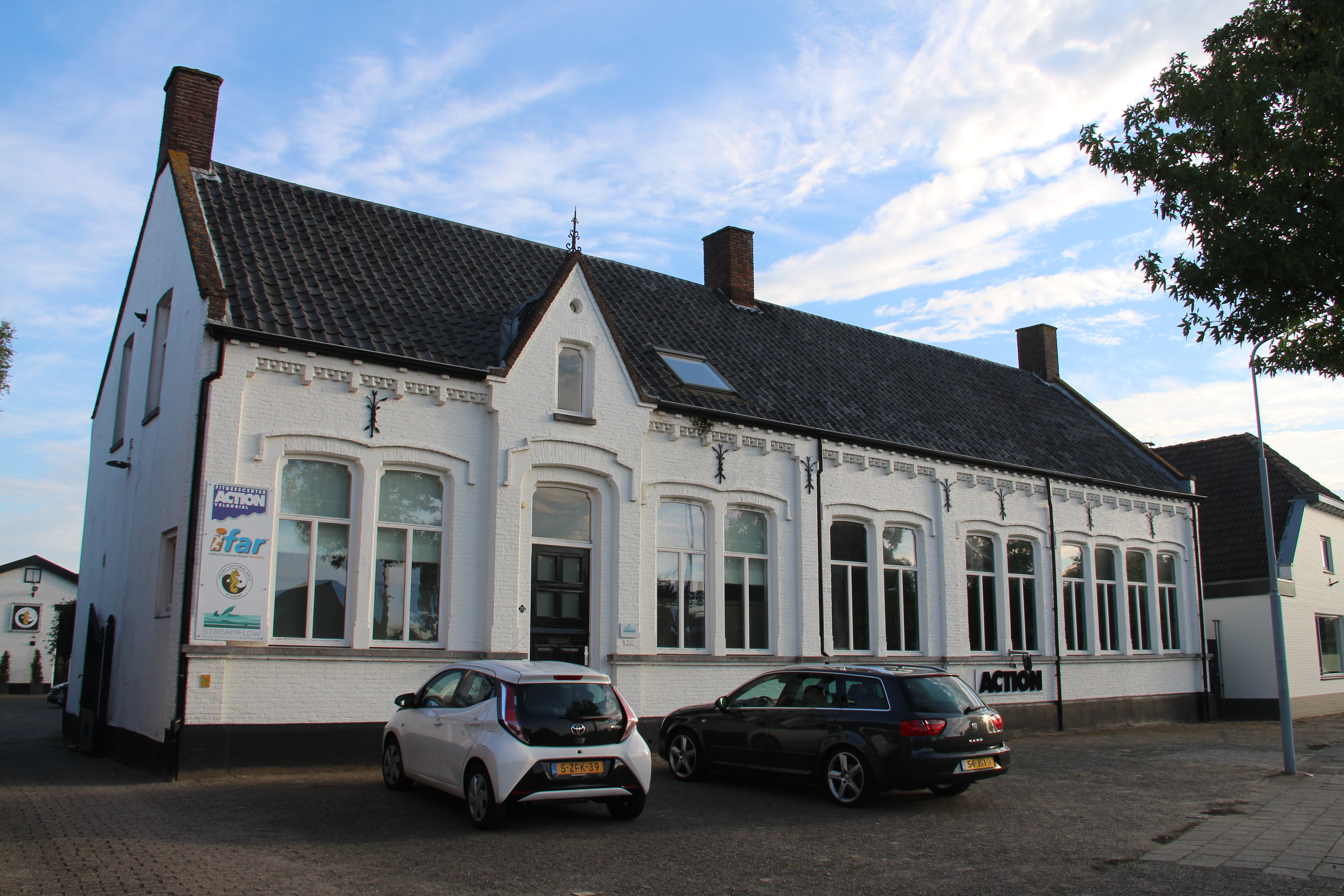
Former school

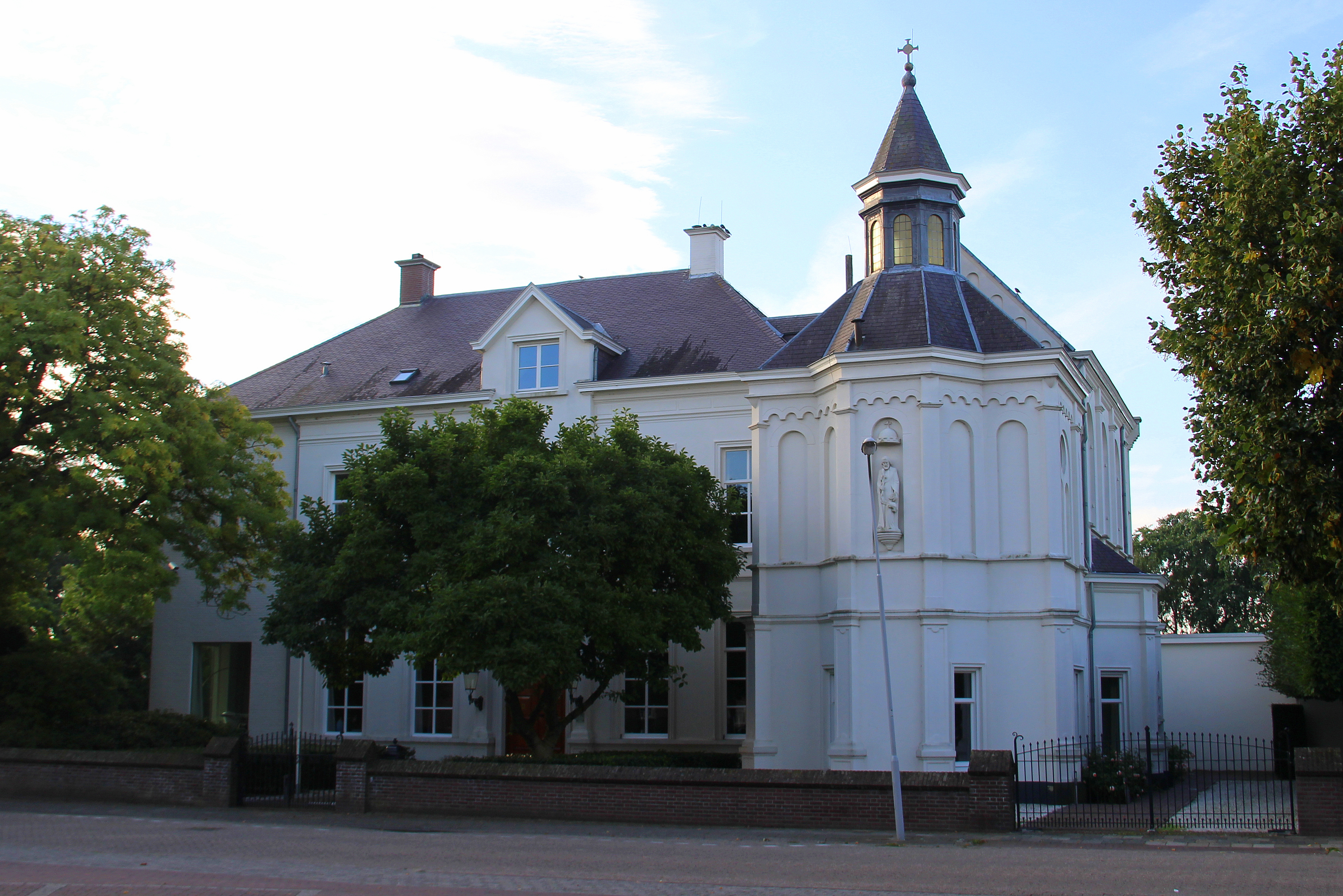
Former monastery
