= Hurwenen =

- Village
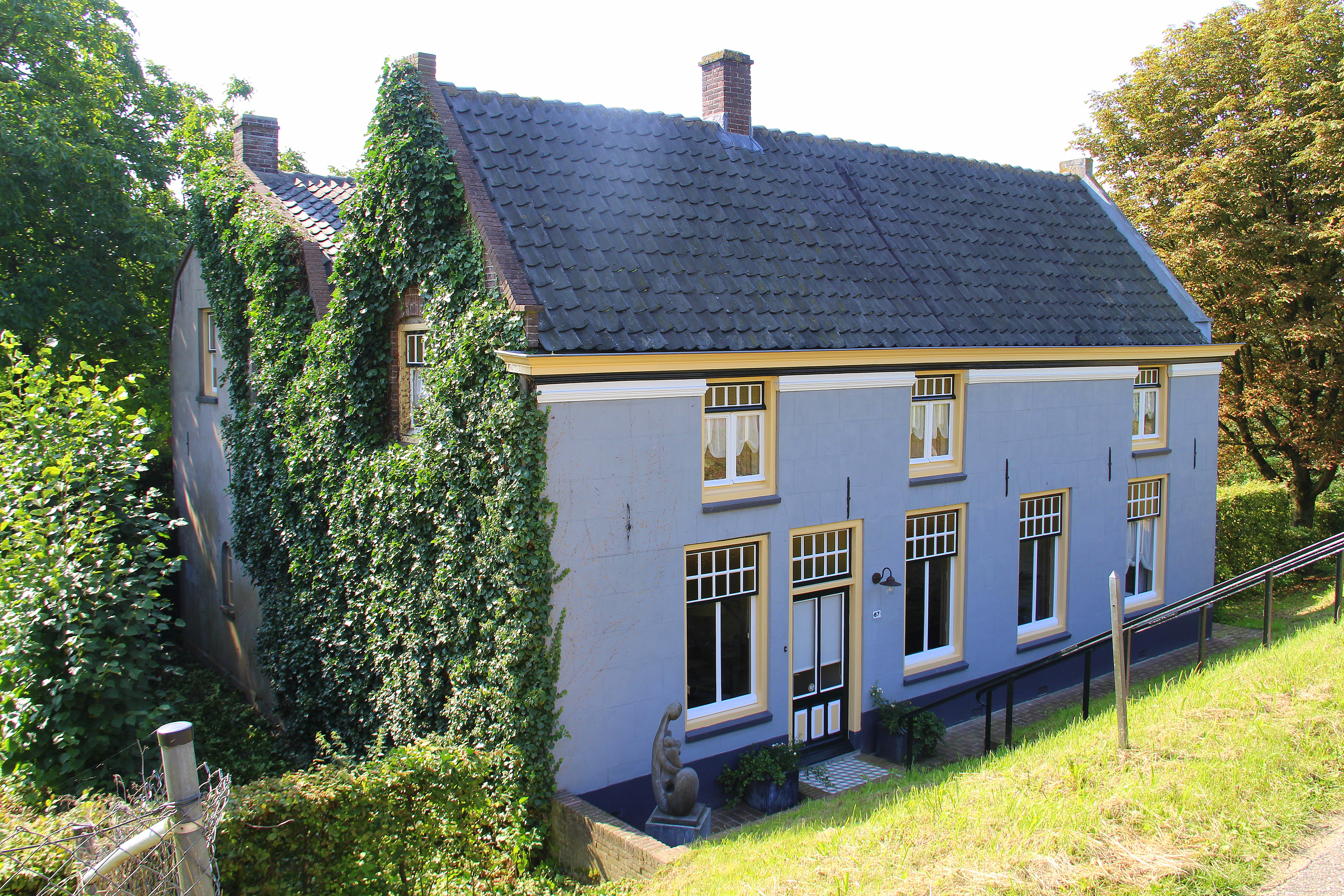
- House on the dike

- Flag Coat of arms

- Location in the Netherlands Hurwenen (Netherlands)
- Coordinates: 51°48′38″N 5°19′4″E
- Country: Netherlands
- Province: Gelderland
- Municipality: Maasdriel

Area
  - Total: 11.50 km^{2} (4.44 sq mi)
- Elevation: 5 m (16 ft)

Population (2021)
  - Total: 1,410
  - Density: 123/km^{2} (318/sq mi)
- Time zone: UTC+1 (CET)
  - Summer (DST): UTC+2 (CEST)
- Postal code: 5327 & 5328
- Dialing code: 0418

Hurwenen is a village in the Dutch province of Gelderland. It is a part of the municipality of Maasdriel, and lies about 11 km southwest of Tiel. Thijs Straver is the mayor of Hurwenen.

Hurwenen was a separate municipality until 1955, when it was merged with Rossum, except for a short period between 1818 and 1821, when it was also a part of Rossum.

== History ==
It was first mentioned in 1244 as de Huerwen. The etymology is unclear. Just before 1600, Hurwenen became a battlefield in the Dutch Revolt and the village was destroyed. About 40 years later, the area was resettled. In 1840, it was home to 398 people. Around 1850, a brickworks was established in the village. During World War II, a V-1 flying bomb hits Hurwenen killing 9 people and destroying the church.

Vento Vivimus is a windmill which was built in 1875 and translates to "we live of the wind". It was damaged during World War II. In 1988, a large restoration commenced, and since 1991, Vento Vivimus is able to function as a grist mill again.

== Gallery ==
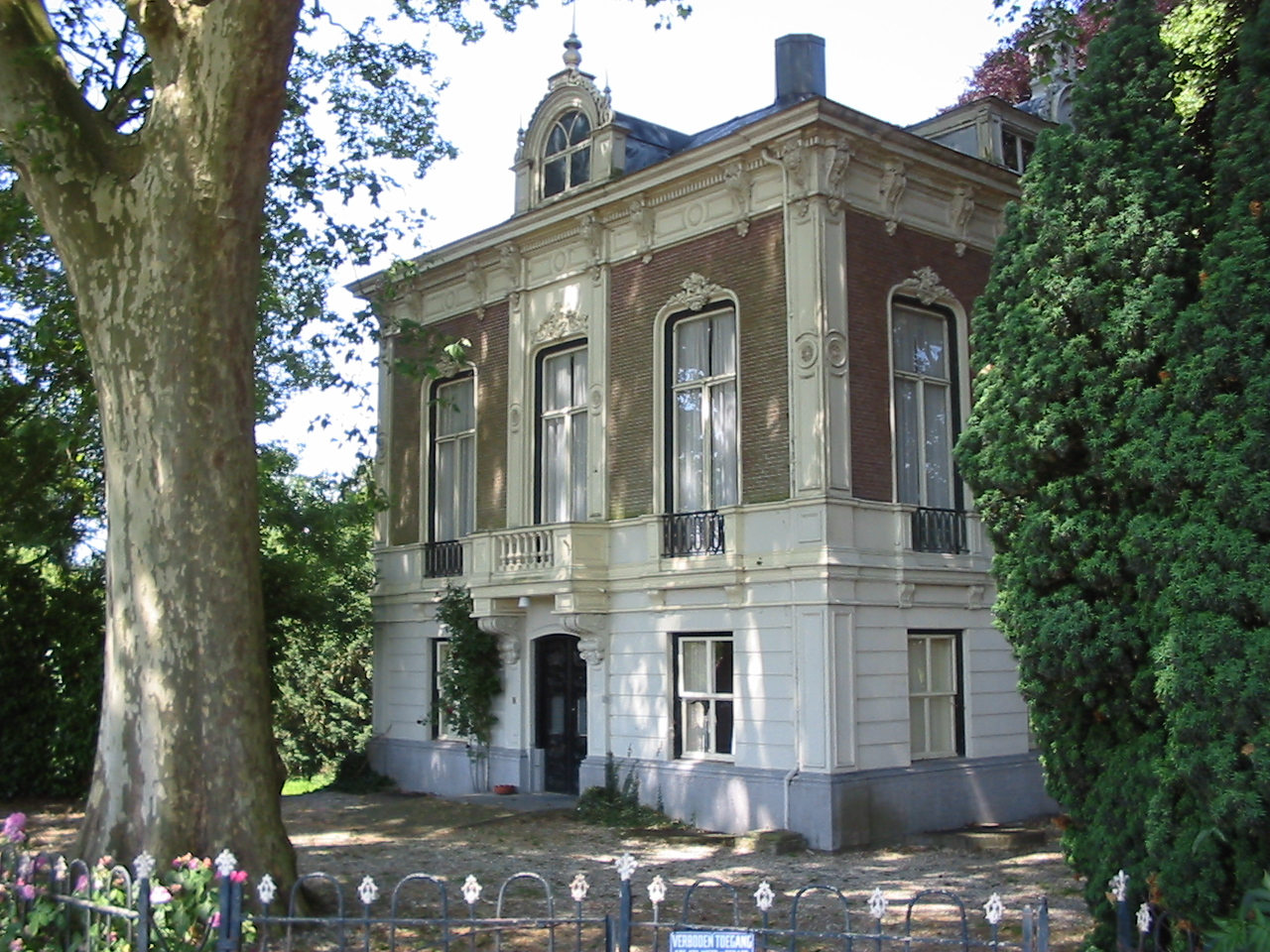
Villa Ouderzorg

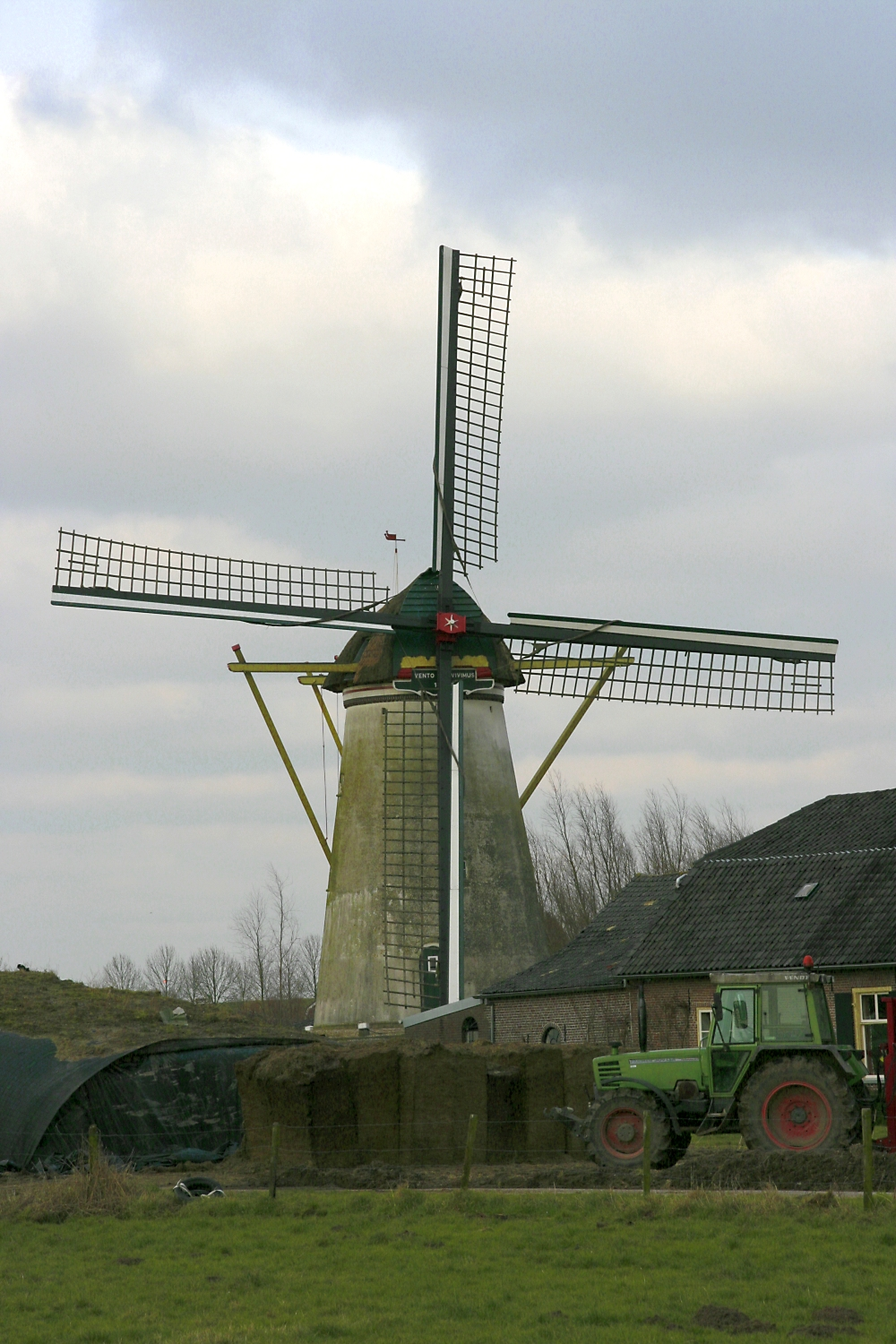
Windmill Vento Vivimus

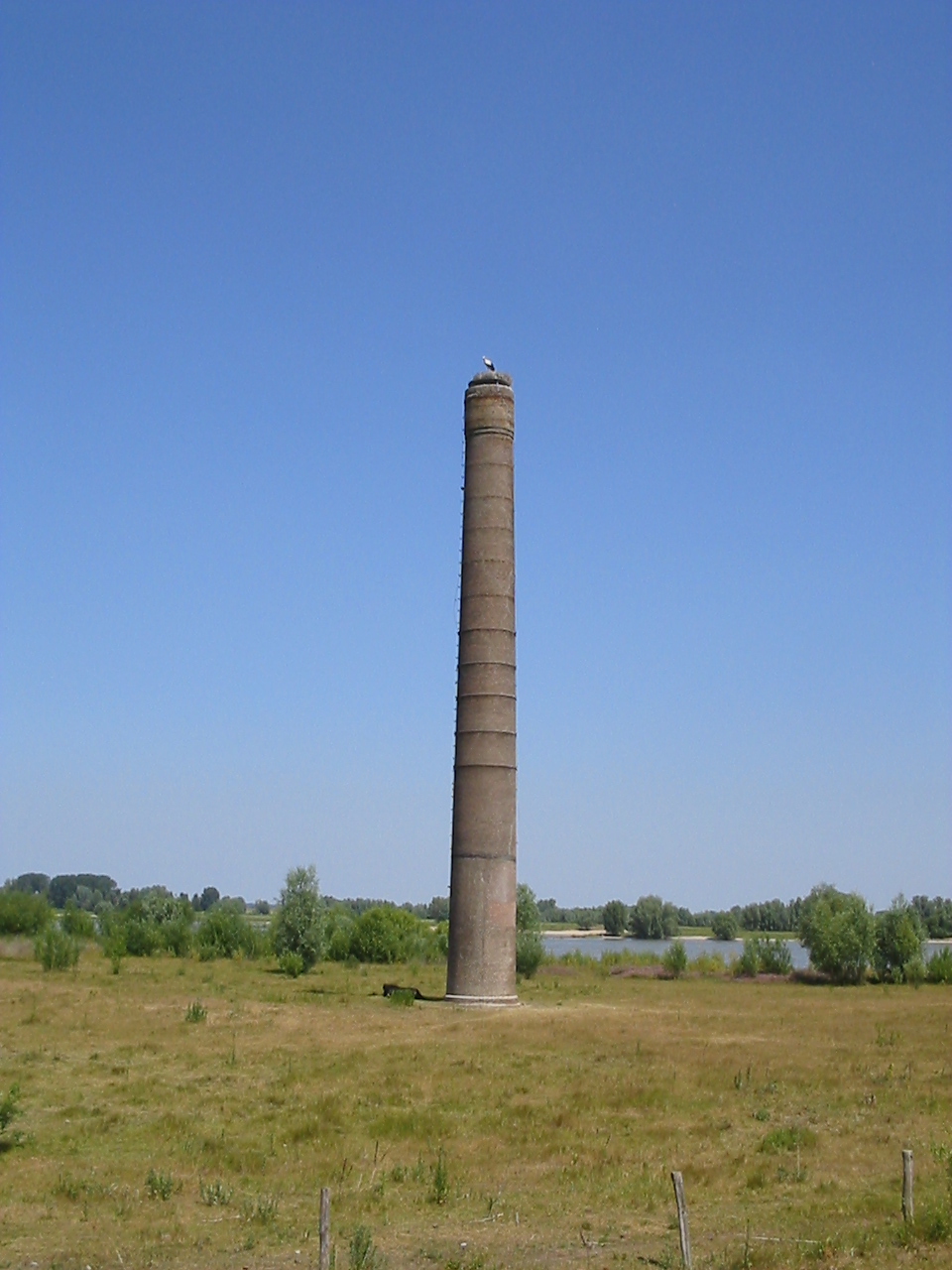
Chimney of the former brickworks

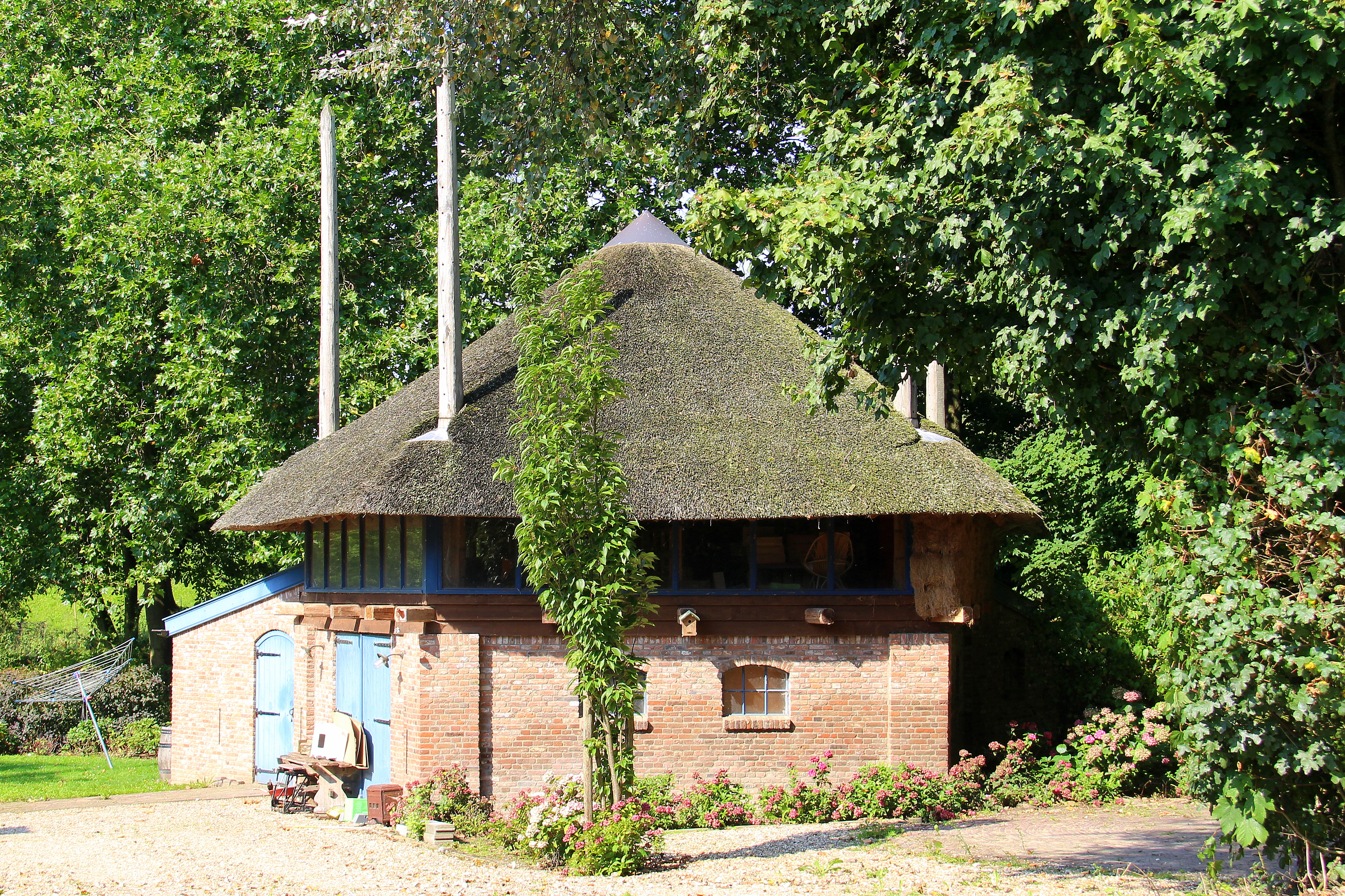
Hay stack
