= Well, Gelderland =

Well
- Village
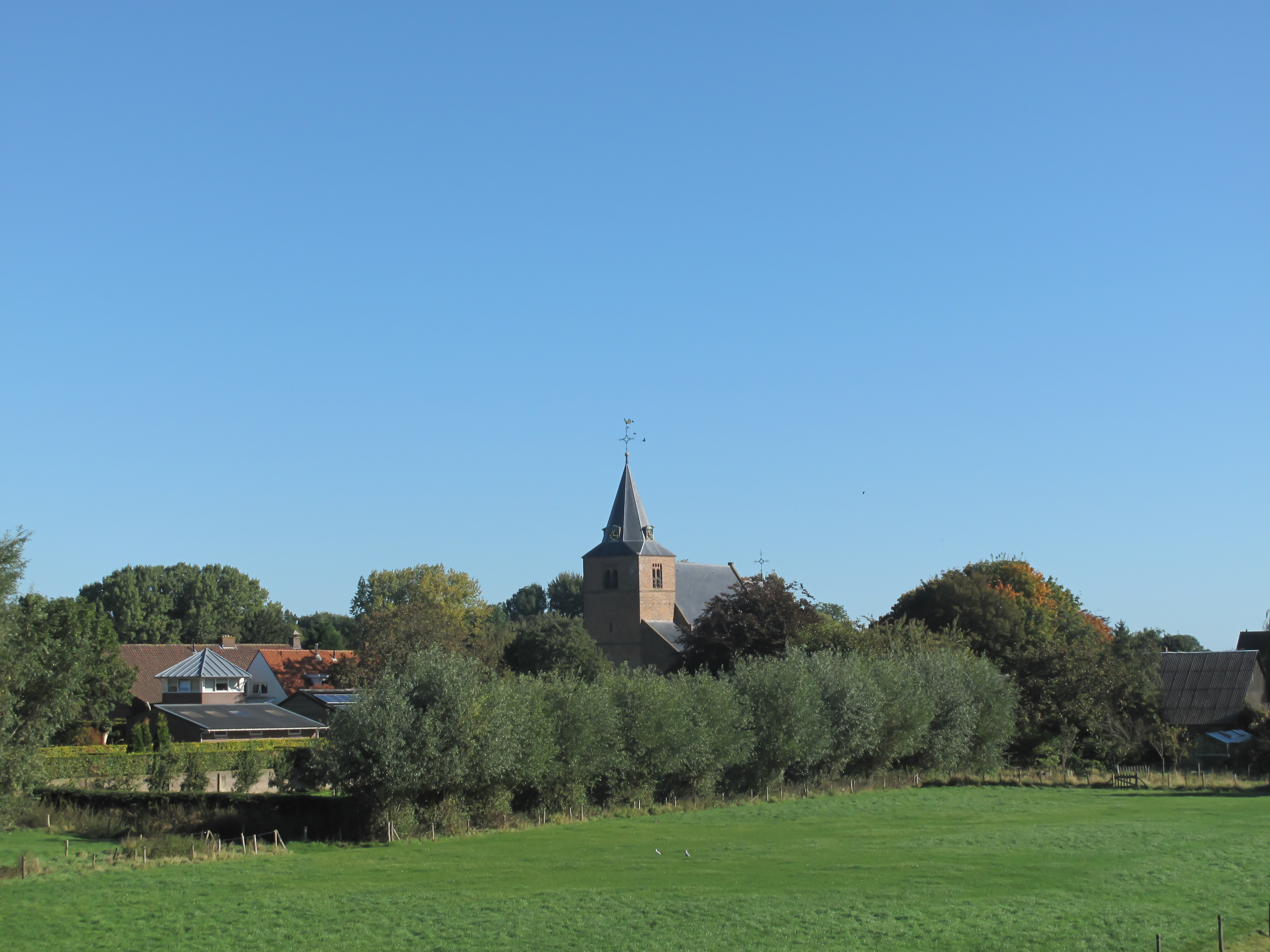

- Location in the Netherlands Well (Netherlands)
- Coordinates: 51.7438°N 5.2033°E
- Country: Netherlands
- Province: Gelderland
- Municipality: Maasdriel

Area
  - Total: 0.36 km^{2} (0.14 sq mi)
- Elevation: 3 m (9.8 ft)

Population (2021)
  - Total: 520
  - Density: 1,400/km^{2} (3,700/sq mi)
- Time zone: UTC+1 (CET)
  - Summer (DST): UTC+2 (CEST)
- Postal code: 5325
- Dialing code: 073

Well is a village in the Dutch province of Gelderland. It is a part of the municipality of Maasdriel, and lies about 9 km northwest of 's-Hertogenbosch.

== History ==
It was first mentioned in the 10th or 11th century as Vualli, and means well. Well developed on an artificial mound and was originally a linear settlement along the road. Later it became more concentrated. The tower of the Dutch Reformed Church dates from the 12th century. The church itself dates from the 16th century. Castle Well probably dates from the 14th century. The tower was remodelled in the 16th century. In 1672, it was heavily damaged by the French. In 1884, the castle was extended. In 1840, Well was home to 843 people.

== Gallery ==
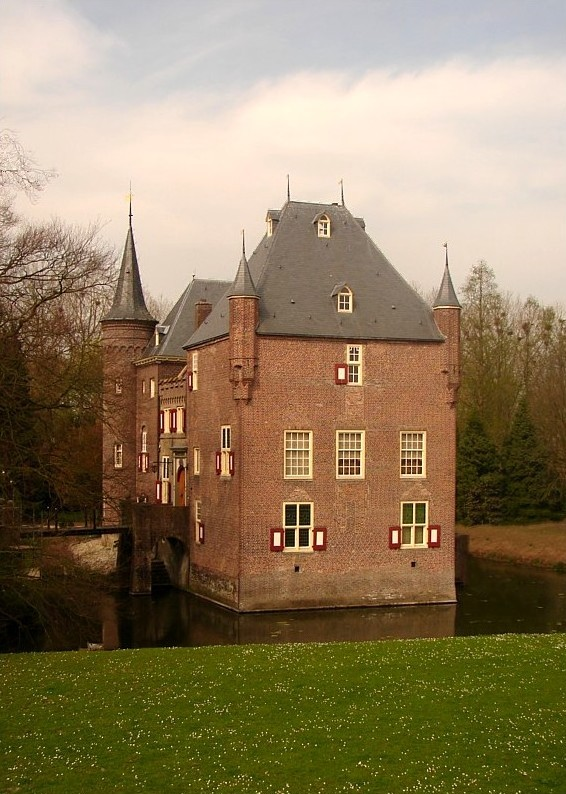
Castle Well

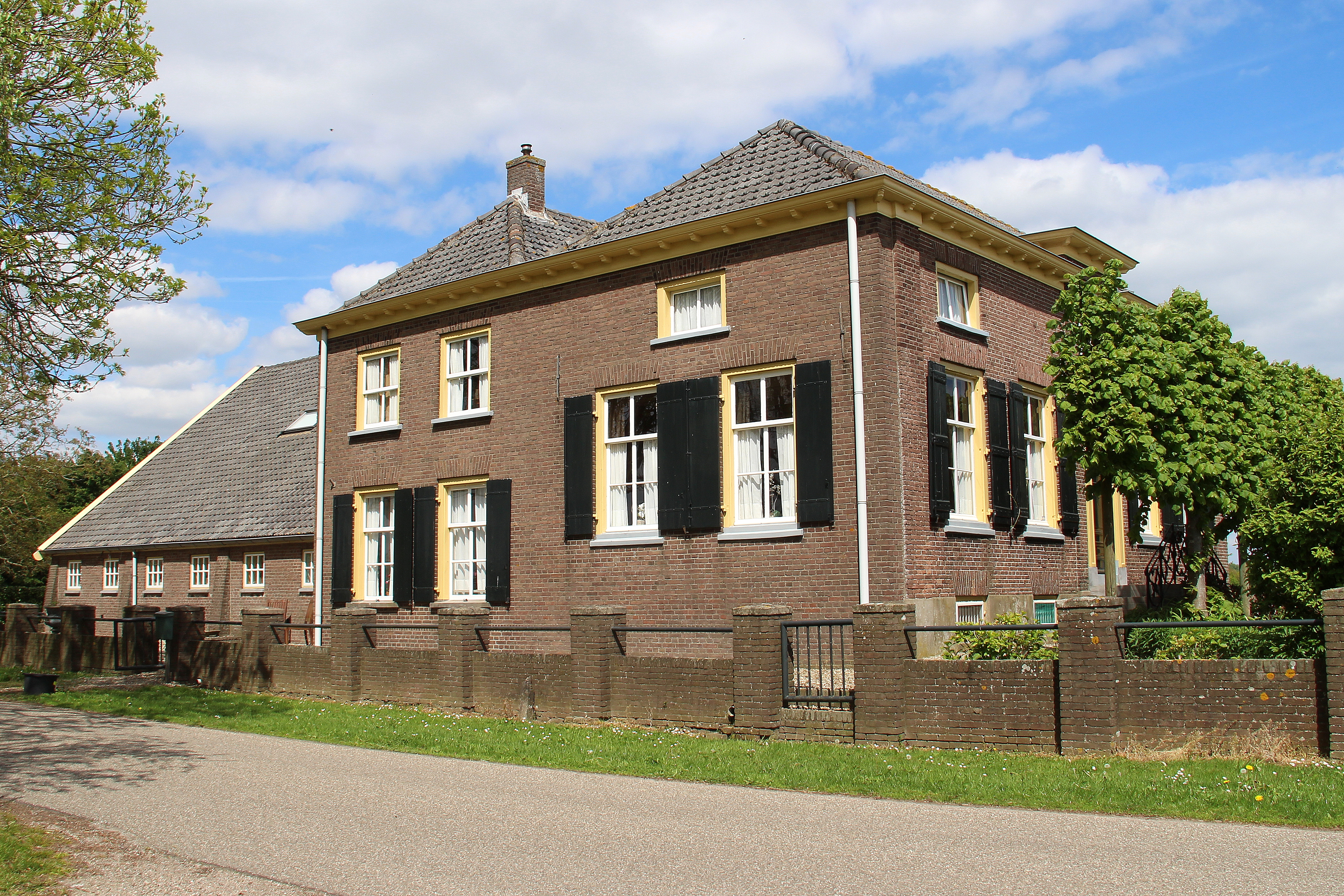
Farm in Well

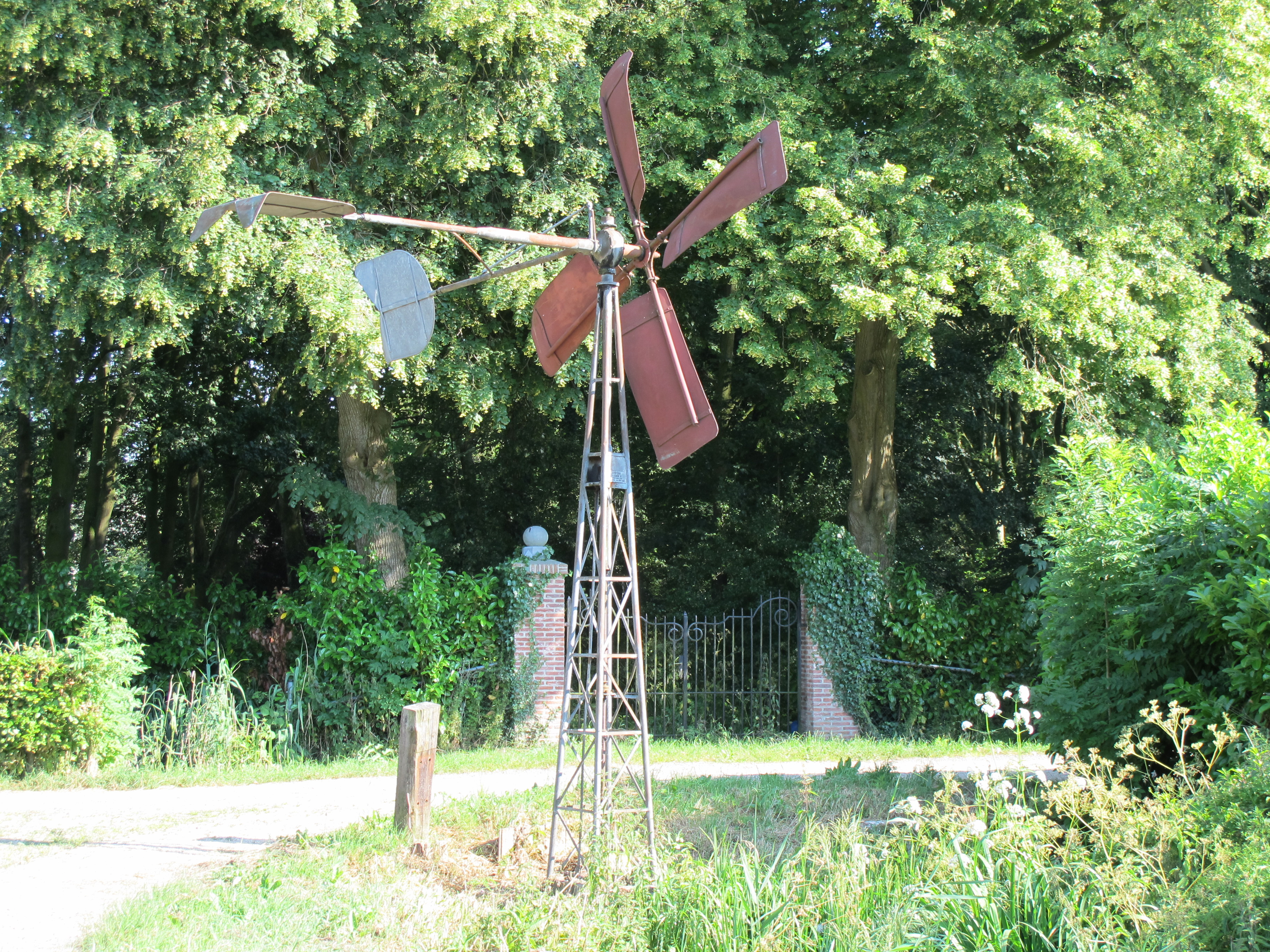
Little wind mill
