= Hoenzadriel =

- Village
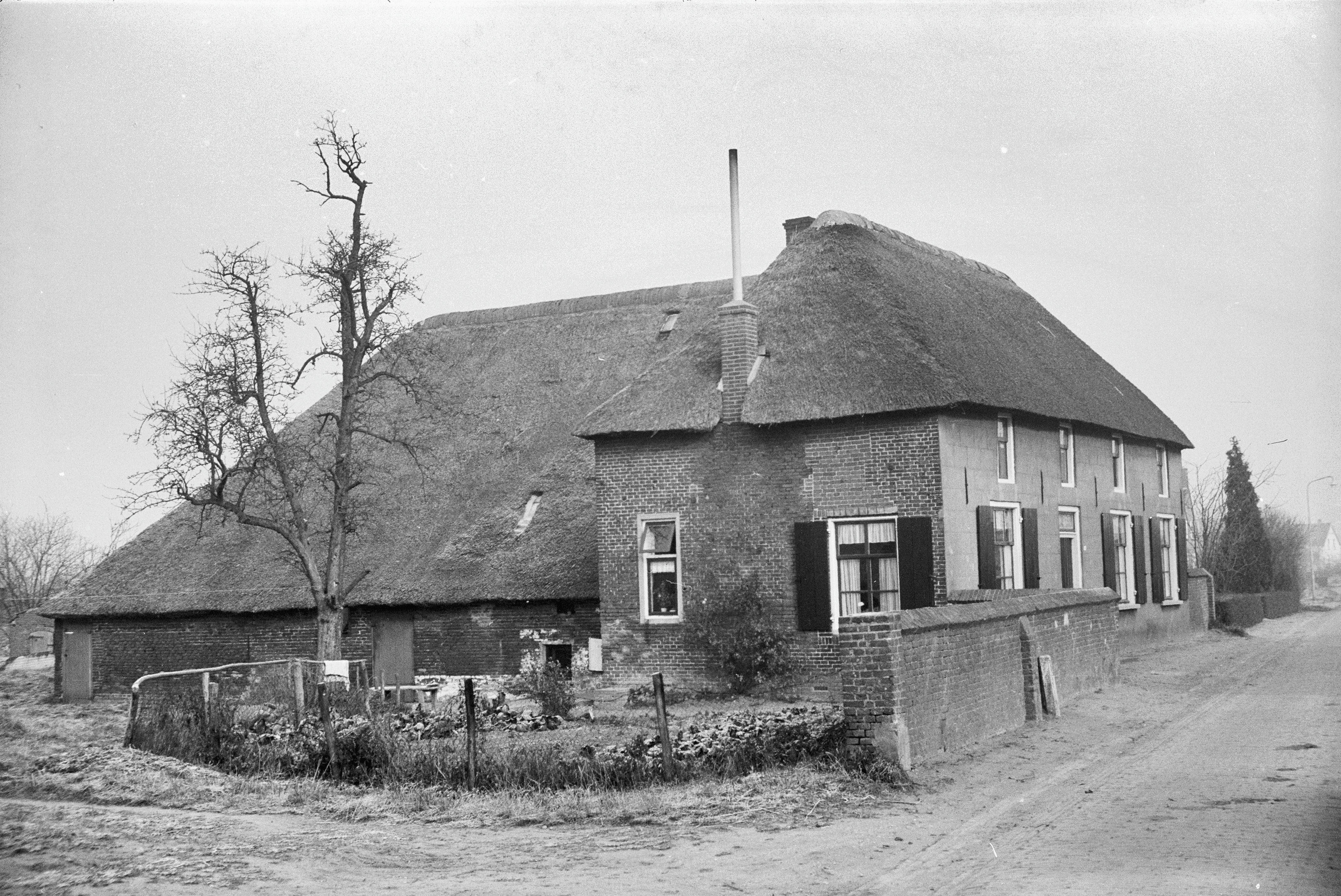
- Farm in Hoenzadriel

- Location in the Netherlands Hoenzadriel (Netherlands)
- Coordinates: 51.7543°N 5.3294°E
- Country: Netherlands
- Province: Gelderland
- Municipality: Maasdriel

Area
  - Total: 0.60 km^{2} (0.23 sq mi)
- Elevation: 4 m (13 ft)

Population (2021)
  - Total: 210
  - Density: 350/km^{2} (910/sq mi)
- Time zone: UTC+1 (CET)
  - Summer (DST): UTC+2 (CEST)
- Postal code: 5333
- Dialing code: 0418

Hoenzadriel is a village in the Dutch province of Gelderland. It is a part of the municipality of Maasdriel and lies about 6 km north of 's-Hertogenbosch.

It was first mentioned in 722 as Hunsetti. The etymology is unclear. In 1840, it was home to 396 people. In 1939, the Dutch Reformed Church was built. The church was built by the Roman Catholics, because they wanted to use the reformed church in Den Bosch and offered a church to Hoenzadriel in return. In 1975, the church was decommissioned and is now a residential home.
