= Maasdriel =

- Municipality
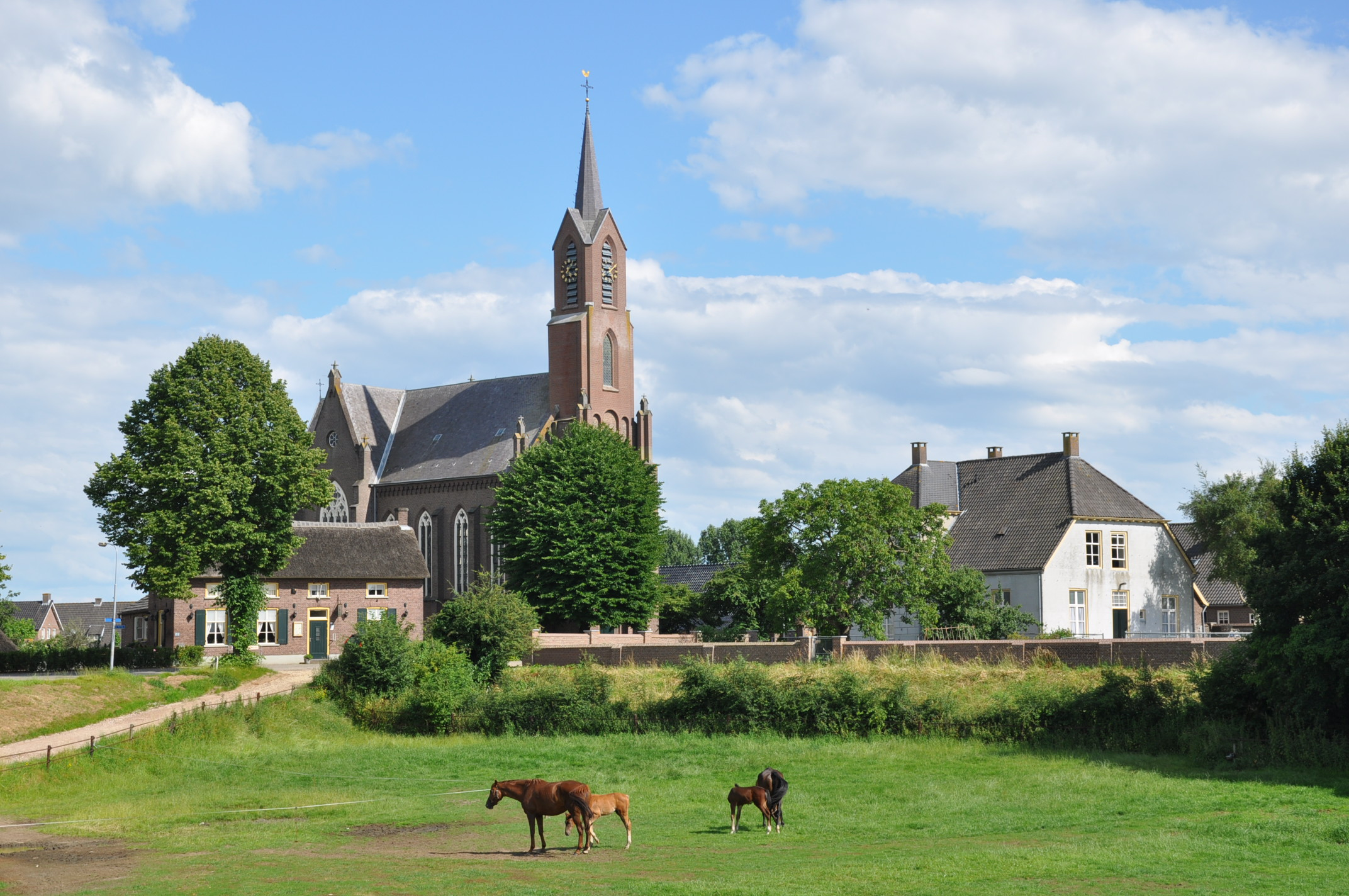
- Church in Alem

- Flag Coat of arms

- Location in Gelderland
- Coordinates: 51°46′N 5°20′E
- Country: Netherlands
- Province: Gelderland

Government
  - Body: Municipal council
  - Mayor: Antoine Walraven (VVD)

Area
  - Total: 75.46 km^{2} (29.14 sq mi)
  - Land: 66.11 km^{2} (25.53 sq mi)
  - Water: 9.35 km^{2} (3.61 sq mi)
- Elevation: 4 m (13 ft)

Population (January 2021)
  - Total: 25,452
  - Density: 385/km^{2} (1,000/sq mi)
- Time zone: UTC+1 (CET)
  - Summer (DST): UTC+2 (CEST)
- Postcode: 5320–5335, 6624
- Area code: 0418, 0487, 073
- Website: www.maasdriel.nl

Maasdriel (Dutch pronunciation: [maːzˈdril]) is a municipality in the province of Gelderland, in the eastern Netherlands.

Maasdriel was formed on 1 January, 1999 by the merger of the former municipalities of Ammerzoden (including Well, Wellseind en Wordragen), Hedel, Heerewaarden, Maasdriel (Alem, Hoenzadriel, Kerkdriel and Velddriel) and Rossum (including Hurwenen). The former municipality of Maasdriel was called "Driel" before 1944.

== Populated places ==
- Alem
- Ammerzoden
- Californië
- Hedel
- Heerewaarden
- Hoenzadriel
- Hurwenen
- Kerkdriel
- Rossum
- Velddriel
- Well
- Wellseind
- Wordragen

=== Topography ===
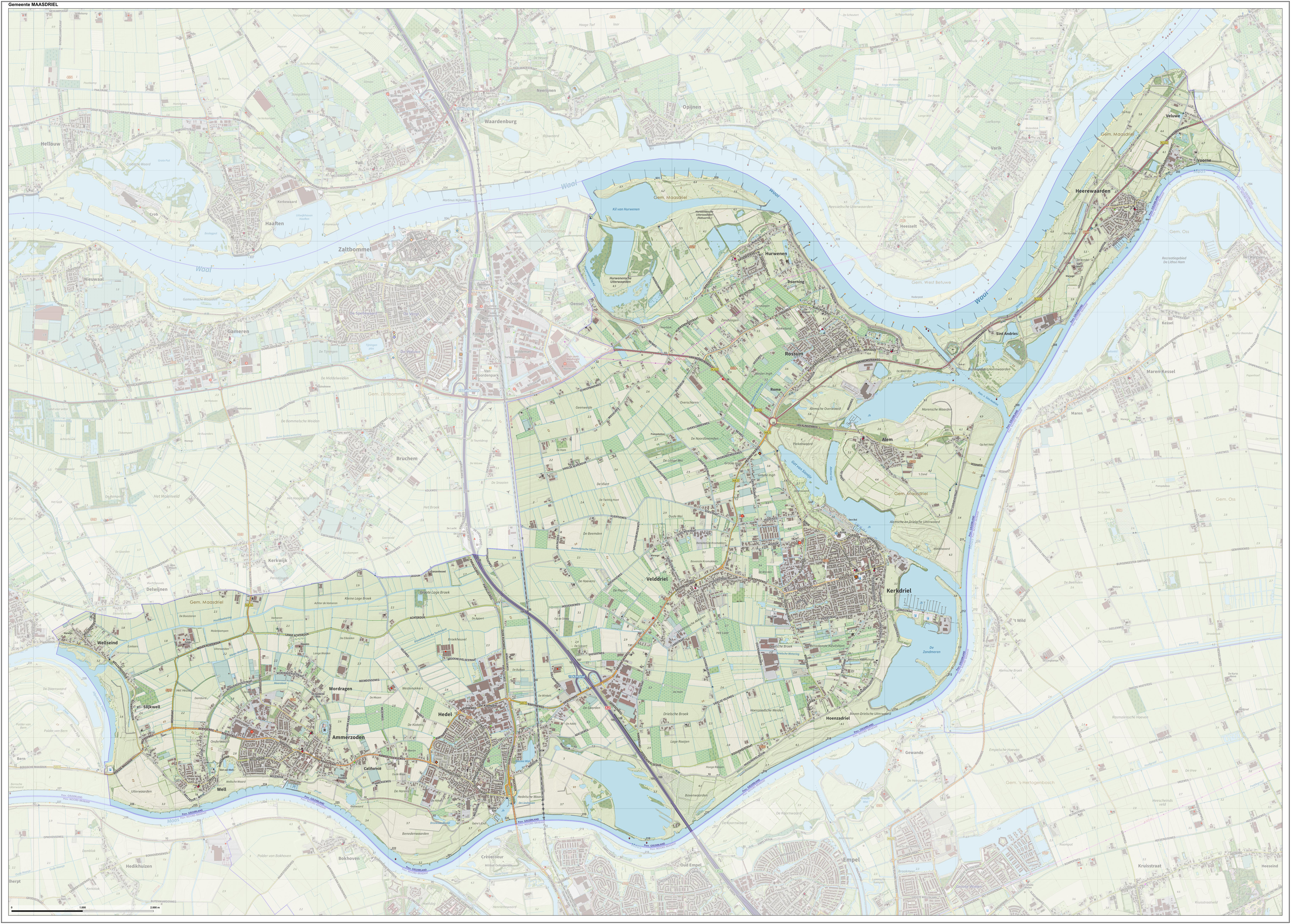

Map of the municipality of Maasdriel, June 2015

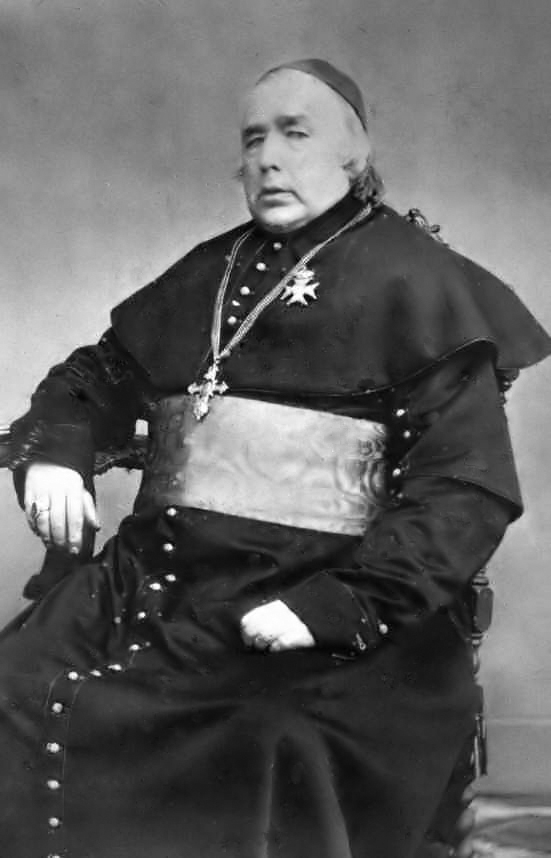
Joannes Zwijsen

== Notable people ==
- Johannes Zwijsen (1794 in Kerkdriel – 1877) Roman Catholic Archbishop of Utrecht
- Jacobus Groenendaal (1805 in Heerewaarden – 1860) a South African statesman
- Johannes Hubertus Leonardus de Haas (1832 in Hedel – 1908) an animal and landscape painter of the Hague School
- Hendrik van der Veen (1888 in Rossum – 1977) a missionary worker and linguist who worked in Tana Toraja, Dutch East Indies.
- Thijs de Graauw (1942 in Kerkdriel – 2026) an astronomer
- Boet van Dulmen (1948 in Ammerzoden – 2021) a Grand Prix motorcycle road racer

== Gallery ==
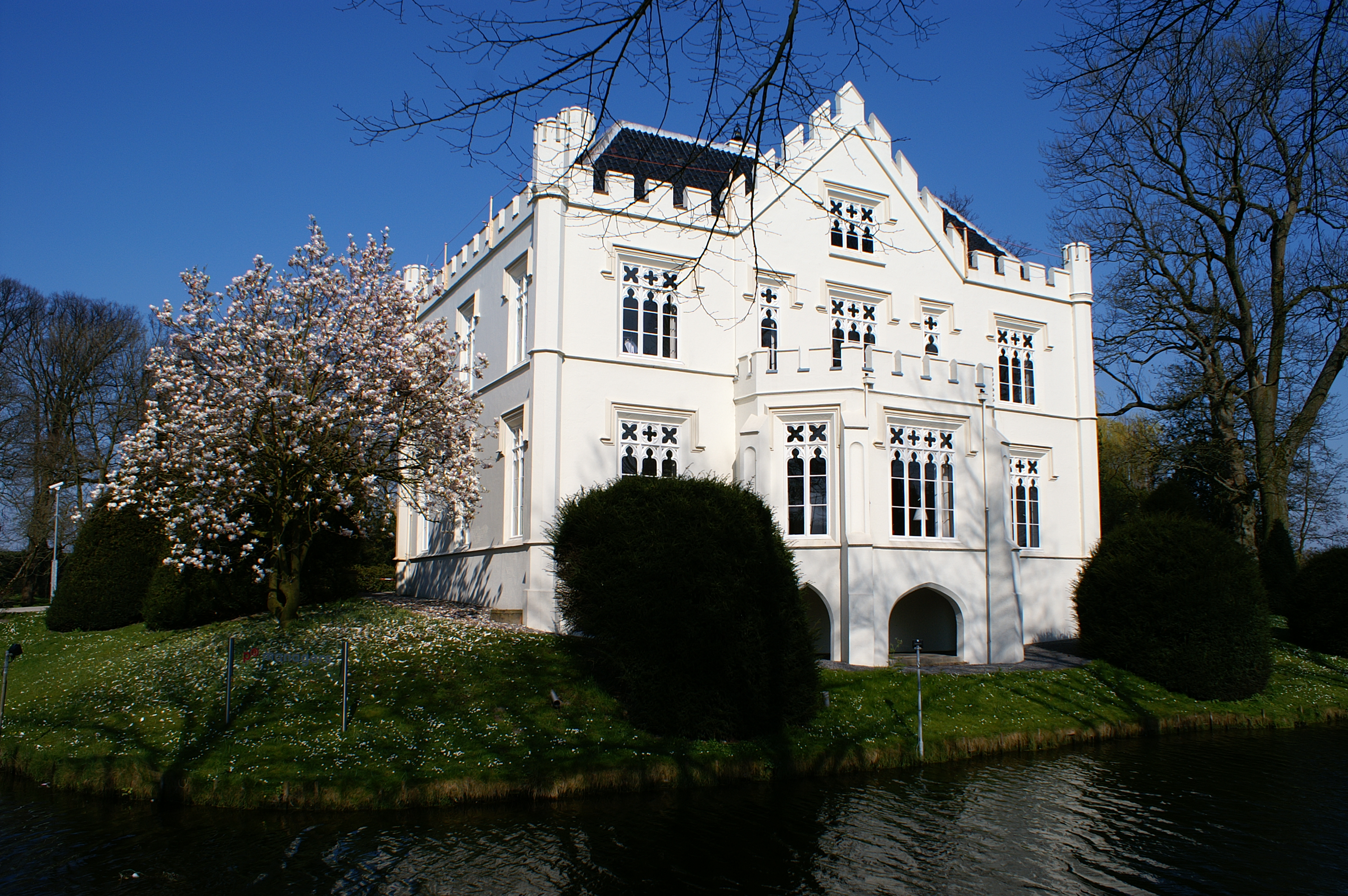
"Castle" Rossum

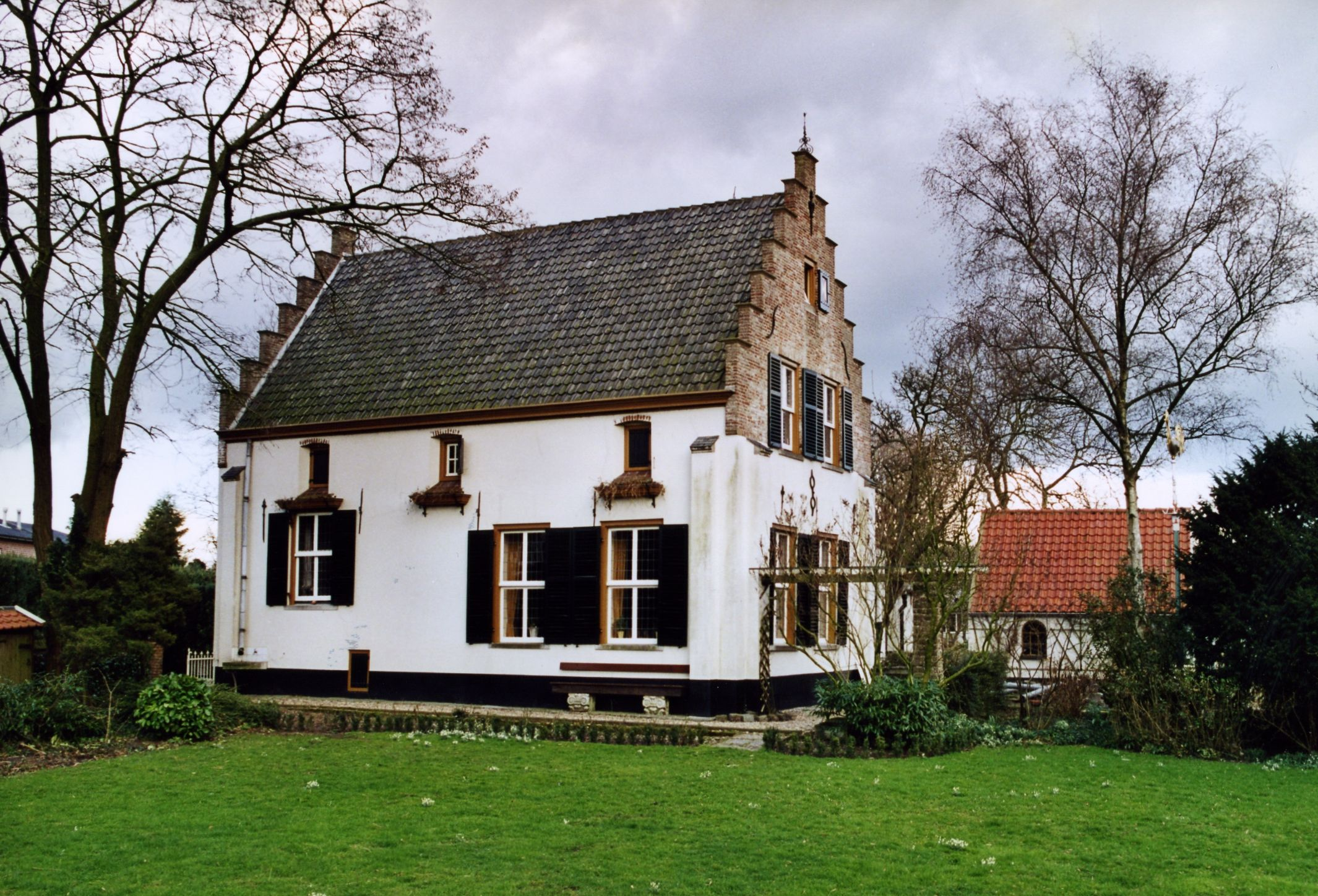
Teisterbant in Kerkdriel

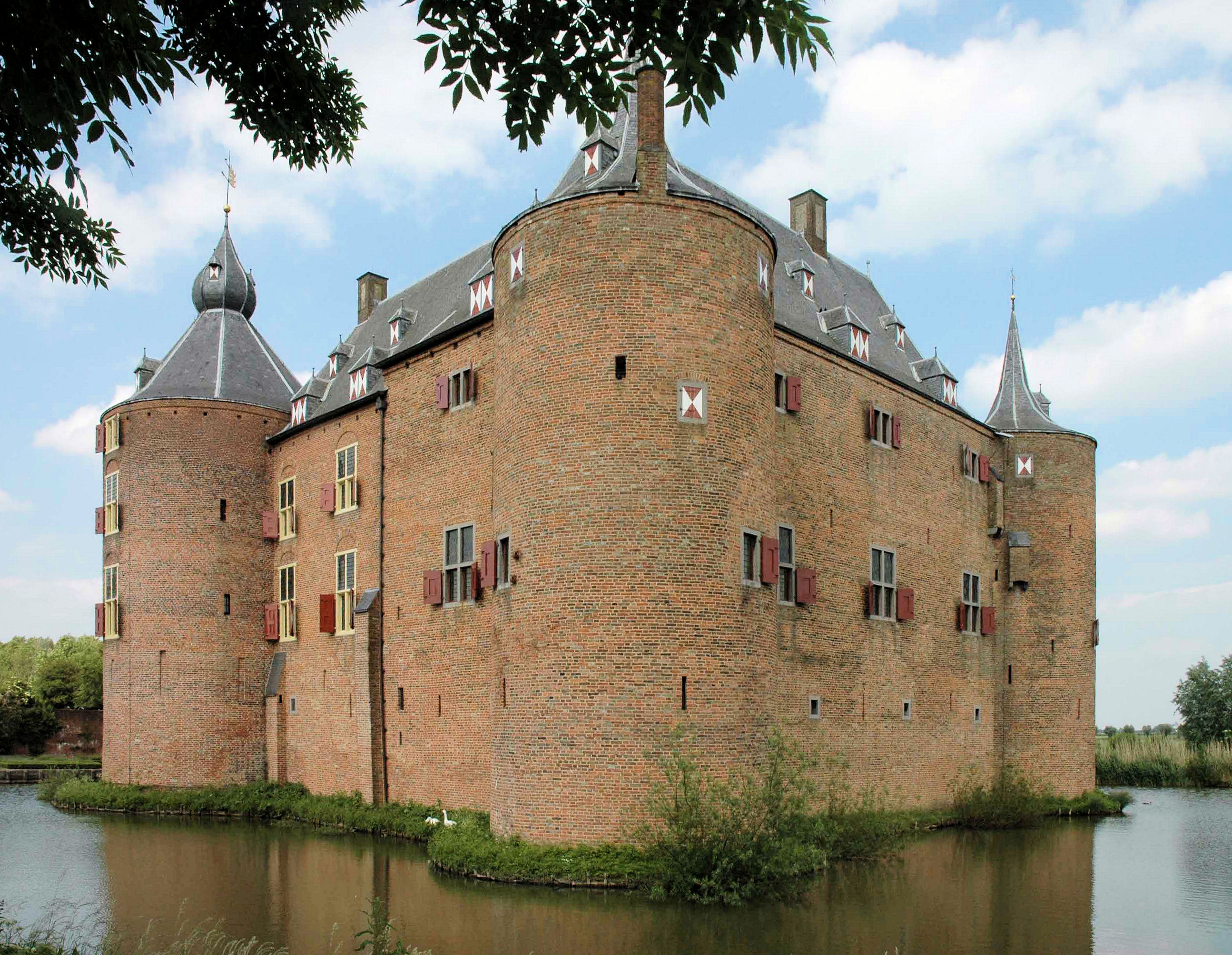
Ammersoyen Castle in Ammerzoden

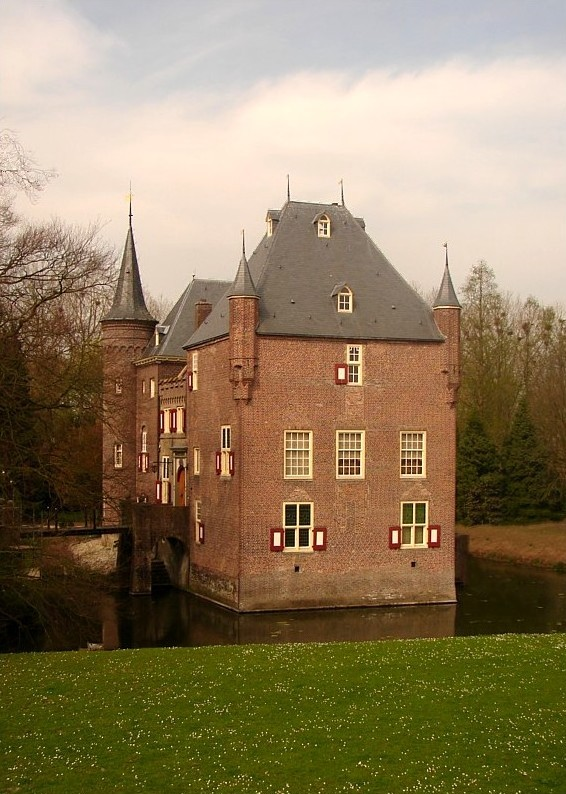
The castle of Well

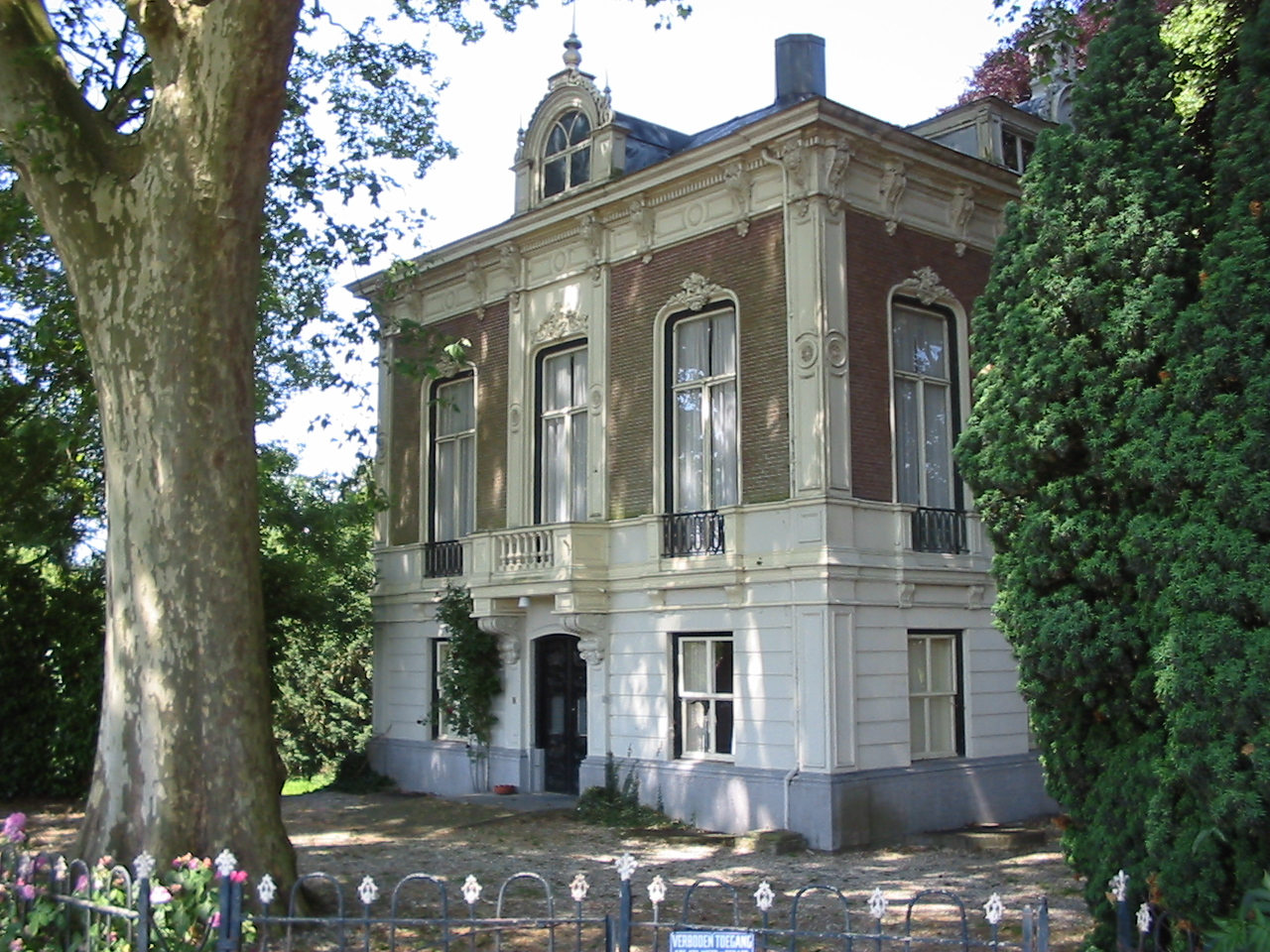
Villa Ouderzorg in Hurwenen

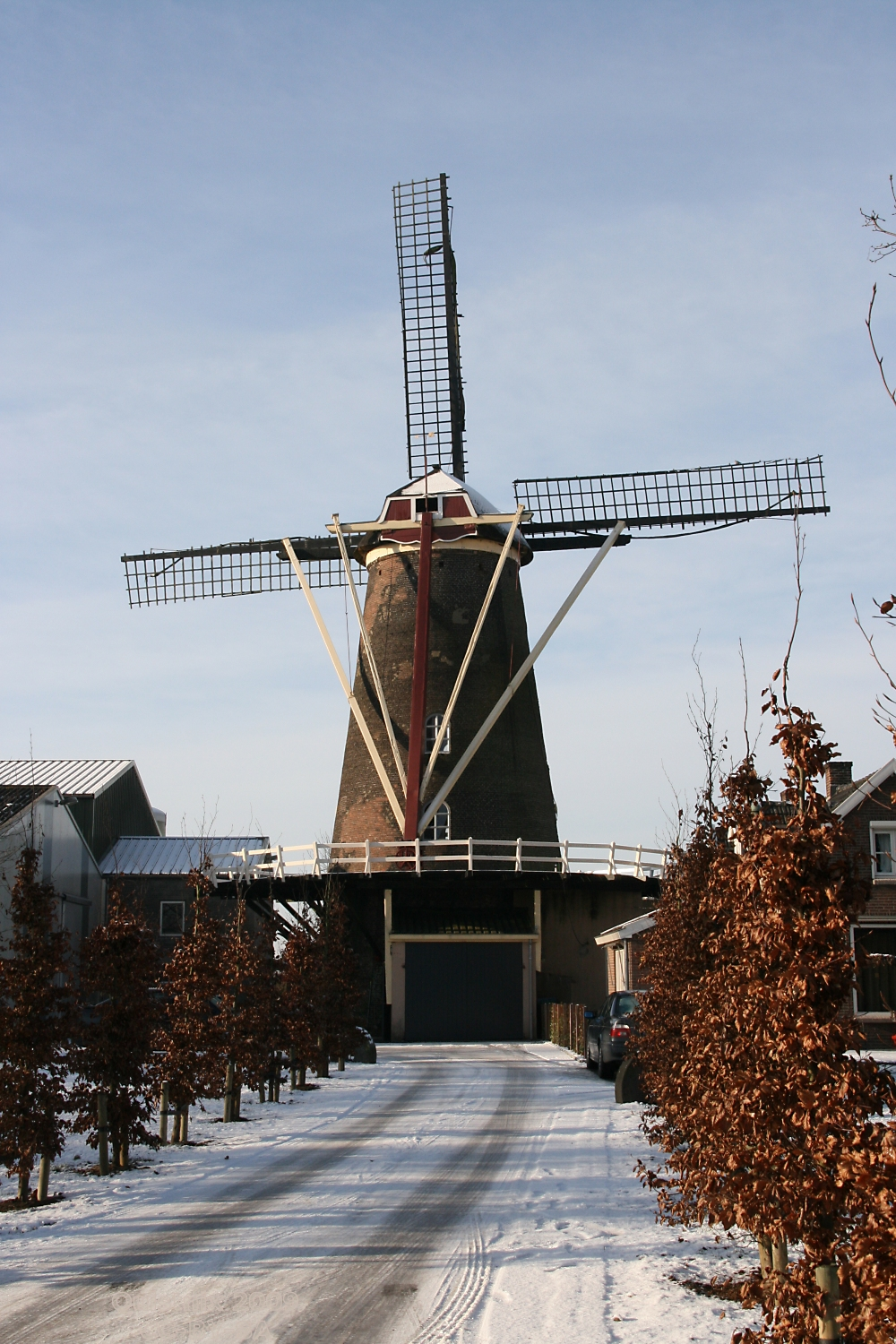
The windmill Sarah Catharina in Kerkdriel

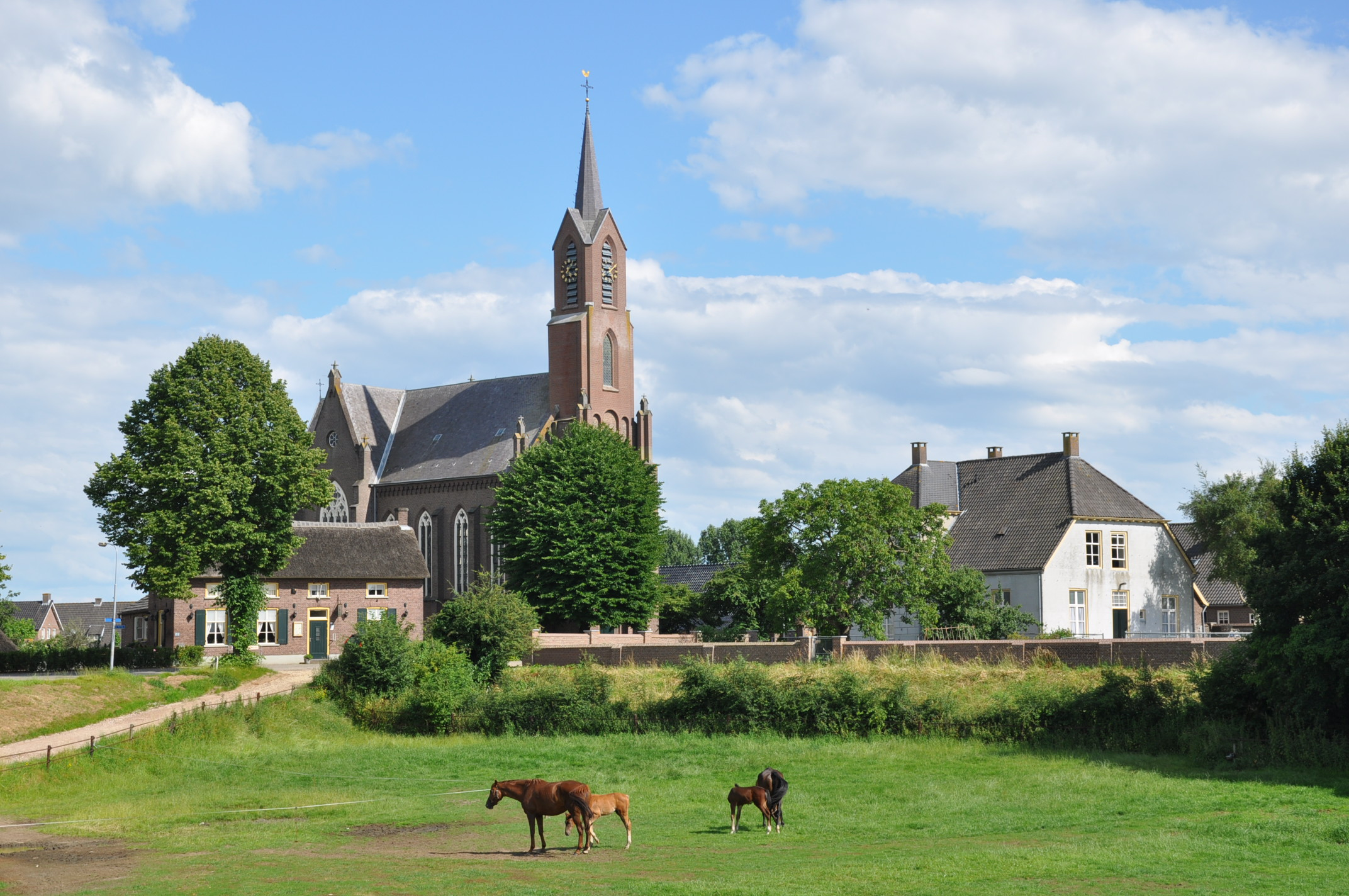
Hubertus-church in Alem

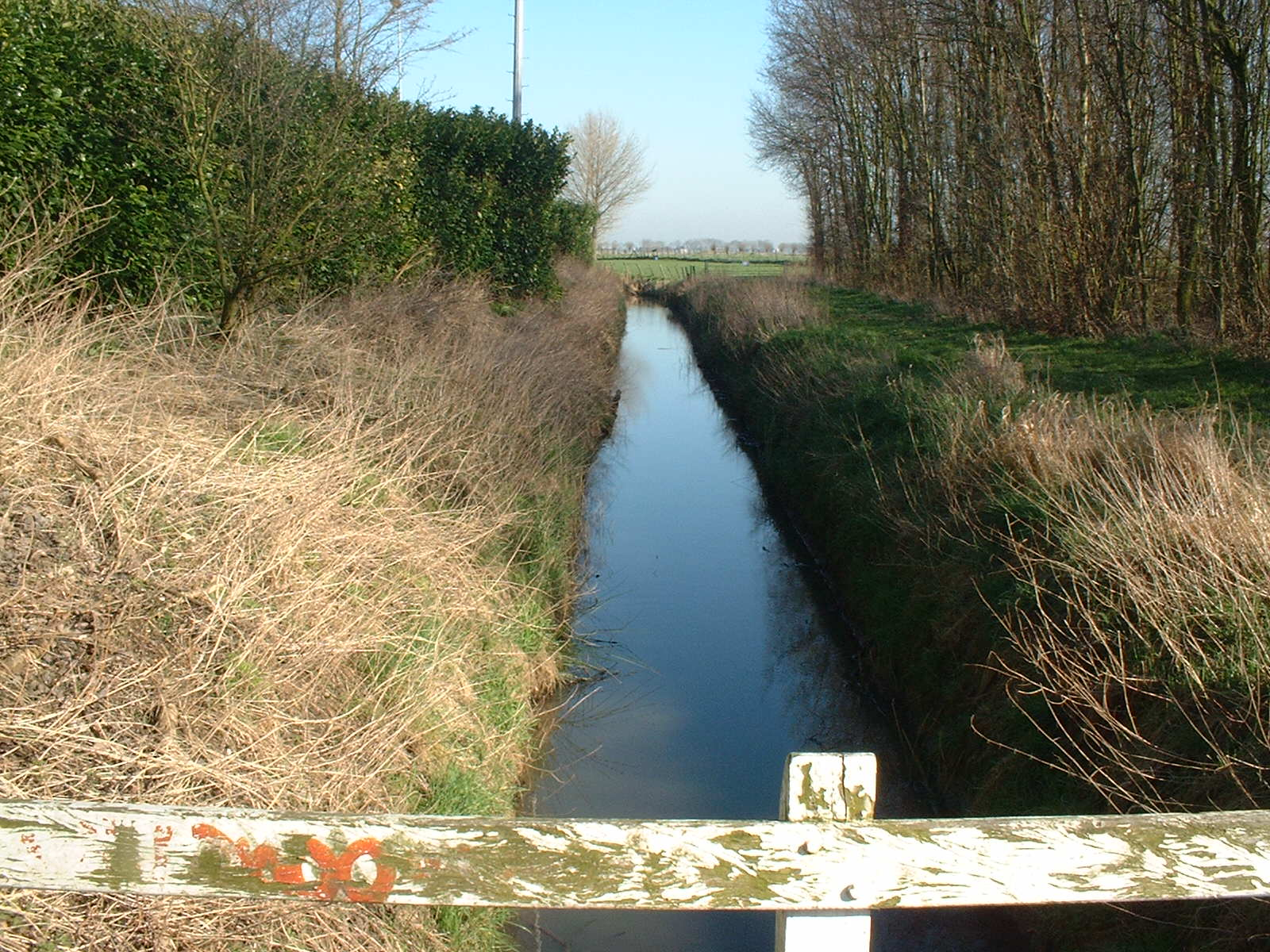
Meersloot in Ammerzoden
