= Kerkdriel =

- Town
- Flag Coat of arms

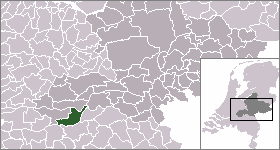

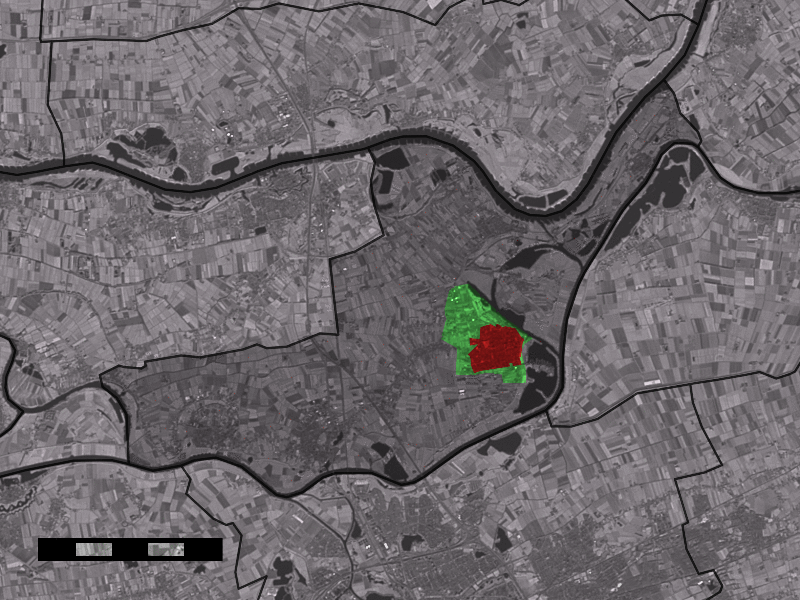
- The town centre (red) and the statistical district (light green) of Kerkdriel in the municipality of Maasdriel.
- Coordinates: 51°46′N 5°20′E
- Country: Netherlands
- Province: Gelderland (north of the 'maas')
- Municipality: Maasdriel

Population (1 January 2019)
  - Total: 6,765
- Time zone: UTC+1 (CET)
  - Summer (DST): UTC+2 (CEST)
- Postal code: 5331
- Dialing code: 0418

Kerkdriel is a town in the Dutch province of Gelderland. It is a part of the municipality of Maasdriel, and lies about 8 km north of 's-Hertogenbosch.

The town of Kerkdriel had 6,765 inhabitants, on 1 January 2019. The approximate built-up area of the town is 1.5 km^{2}, and contains 2,835 residences. The statistical area "Kerkdriel", which includes peripheral parts of the village, as well as the surrounding countryside, has a population of around 10,210.

Due to its positioning between two rivers (Meuse and Waal), a strong local linguistic accent developed during the post second-world-war period. Those who speak the "Driels" accent may be identified via the test phrase "Kees de Beer" (proper: Keas d'n Bear).
