= Ammerzoden =

- Village
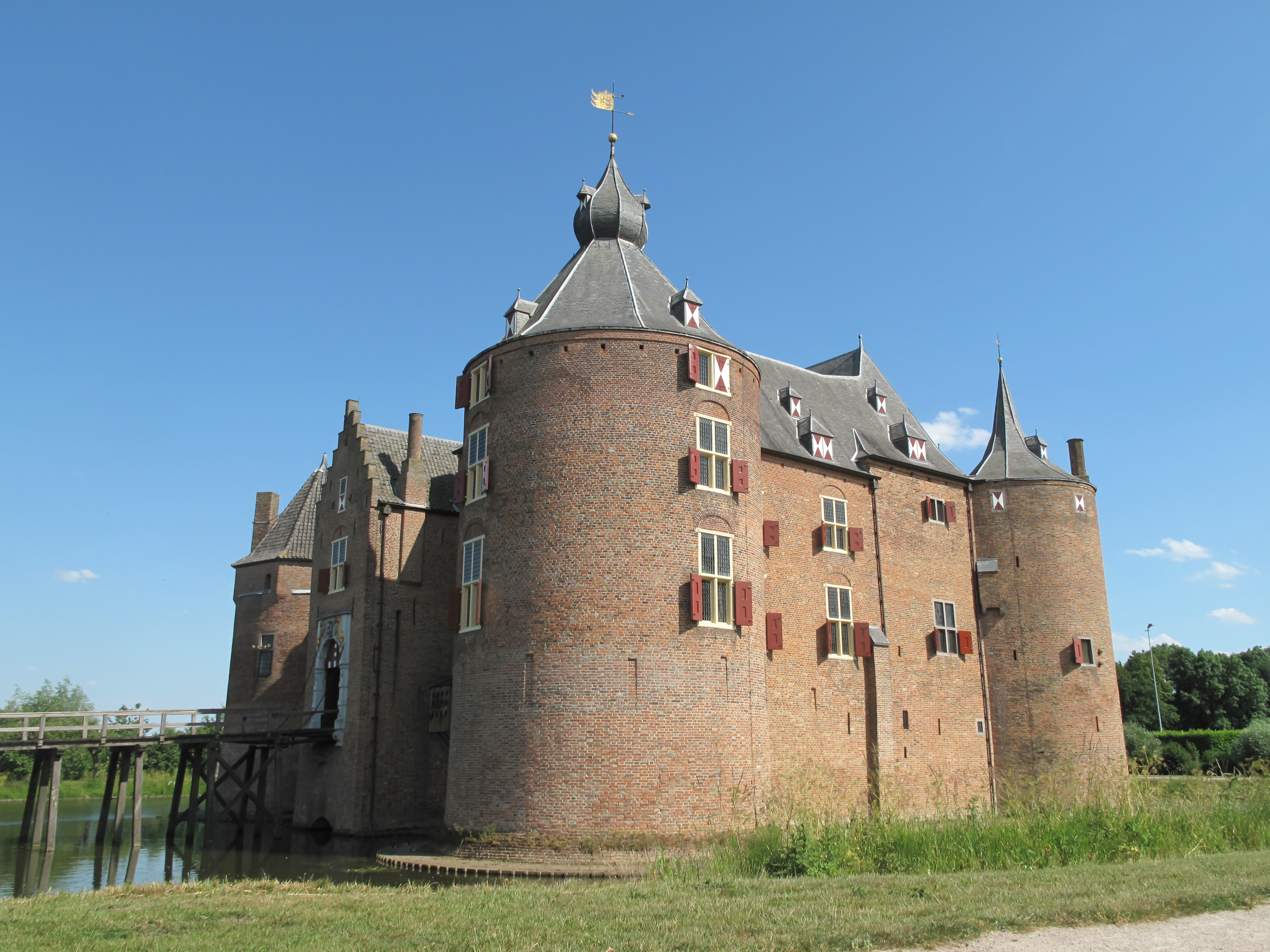

- Flag Coat of arms

- Location in the Netherlands Ammerzoden (Netherlands)
- Coordinates: 51°45′N 5°13′E
- Country: Netherlands
- Province: Gelderland
- Municipality: Maasdriel

Population (1 January 2010)
  - Total: 3,548
- Time zone: UTC+1 (CET)
  - Summer (DST): UTC+2 (CEST)
- Postal code: 5324
- Dialing code: 073

Ammerzoden is a village on the northern bank of the Maas river in western Gelderland, a Dutch province. The people of the village have strong connections with the people in the province of North Brabant, especially the nearby city of 's-Hertogenbosch. Since 1 January 1999, Ammerzoden has been part of the municipality of Maasdriel.

Ammerzoden has a famous castle, 'Kasteel Ammersoyen', built around 1300. It was heavily damaged by fire in 1590, and sustained damage during World War II. The castle was reopened in 1975.

Ammerzoden has two churches. The Protestant church, built between 1500 and 1547 as a Catholic church, was partly destroyed by the French in 1672. Some years before, the church became the property of the Protestants. Even today, most of the building is a ruin. Some parts are restored and in use.

In the nineteenth century, the Catholic people built a new church for themselves, named after St. Willibrord. This building was destroyed by the Germans in World War II. A new church with the same name has existed since 1953.

Until 1999, Ammerzoden was a separate municipality

== Statistics ==
In 2001, the town of Ammerzoden had 2849 inhabitants. The built-up area of the town was 0.69 km^{2}, and contained 1034 residences. The statistical area "Ammerzoden", which also can include the peripheral parts of the village, as well as the surrounding countryside, has a population of around 3180.

== Gallery ==
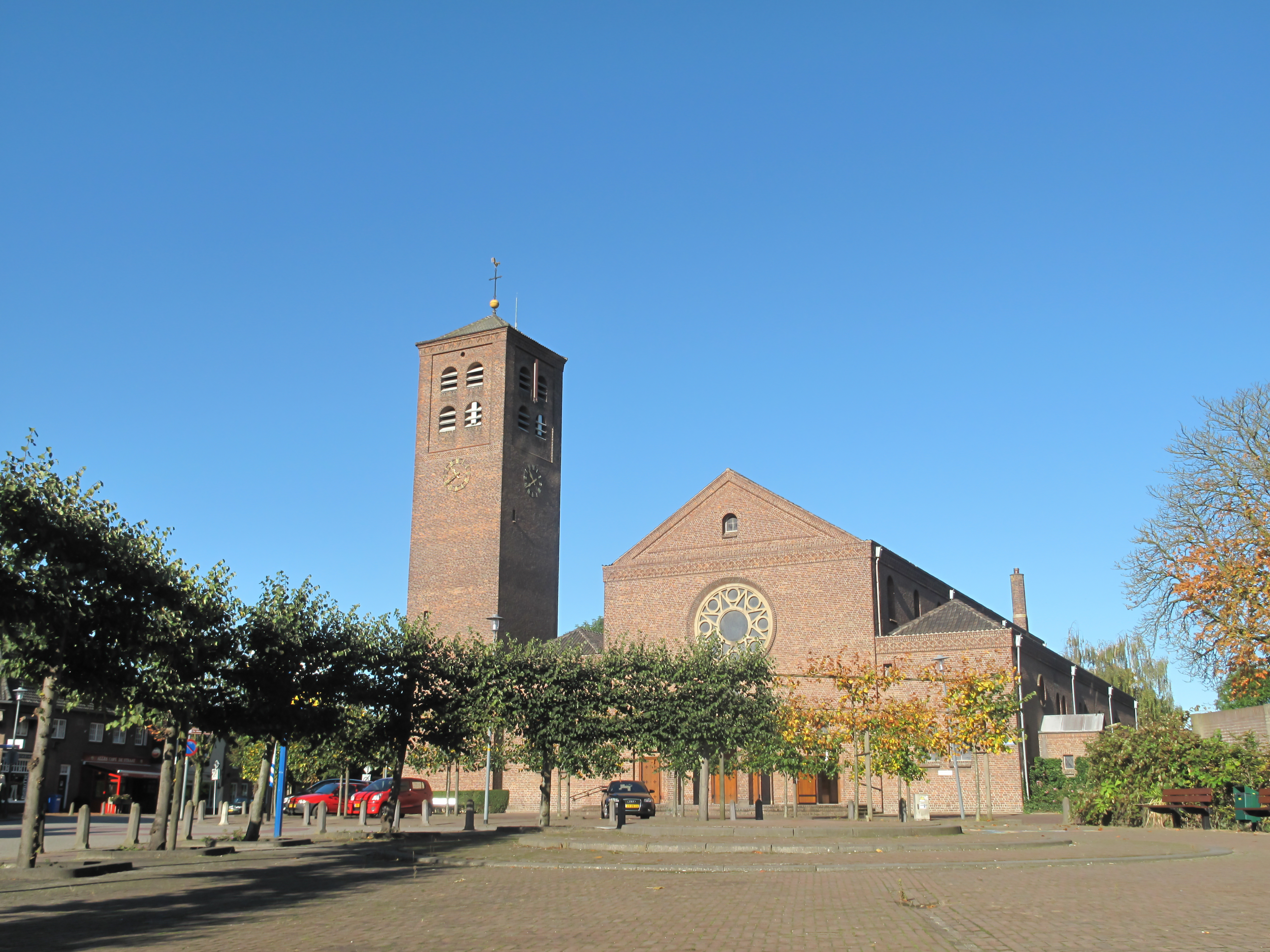
Ammerzoden, church: de Heilige Willibrorduskerk

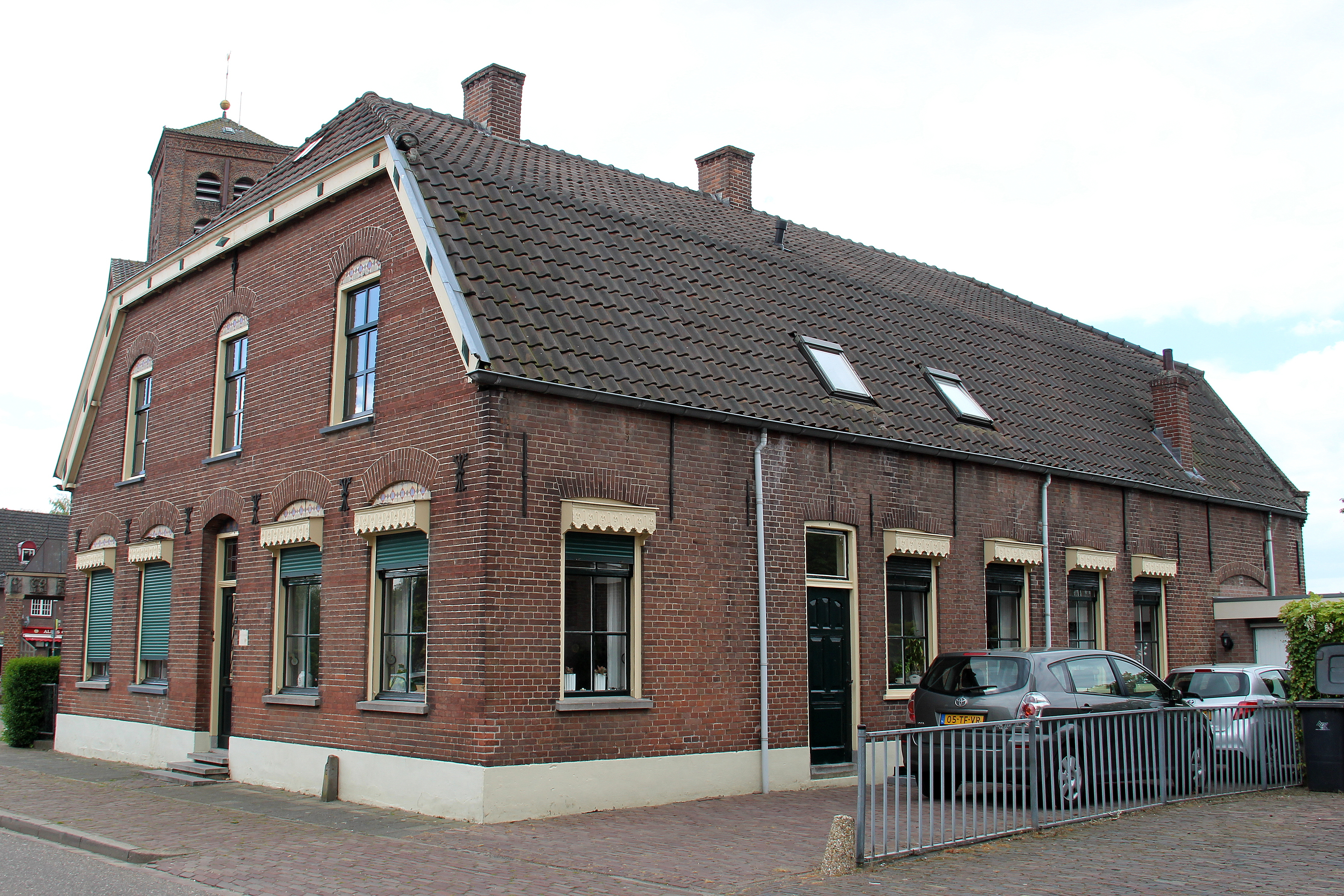
Huis in Ammerzoden
