= Engelen Lock =

Lock with vertical-lift bridge in the Dieze Canal in the Netherlands

- Sluis Engelen
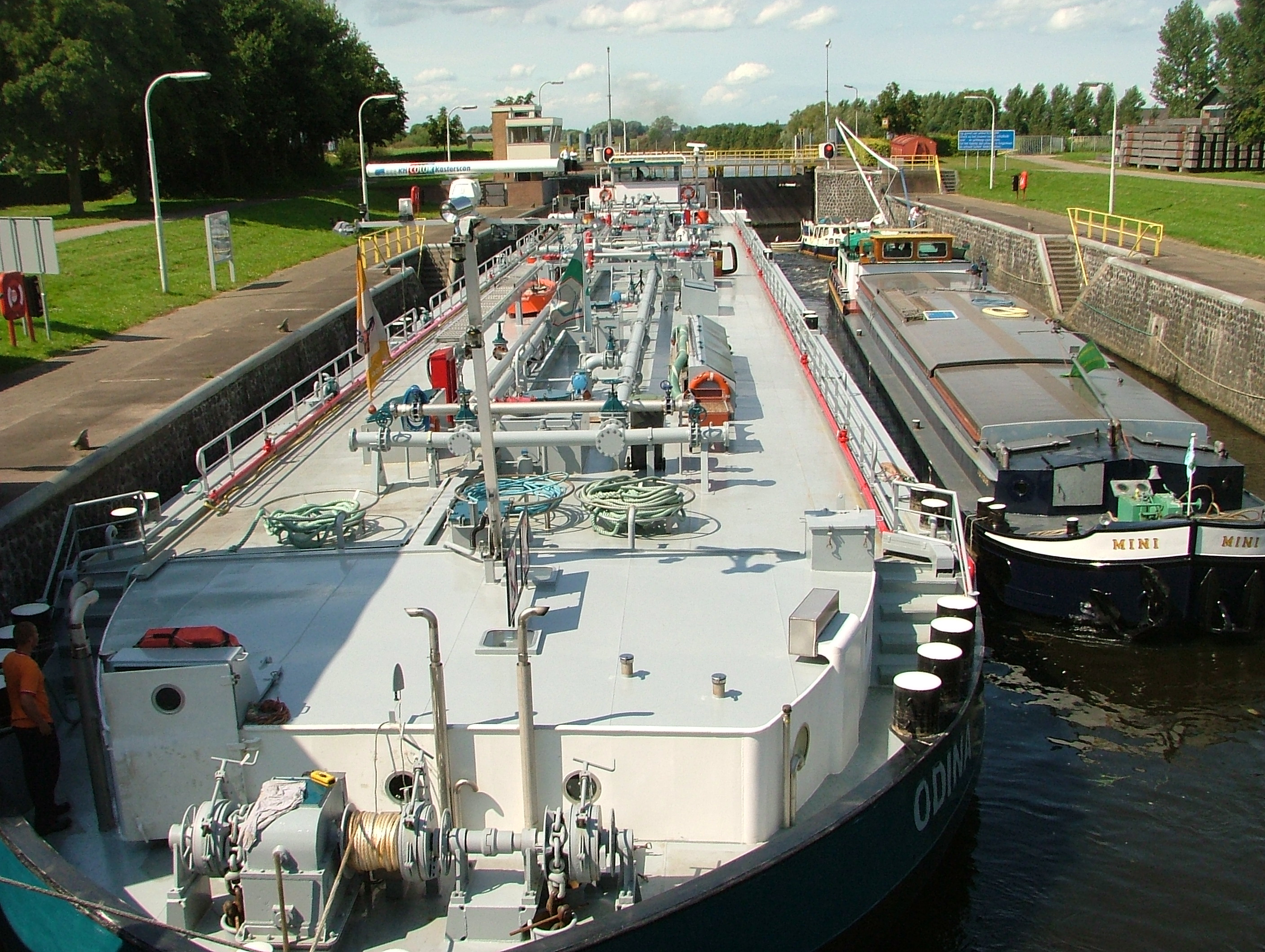
- A tanker and freighter waiting for the vertical-lift bridge to open
- Interactive map of Engelen Lock
- 51.729756°N 5.258940°E
- Waterway: Dieze Canal
- Country: Netherlands
- County: North Brabant
- Maintained by: Municipality of 's-Hertogenbosch
- First built: 1 July 1902
- Length: 90 m
- Width: 13 m (gates); 20 m (center lock chamber)

Engelen Lock is a lock with vertical-lift bridge in the Dieze Canal near Engelen, North Brabant, just before the canal exits into the Meuse.

== Location ==
The Dieze is a short river in North Brabant, the Netherlands, tributary of the Meuse. It is formed by the confluence of the rivers Dommel and Aa in 's-Hertogenbosch. The Dieze Canal is a c. 2 km long shortcut from the Dieze to the Meuse and was opened in 1890. Engelen Lock is an intrinsic part of the Dieze Canal. This canal is classified as CEMT-class IV.

== Characteristics ==
The lock chamber of Engelen Lock is 90.00 m long. The lock chamber is not square. It is 20.00 m wide in the center, and 18 m wide at 40 m from the center. The opening between the gates is 13.00 m wide. The sides of the lock chamber have an angle of 5 degrees, making the lock chamber smaller at the bottom. Each lock head (side) has a double set of wooden lock gates, making that the lock can be used when the Dieze side is highest, but also when the Meuse side is highest.

The mitre sill of the gates on the Meuse side is 2.70 m below Amsterdam Ordnance Datum (AOD). The mitre sill on the Dieze side is 0.93 m below AOD. This part of the design took a possible lowering of the Dieze level with 0.50 m into account. On the Meuse side the dike is 6.80 m abover AOD. The top of the lock heads and the terrain of the locks is at 6.40 m above AOD. The walls of the lock chamber get to 5.00 m above AOD. If the water gets higher, the dikes around the lock chamber, connected to the lock head, have to stop the water. This construction allows lower lock chamber walls, which can therefore be lighter and cheaper, and are also more convenient for ships.

Engelen Lock is also part of the Meuse dikes and water management system. Each lock head has three rabbets which allow the insertion of beams which can safely withstand the pressure of very high water levels. The lock will then be out of order for shipping.

At each side of the lock chamber there is a 2 by 1.73 m sewer connecting to the Dieze canal on both outer sides of the lock. Each sewer is connected to the lock chamber by six side sewers. On their extremities, each of the sewers is closed by a cylinder closure of the Caligny system. This system is named for Anatole de Caligny (1811–1892) and allows for rapid opening and closing. The sewer system makes that water filling or leaving the lock, comes from the bottom of the lock chamber, it does not hinder the ships inside. At the time of commissioning, the sewer and caligny closures allowed for a very quick operation, even though the lock was very large. Like the lock itself, the sewers can also be closed by beams. The Caligny closures are rare in the Netherlands.

The lock is supported on 9.5 m long bearing piles. The lock heads are of (watertight) masonry with trass mortar. On the surface are the hardest bricks klinkers, the bricks on the inside are only a bit softer hardgrauw. The walls of the lock chamber are faced with columnar Basalt. The sills, and many of the most exposed elements are made of granite. Part of the granite slabs has later been replaced by concrete. In the lock chamber and on the sides of the lock heads are beds storted on the bottom to prevent the current from eroding the canal floor. That on the bottom of the lock chamber is at 3.10 m below AOD.

On the Dieze side is a vertical-lift bridge over the lock. In its up position it is at 8.40 m above the standard Dieze level. When closed, this is 4.30 m. On each side of the lock there are breaking and waiting facilities of interconnected dolphins with a walkway.

== History ==
=== Context ===
The Dieze is a relatively wide waterway from 's-Hertogenbosch to the Meuse. In 1826 the Zuid-Willemsvaart was opened, making the city an important hub in water transport from the sea to Liège and further up the Meuse. The use of steam (paddle) ships further increased traffic to the city. It therefore began to press for improvements to the Dieze. One of these was the 1861 opening of a big twin lock at Fort Crèvecoeur, where the Dieze exits into the Meuse. In 1866 Crèvecoeur Lock let through about 13,000 vessels. In volume these totaled about twice the size of the 8,500 vessels which sailed up the Zuid-Willemsvaart by passing Sluis 0 in 's-Hertogenbosch.

In 1870 the Utrecht–Boxtel railway was completed by the opening of the section from 's-Hertogenbosch to Hedel. This featured a very narrow bridge. In 1894 a new railroad bridge was opened. This swing bridge got an opening of 14 m wide. The minister declared that this was 1.5 m more than at Crèvecoeur Lock, and that this was more than enough, considering that the biggest ship that steamed between 's-Hertogenbosch and Rotterdam was Stad Rotterdam, a paddle steamer with a 12 m beam. The contrast with Sluis 0, which is still only 6.8 m wide, emphasizes the difference in traffic upstream and downstream of 's-Hertogenbosch.

=== Construction ===
Dieze Lock would be constructed as a consequence of the construction of the Bergse Maas, which would be completed in 1904. The Bergsche Maas was expected to lower the level of the Meuse. In summer, this would not leave enough water on the Meuse sill of Crèvecoeur Lock, which was at 0.75 m below AOD. Therefore, a plan was made to construct a new lock in the Henriëttewaard. This would become Engelen Lock, and the Dieze Canal was built to connect it to the Meuse and the Dieze at Engelen.

The first design already had the final dimensions of 90 by 13 m, with a lock chamber that narrowed towards the bottom. This would allow the biggest Rhine ships to reach 's-Hertogenbosch. The society for the promotion of steam propulsion was very pleased with the big lock chamber, but noted that it was not ideal for commerce. It was suitable for bulk carriers which had a lower cost level, because they could be larger. It was less suitable for the many freighters which carried higher value breakbulk cargo, and would lose money because larger locks were slower. Another problem which the society feared was the water loss that operating such a big lock chamber would cause. It noted that in the summer of 1894, Crèvecoeur Lock had been closed down, because otherwise the water level would have made navigation impossible upstream. For these reasons, the society advocated a double lock with chambers of 90 and 50 m, or to add a third pair of gates to split the lock into two chambers.

On 2 December 1896 construction of the Dieze Lock, canal dikes and some connected works, estimated at 825,000 were tendered. The lowest offer was by A. van der Meijden Az. and J. van der Plas from Hardinxveld for 825,000 guilders. The next offer was only 100 guilders higher. The highest of 11 other offers was 939,600 guilders. On 1 July 1902 Engelen Lock and the Dieze Canal were opened for shipping. The dimensions of ships allowed in the lock were 90 m by 12.30 m by 2.10 m.

=== Renovation ===
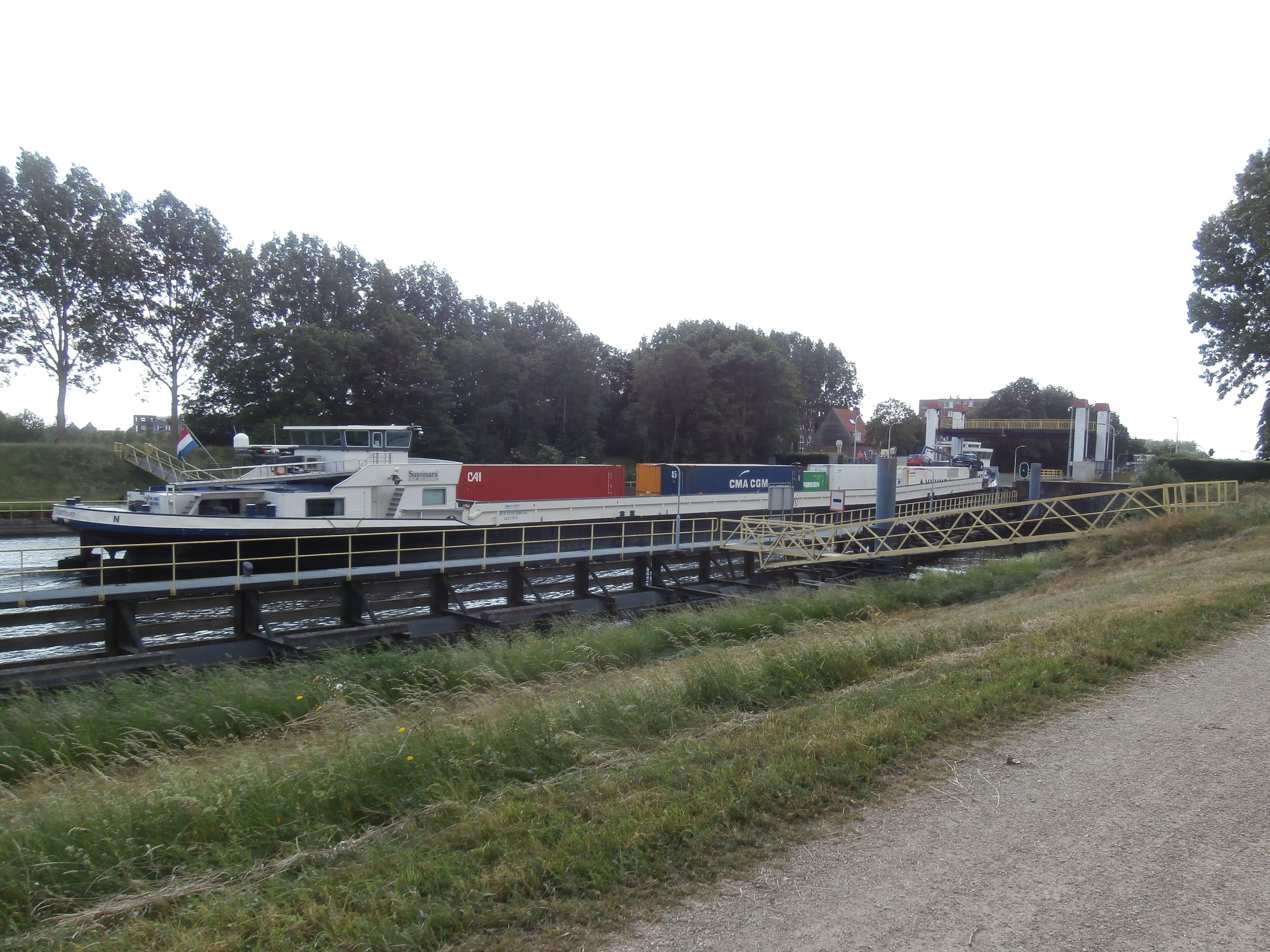
Containers pass Engelen Lock

In 1975 the lock was renovated. This is when the cable ferry was replaced by the vertical-lift bridge In 1993 zijn de remmingswerken in de voorhaven aan de Maaszijde van de sluis vervangen door wachtplaatsen met loopbruggen naar de wal.

=== After 2014 ===
In 2014 the big Máxima Canal was opened east of 's-Hertogenbosch. It made the whole of the Zuid-Willemsvaart CEMT class IV, but led to the closure to commercial shipping of the Zuid-Willemsvaart in 's-Hertogenbosch. Engelen Lock was transferred to the municipality of 's-Hertogenbosch, because the Dieze was no longer part of the system of national waterways. Meanwhile, the harbor of 's-Hertogenbosch was revitalized by the establishment of a container terminal, and the continued presence of Heineken.

=== The 2021 floods ===
The 2021 European floods would again show that Engelen Lock is part of the Meuse dikes. During the floods the Meuse water was much higher than that of the Dieze / Dommel. For some days, this would lead to a very high water level on the Meuse side of the lock. Therefore, the beams were placed in the rabbets of the Meuse lock head on Sunday 18 July 2021, which was also done on many other locations. This was to prevent the Meuse water from entering the Dieze. On 23 July the Dieze was reopened for shipping. The delay caused significant damage for companies depending on the canal.
