= Dieze (disambiguation) =

Dieze may refer to

- Dieze, a river in the Netherlands
- Fort Dieze, a former fortress near ’s-Hertogenbosch
- Johann Andreas Dieze (1729–1785), a German Hispanist and librarian
