= Sluis 0 =

Lock in the Zuid-Willemsvaart, 's-Hertogenbosch, Netherlands

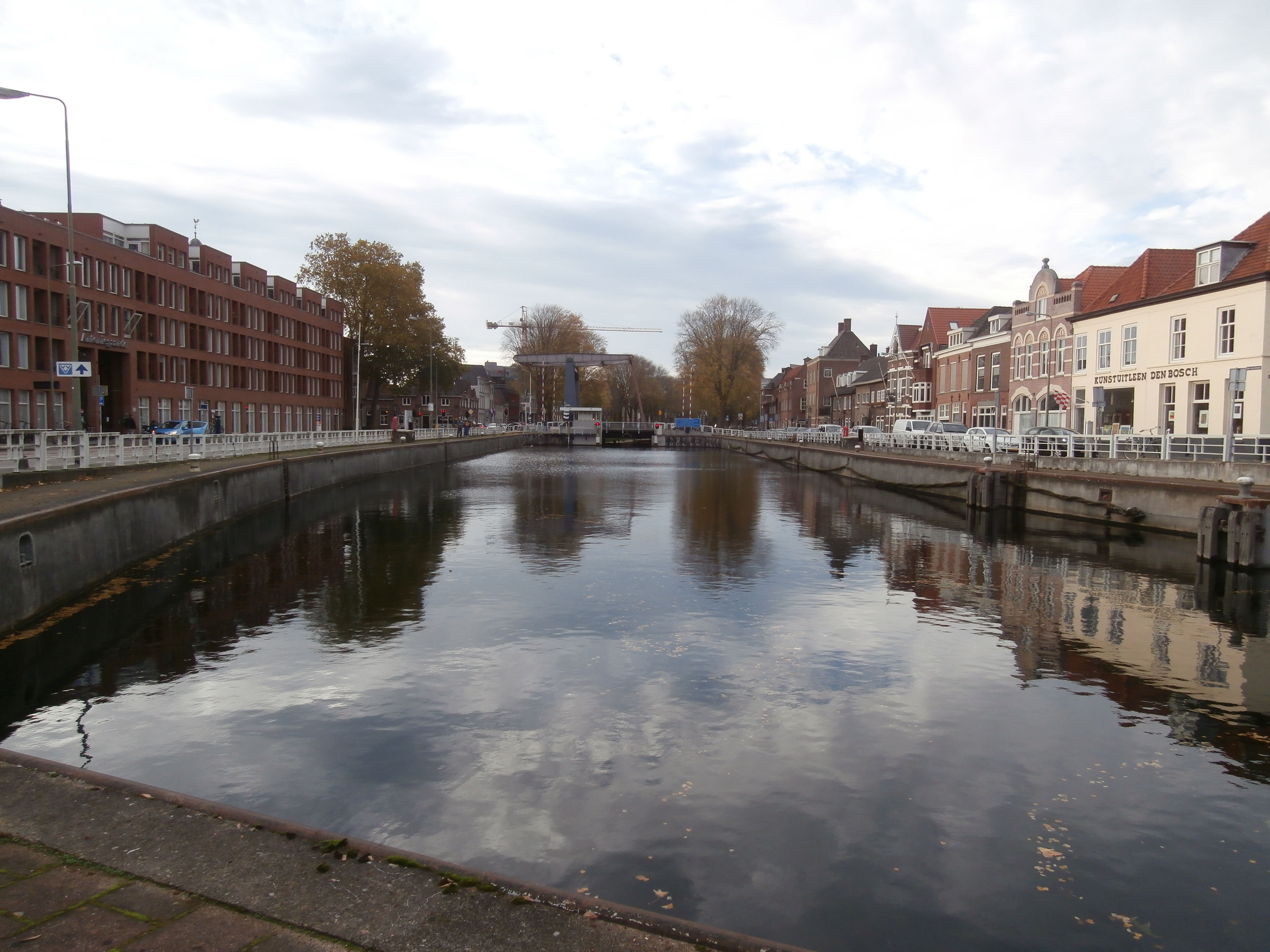
- Lock chamber of Sluis 0 in 's-Hertogenbosch
- 51.688488°N 5.315841°E
- Waterway: Zuid-Willemsvaart
- Country: Netherlands
- County: North Brabant
- First built: 1826
- Latest built: 2021 (planned)
- Length: 124.2 m

Sluis 0 is a lock in the Zuid-Willemsvaart, in 's-Hertogenbosch, Netherlands. It is a large lock that will be made much smaller in the 2020s.

== History ==
=== Name ===
The name Sluis 0, or 'Lock Zero', has given rise to many misunderstandings. When construction of the Zuid-Willemsvaart started in 1822, it was to have 19 locks. In 's-Hertogenbosch there was to be a keersluis, or flood lock, where the canal crossed the eastern walls of the fortifications. This flood lock consisted of two flood gates, one in the city walls, and one over a hundred meters backwards at Hinthamer Bridge. Their purpose was to guarantee the inundations around the city in times of emergency, and therefore they were normally open. Because of this different purpose, Sluis 0 was not numbered as one of the locks of the Zuid-Willemsvaart.

=== Becomes a lock ===
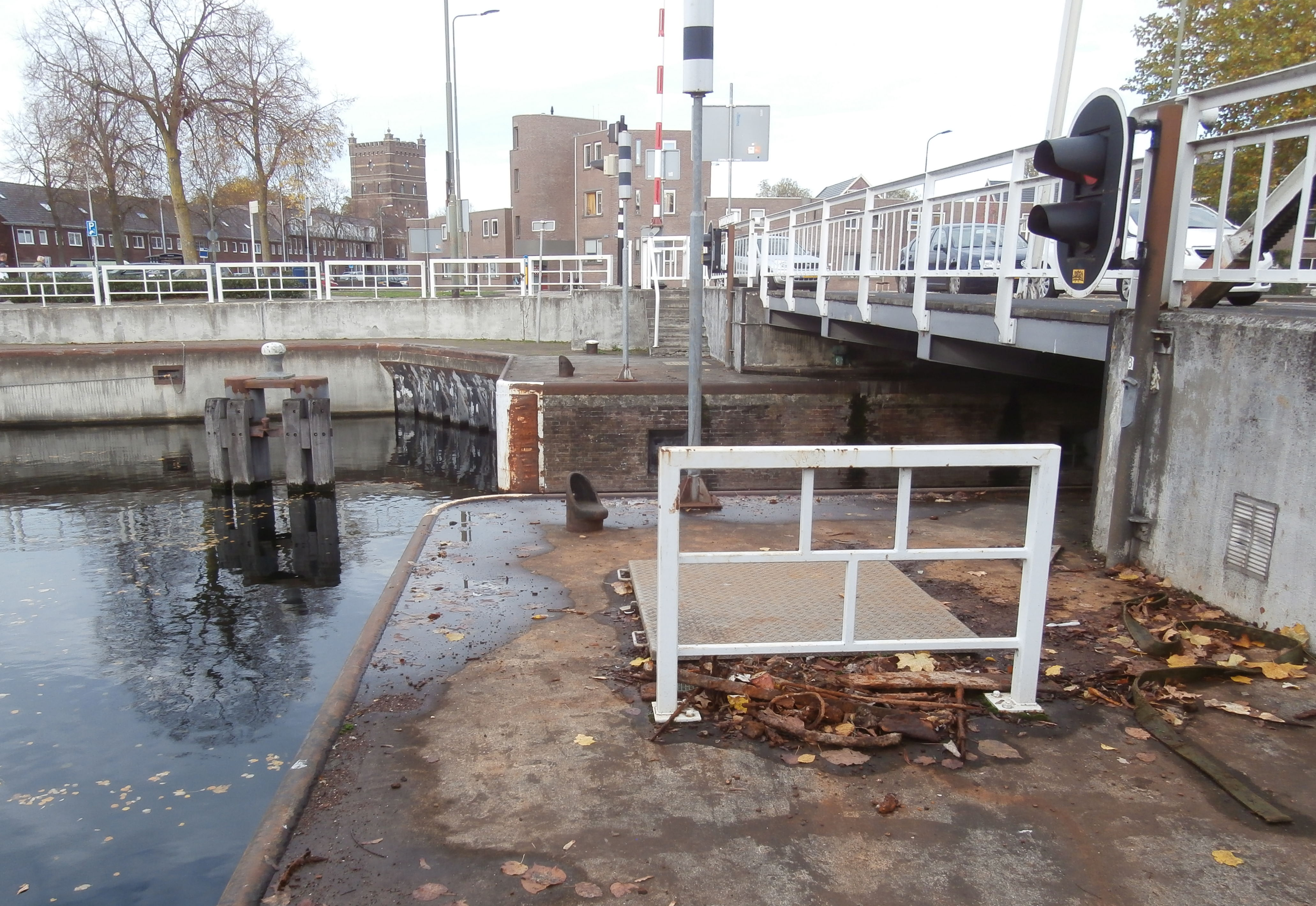
Sluis 0, the narrow passage in 2020

It was possible for Sluis 0 to lift ships, even though its length of 124 m made this more tedious. As intended, Sluis 0 operated as a lock when the water outside the city was high. It also operated when the Dieze was low. That skippers started to use the lock as a place for loading and unloading had probably not been expected.

When the Dieze got a lock at Fort Crèvecoeur in 1859, it became necessary to use Sluis 0 as a lock, and at about that time it got its name 'Sluis 0'. The difference in water level between Lock 1 and Crèvecoeur, in theory amounted to only 40 cm.

=== Widened in the 1930s ===
In time the small difference in water level between Lock 1 and Crèvecoeur fostered ideas that perhaps one of either Sluis 0 or Lock 1 could be demolished. The choice was made to demolish Lock 1. Sluis 0 had to be renovated to stop a water level that would become 2 meters higher. Sluis 0 was renovated in 1932/33. The walls were made vertical, and the chamber was widened to 26.5 m. During the operation about 35 meters of heavy, and 57 meters of lighter medieval brick walls were found, and removed. Part of this was probably the quay of the River Aa where it entered the city to join the Binnendieze as Doode Stroom.

== Situation 2014-2020 ==
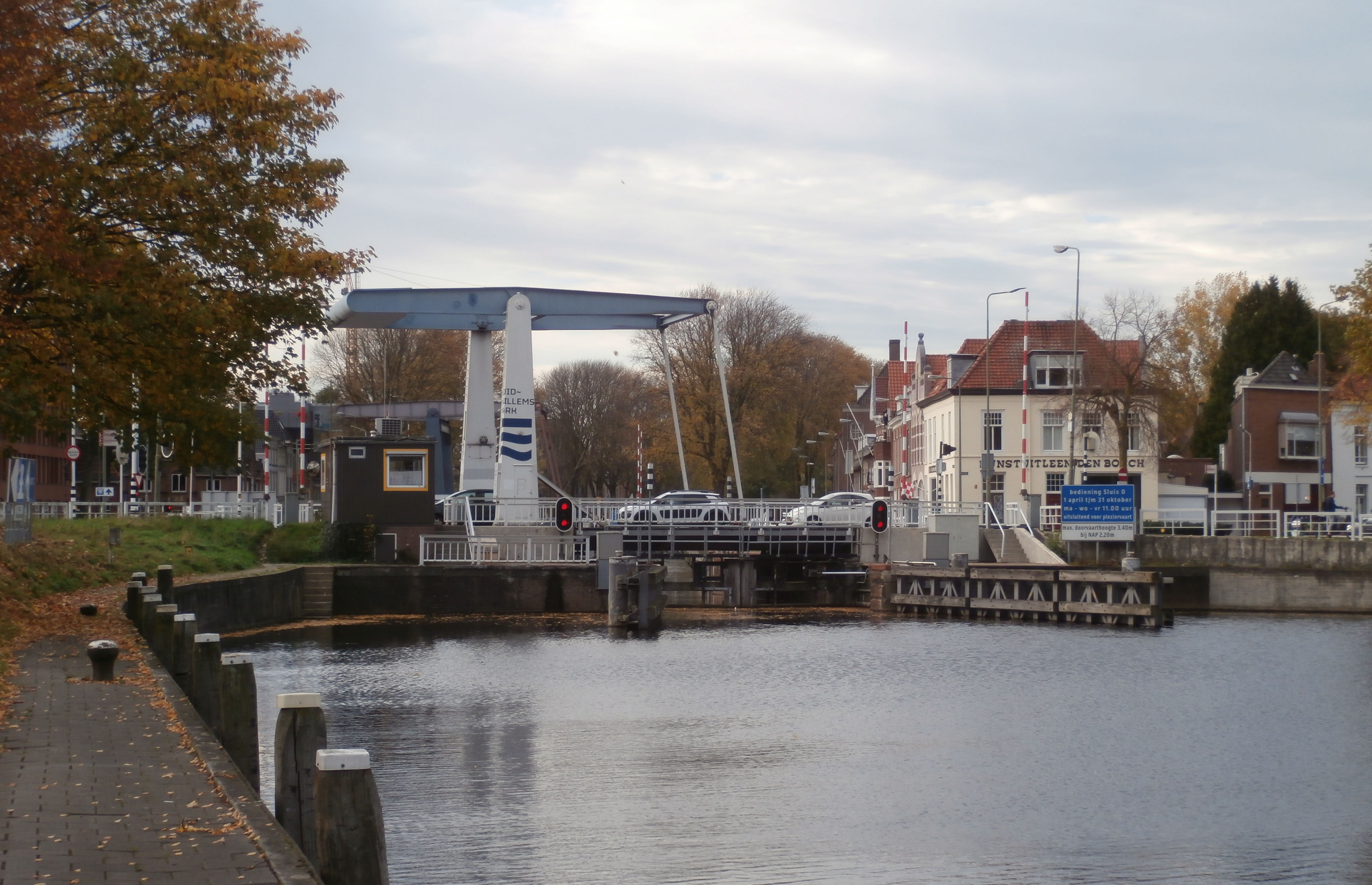
Sluis 0 from the east in 2020

During 2014, the last year of operation for commercial shipping, Sluis 0 was 124,2 m long, had a chamber of 116,5 m long and was 26,4 m wide. The width at the doors was 6,8 m. Maximum size of ships that could use the lock was 90.0 m long, 6.7 m wide, and 2.1 m deep.

The Zuid-Willemsvaart continued to be a significant waterway in the twentieth century. However, as ships became ever larger, the passage through 's-Hertogenbosch became increasingly problematic. The canal had been designed for ships of a maximum draught of somewhat less than 2 m. Over time, it had been upgraded to CEMT-Class II. The Dutch government then wanted to upgrade it further to CEMT-Class IV, but this would have incurred high cost. It would also not address the congestion problems caused by the combination of dramatically increased road traffic and regularly opened bridges in the city center. Therefore, the Máxima Canal was dug just east of Sluis 0. In enabled ships of CEMT-Class IV to reach the Meuse without sailing through the center of 's-Hertogenbosch.

After the opening of the Máxima Canal in December 2014 it became quite on Sluis 0. Commercial navigation was forbidden, and the opening of the bridges and Sluis 0 in 's-Hertogenbosch city was severely limited. Recreational traffic then also fell. It went from 1944 boats in 2014 to about 300 a year thereafter.

== Plans in 2020 ==
By 2020 many plans had been made for Sluis 0. The Waterschappen wanted a higher water drainage capacity at peak times, but lower water use in the dry season. The municipality wanted more recreational craft to sail through 's-Hertogenbosch. Meanwhile, the lock itself was end of life. Therefore, a plan was made for a smaller lock that could be operated faster, allowing higher recreational use. Instead of using 9,000 m^{3} of water, the new tighter and shorter lock chamber would use only 450 m^{3} at each use. On each side of the new lock, very large drainage pipes were planned. When needed these would allow increased drainage through the city center, instead of along the river Aa. On top of the tightened sides of the lock chamber, a park, the Zuid-Willemspark would be realized.
