= Dieze =

River in the Netherlands

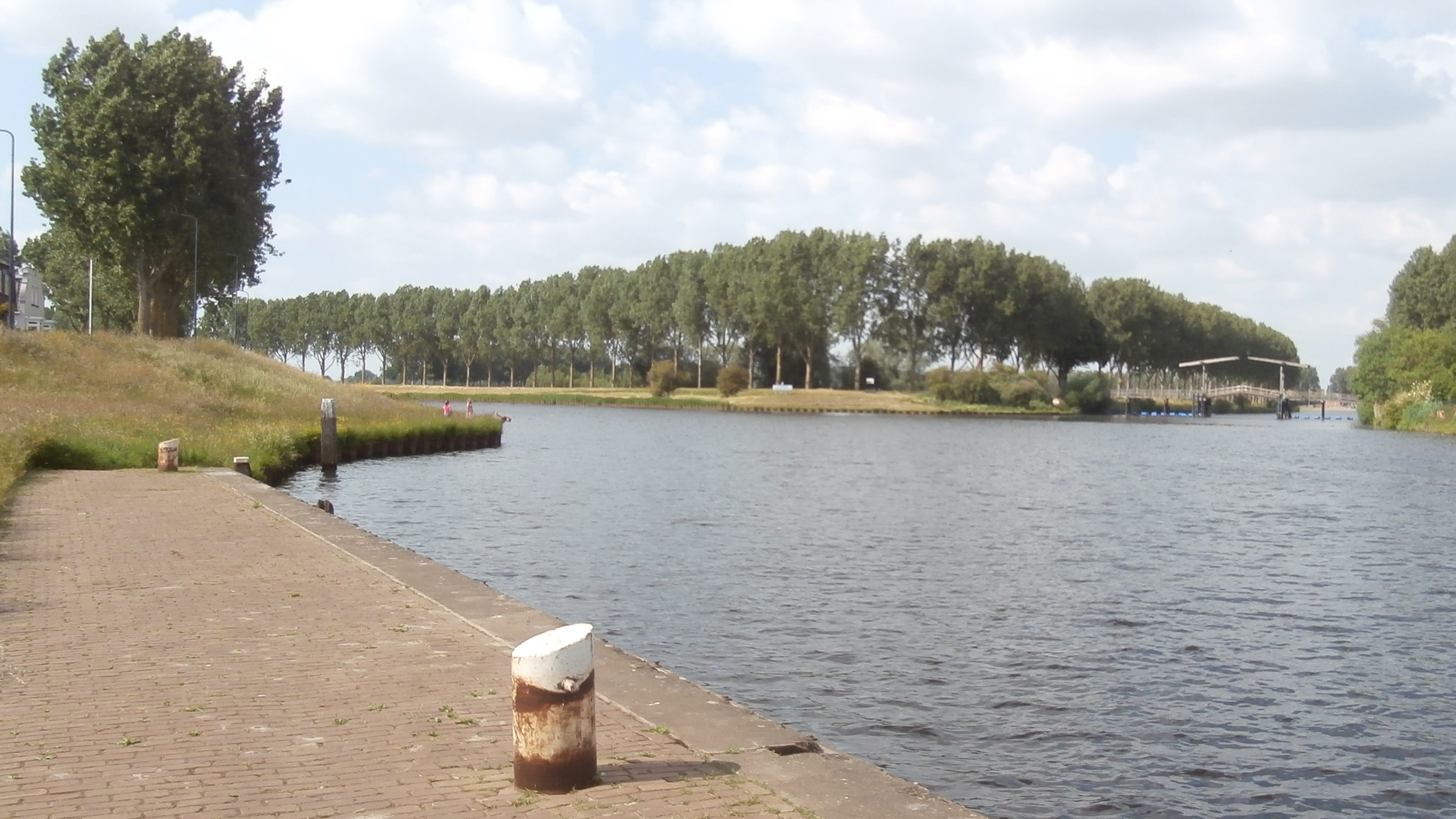
- The Dieze-Dieze Canal split at Engelen

Location
- Country: Netherlands

Physical characteristics
- Source
  - location: Confluence of Dommel and Aa
  - coordinates: 51°41′45″N 5°18′3″E
- Mouth
  - location: Meuse
  - coordinates: 51°44′3″N 5°15′19″E

Basin features
- Progression: Meuse→ North Sea

The Dieze is a short river in North Brabant, the Netherlands, tributary of the Meuse (Maas). It is formed by the confluence of the rivers Aa and Dommel in 's-Hertogenbosch. The part of the Dieze in the centre of 's-Hertogenbosch is called Binnendieze, a partly covered network of canals. The Dieze flows into the Meuse near Hedel.

== Dieze and Dommel ==
Of the two rivers that form the Dieze, the Dommel is the main river, and the Aa is her tributary. It is remarkable that after this confluence, the last 5 km of the 125-km stream bed of the Dommel is named 'Dieze'. This has historic reasons. The name 'Dieze' used to refer to a river running from Oisterwijk to the Meuse. It consisted of the Esschestroom, which now runs for only 7 km from Oisterwijk to Halder; the Dommel from Halder to 's-Hertogenbosch; the Binnendieze and Aa in 's-Hertogenbosch, and the current Dieze. All of this (about 25 km) was known as the Dieze, because the Dommel was considered to be her tributary.

When the Dommel came to be considered the main river, the stretch of the Dieze between Oisterwijk and Halder was renamed Esschestroom, or Run. The stretch between Halder and 's-Hertogenbosch was renamed Dommel. Within the gates of 's-Hertogenbosch however, the Dommel retained the name 'Dieze', later changed to 'Binnendieze'. Still later the main stream bed of the Dommel was rerouted to the west of the city, creating a new confluence of the Dommel with a diversion of the Aa. From a local perspective, however, these artificial diversions joined the Dieze. which flowed from the city harbor of 's-Hertogenbosch to the Meuse.

== History ==
The river Dieze flows for 5 km from the city harbor of 's-Hertogenbosch to the Meuse. The Dieze and her predecessors have always been the route for commercial shipping of the city. In medieval times it probably gave direct access to the sea, because ships were very small. In 1587 the Dutch Republic built Fort Crèvecoeur to protect their shipping and to control shipping to 's-Hertogenbosch. By then shipping to and from 's-Hertogenbosch was local. In the seventeenth and eighteenth centuries, there were regular connections from 's-Hertogenbosch to cities in Holland and Zeeland.

In 1823-1826 the Zuid-Willemsvaart was dug between 's-Hertogenbosch and Maastricht. It started a new chapter for the Dieze, which now gave access to an inland waterway stretching to Maastricht and Liège. In the nineteenth century regular service by steam (paddle) ships was set up between 's-Hertogenbosch and Rotterdam. These steamships required more space on the water surface. The city, therefore, began to press for improvements to the Dieze. From 1897 to 1902 the Dieze Canal was dug.

In the twentieth century, the Dieze was changed to keep up with the ever-increasing size of ships. However, the passage of the Zuid-Willemsvaart through the city center of 's-Hertogenbosch became ever more troublesome, and could not be widened to serve the bigger ships. Therefore, the Máxima Canal was dug east of 's-Hertogenbosch, creating a new connection between the Zuid-Willemsvaart and the Meuse. After the opening of the Maximakanaal in December 2014, the passage of the Zuid-Willemsvaart through the city was closed to commercial shipping. It could have spelled the end of the 's-Hertogenbosch harbor, but a new future was created by focusing on container transport.

== The Dieze as a commercial waterway ==
The Dieze now consists of the river Dieze and the Dieze Canal. Ships use the river Dieze from the commercial harbor of 's-Hertogenbosch till Engelen. From Engelen to the Meuse, ships use the Engelen Canal. The whole is now a CEMT class IV waterway. Maximum draft for ships on the canal is 2.7 m (8 ft 10 in).

== Sections of the Dieze ==
=== Commercial Harbor of 's-Hertogenbosch ===
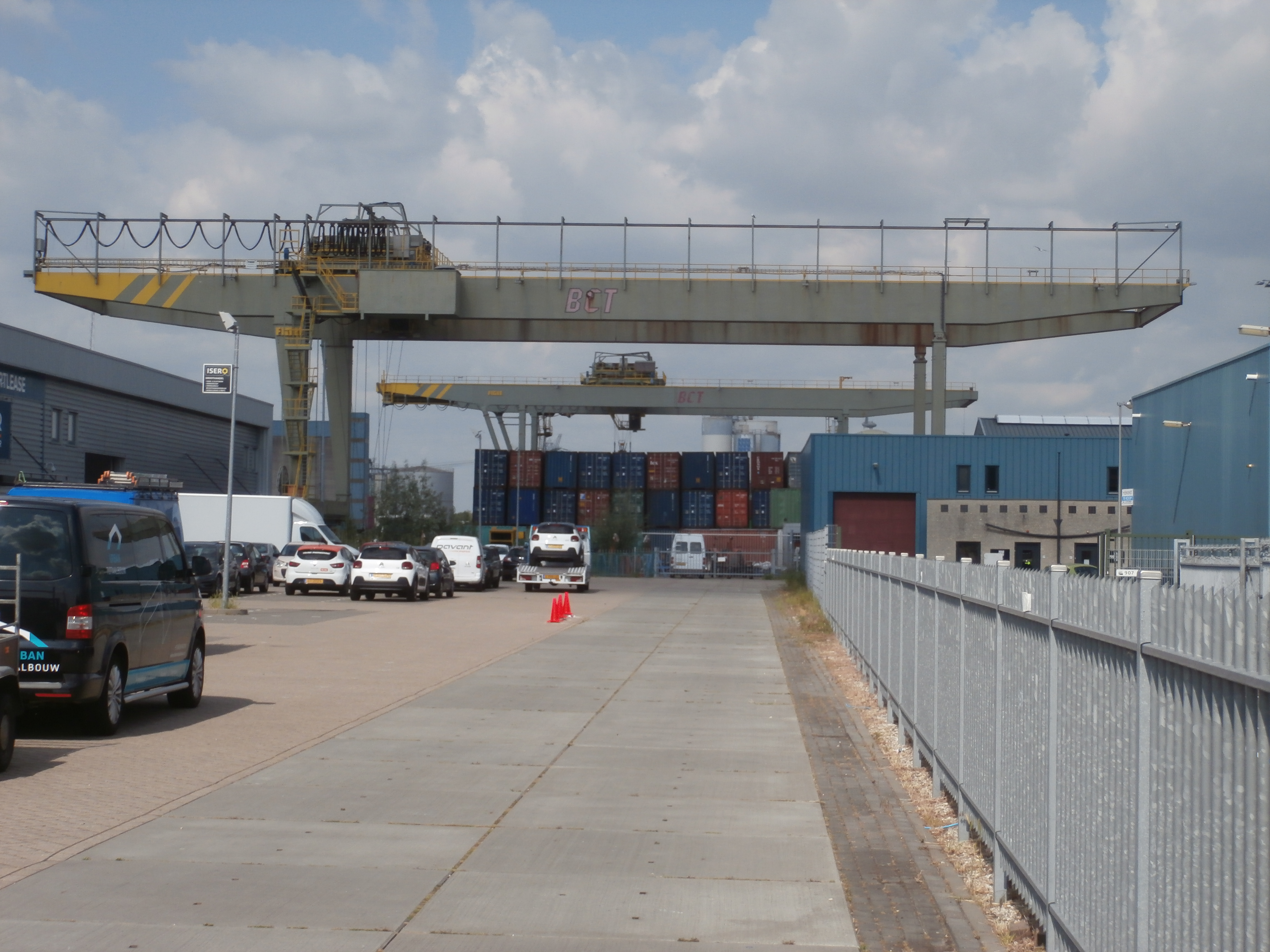
Bossche Container Terminal (BCT)

Nowadays, the commercial harbor of 's-Hertogenobosch is situated on the Dieze, a bit west of the city center. It was founded in the mid-1920s as part of an industrial area, and used for transporting all kinds of bulk products. In 1955 the Heineken company established one of her two Dutch breweries on this terrain. Like most inland harbors, 's-Hertogenbosch harbor steadily lost terrain to road transport after world war II. Heineken however, has a strategic (cost) interest in being able to use transport over water. In 's-Hertogenbosch the brewery uses e.g. 100,000 tons of malt each year, which all arrives by ship.

When containers came in general use, there were doubts about whether a container terminal would be viable in 's-Hertogenbosch, because it was so close to the port of Rotterdam. Heineken was very interested, because it exported containers with bottled beer. It wanted to fill these containers at the brewery, instead of at Rotterdam or Antwerp. It was one of the partners that succeeded in establishing the Bossche Container Terminal (BCT) in December 1995. The container terminal became a success, and led to the expansion of other logistics companies in the harbor. Later competing projects were set up in Veghel and Waalwijk.

A group of related activities that persists in the harbor has to do with the transport of raw materials for construction. E.g. the production of concrete and the transport of asphalt and gravel. Other companies are active in the transport of fodder, and in waste disposal.

=== Village Engelen ===
The village of Engelen at the start of the Dieze Canal has a quay. Meerwijk Castle is situated opposite Engelen on the other shore of the Dieze. It is a manor built in Tudor Revival architecture style.

=== The Dieze Canal ===
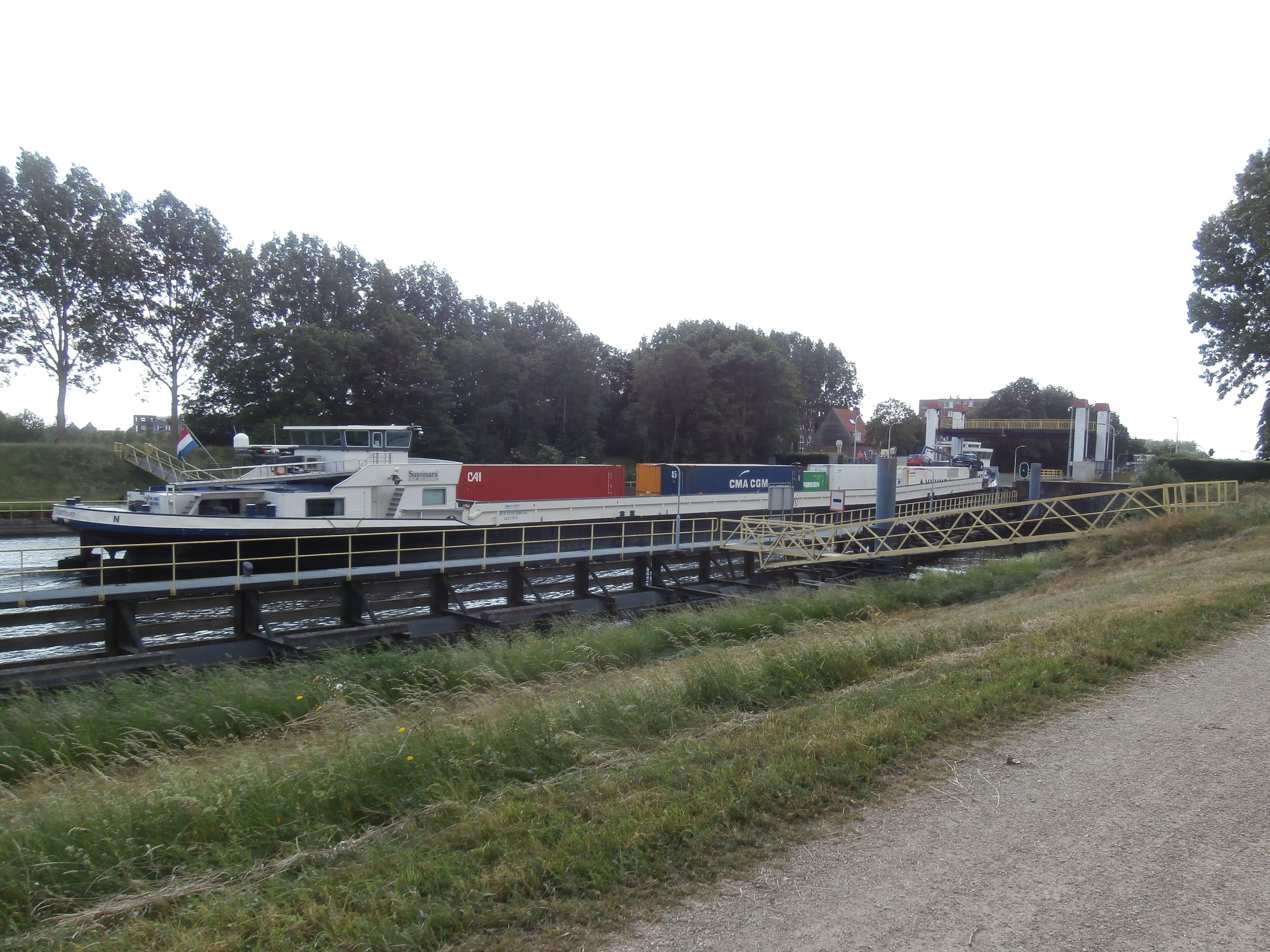
Ship enters Engelen Lock

The Dieze Canal runs from Engelen to the Meuse. The Dieze canal contains Engelen Lock, previously named Henriëttesluis. This lock had between 20,000 and 40,000 passages in 2008. Maximum size for ships that use the lock is 90 m long by 12 m beam. After the opening of the Maximakanaal in December 2014, the Dieze became less busy. The lock was transferred to the province of North Brabant, because it was no longer on a 'national' route. However, the Dieze canal is still important for shipping.

=== The Dieze east of the canal ===
After the Dieze canal has been split off from the Dieze at Engelen, the natural Dieze continues to the north. Before Crèvecoeur it splits in a branch that ran straight through the fortress, and a branch that turns left, called Oude Dieze ('old Dieze'), circumventing Crèvecoeur. At the start of the Oude Dieze there is a sluice that regulates the water level on the Dieze, and further upstream. The natural river therefore still processes more water than the wider Dieze canal.

== Gallery ==
=== Dieze, north of 's-Hertogenbosch ===
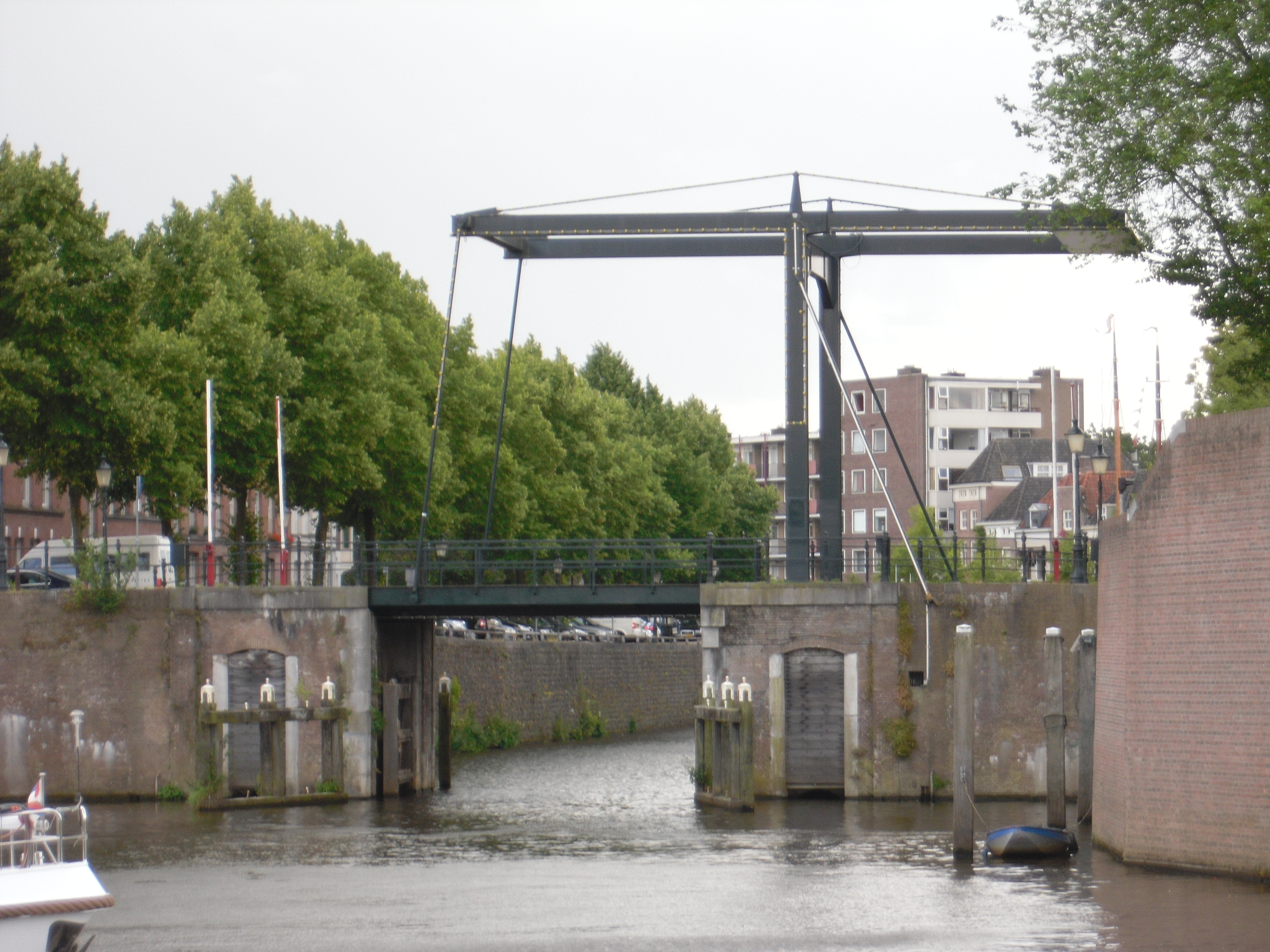
The bridge at the city harbor can be considered as start of the Dieze

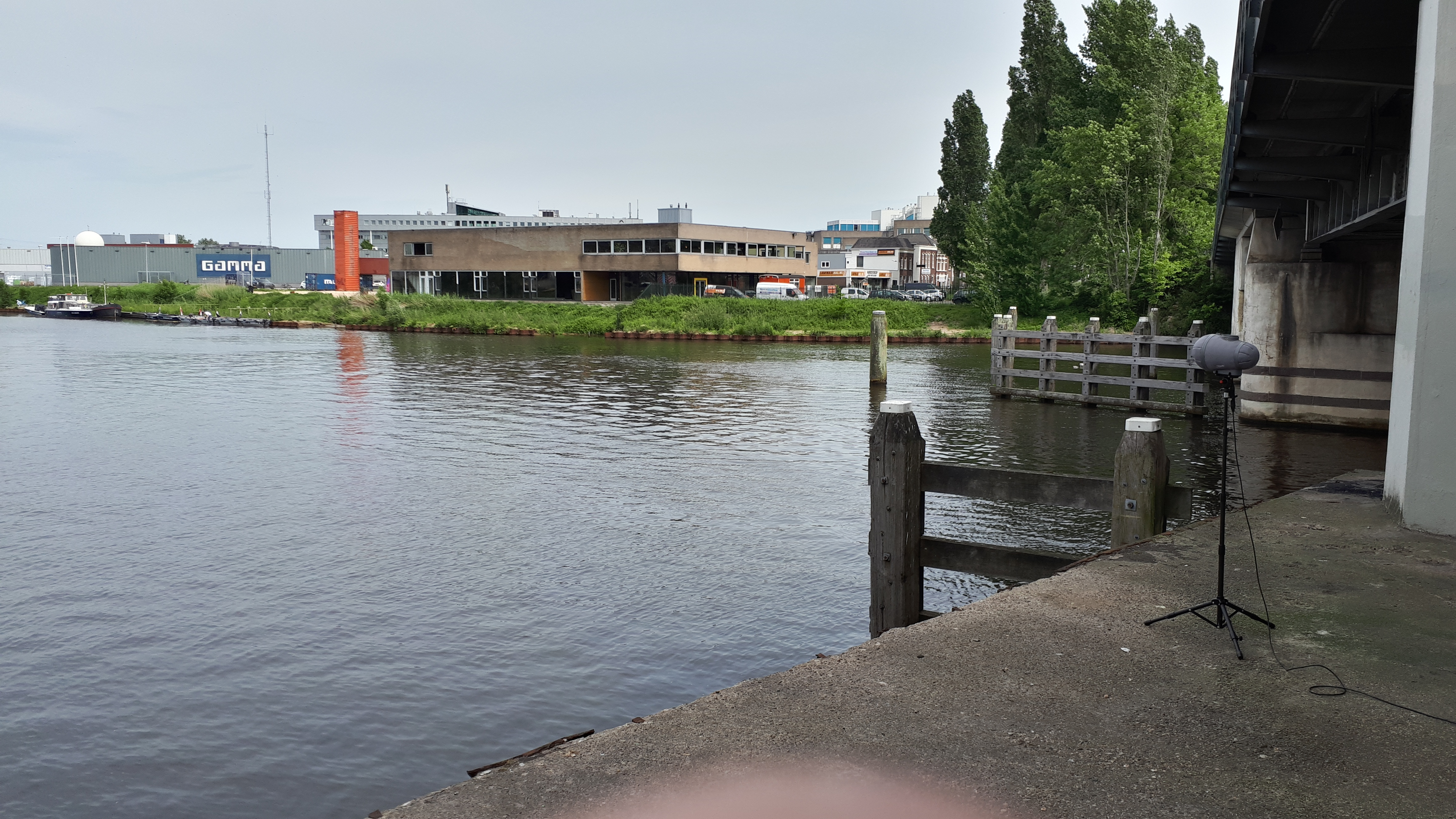
The Dieze from her confluence with the Aa at the Orthenseweg

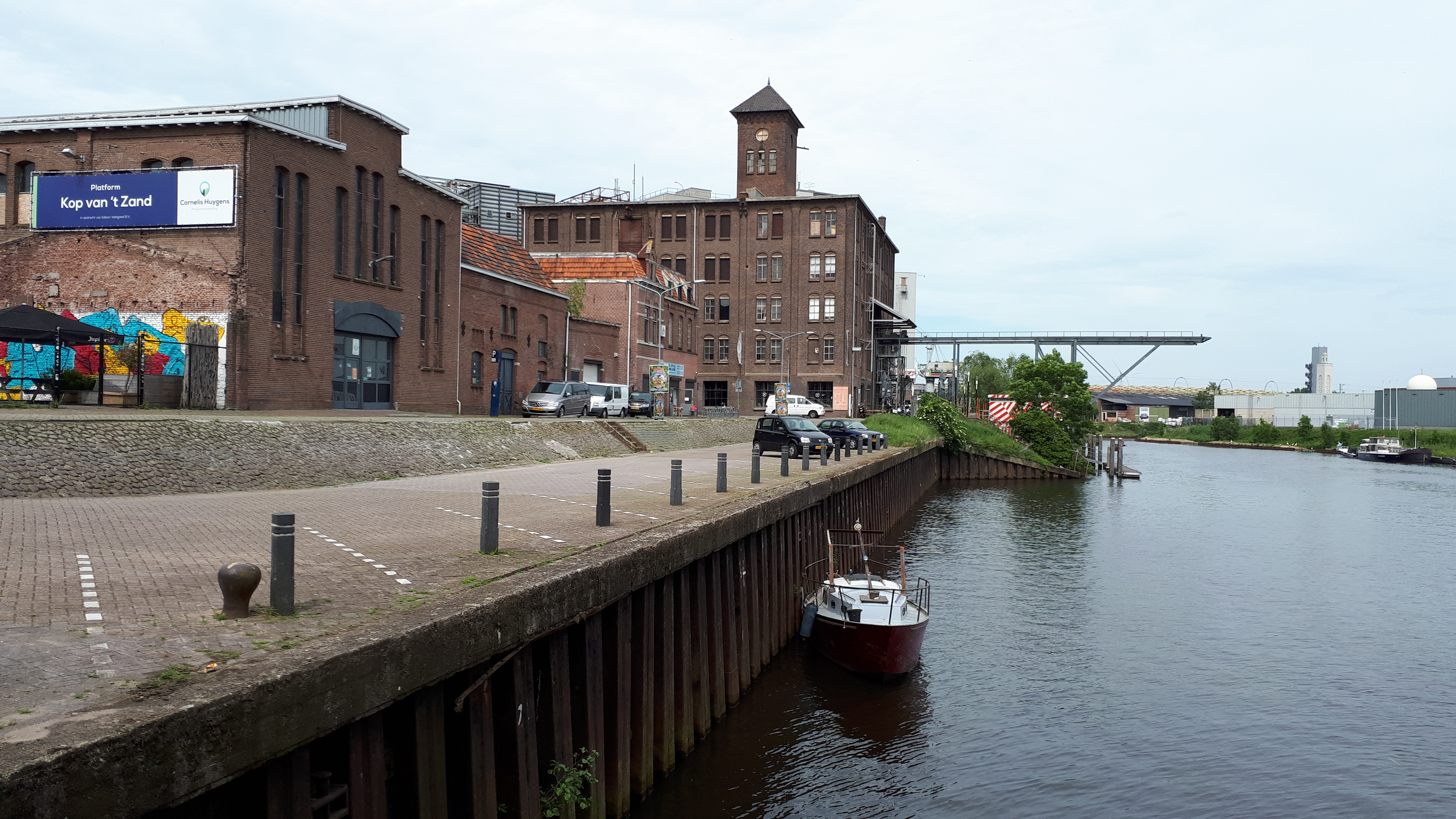
Quay of the Dieze near Tramkade

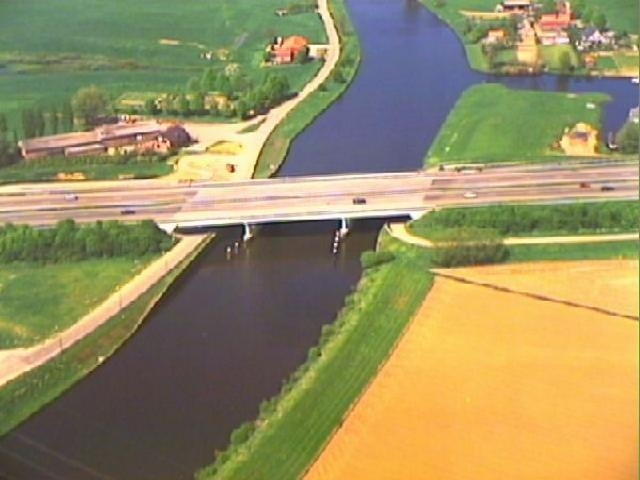
Bridge of the A 59 over the Dieze

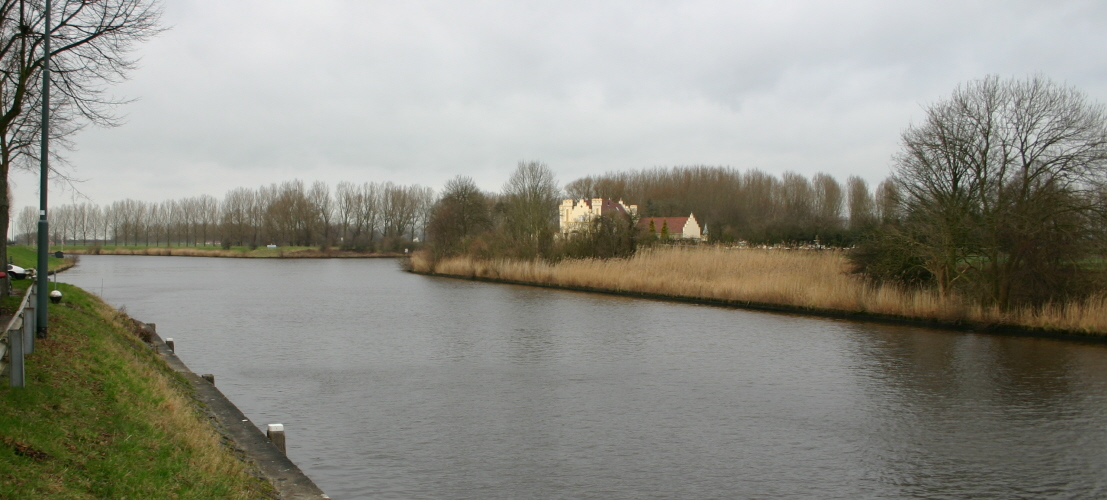
Dieze in Engelen

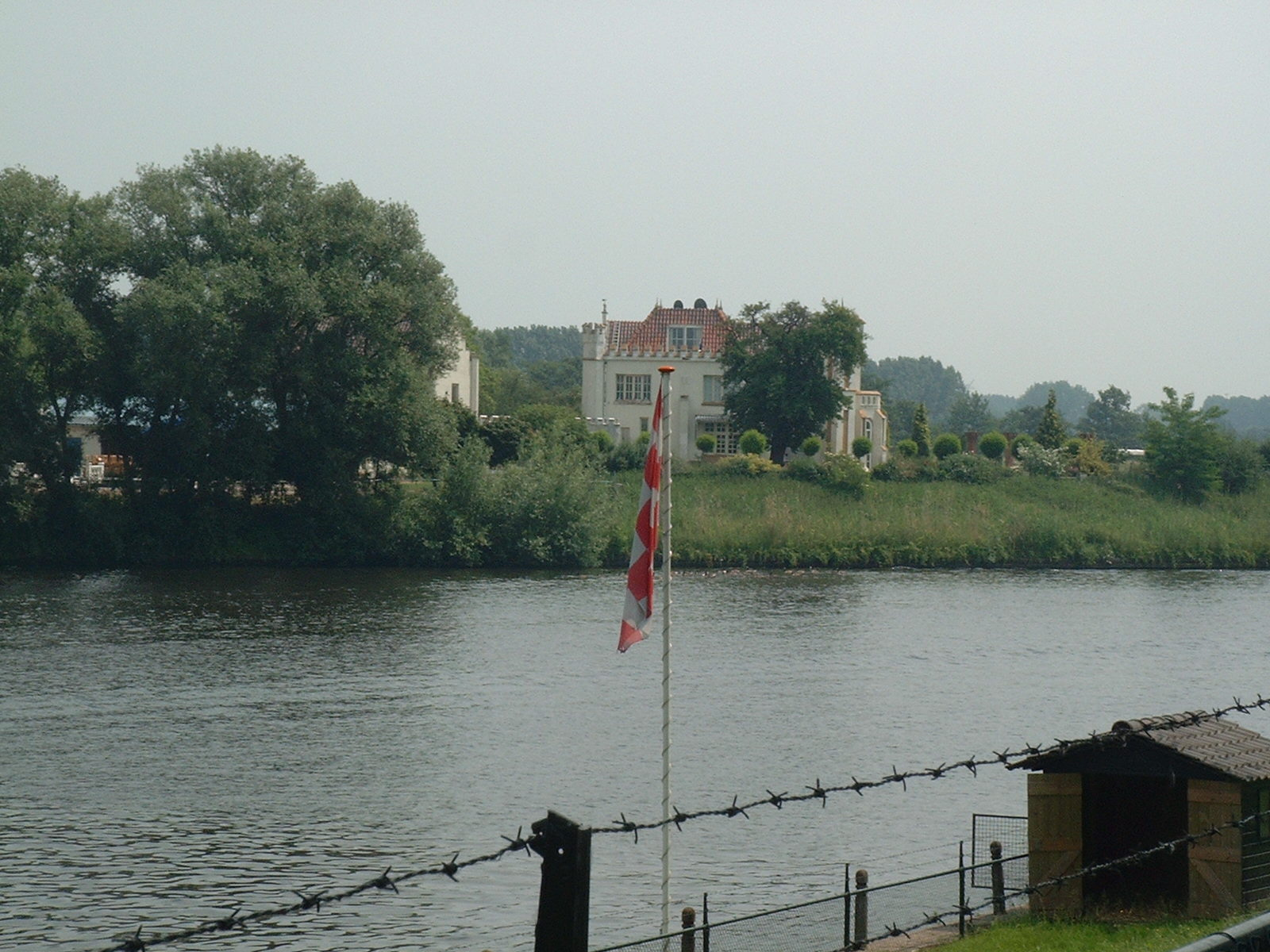
Meerwijk Castle on the east bank of the Dieze
