= Zuid-Willemsvaart =

Canal in the Netherlands

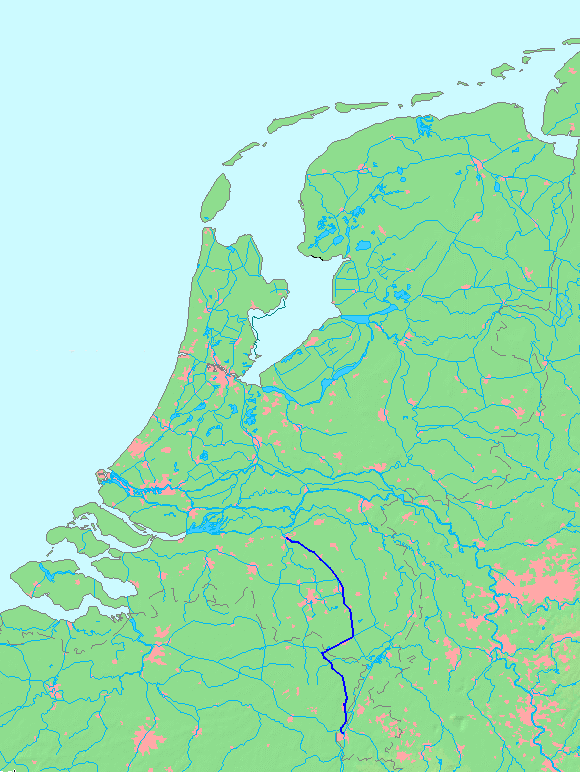
- Map of the Zuid-Willemsvaart
- Interactive map of Zuid-Willemsvaart
- Country: Netherlands, Belgium

Specifications
- Length: 121.9 km (75.7 miles)
- Locks: 21 Originally
- Status: Open

History
- Date completed: 1826

Geography
- Start point: Bassin, Maastricht
- End point: Dieze, 's-Hertogenbosch
- Beginning coordinates: 50.856618°N 5.691782°E
- Ending coordinates: 51.695768°N 5.301044°E

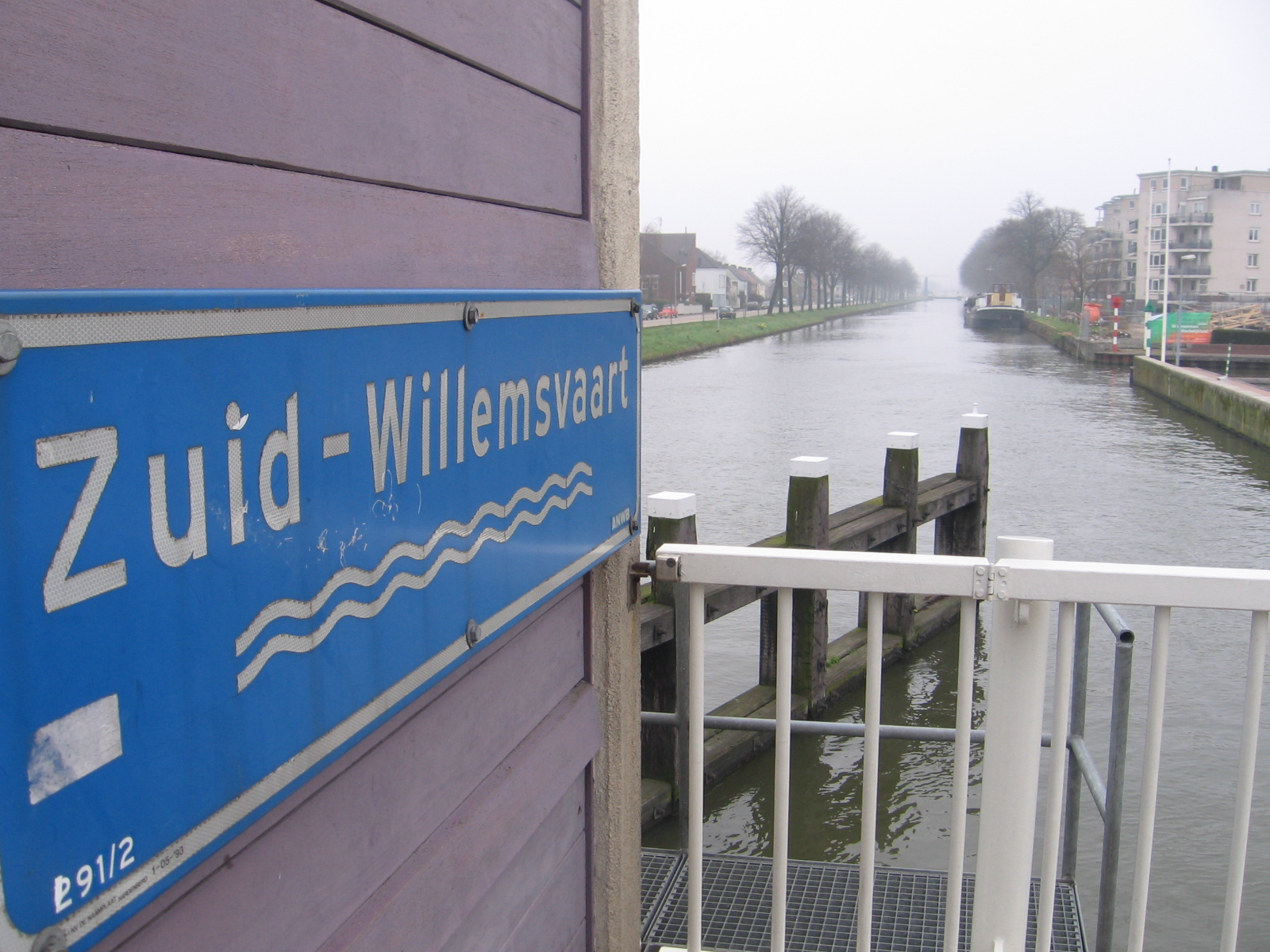
Zuid-Willemsvaart in Weert

The Zuid-Willemsvaart (Dutch: [zœytˈʋɪləmsfaːrt]; translated: South William's Canal) is a canal in the south of the Netherlands and the east of Belgium.

== Route ==
The Zuid-Willemsvaart is a canal in the provinces Limburg (Netherlands), Limburg (Belgium), and North Brabant. Several important canals are connected to it, e.g. the Campine Canals and the Wilhelmina Canal. On its 122 km route it passes cities like Maastricht, Maasmechelen, Bree, Weert, Helmond, and 's-Hertogenbosch. Nowadays most commercial shipping activity on the canal is local.

== History ==
=== Plans ===
Previous to the construction of the Zuid-Willemsvaart, there were many plans for making a canal from 's-Hertogenbosch towards the Belgian border. Most of these centered on canalizing the Aa, the stream bed of which is closely followed by the Zuid-Willemsvaart for most of its route. The geographical proximity to the Aa indicates a relation between these older plans and the construction of the Zuid-Willemsvaart, but the relation is only in the suitability of the drainage basin of the Aa for digging most of the Zuid-Willemsvaart.

When the United Kingdom of the Netherlands was founded in 1815, its commercial center was formed by the harbors in the west, but its industrial center was near Liège. Communication between the two over the Meuse was difficult until the funds to create a canal became available. The Zuid-Willemsvaart was planned as a shortcut of the river Meuse between the cities of Maastricht and 's-Hertogenbosch. It shortened the distance of shipping traffic from 233 km to 122 km, but that was not a primary goal of constructing the canal. The canal was dug with little regard for connecting local communities.

The problem of the Meuse river was the relatively big height difference upwards of Venlo. This was 34 cm/km, or three times that of the Rhine near Emmerich. It caused that in summer there was often too little water in the Meuse for shipping. And in the winter there was often so much water that navigation became dangerous. Towing ships or barges upriver was difficult in all seasons. A canal that cut corners and went through a more flat terrain would be a far more reliable waterway. It would always have enough water and would allow easy transport upstream.

=== Design ===
On 23 February 1818 Inspector General A.F. Goudriaan got orders to design the canal from Maastricht to 's-Hertogenbosch. On 15 May 1819 he presented his design. It called for a canal of 2.1 m deep, 10 m wide at the floor and 18 m wide on the water level. Practical draught for ships would be 188 cm. On the first stretch between Maastricht and the lock at Hocht, this draught would later be only 157 cm in case of draught. The canal would have 19 locks. Each with a passage width of 7 m and a length of at least 50 m.

=== Naming ===
In this perspective, the naming of the canal after King William I of the Netherlands on 11 November 1822 is justified. "South" was added to avoid confusion with two other canals commissioned by and named after the king: the Willemskanaal near Zwolle and the Noord-Willemskanaal in Groningen province. The naming happened on 11 November 1822, when the first stone of the constructions on the canal (locks, bridges etc.) was laid in 's-Hertogenbosch at Lock 1 Sluis 1. This was done by the governor of Limburg.

=== Initial Construction ===
The first part of the canal that was constructed, was the part from 's-Hertogenbosch to Veghel, and from there to Helmond. This part was tendered on 10 April 1822. The digging was offered in six lots. Between 's-Hertogenbosch and Veghel it was to have three or four locks and a number of drawbridges and culverts. In November 1822 the construction of Lock 1 in 's-Hertogenbosch was started (cf. above).

The second part ran from Helmond to a point on the road between Someren and Asten. On 19 March 1823 digging this stretch was offered in two lots, and was tendered together with three locks on the already dug out stretch between Veghel and Helmond, and the drawbridges and culverts on that stretch. Also in 1823, a third part was tendered on 25 March. It was tendered in two lots and consisted of the already present waterway below Smeermaas, through the Caberg to the fortress of Maastricht.

In 1824 a fourth, fifth and sixth part were tendered. The fourth part stretched from the road between Someren and Asten to the provincial boundary between North Brabant and Limburg. It was tendered on 25 February 1824, together with 6 locks between Helmond and the provincial boundary as well as a drawbridge and culverts. On 2 March 1824 the fifth part was tendered. This consisted of: Digging the canal from the provincial boundary to its junction with the former Noorderkanaal, or Grand Canal du Nord. The renovation of the Grand Canal du Nord on the stretch that was part of the Zuid-Willemsvaart, and the construction or completion of some of its infrastructure. Building six locks, 10 drawbridges and a number of culverts. On 16 March 1824 a sixth part was tendered. It consisted of: Digging the basin, or city harbor in Maastricht, with a lock on the Meuse. Executing a lot of works to lead the canal through the fortification of Maastricht, including three tunnels through the walls, and towards the basin.

On 14 September 1825 the construction of the canal through 's-Hertogenbosch was tendered. This also included the construction of three bridges inside the city. A flood lock was planned on the eastern city walls. It had the peculiar characteristic of being mainly planned to cause or maintain a flood, instead of preventing it. However, the technique was the same as that of a flood lock. It was also a double flood lock, and therefore it could be used to lift ships, which came in handy if it caused or maintained a flood. However, in normal circumstances the flood lock would be open, and therefore it was not in the numbered list of locks. When it later began to permanently function as a lock, it was named Sluis 0, or Lock 0, because it was just downstream of Lock 1.

=== Opening ===
The canal was opened in Maastricht on 24 August 1826. The opening was done by the governor of Limburg. After a speech, the dignitaries sailed down the canal to Smeermaas and disembarked near Hocht. They then continued to Pietersheim Manor (Kasteel Pietersheim) by carriage. After a splendid dinner the company arrived back in the basin of Maastricht near 8 o'clock in the evening. Meanwhile, many festivities for the population had taken place. At 10 o'clock in the evening the ball for the upper class started. It featured loaded tables, and continued until the early morning.

=== The nineteenth century ===
The canal created new possibilities for development of the poor towns on the sandy grounds of North Brabant. In Helmond a textile manufacturing industry was developed. In Veghel the harbor attracted several industries. In Weert many fir were planted after transport to Maastricht and Liège became feasible. In many villages of North-Brabant it also became profitable to rear cattle for customers outside the province.

One of the first activities on the canal was a regular service for passengers and freight between 's-Hertogenbosch and Maastricht. The journey took two days, with an overnight stay in Weert.

=== Belgian independence ===
The secession of the southern portion of the country in 1830 created an unexpected situation: the canal was closed for cross-border traffic. It led to a prolonged closure, but on 22 June 1839 the first barge with a Belgian flag arrived in Helmond from Liège. It was loaded with iron goods and roof shingles. In 1841 over 4,000 ships and barges passed the canal.

In 1846 the Eindhovensch Kanaal was opened. It connected Eindhoven to the canal just below Helmond. In the 1850s irrigation works in the Belgian Campine and surroundings dramatically increased the flow of water to the Zuid-Willemsvaart. This led to the water actually flowing over the lock doors of the canal.

=== Wessem-Nederweert Canal ===
In the 1920s the Wessem-Nederweert Canal was constructed. It starts at the Meuse near Wessem, and connects to the Zuid-Willemsvaart just south of Nederweert, where the Zuid-Willemsvaart makes a 90 degree turn to the southwest. During construction, lock 14 and lock 15, north of the junction were demolished. A new Lock 15 was built just west of the junction, and a lock was built at the western end of the Noordervaart. The new lock 15 bridged a rise of 4.85 m. Lock 16, southwest of Weert was renovated. Both locks got an increased passage width of 7.50 m instead of 7 m. The cill of the locks was laid deeper, at 2.50 m below canal level. In 1964 there was more traffic on the Wessem-Nederweert Canal than on any part of the Zuid-Willemsvaart.

== Modernization ==
=== Plans to modernize the canal ===
Already in the early 1960s there were plans to upgrade the canal. There was no intention to execute these plans on short notice, but some aspects were determined in order to ease later implementation.

=== Situation of the canal in 1974 ===
In 1974 an overview of traffic on the canal was made by collecting shipping data of Sluis 0 in 's-Hertogenbosch, and of Sluis 13, somewhat south of Someren, near Limburg. Overall, it showed that from 1960 to 1974 the number of ships had decreased, while the total amount of cargo had remained the same.

At Sluis 0, almost all upstream vessels were loaded. By 1974 the vast majority unloaded at Veghel, some continued to Helmond, and only a tiny fraction continued further upstream with cargo. At Sluis 0 downstream cargo had decreased from about 5,000 vessels in 1960 to only a few hundred loaded vessels in 1974. At Sluis 13 the reverse was true. Here almost all vessels heading north were loaded. Most went to the Wilhelmina Canal and only some to Veghel. At Sluis 13 most of the upstream vessels were empty.

The overview showed that not many ships travelled the entire canal. Most of them went from the Meuse near 's-Hertogenbosch to Veghel or Helmond and then returned. A smaller amount came from the Meuse in Limburg, sailed to the Wilhelmina Canal, and then returned. Furthermore, not much cargo was loaded along the Zuid-Willemsvaart.

As regards the future of transport on the canal, the conclusion was that Water transport had successfully maintained its position against increased competition by road transport. This had been done by increasing productivity, i.e. ship size and engine power. A clear limit to a further increase were the number and size of the original locks, and the small width (profile) of the canal.

In 1975 the idea was that after modernization, the average size of vessels would double in twenty years. Transport speed would be increased by replacing the many old locks with a limited number of large modern locks. All this would lower transport cost, and again make the Zuid-Willemsvaart suitable as a shortcut of the Meuse.

=== The Helmond detour (1981-1993) ===
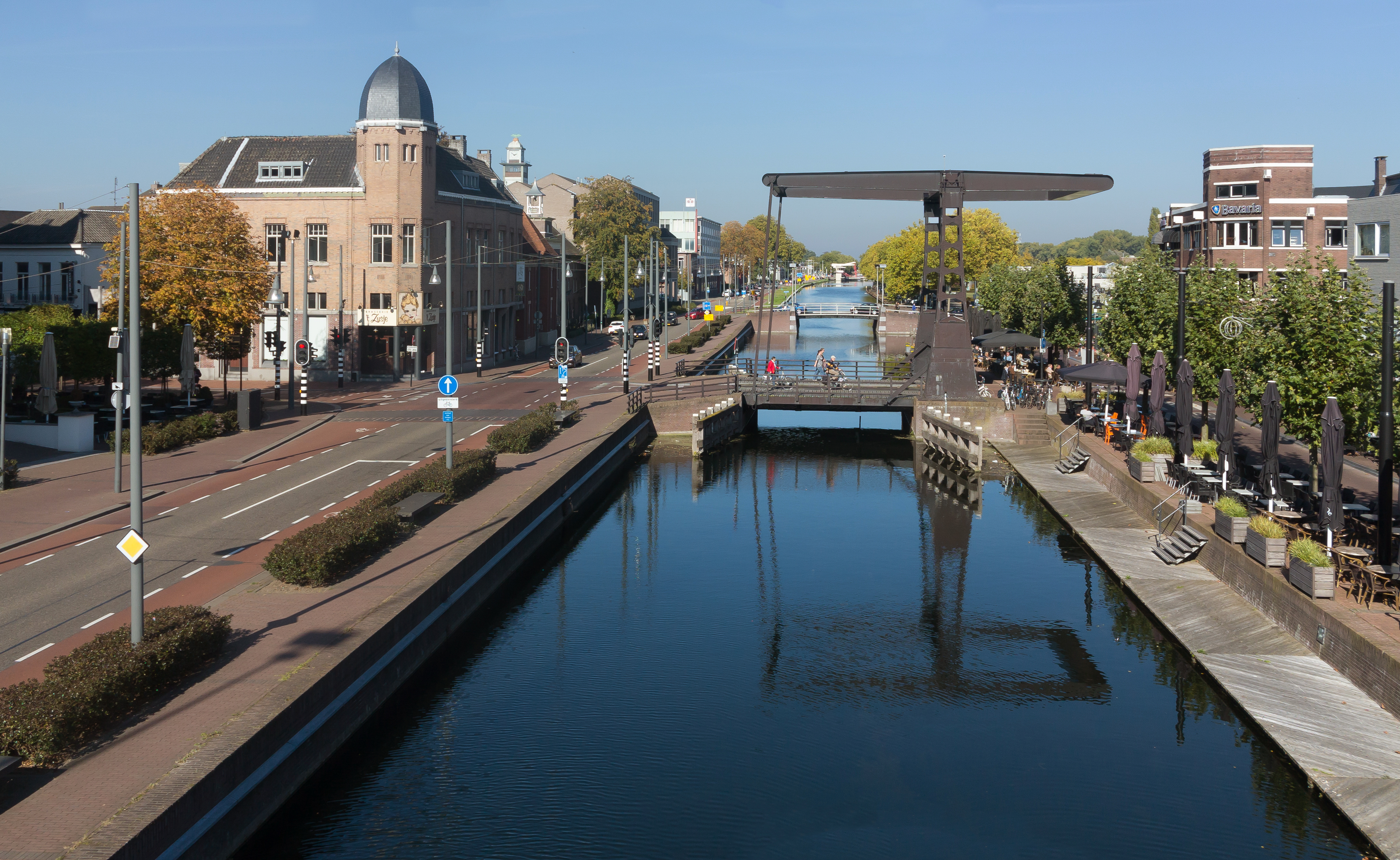
The old section in Helmond

In Helmond the canal had been dug just west of the town's center. In 1957 20,000 vessels passed Sluis 7 (Lock 7) and the center of Helmond. By 1960, motorized road traffic had quadrupled in ten years. It caused chaos near the bridges over the canal. These had to be opened often, and were anyhow unsuitable for the increased traffic. Rijkswaterstaat then made a plan to create a new course for the canal east of Helmond. The detour was about as long as the previous course, and though it was planned to start north of lock 9, in the end it would start south of it.

The Helmond detour would be constructed first. It would lead to the strange situation that for many years the Helmond detour was the widest part of the canal, but was unreachable for larger vessels. The logic was that the existing section through Helmond could not be upgraded, and solving the road traffic problem in Helmond could not be postponed as long as the general upgrade of the canal. Therefore, the decision about the Helmond detour was taken while the options for other parts of the canal remained open In May 1971 the route of the detour was determined.

Other considerations to construct the detour were that it would bypass Locks 7, 8 and 9. Technological advances allowed their replacement by a single lock, Sluis Helmond (Lock Helmond). Also the many crossings over the new section could be constructed so high that they would not have to be opened to allow ships to pass. All this would save much time for ships, and make transport over water more competitive.

Work on the Helmond detour started on 11 December 1981. By 1986 the overall project to upgrade the Zuid-Willemsvaart was delayed by financial difficulties, and budget overruns on e.g. the Oosterscheldekering. However, the detour was still planned to be finished in 1993. By 1988, while about 100 of the 160 million guilder cost had already been spent, the government wanted to delay the opening until 1995. In 1990 construction of the Helmond Lock started. In the end, the detour was opened on 11 December 1993.

=== 's-Hertogenbosch - Veghel section (1990-1995) ===
By 1988 the overall maintenance situation of the canal was problematic. Locks 2 until 13 still dated from the construction time of the canal, and looked extremely bad. Most of the lock chambers were kept together by metal sheeting to diminish the risk of collapse. A risk analysis showed increased wear and tear of the locks, and more collisions, because ships had become so much larger and used ever stronger engines. The situation was most serious at Lock 3, just east of where the current road between Schijndel and Heeswijk crosses the canal. A passing ship was reported to have lost an hour using the lock, because its skipper had to be so careful.

In October 1982 the government decided to widen the Zuid-Willemsvaart up to NederWeert, the Wessem Nederweert Canal, and the Wilhelmina Canal between Son and Tilburg to CEMT class IV. A 1985 plan to realize this gave priority to the replacement of Locks 2 and 3 by a new lock near Schijndel. This was motivated by the bad condition of all the old locks, and the severe damage that would result if the busy section between 's-Hertogenbosch and Veghel would be blocked by a failure of these locks. In 1986 the plan was postponed.

In February 1990 minister Hanja Maij-Weggen planned to use the funding allotted for the canal to build the Maeslantkering instead. For North-Brabant province and the House of Representatives this was unacceptable. Local companies had already invested about 10 million guilders to improve their facilities in anticipation of the widening, and 30 million had already been granted for Schijndel Lock from an environmental budget. Their actions proved effective. In the second half of 1990 construction of Schijndel Lock was underway. Schijndel Lock was taken into use in 1995.

=== Veghel - Nederweert (2003-2007) ===
Even while the important section up to Veghel was getting upgraded to Class IV, plans for the central section between Veghel and Nederweert again came under discussion. in 1997 plans were made that would upgrade this section, which included the Helmond detour, to class III instead of class IV. In the end Sluis 4, 5 and 6 would get the same size lock chamber as Schijndel Lock, i.e. 110 * 12.6 m. Normal depth would be 3.5 m. Construction of these three locks started in 2008.

Upstream of the Helmond detour, locks 10 - 13 were replaced earlier. The replacement of Lock 11 and Lock 13 by longer locks was finished in 2003. Locks 10 and 12 were replaced in 2007.

=== The 's-Hertogenbosch detour / Máxima Canal (2007-2014) ===
The section of the canal which ran through the city center of 's-Hertogenbosch posed a serious problem for the plans to upgrade the canal. It was situated in an area with very much street traffic, and was surrounded by buildings on both sides. There were three options: Widening the existing section; digging a detour around the city; and upgrading the Wilhelmina Canal. The latter runs from the Meuse through Oosterhout and Tilburg to a point just north of Helmond, where it meets the northern end of the Helmond detour. In the end it was decided to dig a detour around 's-Hertogenbosch. Construction of the Máxima Canal started in 2007, and was completed in 2014.

== Ships ==
=== The Meuse ship ===
In the mid-nineteenth century some calculations for shipping on the Meuse were given by the manager of the mines of SA John Cockerill. He gave an example of shipping between Liège and Venlo over the Meuse. A Meuse ship Maasschip had an empty draught of 23 cm, and had a cargo space of about 150-160 ton (tonnage). This meant that it could load about 100 wagonloads of coal. With 100 wagonloads of coal on board, the Meuse ship had a draught of 110–120 cm. If the water was only three feet deep, the ship could only carry 75 wagonloads. With 20 inch (57.5 cm) of water the ship could carry only 45 wagonloads. Therefore, a lower water level could raise the cargo price from 7.30 to 16.30 Belgian francs per wagonload.

A wagonload of coal might be estimated at 800 kg. One wagonload contained 10-12 muds of coal. A mud of coal was 100 liter, weighing about 72 kg, so 11*72~800. This also allows to compute the cargo capacity of the Meuse ship of the example at about 80,000 kg, or 80 tonnes (100*800). The example ship is in line with the statement that ships on the Meuse measured 40-200 ton with a draught of 94–188 cm, with the biggest rarely sailing further upstream than Venlo.

An example that shows the importance of transport cost for coal, dates from 1862. In Gent 1,000 kg of Belgian coal then cost 24 francs including transport. Ruhr coal was cheaper at 20 francs. It was bought for 6 francs at the Ruhr, and transported to Gent via the Rhine, Dordrecht and the Ghent–Terneuzen Canal for 13-14 francs.

=== The Zuid-Willemsvaart ship ===
The maximum size of ships that could navigate the Zuid-Willemsvaart was said to be bigger than that of a Meuse ship. For some time this was probably a general statement, indicating that in normal circumstances, ships of 188 cm draught could use the canal, but could not sail the Meuse upwards of Venlo. However, it is reasonable to suppose that in time, shipping lines designed ships that could take maximum advantage of the canal.

In 1858 a statement about shipping on the canal said that two-thirds of the ships on the canal were smaller than 130-150 ton, and were drawn by one horse. One third was larger than 150 ton, and was mostly drawn by two horses. Finally, there were 5 or 6 ships of 300-400 ton, drawn by three horses. Perhaps the up to 150 ton ships were built to the old model, while the over 150 and over 300 ton ships had been built for use on the canal.

=== CEMT class II (Up to 2014) ===
Nothing much was done to modernize the canal after it had been constructed. Some changes were made to the locks, but their maximum passage width remained the same. In 1975 the canal was suitable for ships of CEMT class II, but with a maximum draft of only 1.90 m. This translated to ships with a cargo capacity of 600 tons, of which only 450 tons could be used due to the depth restrictions of the canal.

The size limits of the canal only became problematic after World War II. In 1960 the average cargo capacity of ships on the canal was 190 ton. By 1974 this average was 325 tons. Details at Sluis 0 showed that by this time vessels of up to 200 tons were becoming obsolete. From 1968 to 1975 their number at Sluis 0 decreased by two-thirds.

=== CEMT class II/IV (2014) ===
In 1982 the government decided to widen the Zuid-Willemsvaart up to NederWeert, and the connecting Wessem Nederweert Canal to CEMT class IV. Helmond Lock was opened in 1993, and Schijndel Lock was taken into use in 1995. Schijndel Lock has a lock chamber with useful dimensions of 110 * 12.50 m. Normal depth at the lower gate is 3.80 m. These first steps had little effect. Near the Meuse Engelen Lock limited the length of ships to 90 m. In 's-Hertogenbosch Sluis 0, still had the original passage width of only 6.8 m, and a depth of 2.1 m. For the moment, the advantage of these works was therefore limited to a substantial increase in allowed length, and a small increase in the allowed draft, of ships using the canal. The opening of the Máxima Canal in December 2014, actually allowed ships of CEMT class IV to use the canal up to Veghel.

In 2014 the situation south of Veghel was that Lock 4, 5 and 6 were suitable for CEMT class IV, but the canal itself was not. Now a different solution came up, which consisted of up to 110 m long combinations. One was the pusher (boat) with two inline barges before it. The other the koppelverband of two class II ships, which could transport 900 tons, instead of the previous 450 tons maximum. With only a few changes the canal up to the crossing with the Wilhelmina Canal was made suitable for these kind of ships. The same changes were applied westward to the Wilhelmina canal up to the Beatrix Canal, and to the Beatrix Canal itself.
