= Johann Andreas Dieze =

Johann Andreas Dieze (Leipzig, 1729 - Mainz, September 25, 1785) was a German Hispanist, translator and librarian.

He translated into German the work of Luis José Velázquez Orígenes de la poesía castellana.
