= Engelen =

Coordinates: 51°43′N 5°16′E

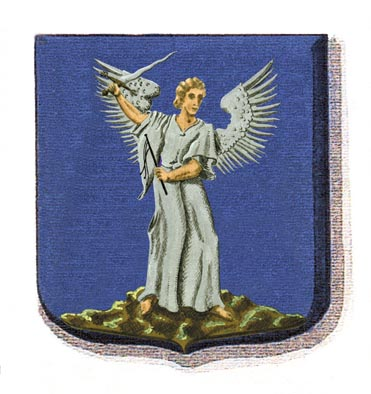
- Flag Coat of arms

- Country: Netherlands
- Province: North Brabant
- Municipality: 's-Hertogenbosch

Population (2008)
  - Total: 5,510
- Major roads: N59
- Website: http://www.dorp-engelen.nl/index1.htm

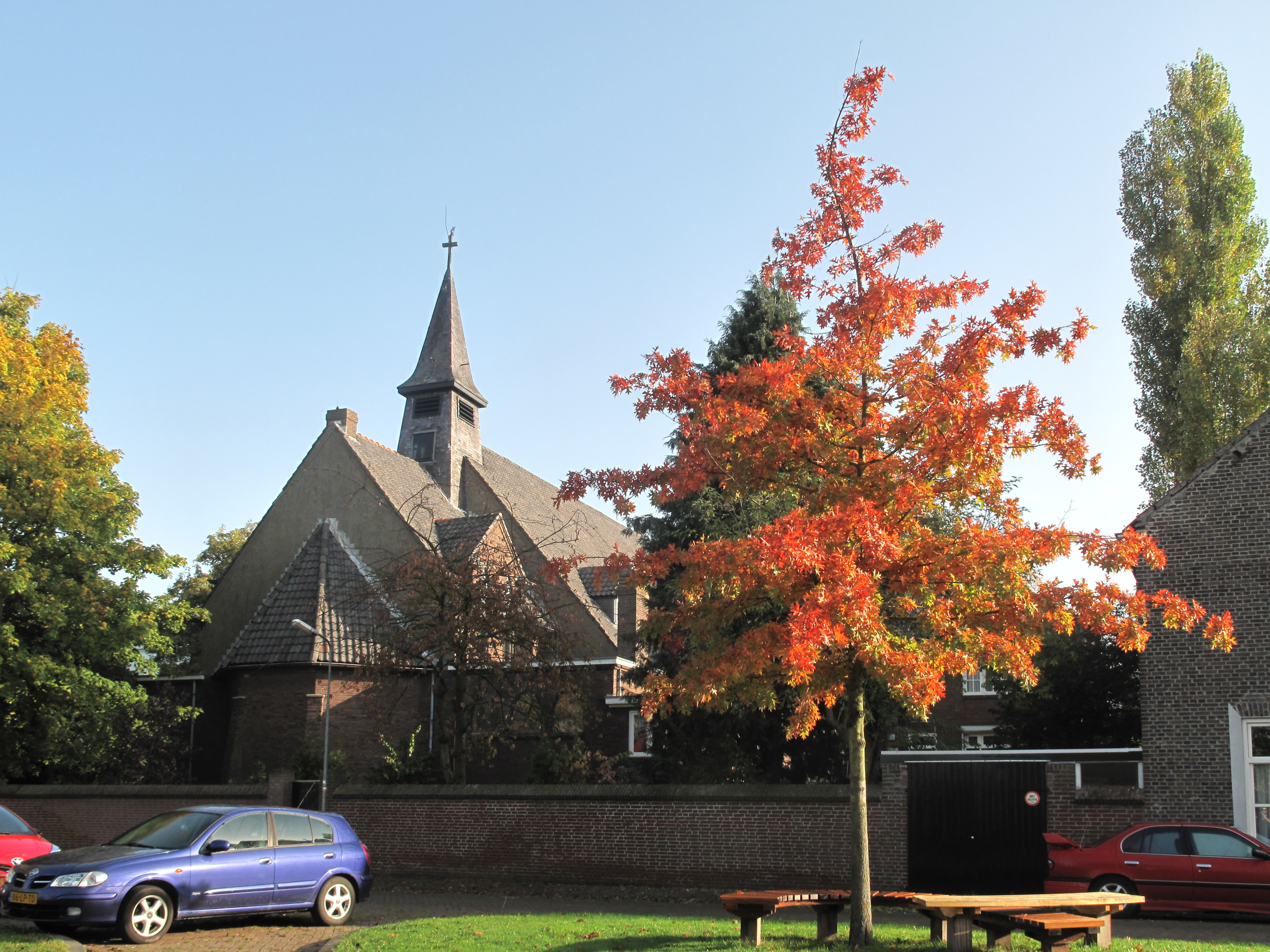
Saint Lambertuschurch

Engelen is a village in the Dutch province of North Brabant. It is part of the municipality of 's-Hertogenbosch.

== Location and plan ==
Engelen is located in the north of North Brabant. It borders the villages Vlijmen and Bokhoven as well as the industrial area De Vutter in `s-Hertogenbosch.

Engelen is divided in several parts. The oldest part consists of the original village. The “new” part consists of the areas that were built before the current expansion took place. The newest part is called plan Haverleij. This consists of castle style housing blocks built around a courtyard / parking lot. Haverleij also includes an 18-hole golf course from Burg Golf. Haverleij borders Engelen Lock on the Dieze Canal. De Haverleij is also closer connecting Engelen to Bokhoven and Vlijmen.

One of the things that are typical for Engelen is the Lake of Engelen which is a small lake connected to the village by industrial ground De Vutter. January 4, 2007 Engelen came into the news because of a dead baby being found at the lake, which was left there by her parents, till so far the parents have not yet been found. The baby has been given the name “Engel van het Meer,” which means “Angel of the Lake”, referring to the name Engelermeer. Engelen even has its very own anthem named; Kaas is Baas (en: Cheese is boss)

== Facilities ==
Currently, there are many facilities, for example a sport complex with a tennis club, football club (FC Engelen), and a golf club located in De Haverleij, and also a healthcare facility called “De Lage Leun” including a dentist, chemists, and doctor's post. A main meeting place for people and companies in Engelen is the Engelenburcht, a social meeting place and small event hall where yearly activities for the inhabitants of Engelen, Bokhoven, and De Haverleij are held. A primary school De Matrix and Jenaplanschool Antonius Abt. serves Engelen and surrounding areas.

== History ==
Engelen was a separate municipality between 1821 and 1971, when it was merged with 's-Hertogenbosch.
