= Máxima Canal =

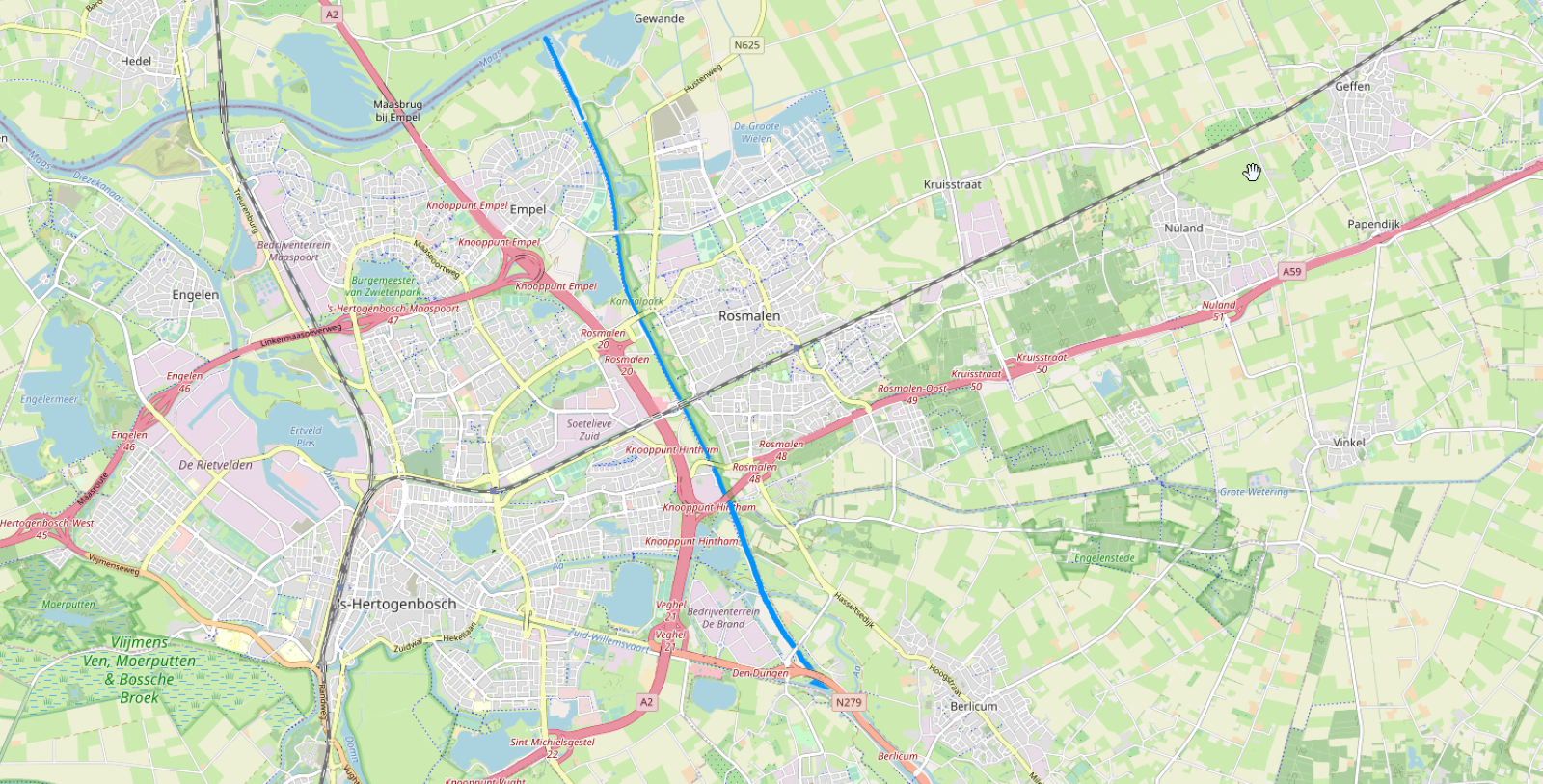
- Map of the Máxima Canal
- Country: Netherlands

Specifications
- Length: 8.2 km (5.1 miles)
- Maximum boat beam: 46.5 m (152 ft 7 in)
- Maximum boat draft: 4.2 m
- Status: Open

History
- Date completed: 2014

Geography
- Start point: Zuid-Willemsvaart
- End point: Meuse
- Beginning coordinates: 51.680189°N 5.374013°E
- Ending coordinates: 51.747546°N 5.327715°E

The Máxima Canal dates from 2014 and runs from the Zuid-Willemsvaart near Den Dungen to the Meuse near Gewande.

== Context ==
The Máxima Canal is also known as the reroute of the Zuid-Willemsvaart or Omlegging van de Zuid-Willemsvaart. In the early nineteenth century the Zuid-Willemsvaart was dug through the northern part of the center of 's-Hertogenbosch. As there were few buildings in the area this was not a problem till the late nineteenth century. At that time, part of the Citadel of 's-Hertogenbosch, and part of the medieval water gate at the city harbor Binnenhaven had to be demolished to make room for bigger ships. This solved the problem for another century. However, as time went by, ships got so big that the Zuid-Willemsvaart could not be enlarged without severely damaging housing or road traffic in 's-Hertogenbosch.

It was clear that something had to be done if the Zuid-Willemsvaart was to continue its existence as a significant waterway. The extent of what was required followed from the national traffic and transport plan Nationaal Verkeers- en Vervoersplan (NVVP). The NVVP designated the Zuid-Willemsvaart from the Meuse to Veghel as being a part of the main network for water transport. This main network has to be navigable for ships of CEMT class IV. In 's-Hertogenbosch the Zuid-Willemsvaart was only fit ships of CEMT class II, about half the size of CEMT class IV. Realization of the NVVP required a drastic measure, which was to make a shortcut from the Zuid-Willemsvaart to the Meuse east of 's-Hertogenbosch.

== Construction ==
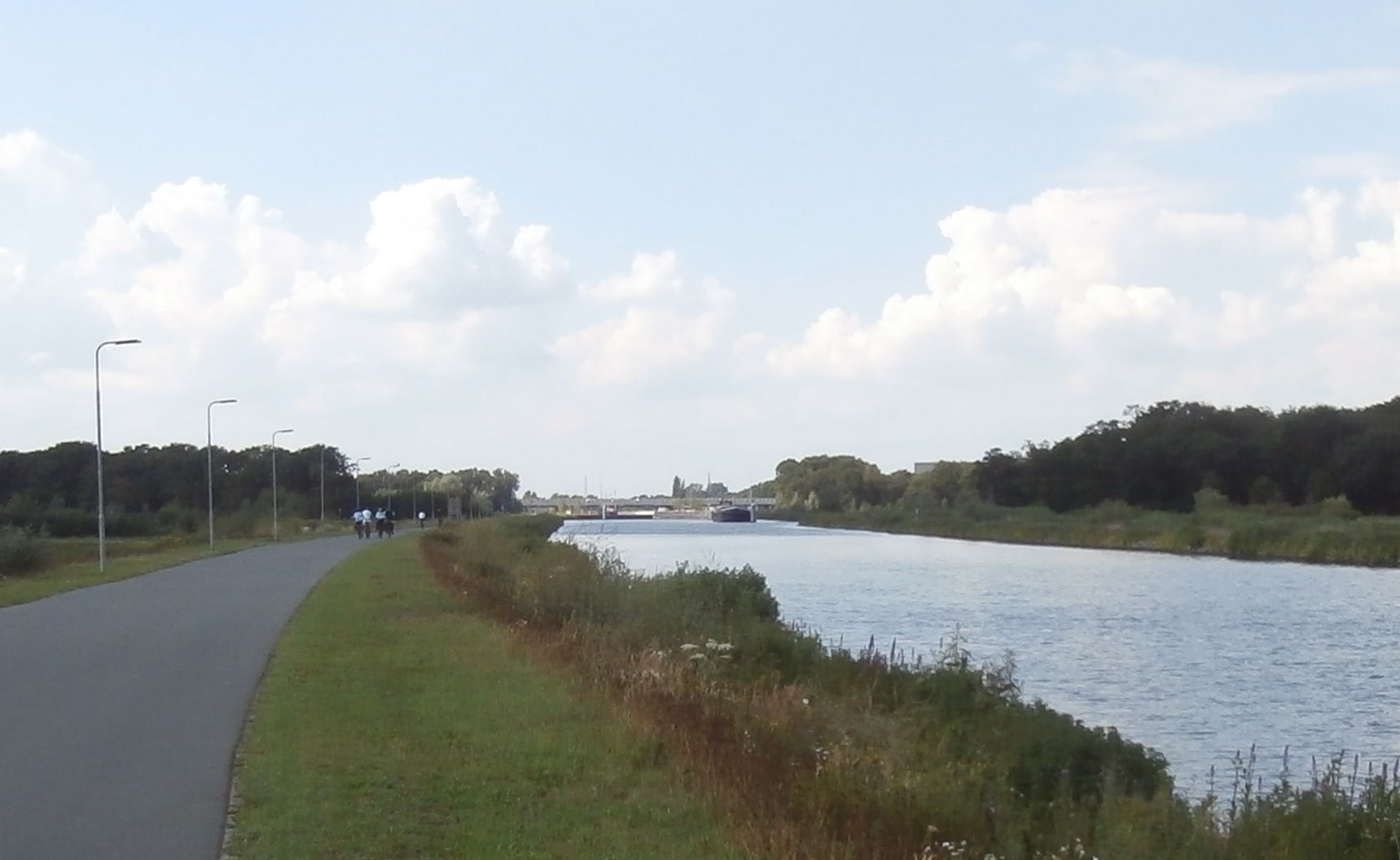
Maxima Canal in 2020 seen towards the north.

Construction of the Máxima Canal started in 2007. The work was executed by the Willemsunie, a combination of the contractors 'Van Hattum en Blankevoort', 'KWS Infra', 'GMB Civiel' and 'Van den Herik Kust- en Oeverwerken'.

The Máxima Canal was opened on 19 December 2014. It spelled the end for commercial use of the Zuid-Willemsvaart in 's-Hertogenbosch. Recreational shipping is still allowed to use the old canal, but has sharply decreased. One of the reasons is that the locks and bridges now operate less frequently.

== Locks ==
Two locks bridge the difference in water level between the Meuse and the Zuid-Willemsvaart:

- Empel lock moves ships from the variable water level of the Meuse to 2 m above Amsterdam Ordnance Datum (Normaal Amsterdams Peil).
- Hintham Lock moves ships from 2 m to 4.7 m above Amsterdam Ordnance Datum.

== Bridges ==
There are eight bridges across the Máxima Canal. They have an air draft of 7 m, enough for ships to load three layers of containers.

== Nature ==
In the Netherlands it is mandatory that major infrastructural works that destroy parts of nature are compensated for by creating new nature. For the Máxima Canal nature was compensated by creating Kanaalpark Rosmalen. It is a nature reserve that includes a new 'river' Rosmalense Aa. This is also an Ecological Connection Zone, or Ecologische Verbindingszone between the Aa and the Meuse.
