= Dieze Bridge =

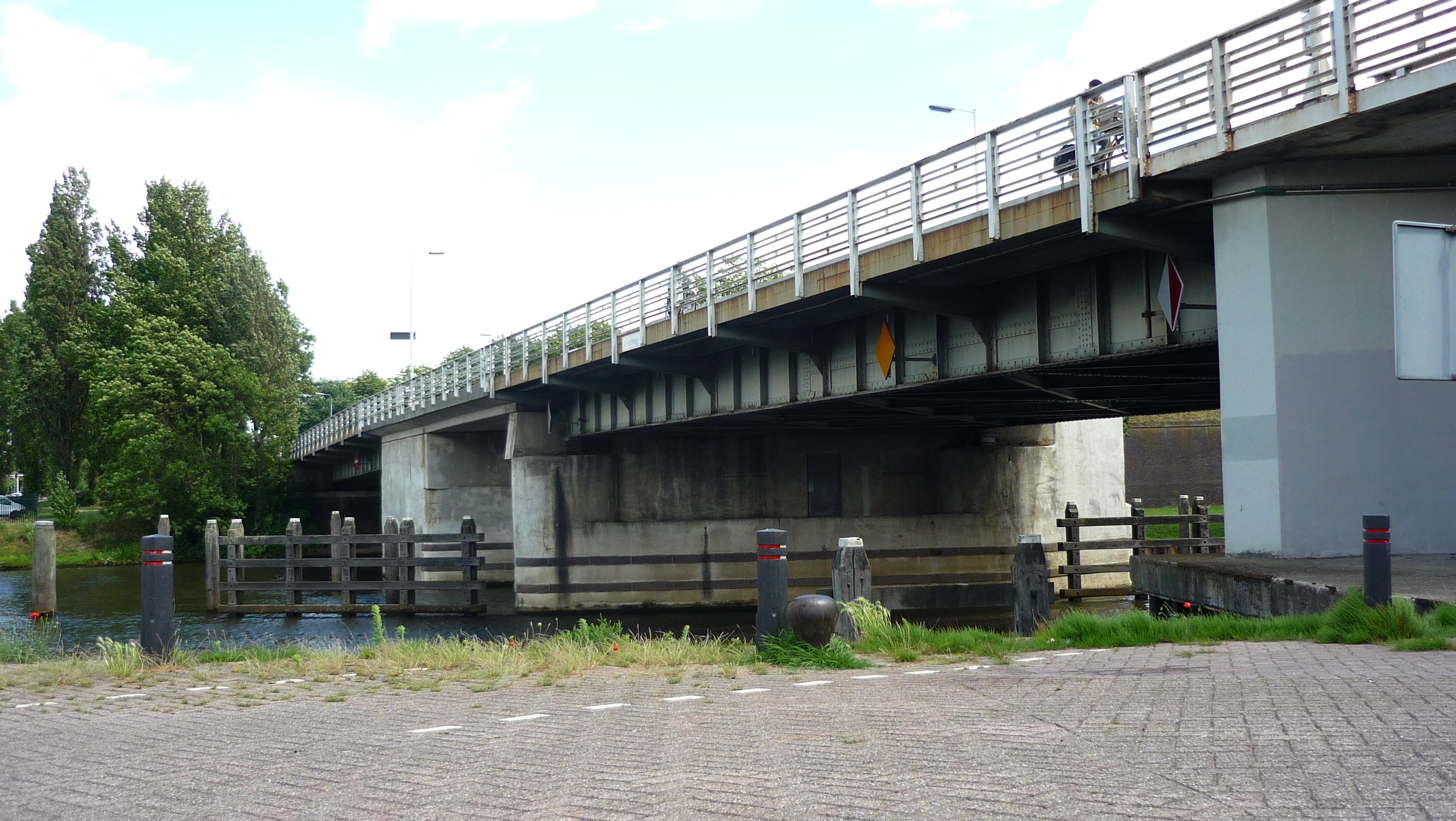
- Dieze Bridge in 's-Hertogenbosch
- Coordinates: 51.695807°N 5.301297°E
- Carries: Road traffic
- Crosses: Dieze, Aa
- Locale: 's-Hertogenbosch, Netherlands

Characteristics
- Design: Bascule bridge, Girder bridge
- Total length: ?
- Width: 18.9 metres (62 ft)
- Longest span: 25 metres (82 ft)
- Clearance below: 6.2 m

The Dieze Bridge is a bridge for road traffic, which spans the rivers Dieze and Aa, just north of 's-Hertogenbosch, Netherlands. The Dieze Railway bridge is somewhat further downstream.

== Location ==
For practical purposes, one can consider the Dieze bridge to be at the confluence of the Dommel, Binnendieze, and Aa. If one wants to be very exact, one can say that the Dommel and Binnendieze meet 50 m south of the bridge, to form the Dieze. Therefore, the bridge is technically at the confluence of the Dieze and Aa. An interesting detail is that this confluence has been moved downstream by connecting a bastion of the Citadel of 's-Hertogenbosch to the central pier of the bridge.

== Context ==
=== By-pass through the west of the city ===
When mass production of cars became general in the 1920s, the Dutch government started to think about adapting the road network for cars. One of the roads that featured in a national plan for motorways was the road from Utrecht to 's-Hertogenbosch. It would be one of the main north–south arteries for Dutch road traffic. It was planned to continue further to the south over Vught, i.e. southwest of the city.

One of the urgent problems faced by motor traffic moving from north to south, was the situation in the medieval center of 's-Hertogenbosch. Here the small roads led to many accidents, and above all, to endless congestion and delays. However, the city center had to be traversed in order to cross the Zuid-Willemsvaart and river Aa (Meuse), just east of the citadel, because there was no road bridge over the Dieze.

The solution was to project the motorway to the west, i.e. through the city quarter 'Het Zand' between the old center and the railway. In 1937 the plan for the so-called traverse became known. It consisted of three major works. The first and major part was the construction of a broad and high bridge over the Dieze, with the required access ramps. The second part, the construction of a major motorway with frontage roads through Het Zand. The third part was the construction of a new broader Willemsbrug over the part of the Dommel west of the city center. Towards the north the new route connect to the old Orthenseweg, which would be connected to the north via Hedel Bridge.

As the motorway concept was something new, the plan mentioned that no bicycles, wagons or other non-motorized traffic would be allowed on the main road. Parking would be forbidden in the narrow Brugstraat (as is still the case today). In all other places on the main lane, stopping would also be forbidden. The cost of the bridge and ramps would be born by the national government. It would also contribute 25% to the cost of the other works, which would be born by the municipality.

=== Requirements ===
The design called for the Dieze Bridge to have a main road surface that was 12 m wide, with sidewalks of 2.5 m wide on each side. A quay would be constructed along the Havendijk, with an access 'tunnel' below the southern ramp. On the southern side the ramp would run from the Brugplein upwards. On the northern side the ramp started near the crossing of the old Orthenstraat with the Citadellaan.

== Construction ==
=== Connecting works finished previously ===
On 29 December 1937 Hedel Bridge was opened. It spanned the Meuse north of the Dieze. On 19 November 1938 the new Willemsbrug to the south of the planned Diezebrug was opened.

=== Contracting ===
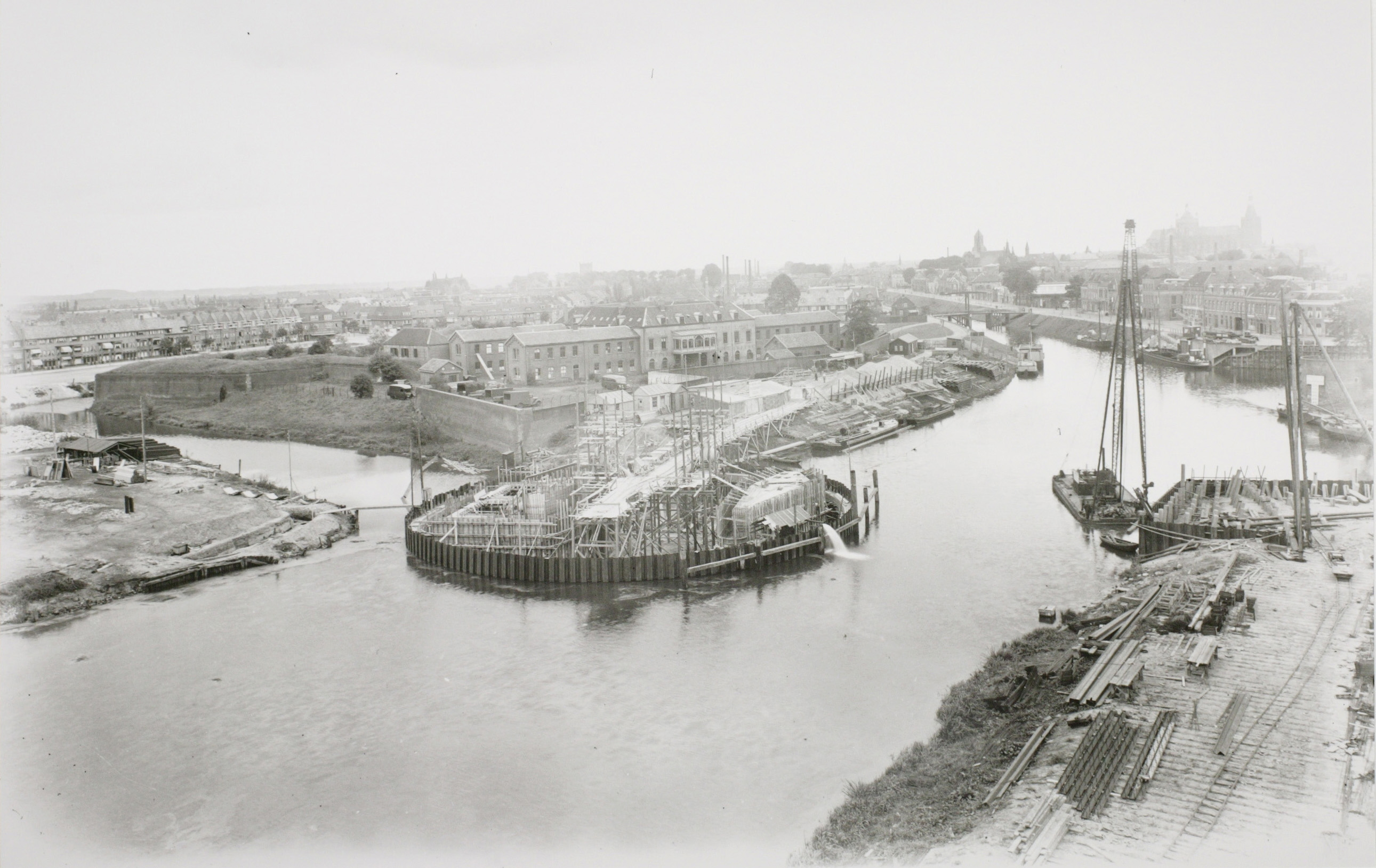
Construction of the central piers on 25 September 1939

Meanwhile, there were small changes in the plans. A new agreement between municipality and national government was made on 16 May 1938. The projected quay along the Havendijk would be replaced by a new quay just west of the bridge. On the northern side, the Vaaltweg would no longer cross the access ramp. Instead, a small tunnel for pedestrians would be made. The small harbor on the Werfpad, also on the northern side, would become even smaller. In compensation, it would be managed by the municipality.

In 1938, 180,000 guilders for the Dieze Bridge and ramps, were brought on the 1939 budget. In December 1938 the plans for the Dieze Bridge arrived at the offices of the 's-Hertogenbosch municipality. An old defensive wall, which was found on the northern side, then led to a minor change in plans. On 7 March 1939 the order was tendered. It was won by H.J. Nederhorst N.V. (later part of Hollandsche Beton Groep) from Gouda, for 209,623 guilders.

=== Construction starts ===
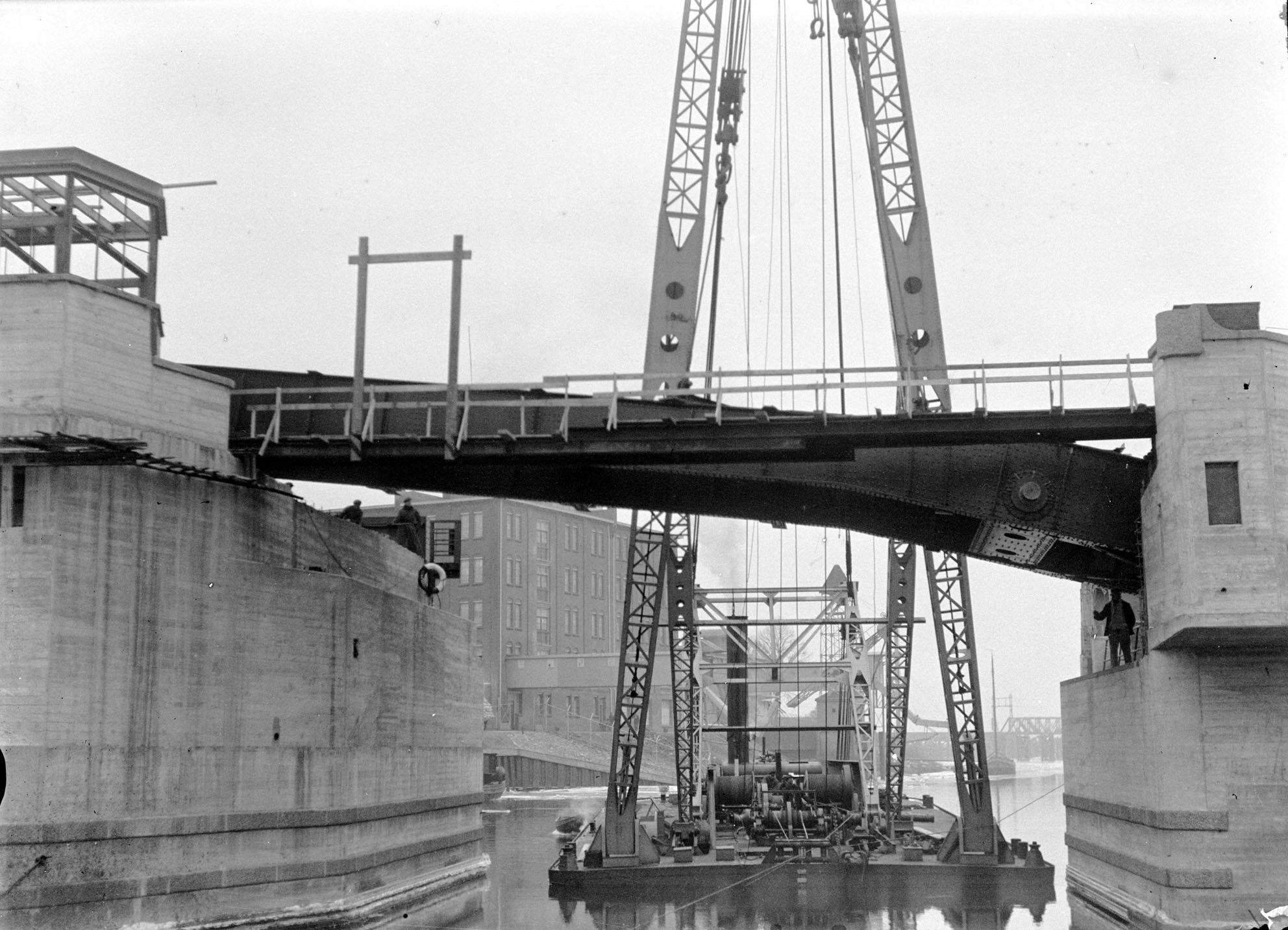
The movable part of the bascule bridge is put in place.

By May 1939 work was in progress. In the center of the rivers, it started with the construction of a 45 m diameter concrete circle with steel walls. Inside were pumps that sucked up water from underground, so work was done with dry feet. 80 concrete piles of 9 m long were driven into the ground to provide the foundation for two central piers. These are the two piers which now stand in the water. From a technical point of view, they might each consist of two separate piers, but to the eye, there is one northern and one southern pier standing in the water. The northern pier would hold the mechanism which moved the bascule. The southern pier held the little house for the operator of the bridge, which has since been removed.

The piles below the land side of the southern access ramp were 12 m long, because solid ground was deeper over there. On average the bridge would be 6 m above water. In September 1939 300,000 guilders were brought on the 1940 budget in order to quickly finish the work. In November 1939 another stretch of an old defensive wall was found. It was 15–20 m long, and 2 m wide.

During World War II, the Netherlands were conquered by Germany in May 1940. During the operations, the Dutch blew up part of the Dieze Bridge. Almost immediately after the fighting, construction was resumed. In September 1940, there was another tender for parts of the access ramps. It was again won by Nederhorst, for 31,785 guilders. In January 1941, a concrete surface was ordered at Van Drunen en Zonen for 17,455 guilders. On 16 January 1942 the Dieze Bridge officially became a public road, so it was probably finished by that time.

In October 1944 resistance fighters tried to take the Dieze Bridge intact. The attempt failed, primarily because the resistance lacked anti-tank weapons. After admitting defeat, the Germans blew up the southern girder bridge, and the part of the northern central pier where the axis of the bascule was held.

For quite some years 's-Hertogenbosch then had to do with a Bailey bridge, which replaced the girder bridge on the southern side. The bascule bridge was repaired. In February 1951 it saw a bizarre accident, where it was claimed to have opened of its own accord, due to an electrical disturbance.

== Characteristics ==
=== Parts of the bridge ===
From north to south, the Dieze bridge consists of five parts. The first part is the northern access ramp. It supports a road that rises to a height of about 6 m on the northern shore of the Aa / Dieze. The second part is a fixed girder bridge which spans the Aa and leads to the northern central pier. The central pier is a massive structure connected to the citadel. It held the mechanism for a bascule bridge which connected to the next pier to the south. These two piers which stand in the water, and their connection form the third part. South of this is the girder bridge which connects to the southern shore. The fifth part is the southern access ramp.

=== Is now a fixed bridge ===
The bascule bridge has been fixed in place, so the bridge can no longer be opened. The reasons why the Dieze Bridge initially became a movable bridge are not that clear. By 1939 most inland shipping had been motorized. Old photographs point to two possible explanations other than facilitating sailing ships. The most likely seems to provide for the (funnel) height of inland steamboats sailing the Zuid-Willemsvaart.

The inside of the piers which housed the bascule when the bridge was open, is quite large. Each of the two piers has a room of 5 by 9 m and 9 m high. The fact that by 1957 100 m of old archives of the North-Brabant division of Rijkswaterstaat were present inside these piers, seems to indicate that by then, the bascule had already been removed.

== The Future ==
=== Motor ways diverted around 's-Hertogenbosch ===
After World War II road traffic increased again, and the Dieze Bridge route became severely congested. In December 1970 the Meuse Bridge at Empel was opened. The A2 motorway was then re-routed to the east of 's-Hertogenbosch. However, because of the measure by which road traffic had increased, this did not put an end to congestion on the Dieze Bridge route. The Randweg is a by-pass from the A2 motorway, south of the city, to the A59 motorway, west of the city. It was opened in 2011 and finally put an end to the almost permanent traffic congestion on the southern tip of Dieze Bridge route.

=== Plans ===
The diversion of the motorways sharply increased the quality of living in the city quarter Het Zand. From 2013 to 2015, the new Royal Welsh Bridge was then constructed over the Dieze, just west of the Dieze Railroad Bridge. It created a new local route for cars, which makes that the Dieze Bridge is no longer needed for traffic inside the city.

The municipality of 's-Hertogenbosch then came up with the plan: 's-Hertogenbosch City Delta. This plan had three themes: Places to meet, Space for cyclists and pedestrians, and construction of some very high-rising apartment buildings. In all probability the bridge will be demolished. The official point of view is that it blocks the view towards the citadel.
