= Hedel =

- Town
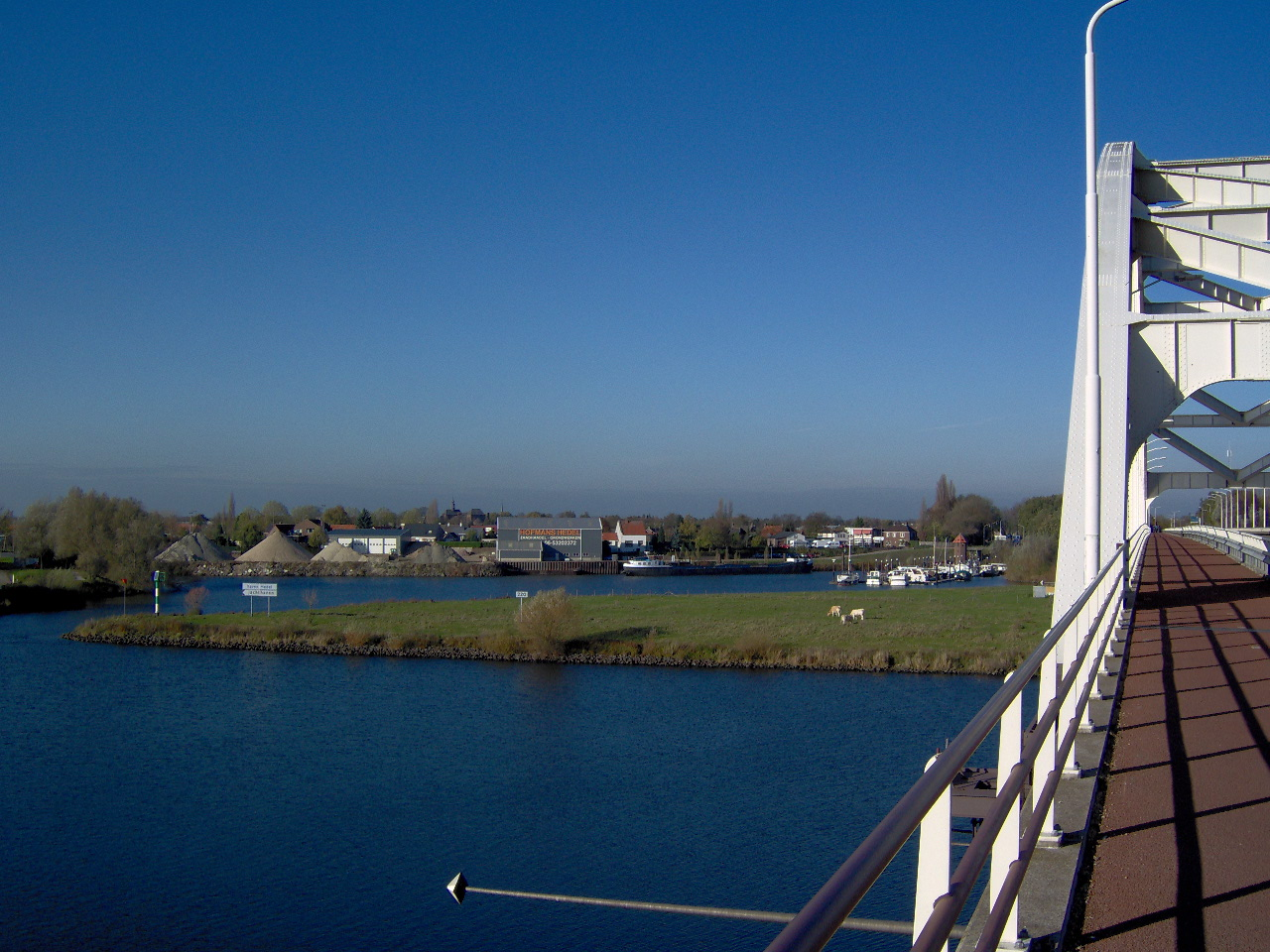
- View from Hedel Bridge

- Flag Coat of arms

- Location in the province of Gelderland in the Netherlands Hedel (Netherlands)
- Coordinates: 51°44′48″N 5°15′33″E
- Country: Netherlands
- Province: Gelderland
- Municipality: Maasdriel

Area
  - Total: 13.15 km^{2} (5.08 sq mi)
- Elevation: 3.3 m (11 ft)

Population (2021)
  - Total: 5,095
  - Density: 387.5/km^{2} (1,003/sq mi)
- Time zone: UTC+1 (CET)
  - Summer (DST): UTC+2 (CEST)
- Postal code: 5321
- Dialing code: 073
- Major roads: A2, N831, Oude Rijksweg

Hedel (Dutch pronunciation: [ˈɦeːdəl]) is a town in the Dutch province of Gelderland. It is a part of the municipality of Maasdriel, and lies about 7 km northwest of 's-Hertogenbosch.

Hedel was a separate municipality until 1999, when it was merged with Maasdriel.

In World War II, there were a lot of fights in Hedel, especially during the month April 1945 when the armies of the Princess Irene Brigade came to liberate the town. Hedel has a very strategic location, it lies on the border of Gelderland and North Brabant and on the Maas. Almost the whole town of Hedel was destroyed during World War II.

A monument to 12 members of the Princess Irene Brigade killed between April 23rd and April 26th, 1945 was erected in Hedel.

Hedel has its own harbour named 't Stik. There is also an excavation of the castle of Hedel. The excavations lie in the Historic Museum in Hedel. A clock Museum and a mini-zoo with snowy owls, goats, pheasants, parrots, chickens, ducks and other animals can also be found in Hedel.

Hedel has got both a Reformed and a Catholic church. The reformed church was built in 1640, but it was destroyed during World War II and rebuilt in the original style several years later.

On the first Monday of November after 1 November, there is a horse market. This is the biggest horse market in the Netherlands and one of the biggest horse markets in Europe.

== Gallery ==
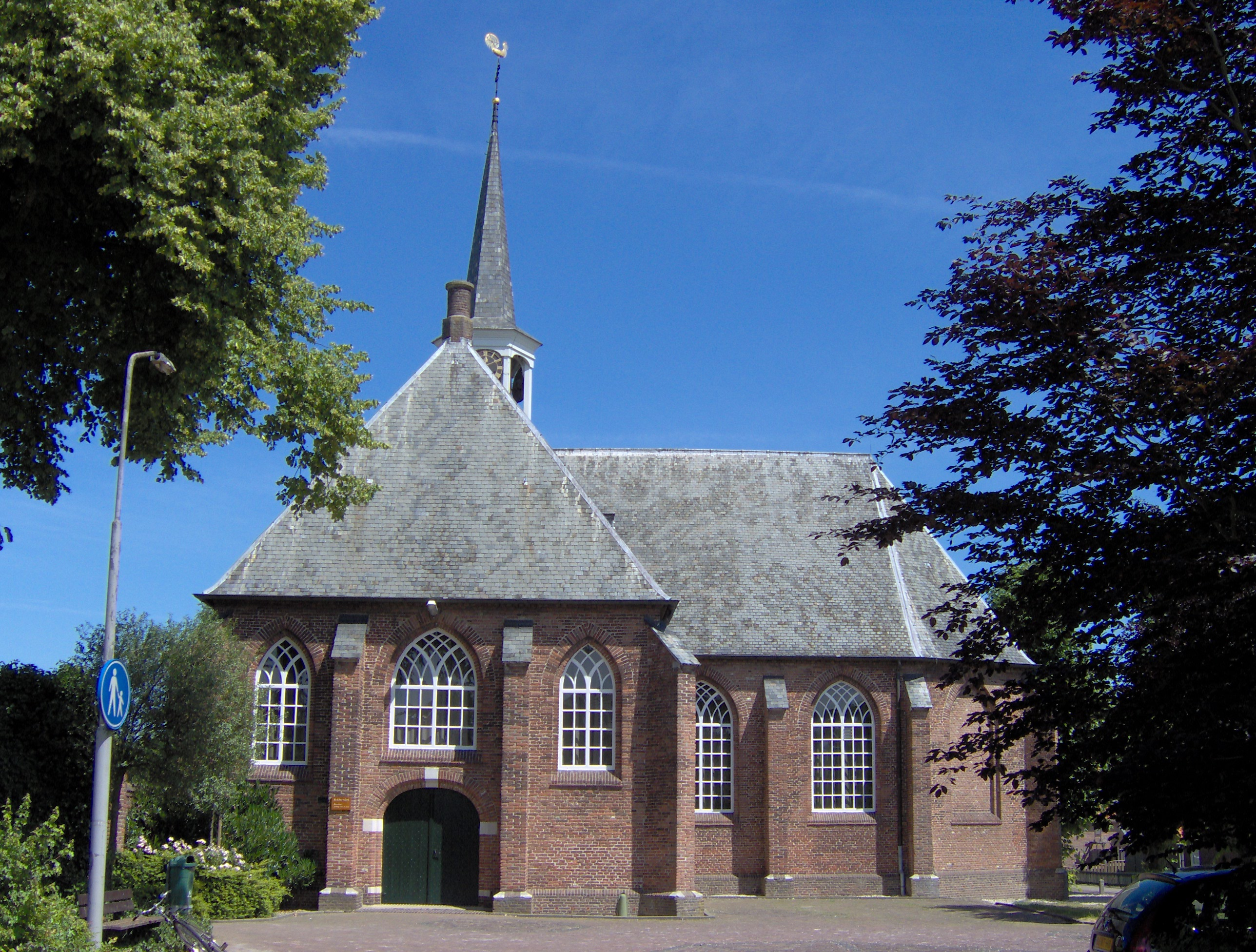
Dutch Reformed church

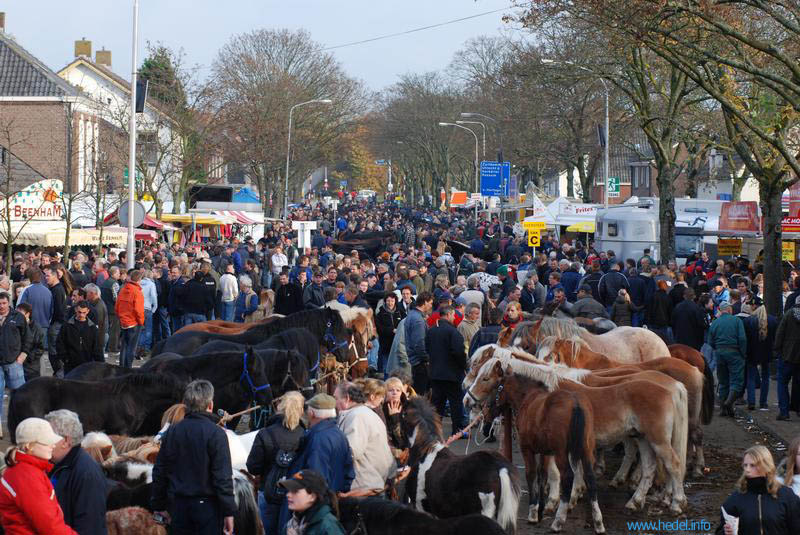
Horse market

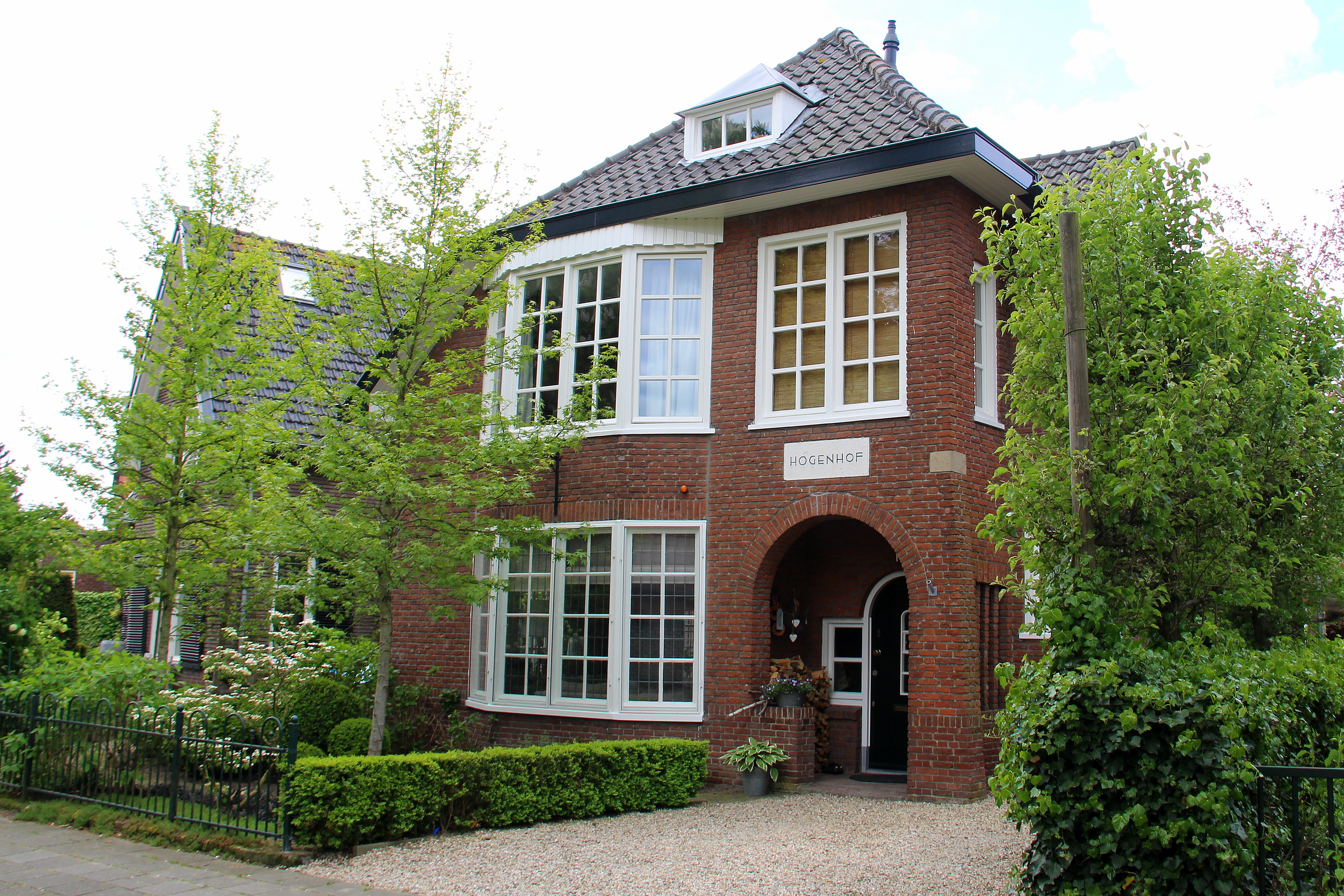
Villa in Hedel

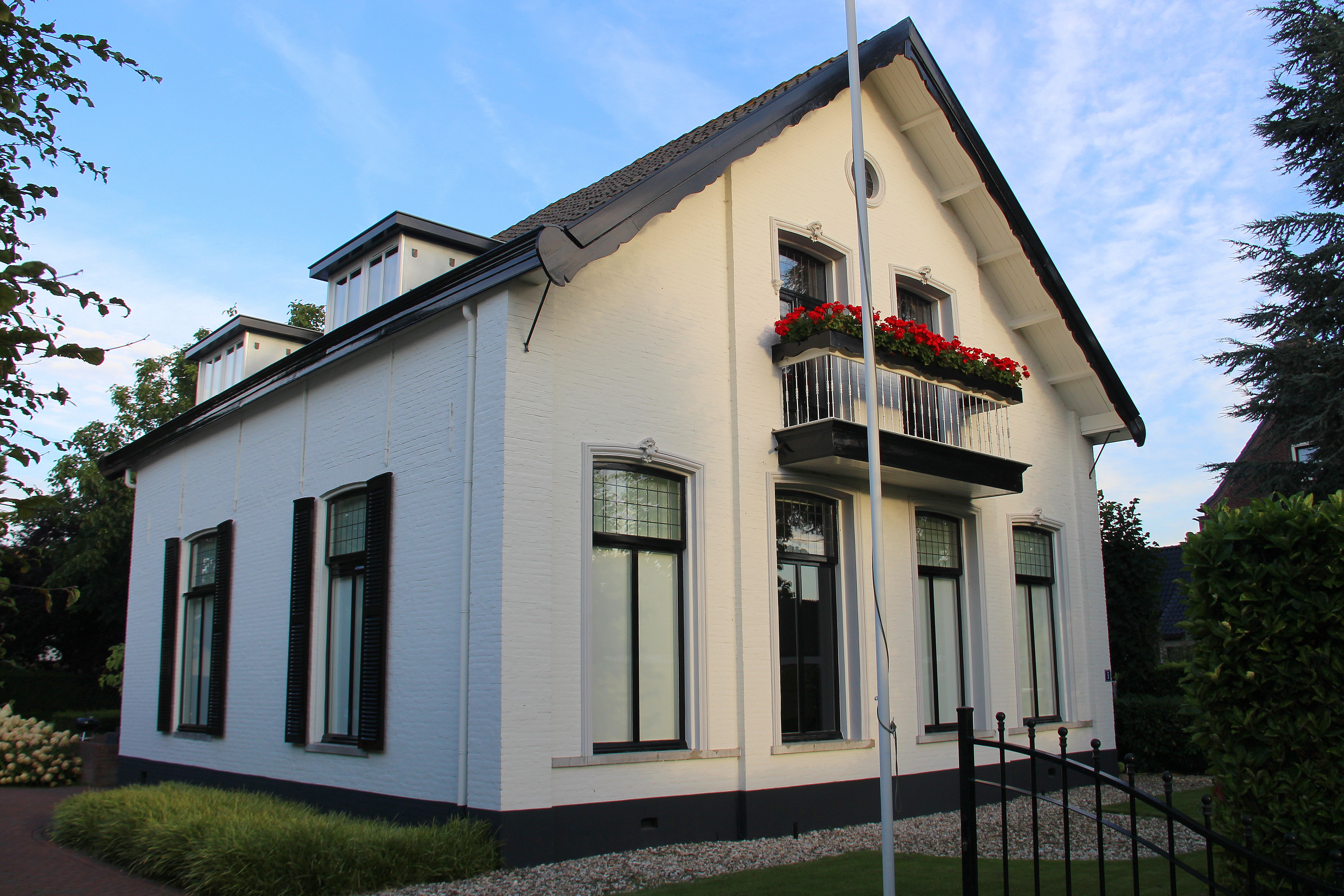
House in Hedel
