= Hedel Bridge =

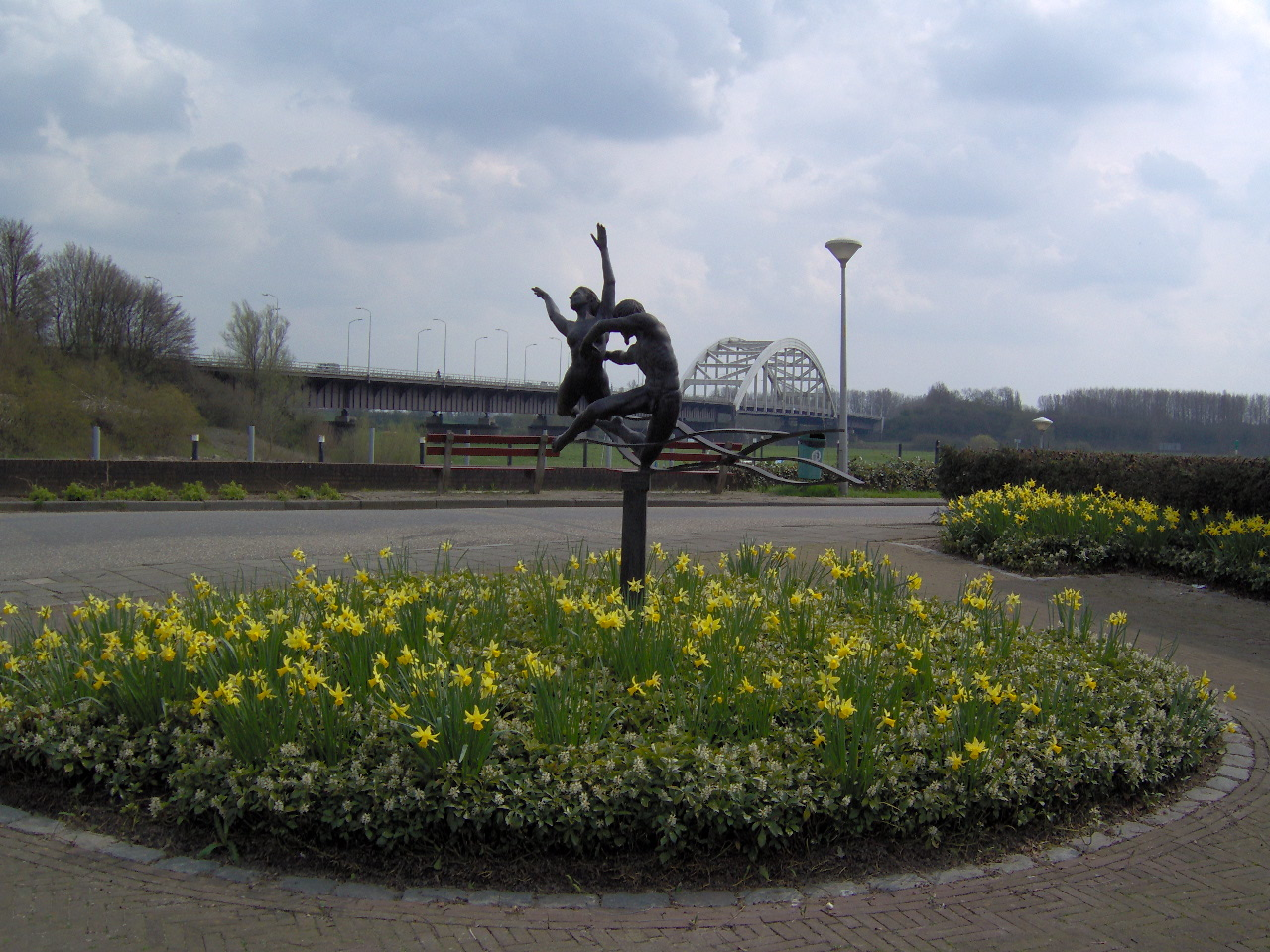
- View of Hedel Bridge from Hedel
- Coordinates: 51.739677°N 5.268573°E
- Carries: Road traffic
- Crosses: Meuse
- Locale: Hedel, Netherlands

Characteristics
- Design: Tied-arch bridge, Girder bridge
- Longest span: 115 metres (377 ft)
- Clearance below: 12.00 m

History
- Construction end: 1937

Location
- Interactive map of Hedel Bridge

Hedel Bridge is a tied-arch bridge over the Meuse dating from 1937 near Hedel, Gelderland. The bridge was built for the Oude Rijksweg, a former part of the A2 motorway that connected 's-Hertogenbosch to Utrecht.

== Characteristics ==
Hedel Bridge crosses the Meuse. In the center, it is a 115 m long and 12.00 m high tied-arch bridge. North and south of this are smaller girder bridge sections. These are not meant for passing ships, but for giving way to the Meuse water when the river rises. In 1940-1941 and 1946-1947 the bridge was repaired according to the original plans.

The bridge deck was originally made for a four-lane motorway. It is therefore much wider than required for the current use of the bridge, which is as a two-lane regional road. Therefore, the bridge now has a relatively wide bike path on both sides, separated from the other traffic by very solid traffic barriers.

== History of the previous pontoon bridge ==
=== The ferry and plans for a pontoon bridge ===
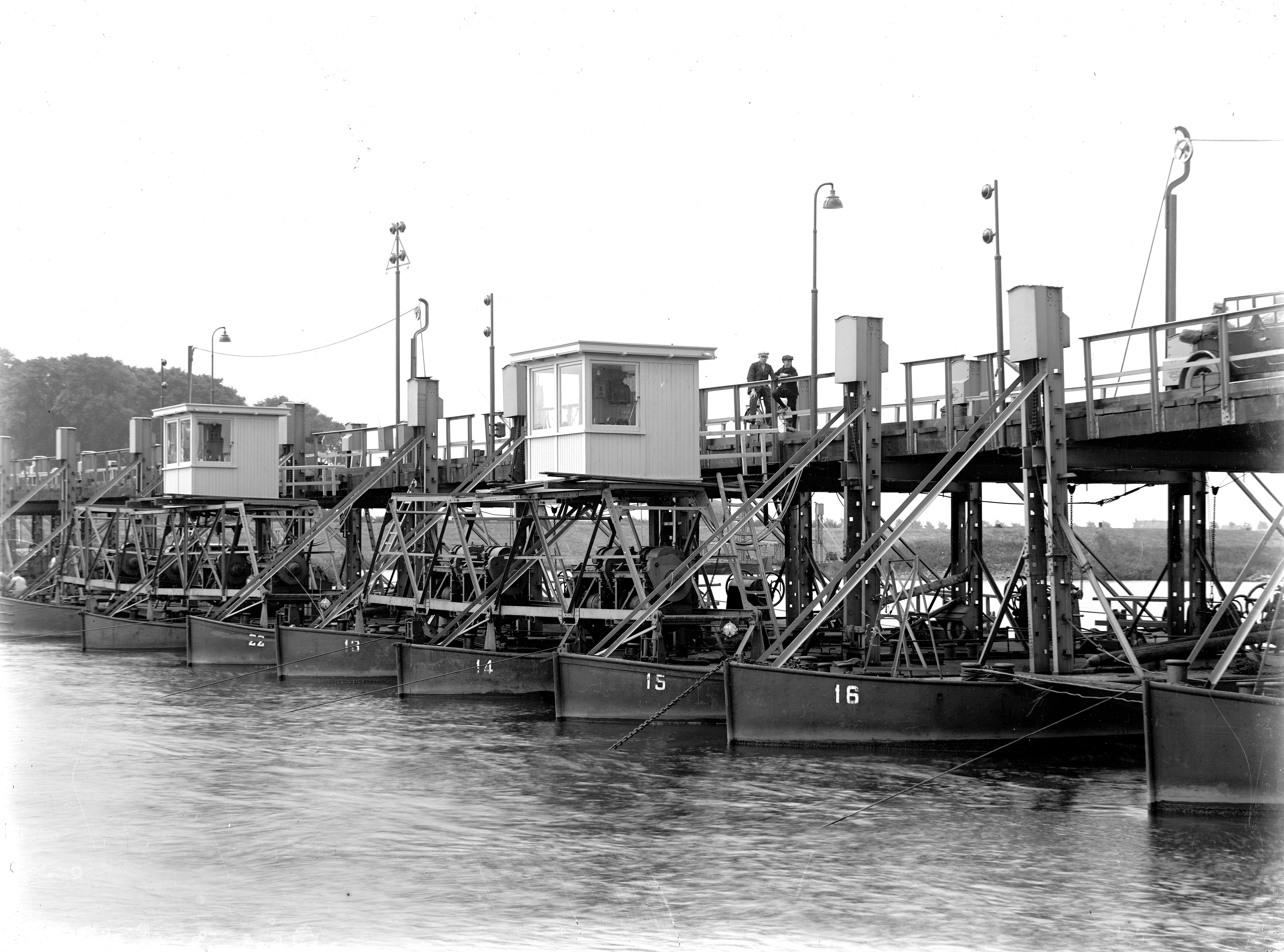
With winch operation

Operation of the pontoon bridge and new Hedel Bridge

In the mid-nineteenth century, the national road between Utrecht and 's-Hertogenbosch had three ferries. One over the Lek at Culemborg, one over the Waal near Zaltbommel, and the ferry over the Meuse at Hedel. These three were maintained by the government.

In 1851 a plan to replace the ferry with a pontoon bridge came up. In the following years, the municipality of -s-Hertogenbosch and others began to press for construction. In 1857 the 's-Hertogenbosch decided to offer up to 7000 guilders if the government would construct it. Later the province followed by offering 4,666 guilders. In October 1859 the government decided to build the pontoon bridge. Near Hedel the Meuse would be tightened to 150 m. This would make the span of the bridge much shorter, but would also make it easier to keep the Meuse up to depth before Fort Crèvecoeur, where Crèvecoeur Lock was under construction to make the Dieze more navigable.

=== The pontoon bridge ===
In order to shorten the bridge, the Meuse was tightened at Hedel. Two wooden bridgeheads stuck into the Meuse. Here the pontoon bridge would be connected thus that it could rise and fall with the level of the water. There would be 20 pontoons for the bridge. Some of them probably serving as reserve. A new ferry harbor was constructed to store the boats. The pontoons were built by the shipyard of P. and C. Boele. The pontoon bridge was opened for the public on 23 September 1861. For passage, a horse drawn cart paid 15 cents, a wagon paid 30 cents.

The pontoon bridge had a history of its own. In almost every winter it had to be stored in the harbor due to floating ice. This happened for the first time in January 1862. At such times a boat replaced the pontoon bridge. A high level of the Meuse could also lead to storing the pontoon bridge. There were also almost regular accidents. In November 1861 one of the pontoons was damaged by a steam powered vessel of the Rotterdam-Venlo shipping line. In June 1862 some of the pontoons of the bridge sank due to strong currents. In 1875 the pontoon bridge was caught by the floating ice, with parts ending up in Bokhoven and Ammerzoden.

In 1870 Hedel Railway Bridge was built for the Utrecht–Boxtel railway. It was close to the pontoon bridge, which was moved a bit and underwent some changes. By 7 July the pontoon bridge had been dismantled to be moved. On 19 July 1870 the Franco-Prussian War erupted. It led to frantic attempts to get the new railway bridge in working order, and to sending army pontoon bridges to the area.

In about 1890 the pontoon bridge was renewed. In 1888, 1889, 1890, 1891 and 1892 three new pontoons were ordered. This brings the total number of new pontoons to 18. Most of these were built by the shipyard RIJSM in Kampen. In 1899 the pontoon bridge was reclassified from ferry to bridge. This meant that it would become toll free in 1900.

In 1904 the Bergse Maas was opened, and the level of the Meuse near Hedel dropped significantly. As a consequence, the pontoon bridge could no longer reach the bridgeheads at all times. Therefore, Rijkswaterstaat made two new 3 m lower bridgeheads 18 m below stream. These became the normal place of the pontoon bridge. The old bridgeheads would be used if the level of the Meuse became very high. After the new river settled, permanent new bridgeheads were made. The double access ramps are visible on the photo of the construction of Hedel Bridge. In 1906 four iron pontoons were ordered. In the following decades the remaining wooden pontoons were gradually replaced by iron ones. In 1931 the wooden pontoons No. 10 and 11 were sold.

In 1928 the pontoon bridge got two electric engines which drove winches. This drastically reduced the time it took to open the bridge for shipping. After Hedel Bridge was opened, the parts of the pontoon bridge were auctioned in November 1938.

== History of Hedel Bridge ==
=== The national motorway plan ===
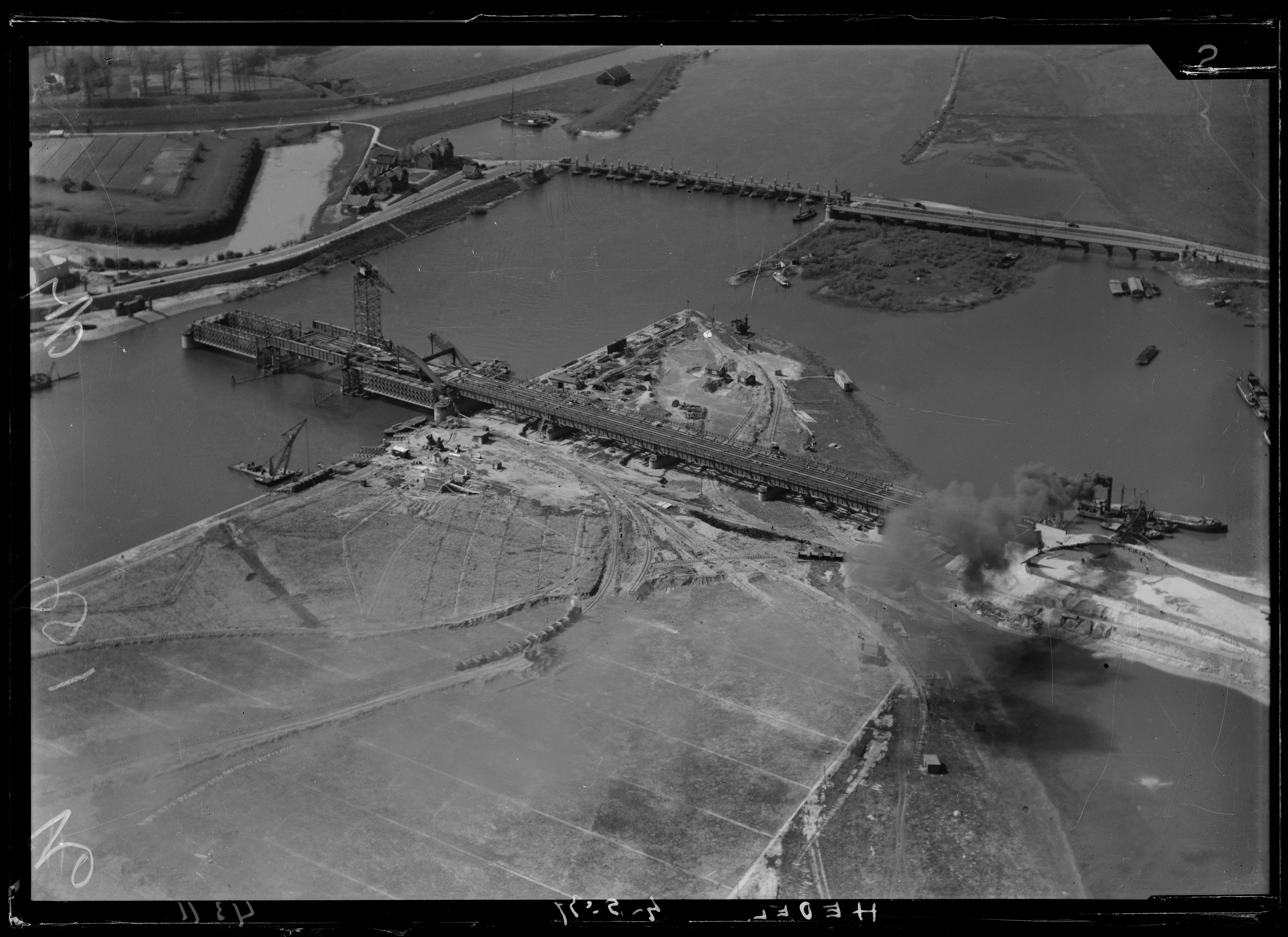
Construction of Hedel Bridge with the pontoon bridge in the background

In the 1920s the Dutch government started to think about adapting the road network for cars. One of the roads that featured in the 1927 Rijkswegenplan was a motorway from Utrecht to 's-Hertogenbosch. It would be one of the main north–south arteries for Dutch road traffic. The three pontoon bridges at Hedel, Vianen and Zaltbommel did not fit in this plan, because the weather often prevented their use. Therefore, the national motorway plan called for a high solid bridge over the Meuse.

The new bridge would of course lead to a strong increase in traffic on the road from 's-Hertogenbosch to the north. The government foresaw that this would lead to congestion problems in the medieval center of 's-Hertogenbosch. Therefore, a plan was made to move the road to the south so it would pass the city to the west, continuing further to the south over Vught. This would lead to construction of Dieze Bridge over the Dieze in 1939.

=== Construction ===
By June 1933 Hedel bridge had been designed. Construction of Hedel Bridge started on 26 February 1936. It was expected to be finished in 1938. On 29 December 1937 Hedel Bridge was opened for traffic.

=== Characteristics (1937) ===
The bridge that opened in 1937 was 400 m long. Its main span was 120 m. North of this 5 openings each spanned 40 m. South of the main span were 2 openings of 40 m each. Two piers were made to withstand the river's current. There were five smaller piers, and two bridgeheads. The under side of the main span was at 11.40 m above Amsterdam Ordnance Datum. The superstructure of the bridge was like that of the Vianen Lek Bridge.

The bridge deck was 11 m wide, with 2 traffic lanes in each direction. At each side of the deck there was a 2.50 m wide heightened path for cyclists and pedestrians.

=== World War II ===
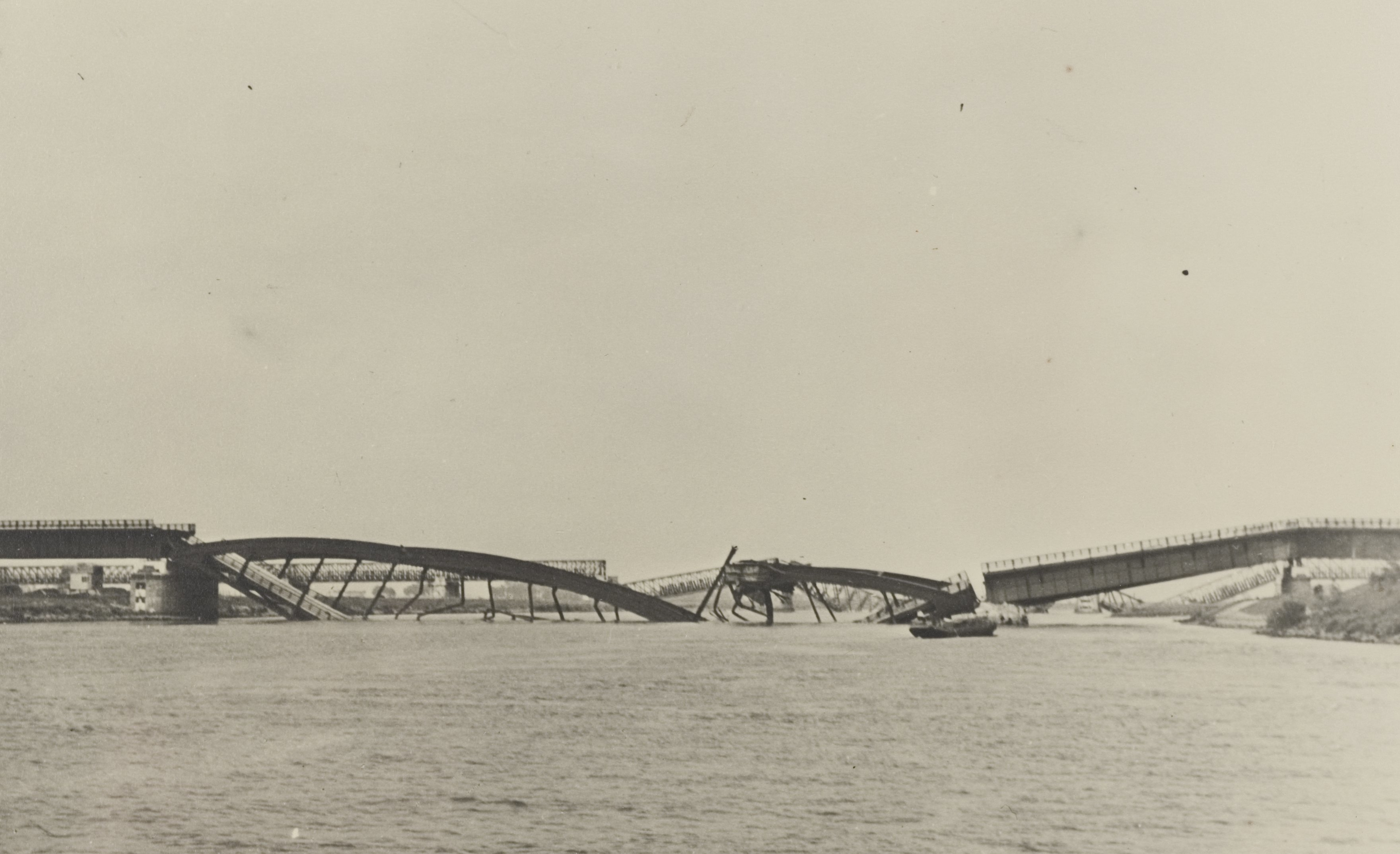
Hedel Bridge after May 1940

During the May 1940 German invasion of the Netherlands, the Dutch army destroyed Hedel Bridge and the Hedel Railway Bridge. This was done by blowing up one of the piers and one of the spans of each. For Hedel Bridge this was the pier on the Brabant side. After only a few days, a ferry service was set up at Hedel.

In June 1940 a contract to remove the demolished spans of Hedel bridge was awarded to Nederlandse Dok Maatschappij (NDM). Meanwhile, a new pontoon bridge for light traffic had been made in mid-June 1940. In August 1941 reconstruction of the Brabant pier of the bridge was awarded to Amsterdamse Aannemings Maatschappij for 66,000 guilders.

It's not clear how much of the bridge was repaired in 1944. That year it was again destroyed. This time by aerial bombardment. In April 1945 the Royal Netherlands Motorized Infantry Brigade a.k.a. Prinses Irene Brigade established a bridgehead on the other side of the Meuse at Hedel during operation Orange. After serious fighting this was abandoned when it had no more use.

=== Post World War II ===
With Bailey bridge

In July 1945 a new pontoon bridge was laid across the Meuse near Hedel. Like the old pontoon bridge, this was not immune to the weather. In February 1946 it could not be used because of the high level of the Meuse. In December 1946 it was into storage because of floating ice. This was repeated in the first three months of 1947. Meanwhile, the pontoon bridge often led to severe delays when it had to be opened for shipping.

In October 1947 Hedel Bridge was expected to be ready for possible reopening before the end of the year. If the pontoon bridge was hindered by the weather, Hedel Bridge would serve with a wooden emergency deck. In January 1948 a 260 m long Bailey bridge was laid inside the bridge that was under construction. That same month, it was opened for alternating one way traffic. One meter below the bailey bridge, construction of the permanent deck of Hedel Bridge continued. In July 1948 the bailey bridge was removed, and Hedel Bridge was finished.

From 1956 to 1970 Hedel Bridge was part of the A2 motorway that connected 's-Hertogenbosch to Utrecht. In 1970 the A2 was rerouted to the east of 's-Hertogenbosch. Hedel Bridge became a bridge only for local traffic. Like the rest of the A2 that was degraded, it was reduced from 4 lanes to a single traffic lane in each direction.

=== Pontoon Bridge of Crèvecoeur ===
Fort Crèvecoeur on the south bank of Hedel Bridge is a depot and exercise terrain of the engineers of the Dutch army. During the Cold War a pontoon bridge was kept ready at Crèvecoeur in case Hedel Bridge would be destroyed. In 2012 the engineers wanted to lay a pontoon bridge to Hedel as an exercise, but did not get permission from Rijkswaterstaat.
