= Citadel of 's-Hertogenbosch =

Fortress in the Netherlands

Citadel of 's Hertogenbosch
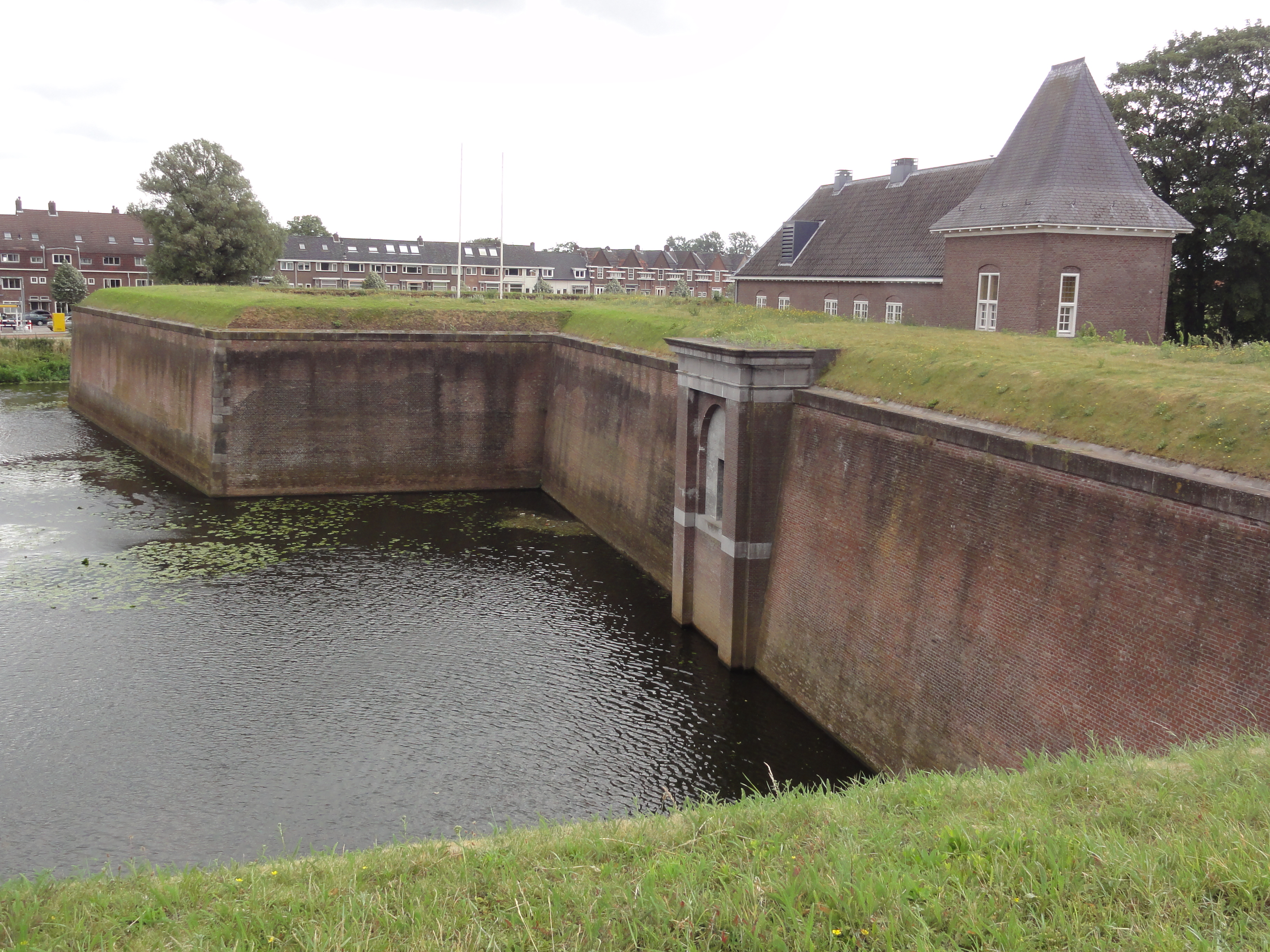
- North west side of the citadel
- Location: Citadellaan, 's-Hertogenbosch
- Coordinates: 51°41′43″N 5°18′12″E
- Designer: Pieter Bilderbeeck (probable)

The Citadel of 's-Hertogenbosch is a fortress on the north side of the town center of 's-Hertogenbosch in the Netherlands. It was constructed from 1637 to 1642.

== Construction ==
=== Previous structures ===
In the 14th and 15th centuries the southern part of the current location of the citadel was part of the city proper. It contained the Orthen Gate, which had been constructed between 1315 and 1350. Later Bastion Orthenpoort was constructed to protect this part of the city. In 1541 a first attempt to construct it had been made with the assistance of the Italian architect and engineer Alessandro Pasqualini. In 1617-1618 the Bastion was finally constructed when the threat of the Dutch Republic became ever more real.

=== Construction of the citadel ===
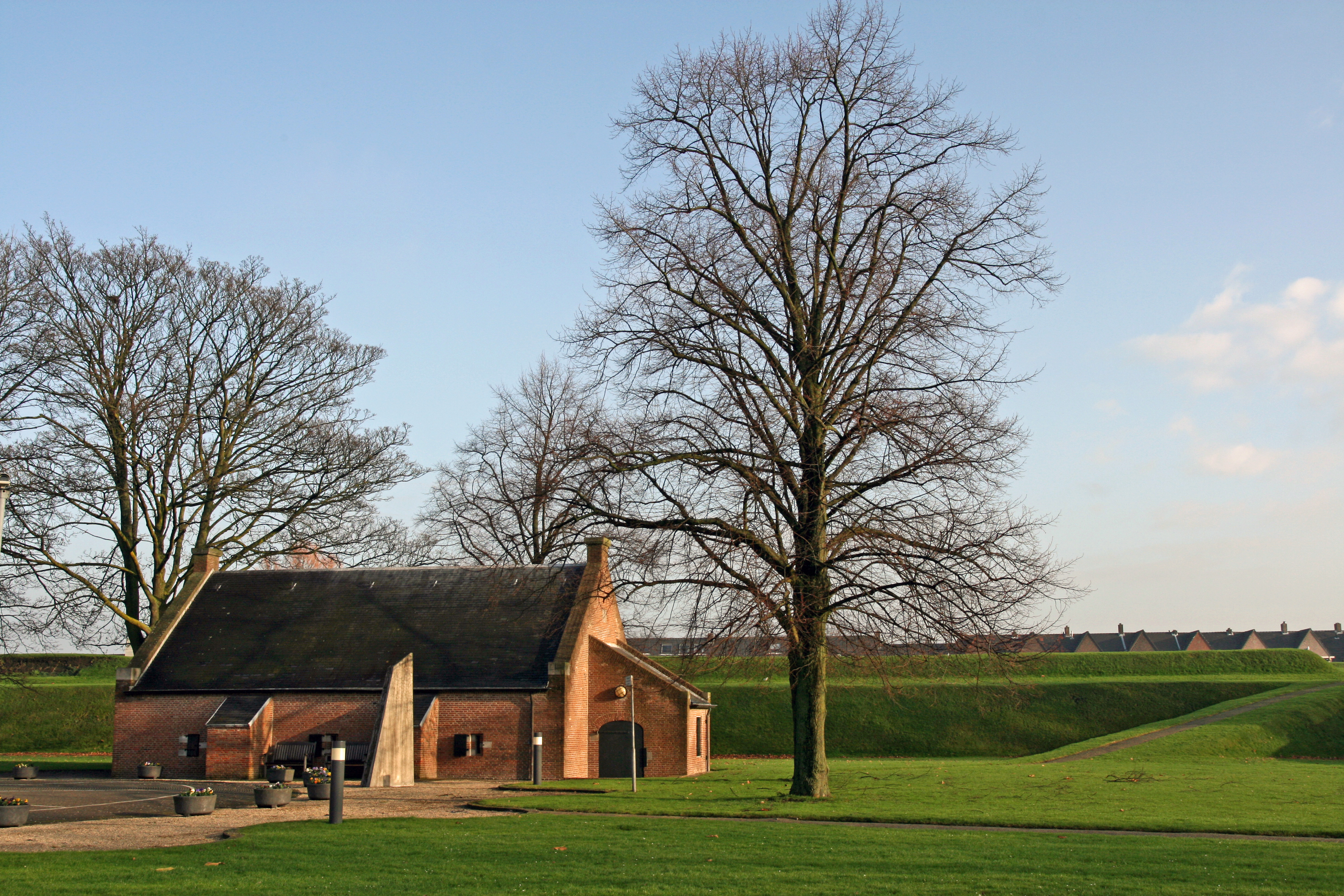
The citadel's gunpowder magazine dates from 1750

In 1629 the Dutch Republic conquered 's-Hertogenbosch after a famous siege. It spelled the end for Bastion Orthenpoort, and the Orthen Gate was demolished in 1635. In 1637 construction of the citadel started. The design was probably by Pieter Bilderbeeck, inspector of national fortifications. He chose a regular pentagonal form with bastions with brick walls. This was a kind of ideal type of fortification, cf the Citadel of Lille. It got the name Fortress Willem Maria, after two children of Frederick Henry, Prince of Orange, conqueror of the city.

The fortress had two functions: It strengthened the city defenses, and it kept the city under control. Because of the latter it received the nickname papenbril. The Dutch word 'papen' referred to the suspected popery of the Catholic inhabitants. The citadel kept the inhabitants in line because it interrupted the city walls. I.e. the inhabitants could revolt, but then they would not be able to defend the city. The fort was probably completed in 1642, when the future Stadholder Willem II visited.

=== Construction of the Esplanade ===
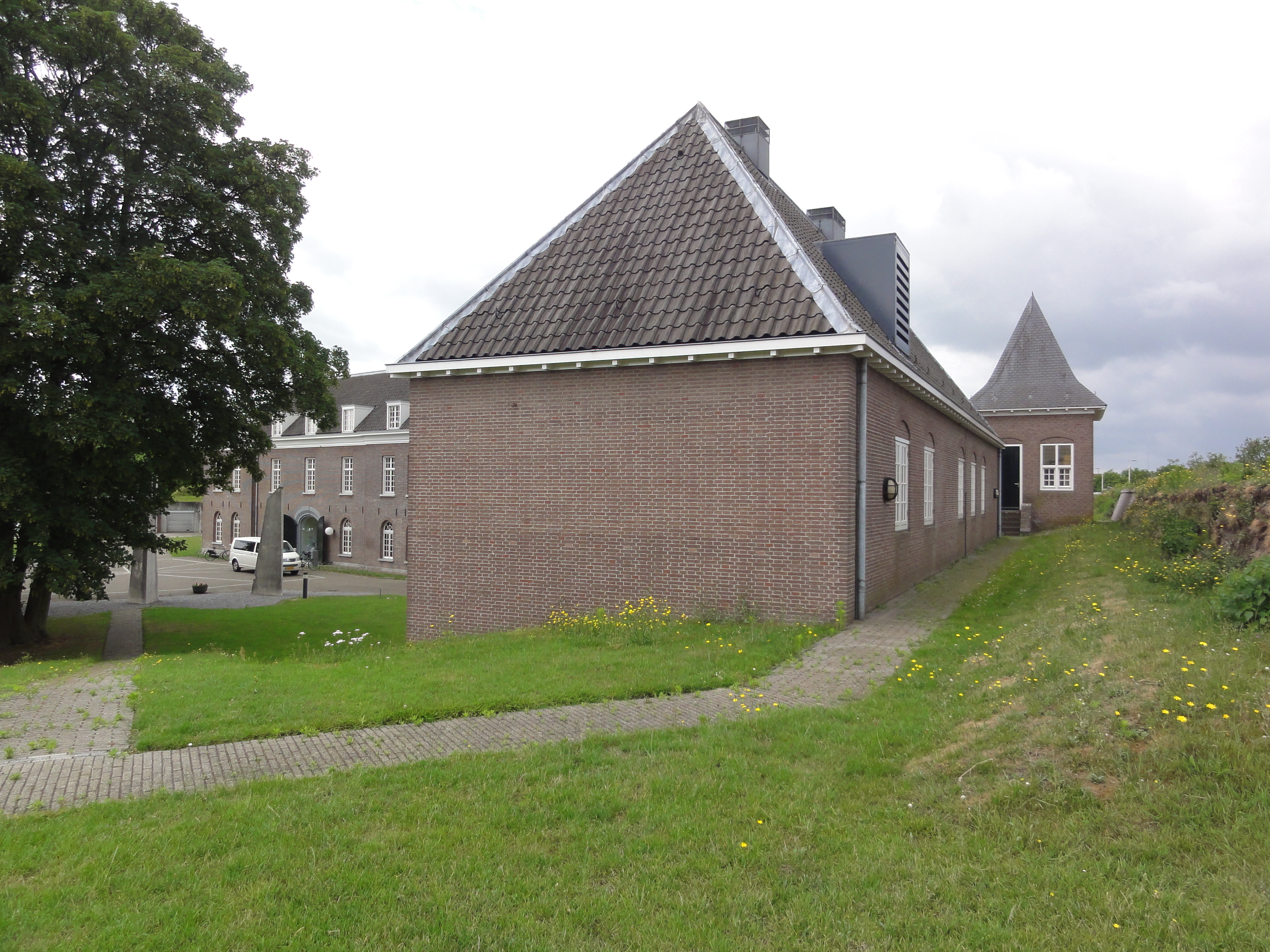
'Guardhouse' or arsenal of the citadel

In order to be able to defend the city-side of the citadel, in case that the city fell, an open area was required. Without it, an attacker which had conquered the city, could simply move its siege guns into buildings near the citadel, and destroy its walls at close range. Therefore 40 houses of the Ortheneind quarter were demolished together with the St Peter and Paul Church., totaling about 4 hectares of the city. The open space that was created would become known as De Plein (the esplanade). Ideas that the Republic simply demolished part of the town so it could fire on potential rebels are popular, but are not supported by facts. In fact, the demolition of the buildings on the Esplanade would only be completed in 1646, because the new masters of the city negotiated with the owners of the buildings which they wanted to remove.

=== Rivers Dommel, Aa and Dieze ===
The confluence of the rivers Dommel and Aa formed the western boundary of the terrain where the citadel was built. From their confluence they flowed north to the Meuse as the river Dieze. At the time the Aa river flowed along the north western city walls, like it does now. On the advice of Hendrik Nobel the Aa was widened in 1639. In order to prevent the city from overflowing in case of inundations, there were two dams in the moat of the citadel. The first was near the confluence with the Dieze. The other was where the north west city wall had been. Close by a new Orthen Gate was constructed.

== Citadel of 's Hertogenbosch ==
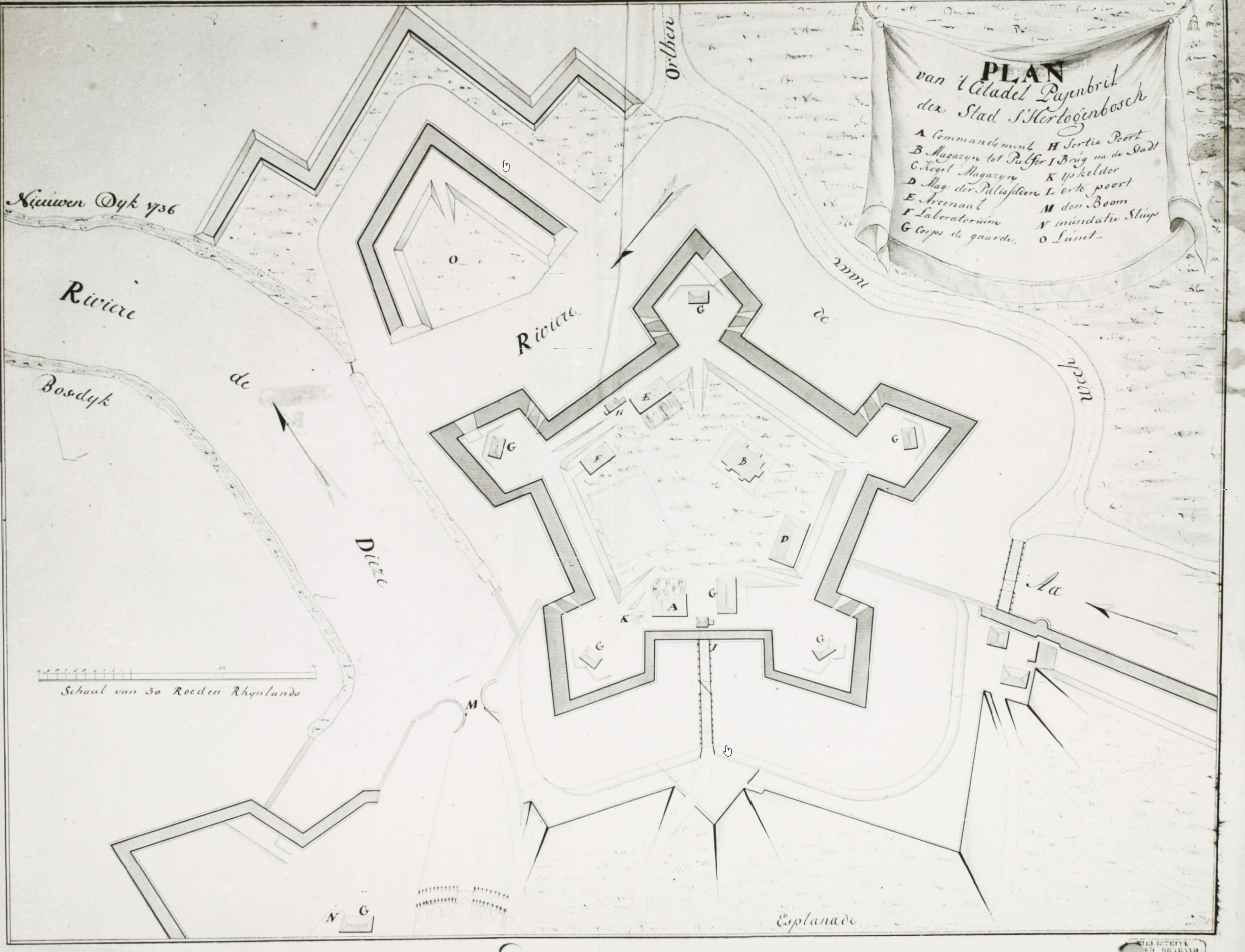
Situation in the late 1780s (Probable date)

Up till the end of the eighteenth century there was no permanent habitation of the citadel. In 1789 a military prison was built in the citadel. This building also housed the military court. There is a map which shows the gunpowder magazine from about 1750, as well as an outline of the military prison. It can therefore be dated between 1750 and 1789, and probably to the late 1780s.

At the time the citadel had a house for the commander, the gunpowder magazine, a magazine for cannonballs, a magazine for stakes to use for the palisades, and a laboratory to make grenades and other gunpowder products. There was also a cellar for ice in the later demolished bastion I. Of particular interest is that the map also shows the building near the north west gate, and calls it the 'Arsenal', just like Hattinga did in 1749. In 1785 the inspecting Lt-General van der Drissen mentioned a 'Verbuswinkel', probably a corruption of 'Bushuis', which also means arsenal.

=== The citadel during the 1794 siege ===
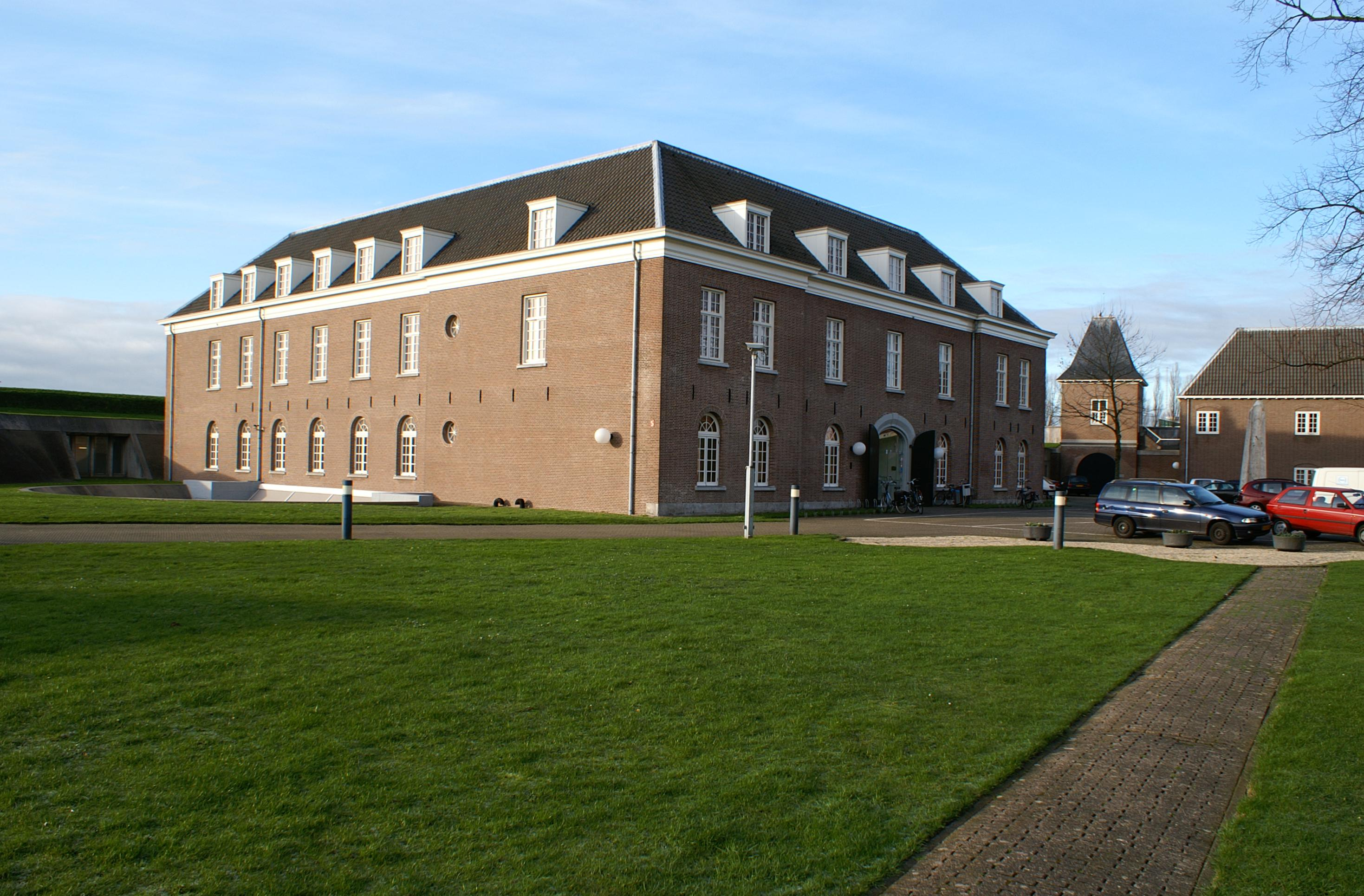
Main building of 1789

During the first of the coalition wars against the French Republic, the territory of present day Belgium was lost in the Flanders campaign of 1794. The French armies then moved north against the Dutch Republic. On 22 September 1794 the French army took the unoccupied Fort Orthen, about 1 kilometre from the citadel. On the 23rd the French howitzers started to bombard the citadel and town from Orthen. The besieging French artillery did quite some damage in the town, but generally the town's artillery had the upper hand. On 27 September 1794 Fort Crèvecoeur on the Meuse was taken by the French. It allowed them to somewhat lower the inundations around the town, and gave them many guns to press the siege. The French attack towards the citadel and the adjoining harbor would get closest of all the approaches. Later it was claimed that a breach had already started in the wall of the citadel when the town surrendered.

On 9 October the governor agreed to hand over the city by treaty. Perhaps the town could have held out longer. However, it's probable that the early surrender enabled most French emigré soldiers to march out in uniform together with the garrison on 12 October. Those who tried to escape in civilian clothes were mostly captured, some of them betrayed by citizens. They were imprisoned in the citadel and mostly hanged on the grounds.

=== The citadel during the 1813-1814 liberation ===
In November 1813 Prince William landed at The Hague. Within a month he ruled the Sovereign Principality of the United Netherlands. However, many fortresses remained under French control. 's-Hertogenbosch was one of these. Commander Colonel Moulé de la Raitrie had been in 's-Hertogenbosch for four years, and was quite aware of how it could be defended. On 12 December 1813 the garrison was reinforced by the retreating troops of general Molitor. On 15 December the Prussian commander Adolf Friedrich von Oppen crossed the Meuse. On the 18th Molitor left 's Hertogenbosch for Grave, but 500 soldiers were left behind to garrison the citadel, even though there were few supplies. On 19 December Oppen bombarded the citadel, and demanded its surrender. In light of their superior artillery, the defenders flatly rejected this demand. However, even from a short-term perspective, there was little hope for the garrison. It had eighty guns, and a lot of war material, but only 1,000 men.

Such a garrison was way too small for 's-Hertogenbosch. Even so, it could have held out against Oppen's forces if it had been supported by the populace, but this was not the case. On the contrary, in the night of 6–7 January 1814 a resistance committee published its desire to get rid of the French on the streets of the town. The French were not able to find out who headed the resistance. Next, an alliance negotiator appeared on 15 January 1814, but he was sent back. The resistance then coordinated an uprising in the town with an assault from the outside. During the night of 25–26 January 1814 multiple city gates were assaulted from within the town and from the outside. The French were defeated, and retreated to the citadel. Now the victors could make very credible threats to the French, who were very far from their own army. On the morrow of taking the town, 26 January, the French capitulated on adverse terms. The officers were free to leave on promise of not serving for a year, but the soldiers became prisoners of war.

=== Construction of the first barracks ===
After the Belgian Revolution of 1830-1831, the military prison in the Citadel was abandoned, and became a ruin. The Revolutions of 1848 prompted the government to repair the fortifications of 's-Hertogenbosch. In June 1853 the minister of defense decided to tender the renovation of the prison as a barracks. The estimate was 18,000 guilders. In July the job was finally awarded for 13,700 guilders. The plan had been made by Mr. van Maaren. It included better lodgings for men and officers. Other measures were directed at creating the possibility to make the building 'bomb free', probably by packing earth against it. The attics of the building were lowered. In 1854 the last phase of the reconstruction of the fortress started when work on the citadel's walls commenced.

It seems that in 1855 the soldiers of the Tolbrug barracks were the first to use the new barracks. In 1858 the punishment battalion from Medemblik of 240 soldiers was quartered in the citadel. It was a good place for this battalion on account of the citadel's isolation, and there were many stories of soldiers attempting to escape. The municipality however was worried about the combination of this battalion with the 50,000 kg of gunpowder in the citadel.

== Non-fortified military use ==
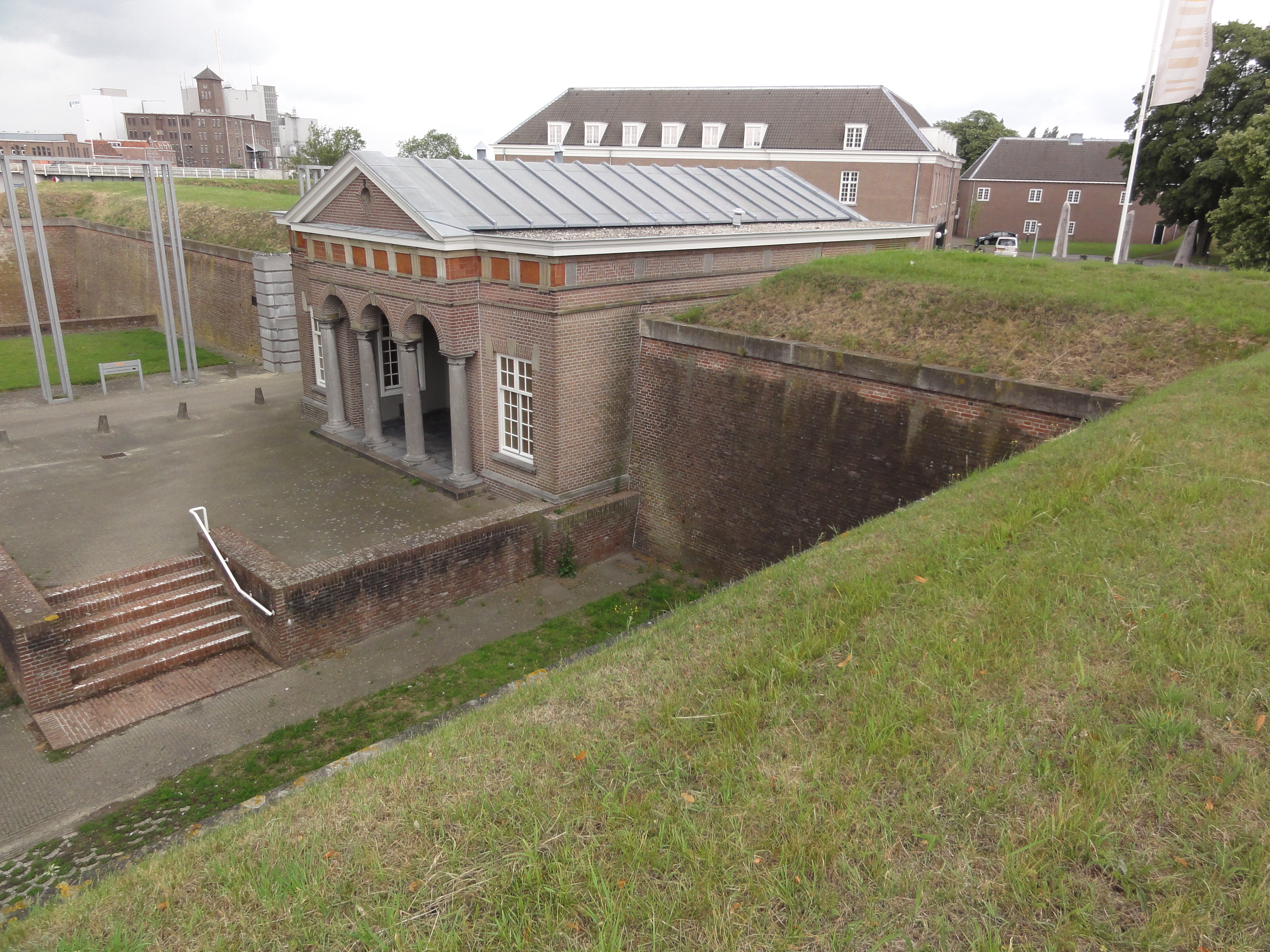
The 1899 guard house at the southern gate

=== 1870: The citadel becomes obsolete ===
During the whole nineteenth century the significance of the fortress and citadel had steadily diminished. In 1870 the citadel was 'mobilized' for the last time, but now it was only a small part of a fortified position that started at the 'Lunetten van Vught'. Furthermore, it was only prepared against a raid, not against a serious siege. The Franco-Prussian War of 1870-1871 changed the Dutch defensive strategy. It led to the 1874 Fortification law, which recognized that fortifications like the citadel were obsolete. It determined that the fortress 's-Hertogenbosch would be dismantled. The government remained owner of the citadel, but it no longer had a function in the city's defenses. The esplanade was returned to the municipality. The military would remain in the citadel till the 1960s.

=== NCO school (1869-1890) ===
In March 1869 the minister of defense wanted to improve the scientific education for non-commissioned officers in the infantry. Therefore all NCO's that entered into education to become a lieutenant second class were divided in two classes. The second class was given with each regiment, and led to the second class. The first class, which led to the exam for lieutenant 2nd class, would be given only in the major garrisons of 's-Hertogenbosch and Maastricht. In 's-Hertogenbosch this was the 5th regiment, which would have four lieutenants to give the course, known as 'Hoofdcursus' in Dutch. In April 1869 it became known that the citadel would be the home of the course, and three companies of the 1st battalion of the 5th regiment were moved out. The warehouse of clothing for the 5th regiment remained in the citadel.

During the 1870 mobilization of the fortress, the NCO's participating in the course were sent back to their regiments. Later the course was resumed. In 1877 there was a suspicion of fraud at the course in Maastricht, and so that school was disbanded, and the students divided over the remaining infantry institutes in 's-Hertogenbosch and Kampen. In 1880 the course for cavalry course NCO's was also split in two classes, and the first was merged into the infantry 'hoofdcursus'. The 'hoofdcursus' was given with the intention that all students were good enough to succeed, and would become officers. Therefore the number of students was related and limited to the number of officers vacancies. In 1883 the school had 59 students for the infantry, and six for the artillery, and was divided in two study years. On 1 October 1890 the school was merged with that in Kampen, and its building became available for a new purpose.

=== A bastion is lost to shipping (1880) ===
The Zuid-Willemsvaart was an important canal dug which had been dug between 1823 and 1825. It had been dug through the quite north-west side of the town's center, south of the citadel. In the succeeding years ships on the canal became bigger, and steam propulsion was introduced. Now it became increasingly troublesome to navigate in the small space between Bastion I, which stuck out into the canal, and the water gates of the town's harbor. This was not only a matter space, but also had to do with currents. In 1880, Bastion I was therefore almost completely demolished to facilitate shipping.

=== Second barracks (1890) ===
In 1890 the minister of defense asked to increase the 1891 budget by 42,000 guilders. He planned to change the main building and renovate the citadel, so a complete infantry battalion could be housed. The new barracks were finished somewhere in 1891-1892. The changes included four new wings that were attached to the building, resembling a letter 'H'. In 1899 the current guard house was built next to the southern gate.

== Current situation ==
In the 1980s a major restoration of the citadel began. In 1984 the four wings, which had been added to the 1789 building in 1891, were demolished again. Big concrete basements were dug out for a new use of the building as archives. During the excavations the medieval city wall and Orthen Gate were located.

The big building is now the home of the Brabants Historisch Informatie Centrum, a merger of the national archives for North Brabant and several community and other archives. The citadel is still owned by the state.

== Gallery ==
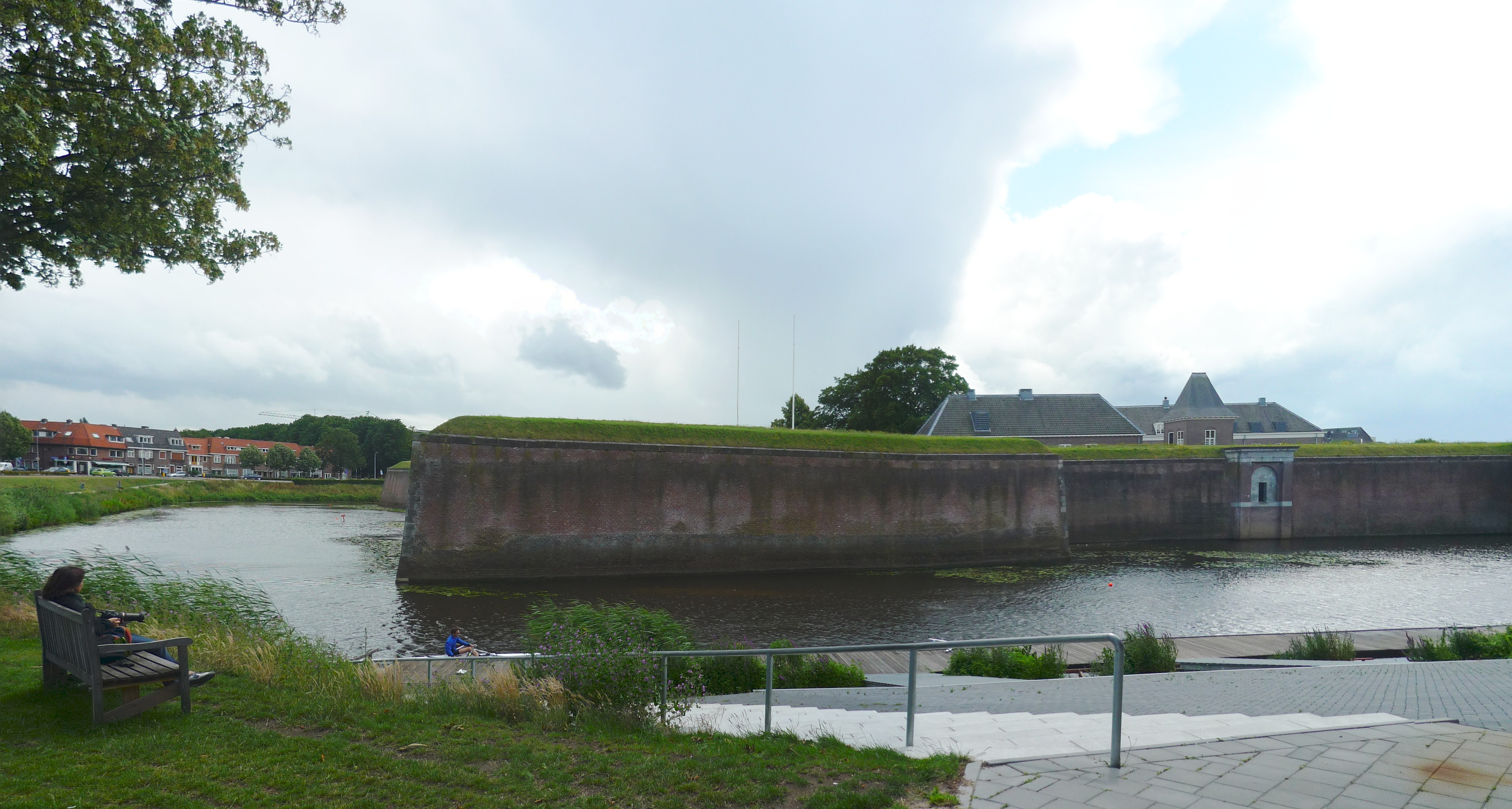
Moat and wall of the citadel

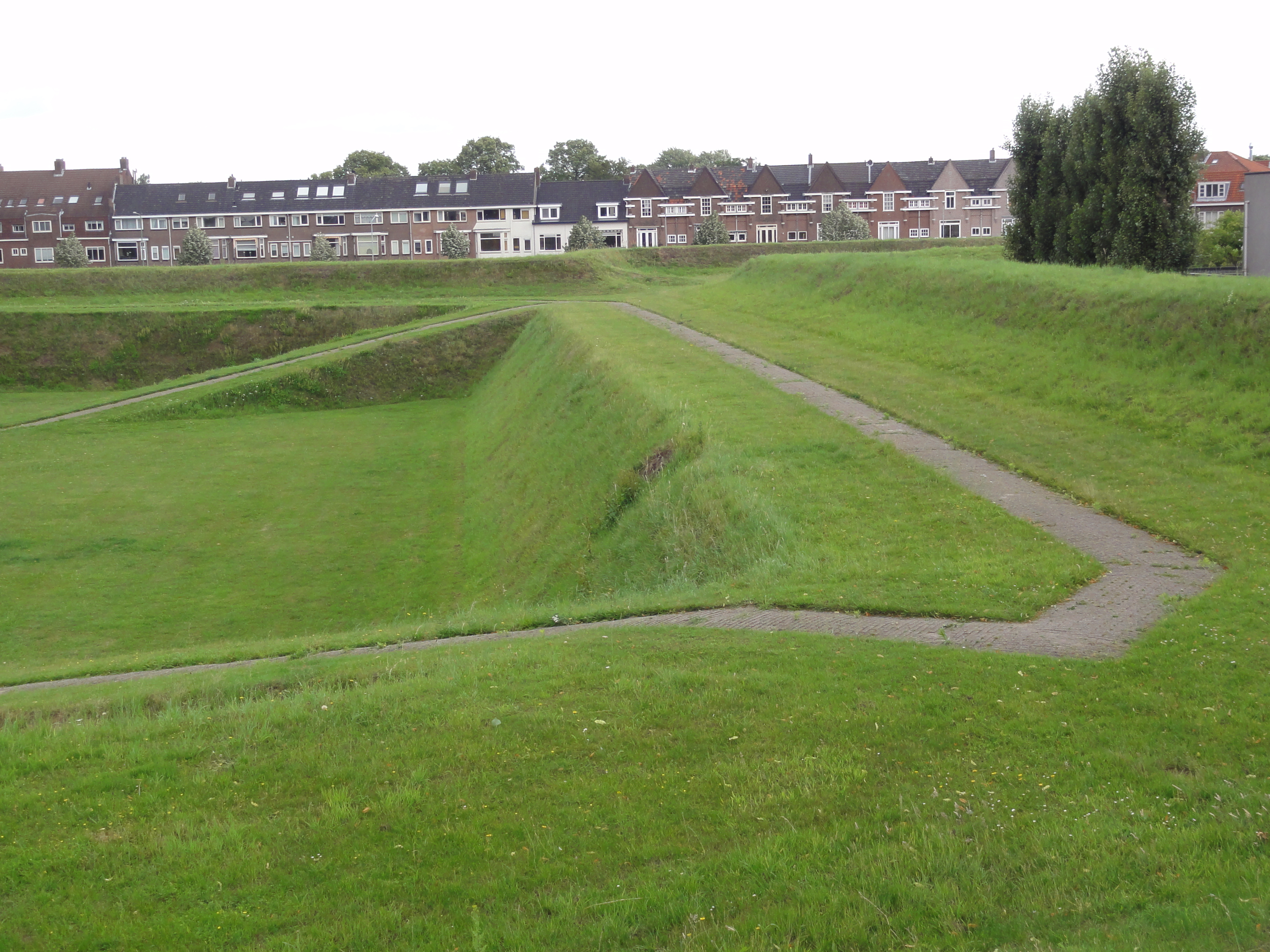
North east bastion from above

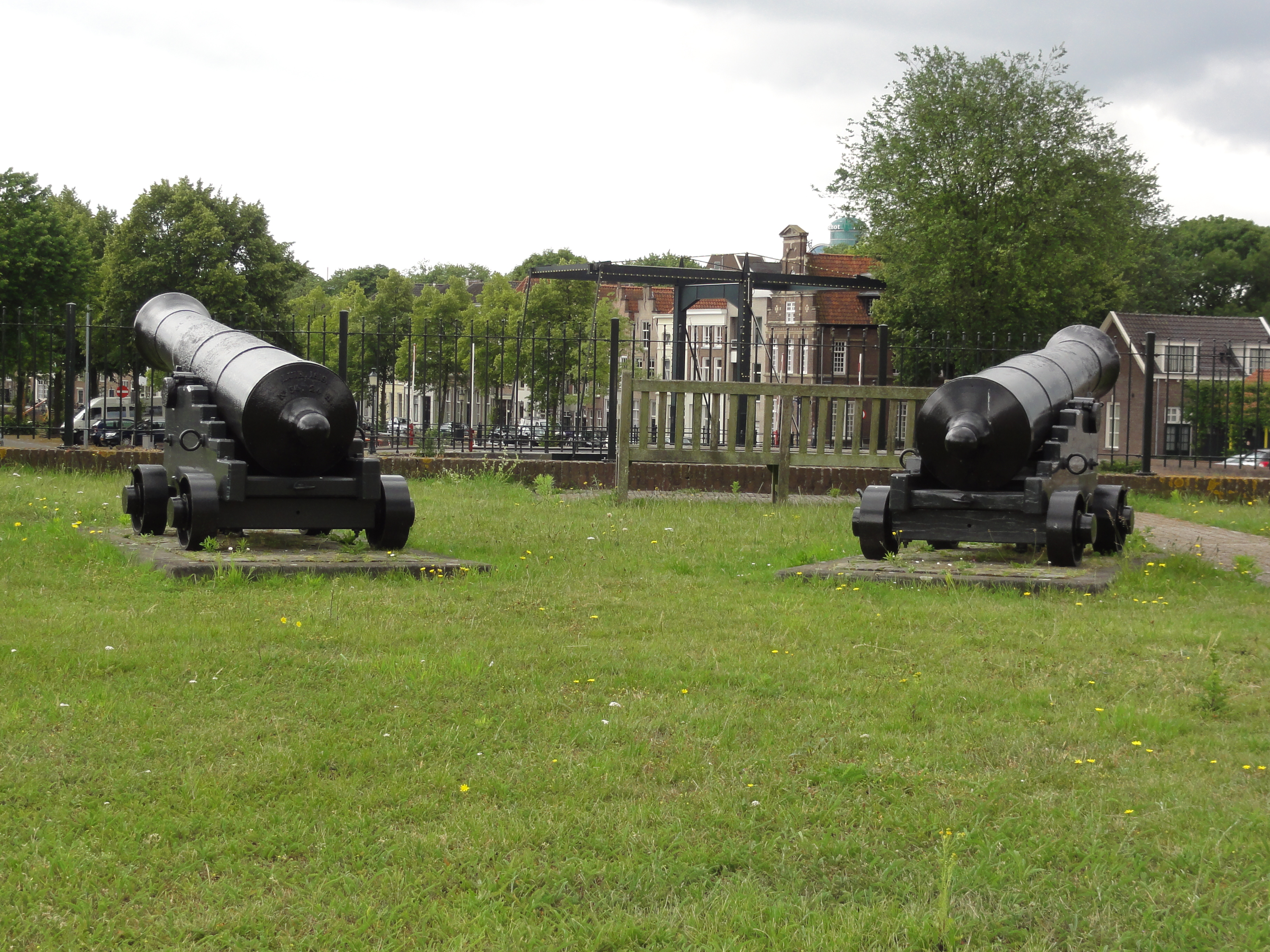
Two 24-pounders on the maimed southern bastion
