= Aa (Meuse) =

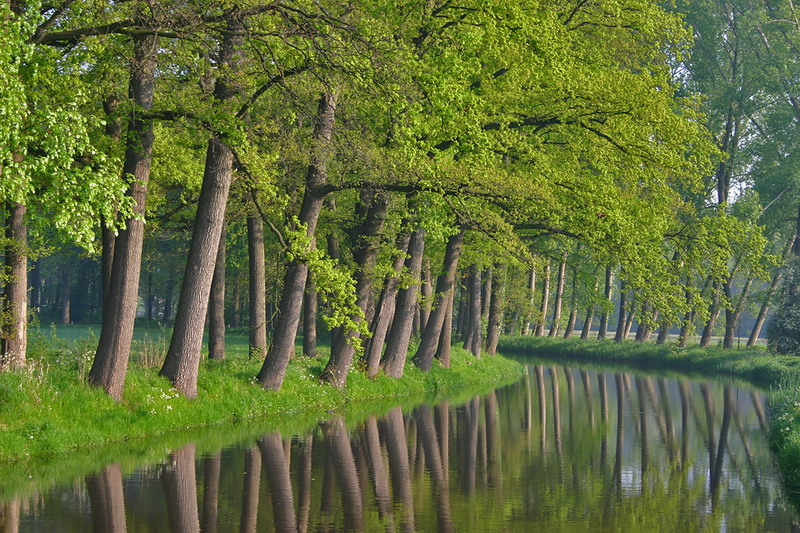
- The Aa in Beek en Donk

Location
- Country: Netherlands

Physical characteristics
- Mouth
  - location: Dieze
  - coordinates: 51°41′42″N 5°18′3″E

Basin features
- Progression: Dieze→ Meuse→ North Sea

The Aa (Dutch pronunciation: [aː]) is a small river in the Netherlands. It rises near Nederweert in the southeastern province of Limburg, in the Peel region. It flows northwest through the province of North Brabant towards 's-Hertogenbosch, roughly along the Zuid-Willemsvaart canal. In 's-Hertogenbosch, at the confluence of the Aa and the Dommel, the river Dieze is formed, which flows into the Meuse (Dutch: Maas) a few km further. The main cities and towns along the Aa's course are Asten, Helmond, Veghel and 's-Hertogenbosch.

== History ==
=== The old Aa was navigable ===
The current Aa is not as important as the former river. This is due to the Zuid-Willemsvaart, which has been dug in the drainage basin of the Aa from 1823 to 1826. The canal absorbs much of the water that would otherwise flow to the Aa. The Zuid-Willemsvaart was initially dug to be much wider than the Aa, but since then its width and depth accelerated, taking ever more water from the Aa. The role of the Aa in history can only be understood by considering its former state.

In the 1760s the Aa was navigable till the bridge of Erp, about 25 km from 's-Hertogenbosch. In 1839 it was still navigable till the lock of Erp. There are also reports that barges moved by poles and small boats could navigate the river till Koks, just north of Gemert, about 30 km from 's-Hertogenbosch. All this might actually point to the same place. Anyway, near the Koksehoeve in Koks, Gemert there was a harbor for barges to and from 's-Hertogenbosch, and this activity only ended after the Zuid-Willemsvaart was dug. It explains why Heeswijk Castle on the Aa, about 10 km from 's-Hertogenbosch, was such a strategic position for defending 's-Hertogenbosch against the Dutch Republic.

=== Plans to dig a canal ===
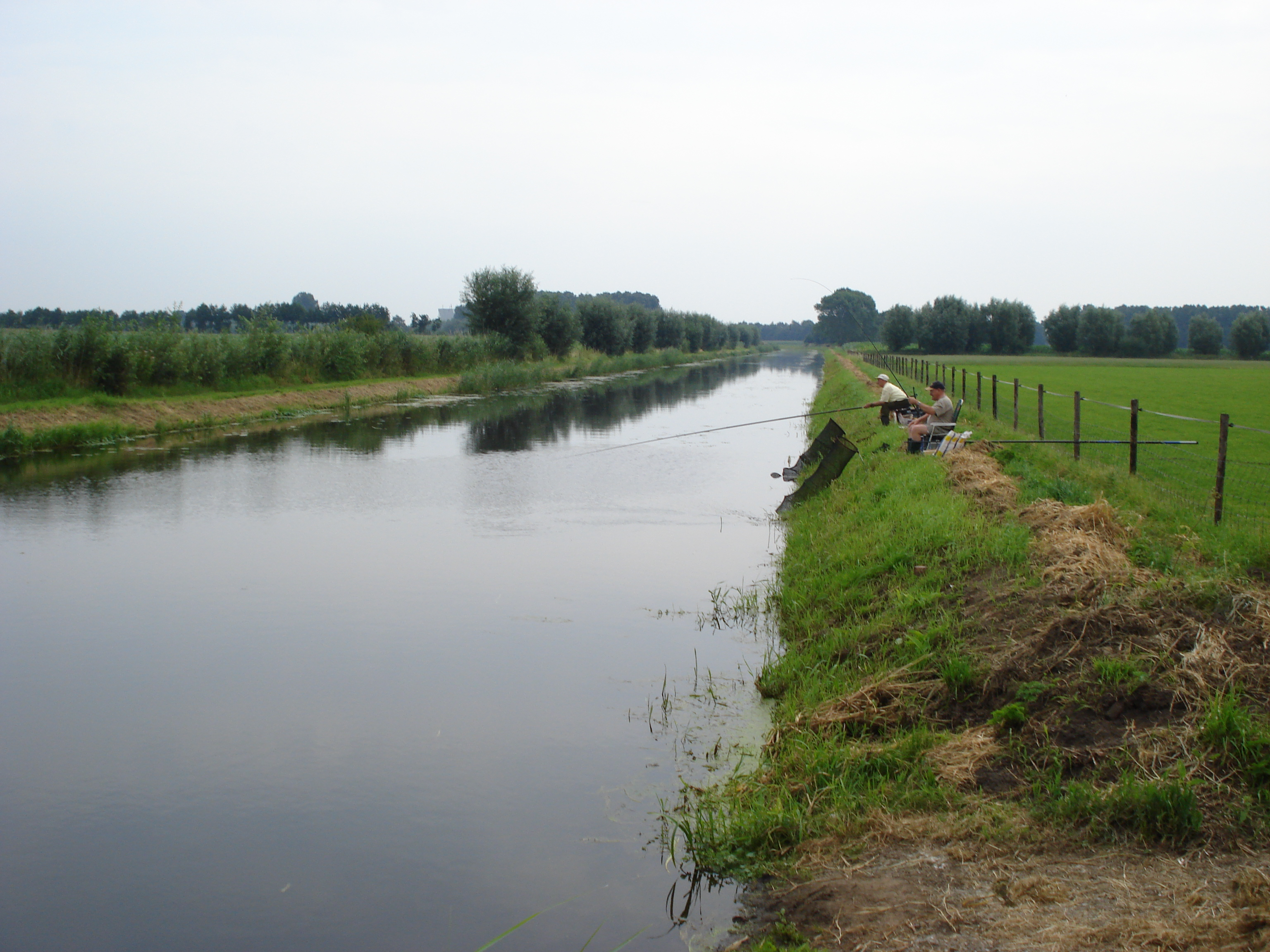
Canalized Aa near Erp 2008

In 1625 plans were made to make the Aa navigable from the Stipdonk mill at Lierop, south of Helmond to 's-Hertogenbosch. The idea was that peat and firewood from the Peel could then be moved more cheaply to 's-Hertogenbosch. In 1626 agreements were made with municipalities along the river, and in 1627 and 1628 locks were updated, and the Aa was brought to depth in some places. The 1629 conquest of 's-Hertogenbosch by the Dutch Republic cancelled this development.

When the Batavian Republic was founded in 1795, these plans were again considered. The first plan aimed to make the Aa navigable till Veghel. In June 1806 works to deepen the Aa and to dig some shortcuts were actually started. During the works, Roman coins were found at a depth of two feet four inches below the previous bed. By 1809 the construction of locks to achieve the Veghel plan was estimated at 68,000 guilders. On 16 March 1810 North Brabant was annexed by France. In the end, these plans to make the Aa navigable did not lead to a very significant result.

The plans for the Zuid-Willemsvaart were made for the drainage basin of the Aa. However, the idea was totally different. The previous plans aimed to develop the economy of Brabant. The plans for the Zuid-Willemsvaart wanted to improve communication between Liège and the cities of Holland.

=== More recent developments ===
After the Zuid-Willemsvaart had been dug, a more industrial approach to extract peat started in the raised bog of the Peel in 1853. As a consequence, the precipitation that was previously retained by the raised bog began to flow downstream with steadily less delay. It meant that the Aa had to process much more water. Therefore, in 1927-1929 two canals were dug around Helmond, and connected to the Zuid-Willemsvaart, so the water situation in the Peel could be improved. This was not sufficient, and so the Aa was normalized from 1934 to 1951, meaning that it was canalized.

=== Latest developments ===
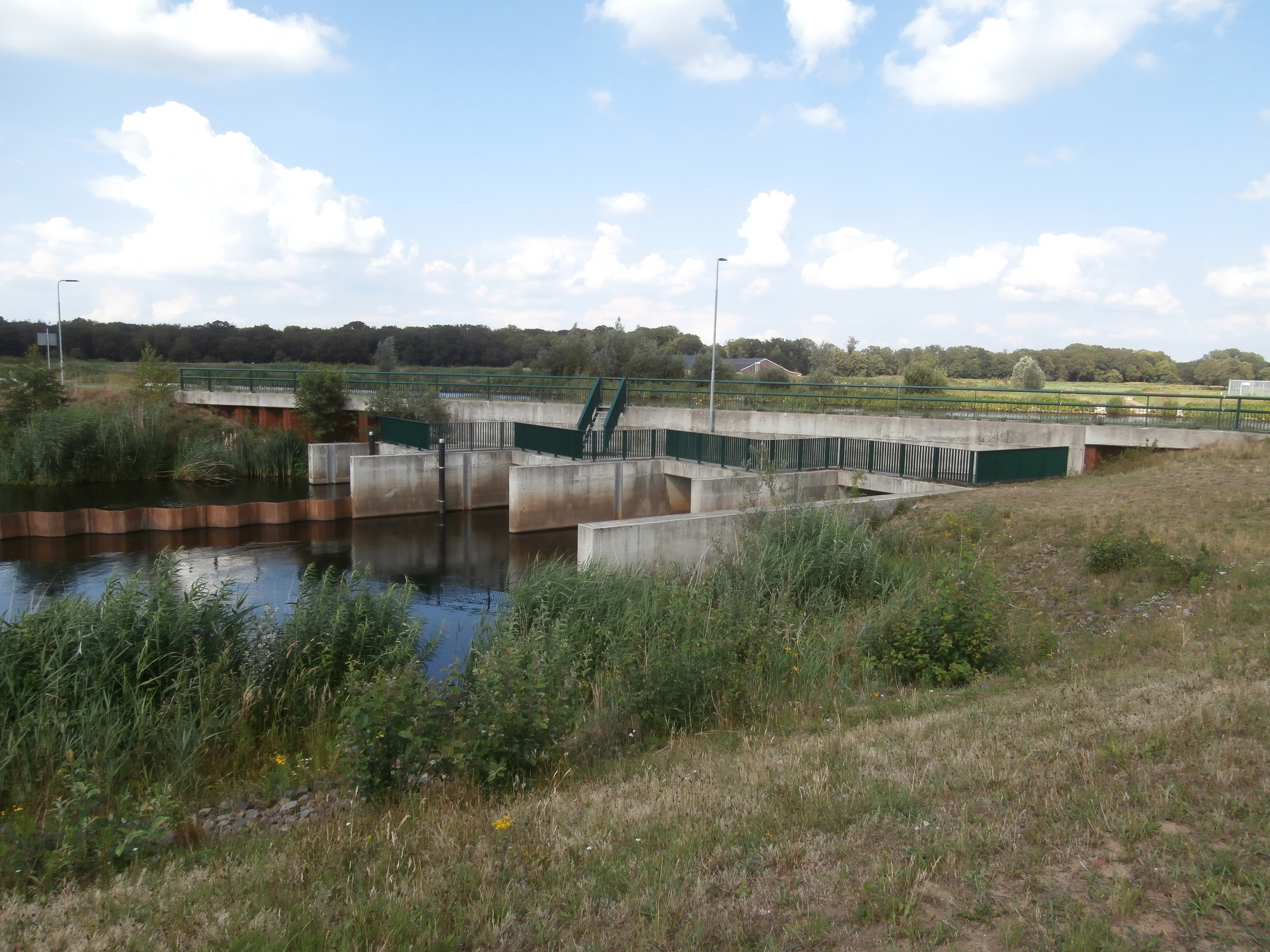
Aa - Maxima Canal crossing

In 1995 heavy rainfall upstream caused that the highway A2 near 's-Hertogenbosch was flooded for two weeks. In addition, there were fears that a massive evacuation would be required. One of the causes was a policy which had centered on getting rid of excess water as soon as possible, and to trust in technical measures to solve any problems. The events of 1995 changed this policy, and created focus for spillover areas, meandering, and restoration of streams and brooks. The aim is to prevent flooding by slowing drainage, and by temporarily storing excess water in spill over areas.

For the Aa it meant that many improvements for navigability, or to increase the speed with which it drains water downstream, had to be reverted. This was coordinated in the project 'Dynamisch Beekdal' (Dutch for dynamic brook-valley), which was executed from 2002 to 2017. The project made rigorous changes to the Aa from Heeswijk Castle to 's-Hertogenbosch. It combined safety measures with measures to restore the ecology of the river.

Meanwhile, the new Máxima Canal, opened in 2014, was dug straight through the bed of the Aa. The Aa was led below it, and so all navigation on the Aa east of the Maxima canal ended. In light of the intensity of recreational water traffic on the Aa in 's-Hertogenbosch, this is probably an advantage.

== Course ==
=== Near Heeswijk ===
The Heeswijk stretch of the Aa runs for about 5 km from the Kilsdonk Mill to Heeswijk Castle. It is currently under development to create an ecological connection zone, and to restore the river Aa. The Kilsdonk Mill is a rather unique combination of a windmill and a watermill.

=== From Heeswijk Castle to the Maxima Canal ===
The stretch of the Aa downstream from Heeswijk Castle till the Maxima Canal is characterized by the effects of the Dynamisch Beekdal project. In an almost contiguous strip of about 200 m wide, the Aa now meanders through the land, mostly in its original stream bed. There are also some cut off meanders present. Somewhat downstream of the castle, the brook Leijgraaf joins the Aa. Just before the Maxima Canal a new branch of the Aa, the Rosmalense Aa branches off from the Aa, and streams along the Maxima Canal to the Meuse.

In three places, dykes are now situated at some distance from the river. These places can receive over a million m^{3} of water in case of emergency. There are some bridges exclusively for cyclists and pedestrians. No roads have been made along the Aa, so tourists walking along the water are not hindered by wheeled commuters. Canoeing is now a major recreational activity on the Aa.

This stretch also has some cultural attractions. First of all Heeswijk Castle, which is the best known castle in North Brabant. Its position on the Aa, just upstream of 's-Hertogenbosch, explains why it was so important for such a long time. At the junction of the Aa is a building that remains from the medieval mill Ter Steen. Further downstream are the ruins of Seldensate Manor, which is often called a castle. It has a late medieval gate house, and the ruins are open to visitors.

A ford over the Aa was located just north of Seldensate Manor. In 2017 many Roman coins of little value were found nearby over a larger area. It allowed archaeologist to conclude that the ford shown on a 1832 map, already existed in Roman Times. The coins were interpreted as votive offerings related to crossing the Aa. North of the ford some foundation fragments of Kasteel ter Aa (Castle on the Aa) have been made visible. Ter Aa Castle was also more of a manor than a defensible building.

=== In 's-Hertogenbosch ===
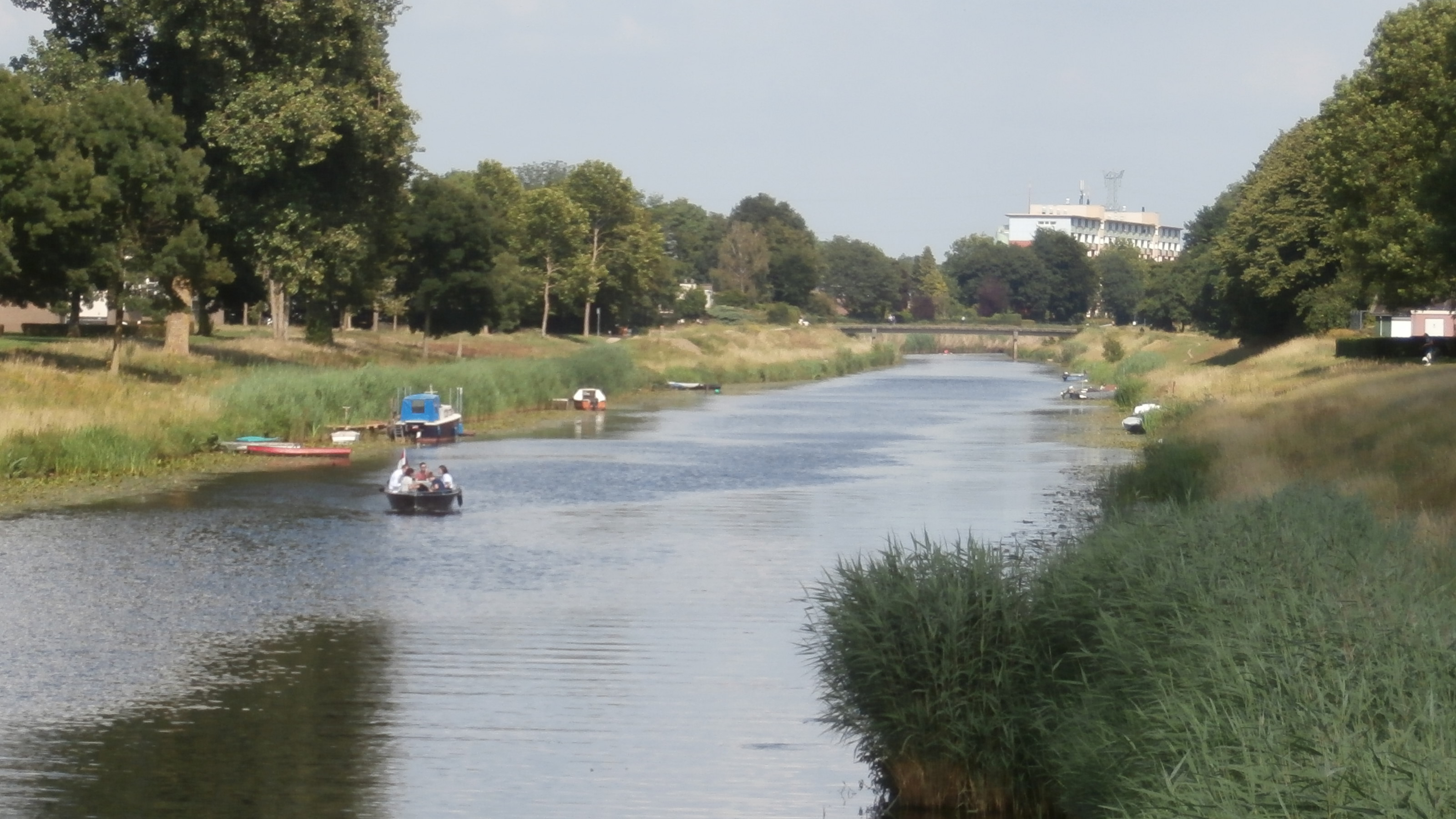
The wide Aa in Bois-le-Duc

Just east of 's-Hertogenbosch, the Aa meets the Maxima Canal. It does not cross the canal, but is led through tubes that run below it. This way, it is not caught up in the flow of the Zuid-Willemsvaart, which is regulated by locks. The Aa then continues under a bridge of the motor way A2. In 's-Hertogenbosch, the Aa is a wide canal that runs straight to the city center. After reaching the city center, the Aa flows along the northern city walls to join the Dommel just west of the Citadel of 's-Hertogenbosch. After that they continue jointly as Dieze.

In 's-Hertogenbosch many rowing enthusiasts use the Aa. There are also a lot of recreational boats lying around. Fishermen and swimmers are regularly found on the Aa. On the shore, there are some recreational bicycle lanes with a rather large amount of obstacles to keep out scooters. Inside the city some cultural attractions are situated directly on the Aa. The early seventeenth-century citadel stands out. The city walls east of it are lined with modest housing. Further to the east the Hinthamereinde has the city side of the lunettes of the Muntelbolwerk, and a very decorative nineteenth-century water tower. The Pastoor Bartenbrug is now a rather modest bridge. A previous attempt to (re-)build a bridge at this place was an exceptional engineering failure in 2012–2013.

== Ecology ==
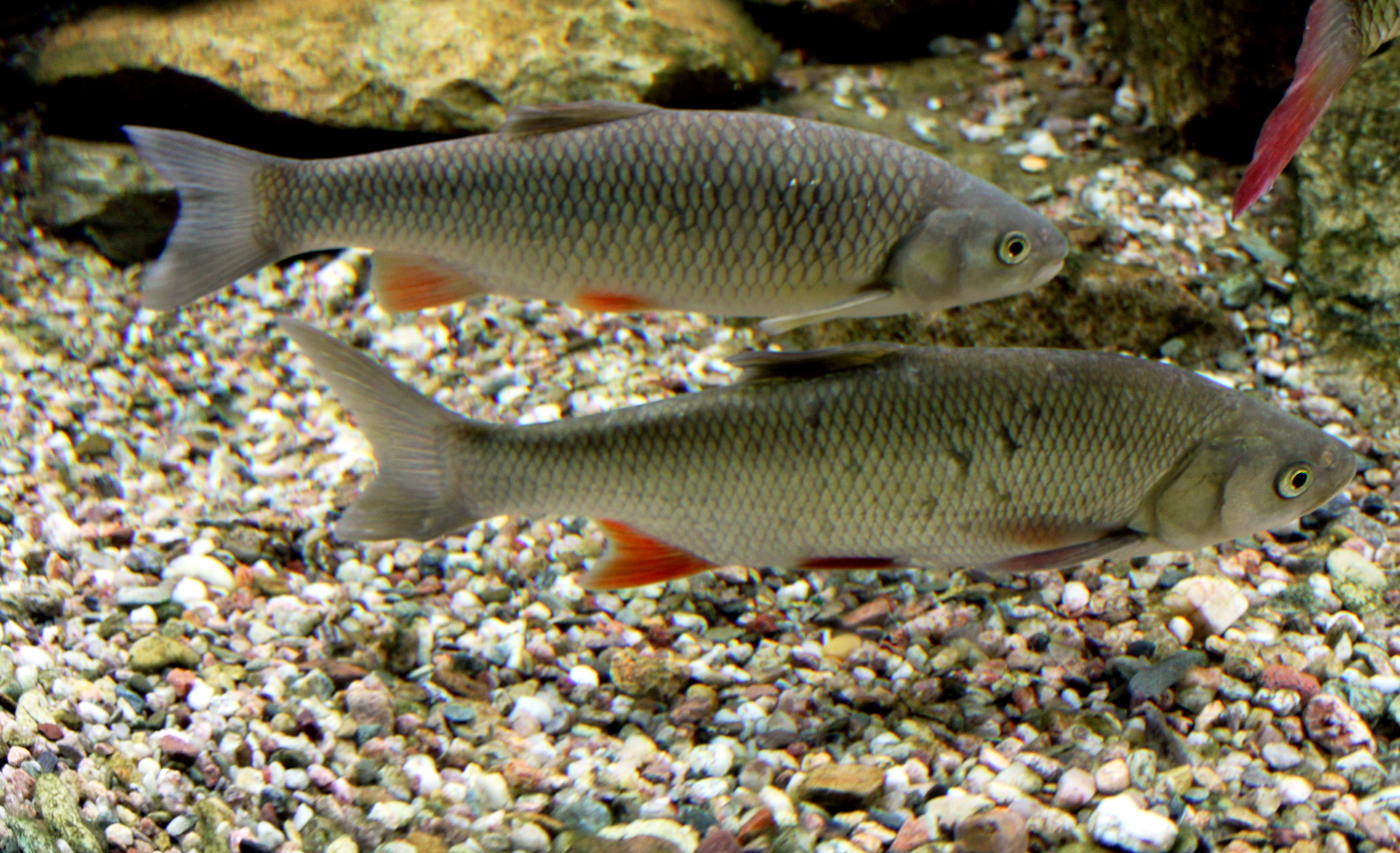
The European Chub

Along the stretch from Heeswijk Castle to 's-Hertogenbosch the project Dynamisch Beekdal has restored much of the ecological value of the Aa. Environmental processes that were typical for brooks, like shore-erosion, shoal-forming and local fast currents had been eliminated by the canalization. As a consequence, the oxygen content of the water, the shores, and the bottom of the river had decreased in quality. The project restored many of these ecological processes.

For marine life, the project created fish ladders in some places where the natural situation could not be restored. This was important because typical brook fishes had decreased and even disappeared, and had been replaced by the european perch and common roach. As a consequence of the project, the ecological diversity of fish in the Aa had indeed been restored by 2019. Volunteers of Ravon then found 15 species of fish, among these typical brook species like the Common bleak, Stone loach, and Gudgeon. Finding the European Chub, which had been extinct locally, was the final vindication of the project.

Above water the numbers of the marsh-marigold and the northern crested newt increased. With regard to insects Damselflies can be observed in high numbers. Stoneflies and Mayflies also profited. Finding the larvae of the Caddisfly was a highlight for the success of the project. With regard to birds there is hope that the Common Kingfisher, Sand martin, Marsh warbler, and Nightingale will profit.
