= Binnendieze =

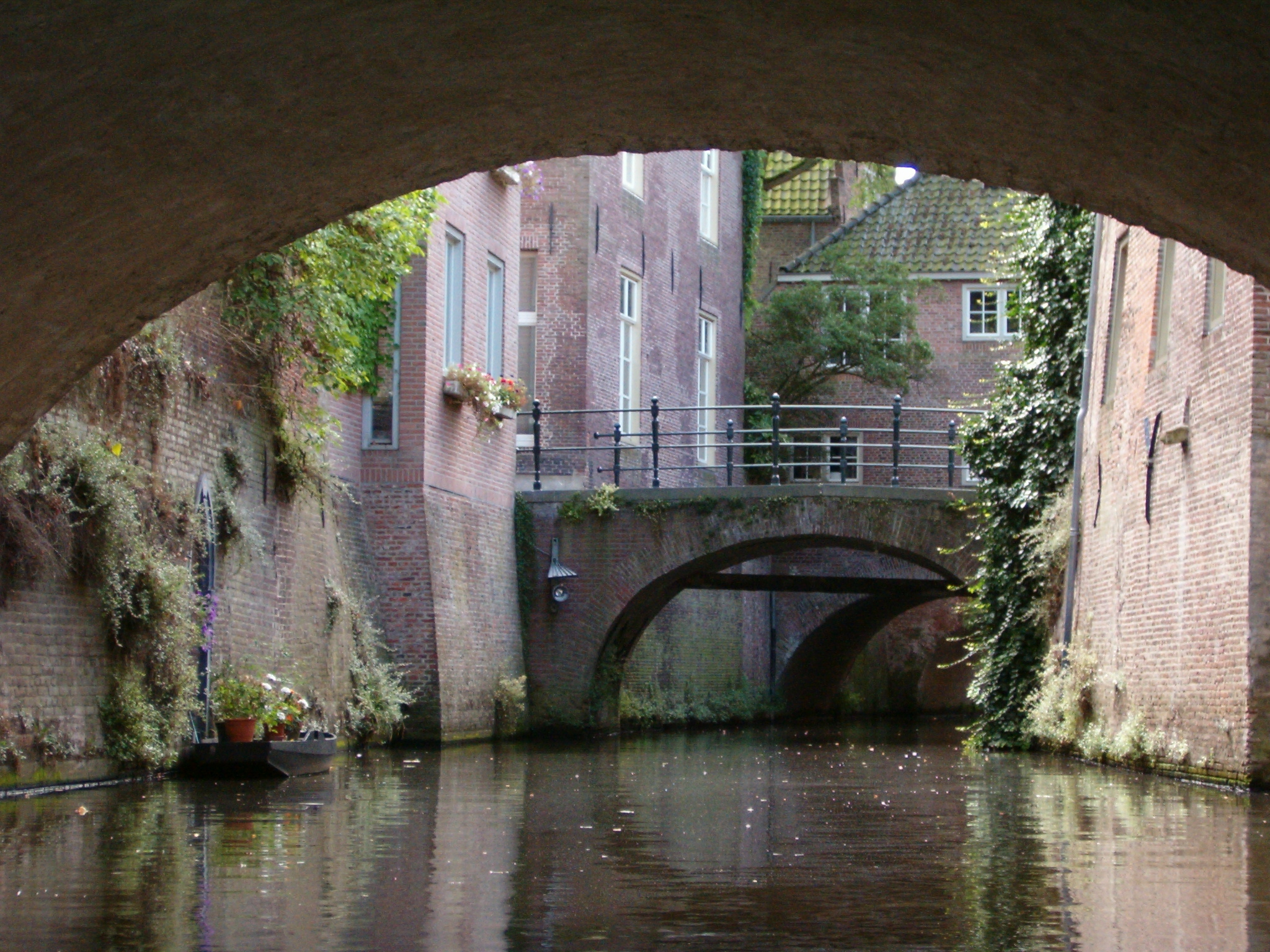

Location
- Country: Netherlands

Physical characteristics
- Source
  - location: Grote Hekel
  - coordinates: 51°41′7″N 5°18′29″E
- Mouth
  - location: Dieze
  - coordinates: 51°41′45″N 5°18′3″E

Basin features
- Progression: Meuse→ North Sea

Binnendieze is the common name for the river and canal system within the city walls of 's-Hertogenbosch, the Netherlands. It is a tourist attraction. Near the north-west tip of the city walls, the confluence of the Binnendieze with the rivers Aa and Dommel forms the short river Dieze, tributary of the Meuse (Dutch: Maas).

== Dieze and Dommel ==
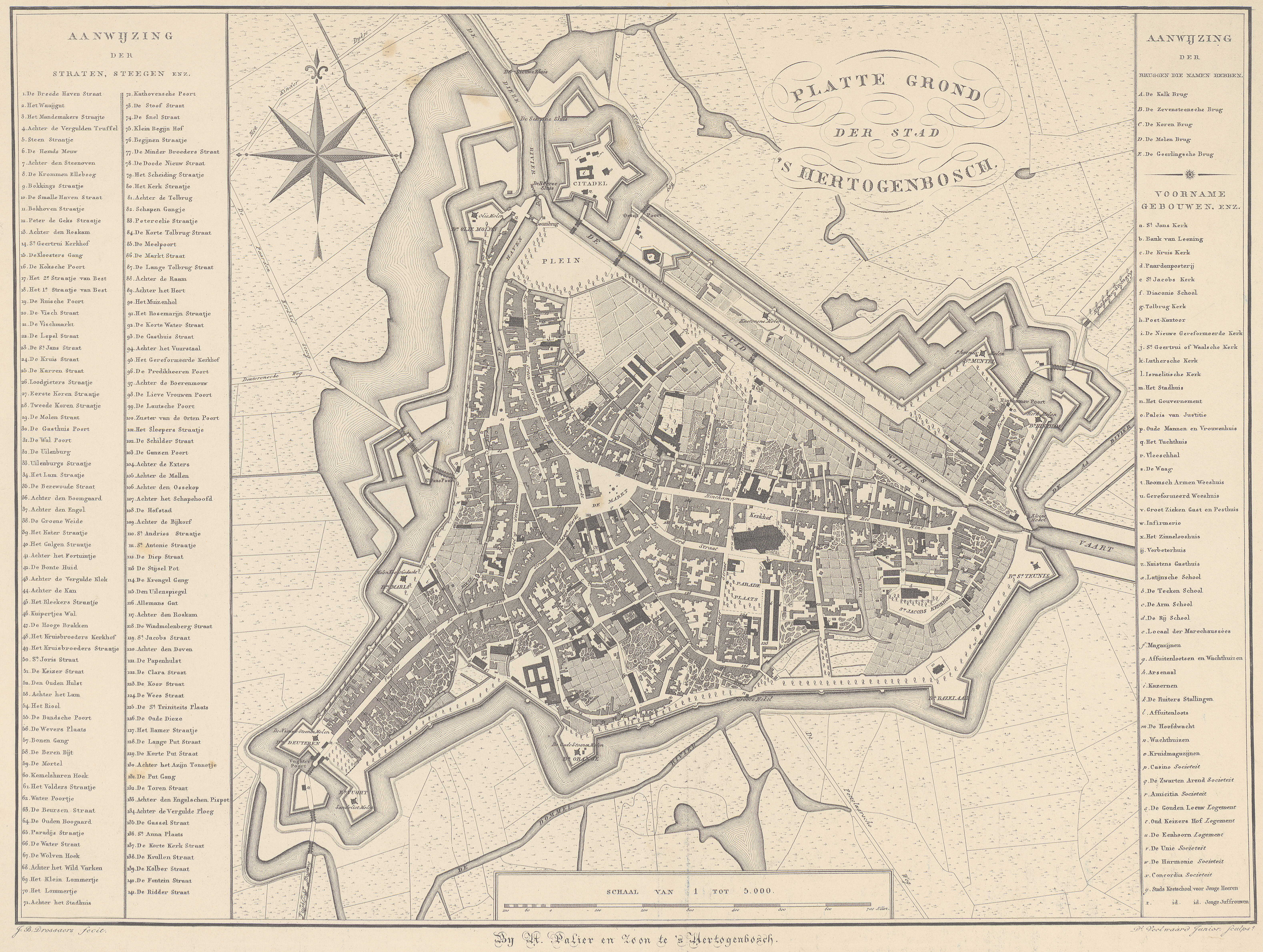
1850s map with Dommel

The Dommel originates in Belgium and flows through Eindhoven and 's-Hertogenbosch to join the Meuse. However, inside 's-Hertogenbosch and further downstream, the Dommel is known as (Binnen)Dieze. This has historic reasons. In the past, locals considered the Esschestroom, or Run, which runs from Oisterwijk to Halder, to be the main stream bed of the Dommel. Therefore they applied the name 'Dieze' to the whole stretch between Oisterwijk and the Meuse.

When the Dommel came to be considered the main river, the stretch of the Dieze between Oisterwijk and Halder was renamed Esschestroom, or Run. The stretch between Halder and 's-Hertogenbosch was renamed Dommel. Within the gates of 's-Hertogenbosch however, the Dommel retained the name 'Dieze', later changed to 'Binnendieze'.

When the fortifications of 's-Hertogenbosch were dismantled in the 1870s, the main stream bed of the Dommel was rerouted to the west of the city. It created the 'Nieuwe Dommel', which is now simply known as Dommel. It runs a more or less 'parallel' route with the 'Dieze'. The operation also created a new confluence of the Dommel with (a diversion of) the Aa. From a local perspective, however, these artificial diversions joined the Dieze, which was already flowing from the city harbor of 's-Hertogenbosch to the Meuse.

== The Binnendieze ==
=== The natural situation ===
The part of the Dieze inside 's-Hertogenbosch is known as Binnendieze, or inner Dieze. Before human intervention, the Dommel flowed to the east of the town and made a bend south and east of the Windmolenberg (a natural height). It then continued to where the Hinthamereinde now is. Here it joined the Aa, where now the western door of 'Sluis 0' (a lock) is situated. Together they then flowed west again.

=== The Groote Hekel ===
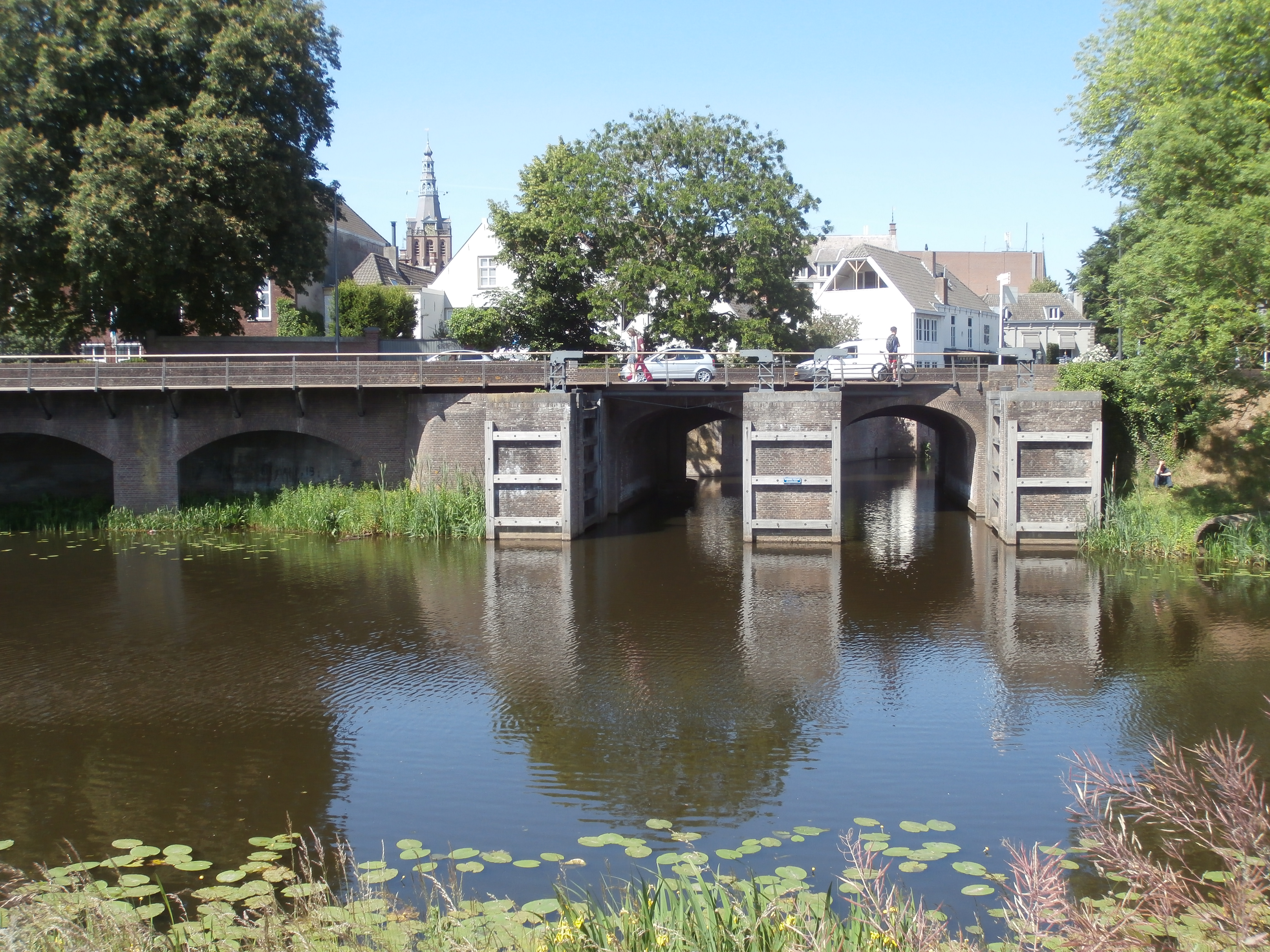
The Groote Hekel

When the second city wall was built in the fourteenth century, the confluence of the Dieze and the Aa came to lay inside the city walls. Another junction, the split of the Dieze and its runoff Verwerstroom, also came to lay within these walls. Just south of this split a water gate was built. It is named Groote Hekel, after the beams (Hekels) that blocked the water gates. From the Groote Hekel the main course Groote Stroom flows east, the smaller Verwerstroom flows west. Both became known as Binnendieze. However, the name was also applied to other streams in the city. Some of these were arms of the Dieze, others were artificially connected to it.

The water gate Groote Hekel was first mentioned in 1399. It originally had three gates, and was hence known as 'De Drie Hekelen'. It gave barges from the Dommel access to the city, and drained access water from the Bossche Broek. The westernmost gate was walled up from 1634 to 1668, probably to drain off less water from the militarily important Bossche Broek. Before 1880 the gates could be blocked against enemies, but could not block the water of the Dommel.

In 1880 a double lock was built on the outside of the two remaining gates. Therefore the medieval gates can only be seen from inside the city walls. While viewing these, another row of two big gates and one smaller gate is visible immediately east of the two remaining water gates. These are remains of a steam-powered pumping station built in the early 1880s, and broken up in 1965.

=== Groote Stroom ===
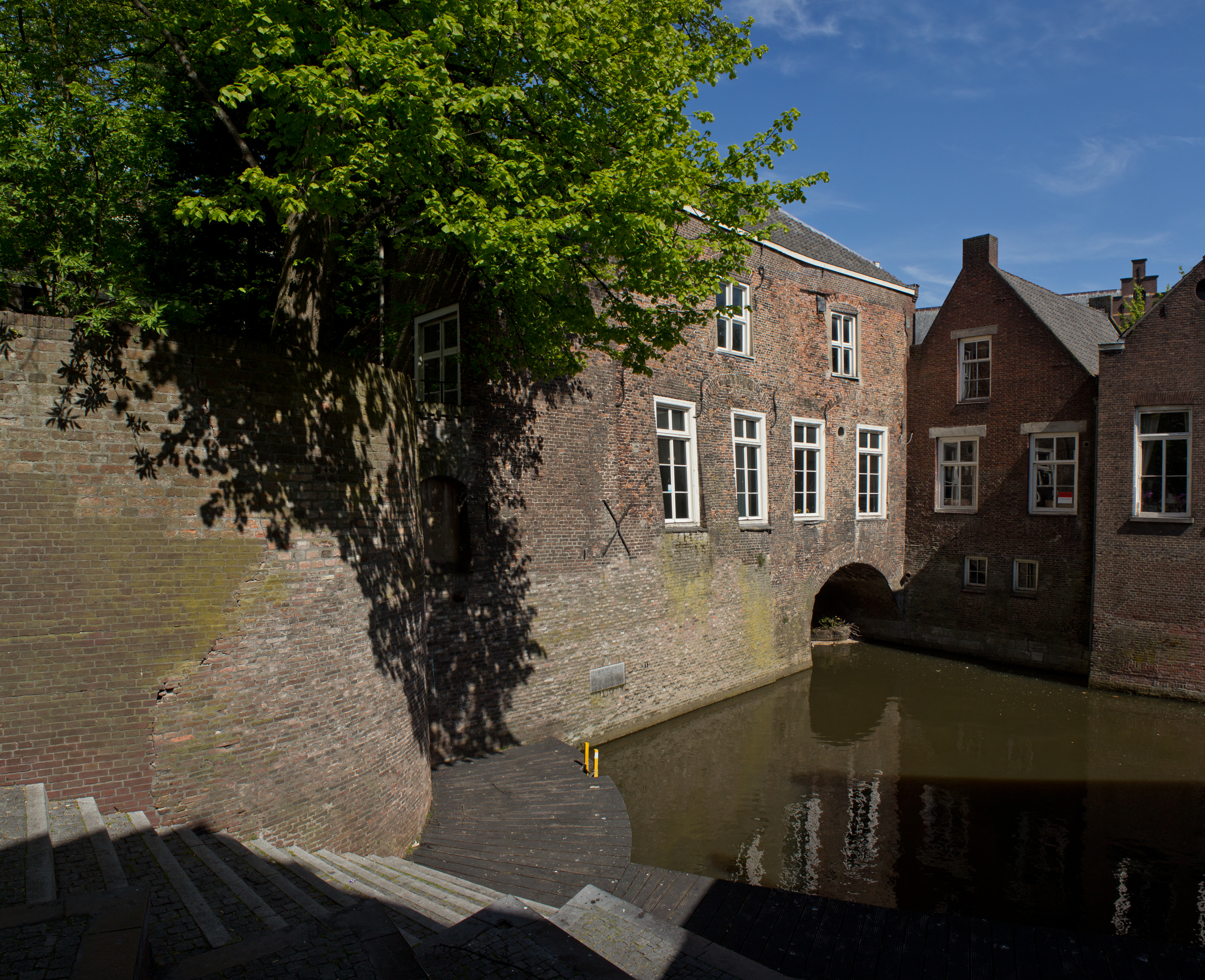
Watergate in first city wall

The original main course of the Binnendieze is known as Groote Stroom. It starts at the Groote Hekel in the southern city wall, and then bends to the east, before flowing back to the west, where it joins the city harbor at Jan Heins street. The complete course is difficult to discern because in 1962 the Marktroom and old city moat were filled up. There were also earlier interventions in its course.

When the first city wall was built in the early thirteenth century, part of the natural stream bed of the east-west stretch of the Grote Stroom (called Marktstroom) came to lay within the city walls. In the wall the current water gate was made. East of it, the Grote Stroom was diverted and led through the northern moat. The next major interference was a connection between the Grote Stroom and the Vughterstroom north of the first city walls. This was achieved by digging the stretch that now runs along the Jan Heinsstraat, probably in 1250-1275. In 1300-1319 a large bend of the Groote Stroom was cut off. It led to the construction of the Geerlingse bridge in the Hinthamer street.

The Groote Stroom has some of the most spectacular sights of the Binnendieze. The water gate in the first city wall is one of these. It is remarkable that such a gate, that was superseded by later buildings, survived. Its location was crucial, because it could only be reached by water. This gate has grooves where beams could be inserted to stop the water of the Dieze. It is not clear whether there was a relation with the absence of such capabilities at the Grote Hekel.

=== Doode Stroom ===
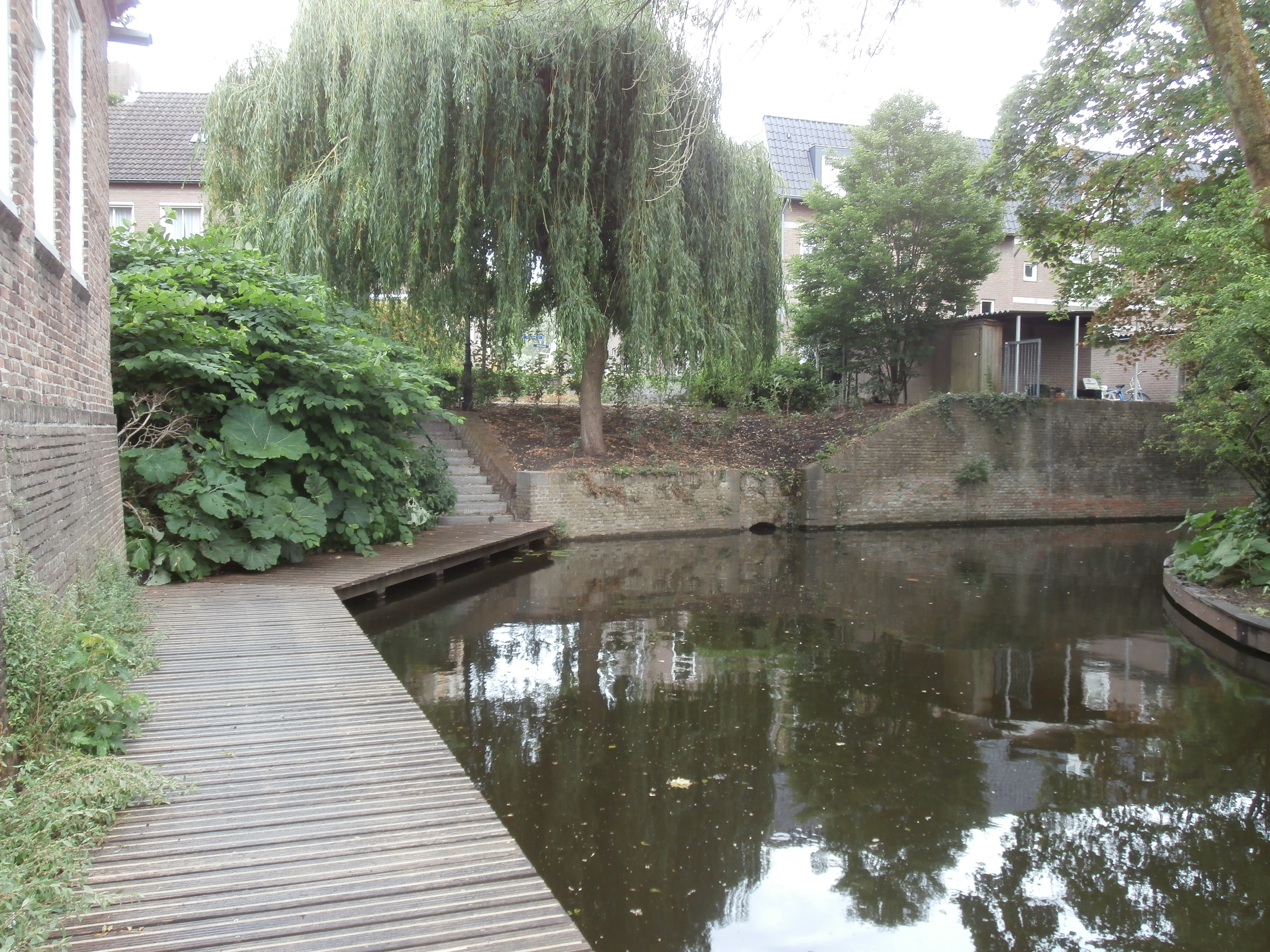
View towards Doode Stroom

The Doode Stroom is a filled up part of the bend which was cut off from the Groote Stroom in 1300–1319. This bend continued to exist for over 500 years. The northern part continued to be the connection between the Aa and the remaining Grote Stroom as it now exists. The southern part led through a quite part of town. During the construction of the second city wall in the fourteenth century, a water gate called 'Kleine Hekel' was built. It enabled barges from the Aa to enter the city, and to continue on the northern stretch. A diversion of the Aa was made to feed the new northern city moats. The southern stretch gradually started to disappear from the maps in the eighteenth century.

During the construction of the Zuid-Willemsvaart in the 1820s, the Kleine Hekel north of this canal, was demolished, and the stretch of the Binnendieze from the Kleine Hekel to the Groote Stroom was cut off from the Aa. Hence it became known as 'Doode Stroom' (dead stream). The Doode Stroom did not receive much fresh water, and therefore began to stink. It was one of the first streams that got a sewer and was filled up, the small part east of 'Achter de Mollen' in 1922, the rest in 1929.

In 2018 urban development led to an unlikely rediscovery of the Doode Stroom close to the Zuid Willemsvaart. Below the Europeesch Keramisch Werk Centrum (EKWC) a cellar was found that contained the quay walls and the intact former bridge of the ally Achter de Mollen. It turned out that after the stream had been diverted through a tube, the stream had simply been bridged by steel beams covered by masonry. The municipality and the project developer immediately conferred to profit from this circumstance. Making the small bridge visible would be good for tourism, but would also significantly increase the price of buildings on the premises. By mid-2020 the project was still in progress.

=== Verwerstroom ===
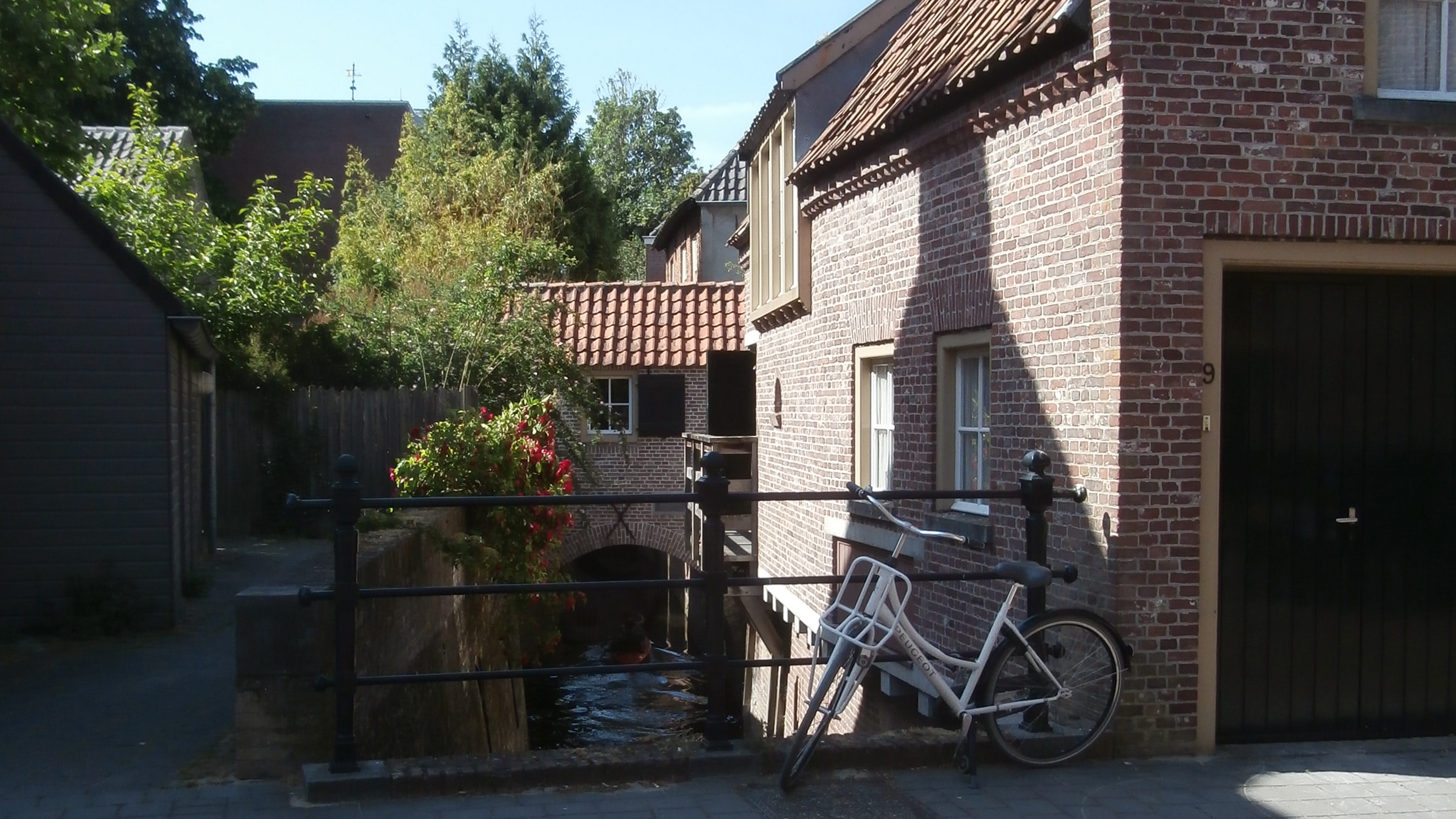
Verwerstroom with canoe

The Verwerstroom is a natural, smaller branch of the Dommel / Dieze. It splits off from this river immediately behind the city walls at the Groote Hekel. The part of the Verwerstroom between the Groote Hekel and the Noordbrabants Museum follows a (natural) river bed. Here street names like Verwerstraat, Volderstraatje and Raamstraatje (no name plate) remind of woolen cloth-making. 'Verwer' is Dutch for someone who dyes cloth. Fulling (Dutch: Vollen) was a dirty job to felt woolen cloth. After that cloth had to be rinsed out and was made to dry on racks (Dutch: Ramen).

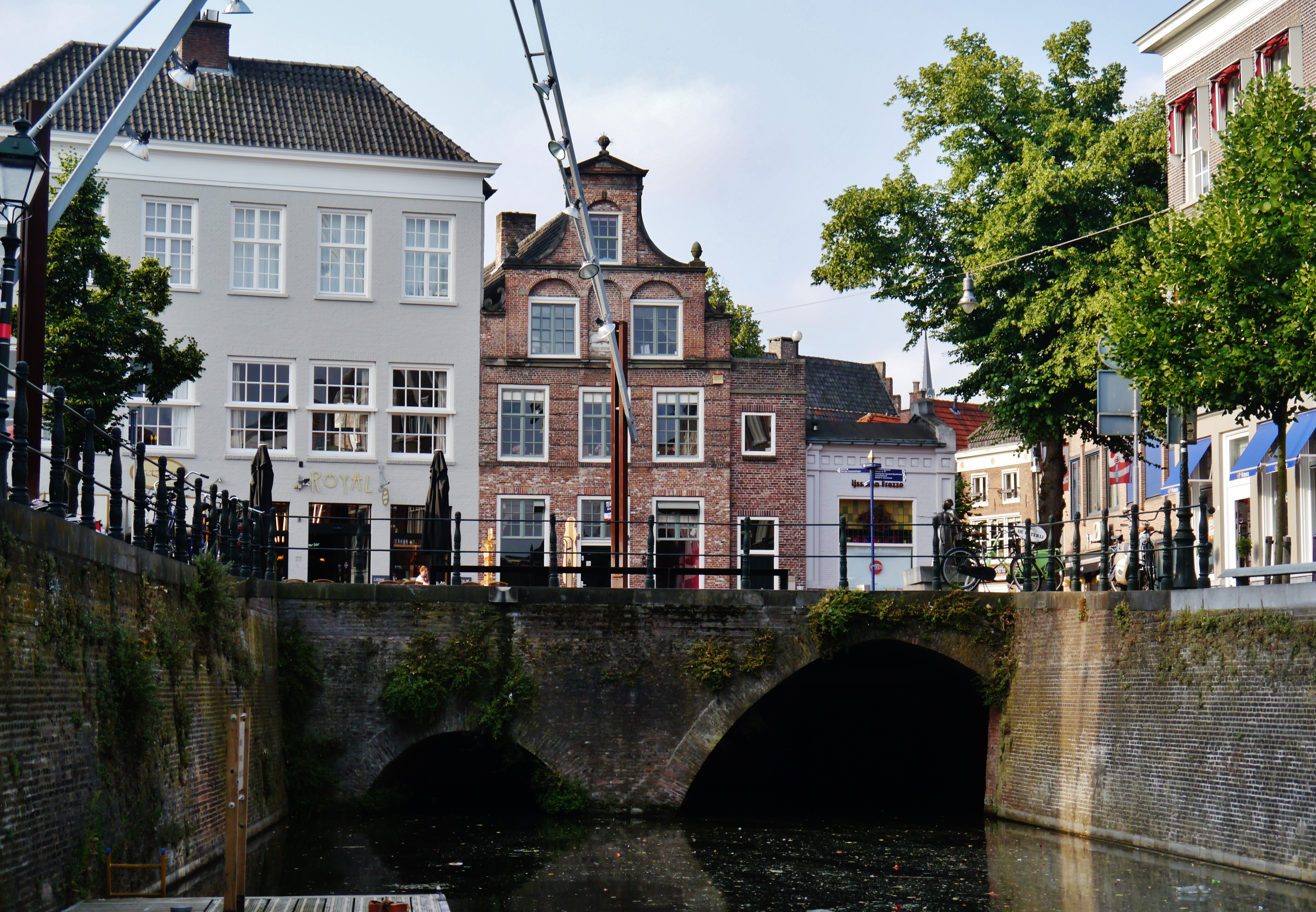
The Verwerstroom exited at the northern arch of the Visbrug

The part north of the museum, north of the junction with the 'Kleine Vughterstroom' was dug to bring water to the first city walls. It continues along these former walls towards the north-west, along the Snellestraat. Just north of the junction of the Snellestraat and the Postelstraat, the Verwerstroom abruptly turns west. All this establishes a connection from the Groote Hekel to the city harbor, which is fed by the Vughterstroom.

The original confluence of the Verwerstroom with the Vughterstroom was at the Visbrug. When the second city wall was built in the second half of the fourteenth century, the stretch of the Verwerstroom along the Kruisstraat from its last bend near Guardianenhof till the Visbrug was filled up. This explains the unnatural bend at Guardianenhof. It also explains the north arch in the Visbrug. This is the original exit of the Verwerstroom, which was made visible again in 1976.

Nowadays the southern part of the Verwerstroom can be viewed from bridges on the Zuidwal, Volderstraatje, Beurdsestraat, Oud Bogardenstraatje, Paradijsstraaje, the Waterstraat (Noordbrabants Museum), and Klein Lombardje. The highlight of this part of the Verwerstroom is its passage right before the facade of the Noordbrabants Museum. In the Snellestraat it is only visible in two places. At Guardianenhof there is a view of the Verwerstroom that shows that it changes course by flowing under a bridge in the Postelstraat. Indeed the prime attraction of the Verwerstroom and other parts of the Binnendieze, is that houses were built over it. It means that the Verwerstroom can still be navigated, but is hardly visible from the street.

=== Vughterstroom ===
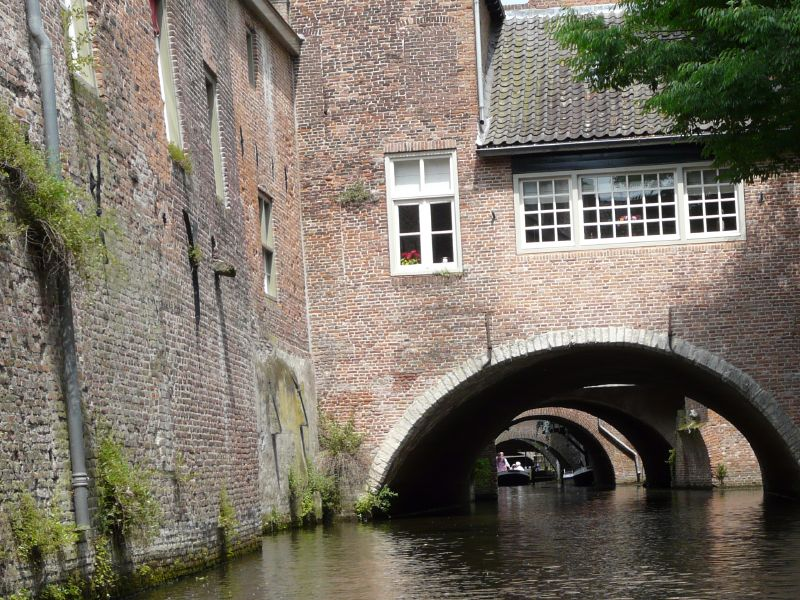
Vughterstroom

The brook Vughterstroom started as an arm of the Dommel at the height of Fortress St Anthony. It then continued west of the city, probably in a bed between the current Dommel and the railway station. It touched the city again where the citadel now is. From there, it roughly followed the course of the present Dieze. Before the Dieze was 'created' in the fifteenth century, the main course of the Dommel/Dieze streamed way east of it. The Vughterstroom joined this course way north of the city, probably near Engelen.

In the thirteenth century (probably 1250-1275), the sand ridge to the west of the Grote Stroom was dug through, creating a connection from a bend in the Vughterstroom to the Groote Stroom. The city then started to dig towards the south till the Korenbrugstraat to create a harbor. The natural Vughterstroom had to be diverted through this harbor to keep it deep enough. Therefore a canal was dug south of the Korenbrugstraat till it met the natural Vughterstroom between Lamstraatje and Capucijnenpoort. The dug stretch from the harbor together with the natural upstream part till its junction with the Kleine Vughterstroom, is now called Vughterstroom. When the second city wall was built in the fourteenth century, the Vughterstroom came to lay inside the walls, with a water gate on the Kuipertjeswal. The natural part south of the junction with the Kleine Vughterstroom, including the water gate has been filled up.

The Vughterstroom is now one of the most famous parts of the 'Binnendieze'. The street that runs alongside it is very quiet and has many views on the water. The northern part has many cafés, restaurants and terraces. This is also one of the starting points for the popular boat trips on the Binnendieze.

=== Kerkstroom ===
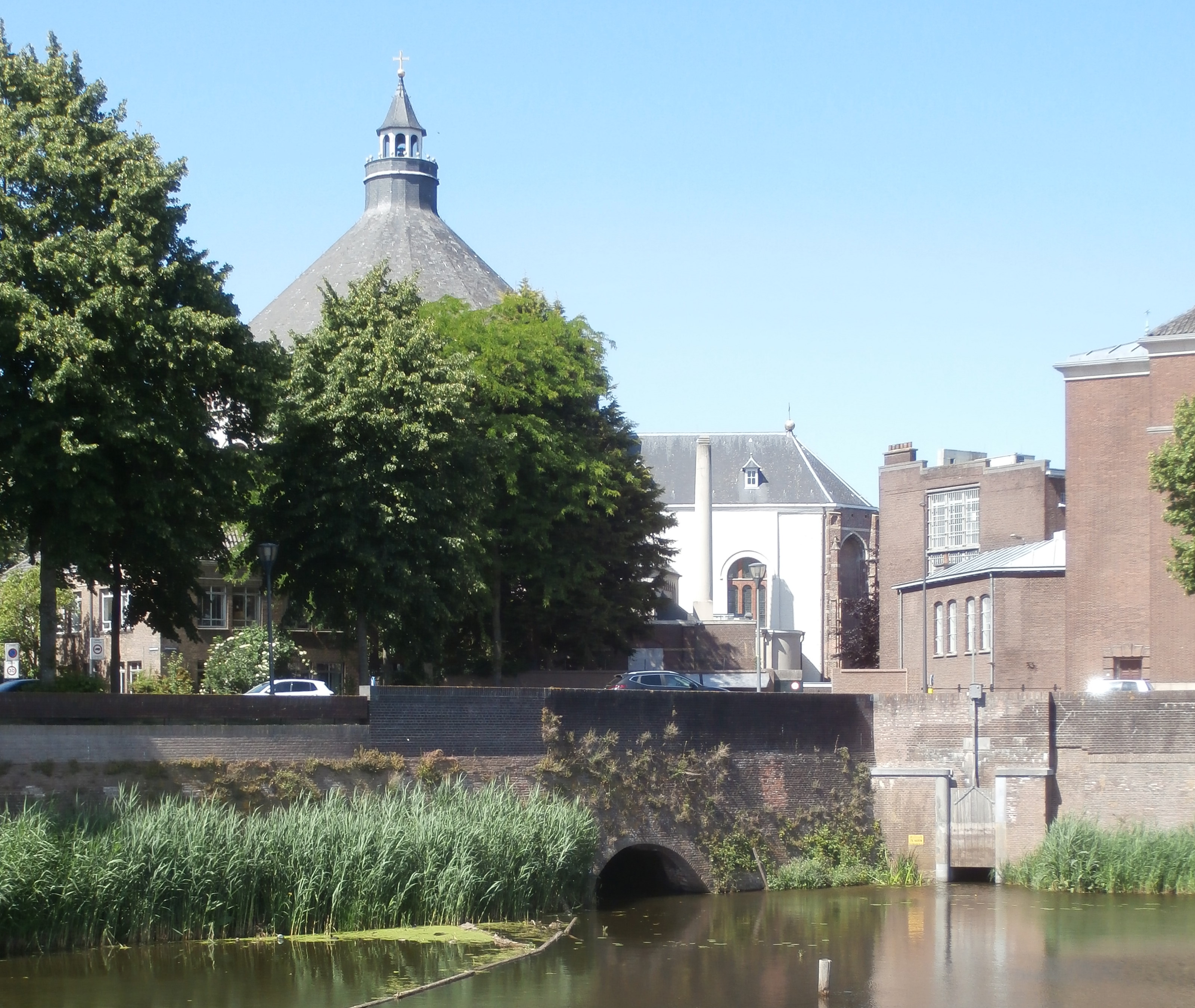
Entrances to Kerkstroom

The Kerkstroom is named for flowing under the choir of St. Catherine's Church. It is a short natural stream that exits into the Kleine Vughterstroom. From the city moat there are two entrances to the Kerkstroom. Both are called Kruisbroedershekel. The old Kruisbroedershekel was rather narrow, but nevertheless required a 'Hekel' to close it. It was only in 1880 that it was transformed into a sluice. The new Kruisbroedershekel dates from 2002, and was made to (again?) give boats access to the Kerkstroom. From a low hole in the wall west of the old Hekel, a corridor starts through the walls. Inside a room was made which shows the fourteenth-century second city wall and a 16th-century gate which was found during construction. The corridor continues to exit in the Kerkstroom just behind the wall.

St-Catherine's church dates from 1913. It has the choir of a previous medieval church. To be more precise: the choir was part of a medieval church that was destroyed when another church was built in the 1840s, retaining the medieval choir. In turn the 1840s church was demolished, but again the choir was spared. It no doubt has to do with the construction of the choir over the Kerkstroom. The house immediately north of the church shows that it has been built right on top of the Kerkstroom, because it has an arch running through the ground floor of the facade. Continuing to the north for a few houses along the Kruisbroedersstraatje, a bridge over the Kleine Vughterstroom announces the end of the Kerkstroom.

=== Kleine Vughterstroom ===
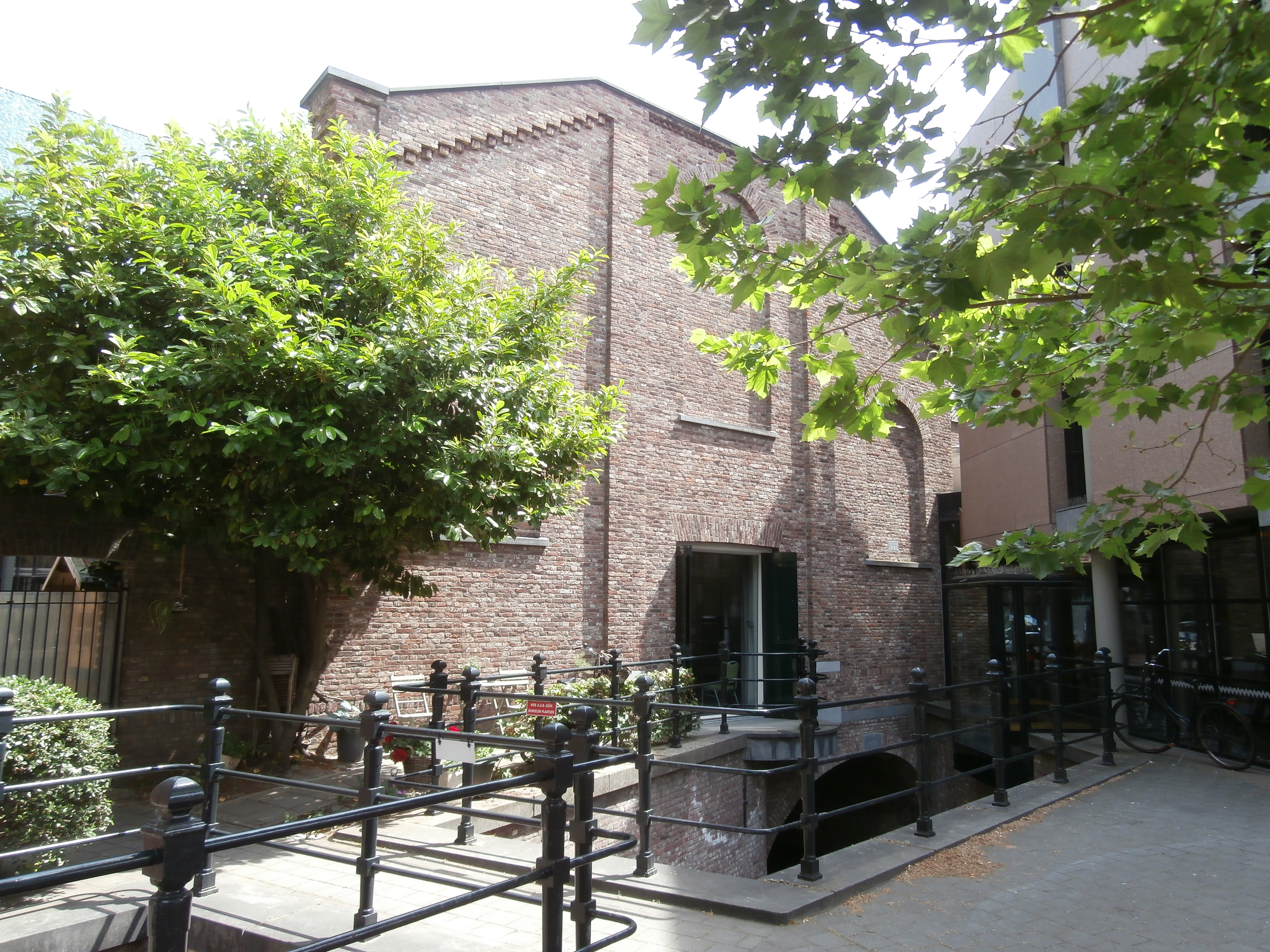
Under the Synagogue

The Kleine Vughterstroom is a natural brook. It diverts from the Verwertroom just north of the Noordbrabants Museum. It starts as a very long built over stretch, known as the Hellegat. Just west of the former synagogue it surfaces for a few meters on Prins Bernardstraat. It again surfaces for a rather long stretch along the garden of the offices of the municipality, but this is away from the public eye. The Kleine Vuhgterstroom then crosses Sint Jorisstraat unseen. Its second public appearance is east and west of a small bridge in Kruisbroederstraatje, near its junction with the Kerkstroom. On foot, the western stretch can also be observed from the Kruisbroedershof. After disappearing, the Kleine Vughterstroom surfaces again in a closed-off space, before diving under Vughterstraat.

The Kleine Vughterstroom is probably the least known part of the Binnendieze. It is publicly visible on street level in two places only. However, on a boat trip the Kleine Vughterstroom does offer some spectacular sights. The first is the Hellegat, a stretch of about 100 m. In 1884 the part in the garden of what now is the Noordbrabants Museum was covered up. It created a corridor that is so long that it achieves complete darkness. In 1966 the foundations of the assembly room of the provincial representative body of North Brabant, which was located above the Hellegat, collapsed. Public servants had to scramble to save important documents, and to diminish floor pressure on these foundations. These were repaired with a simple concrete construction. The other sight on the Kleine Vughterstroom is the hidden stretch just before the crossing of the Vughterstraat, though most of this technically belongs to Vughterstroom.

=== Binnenhaven (inner harbor) ===
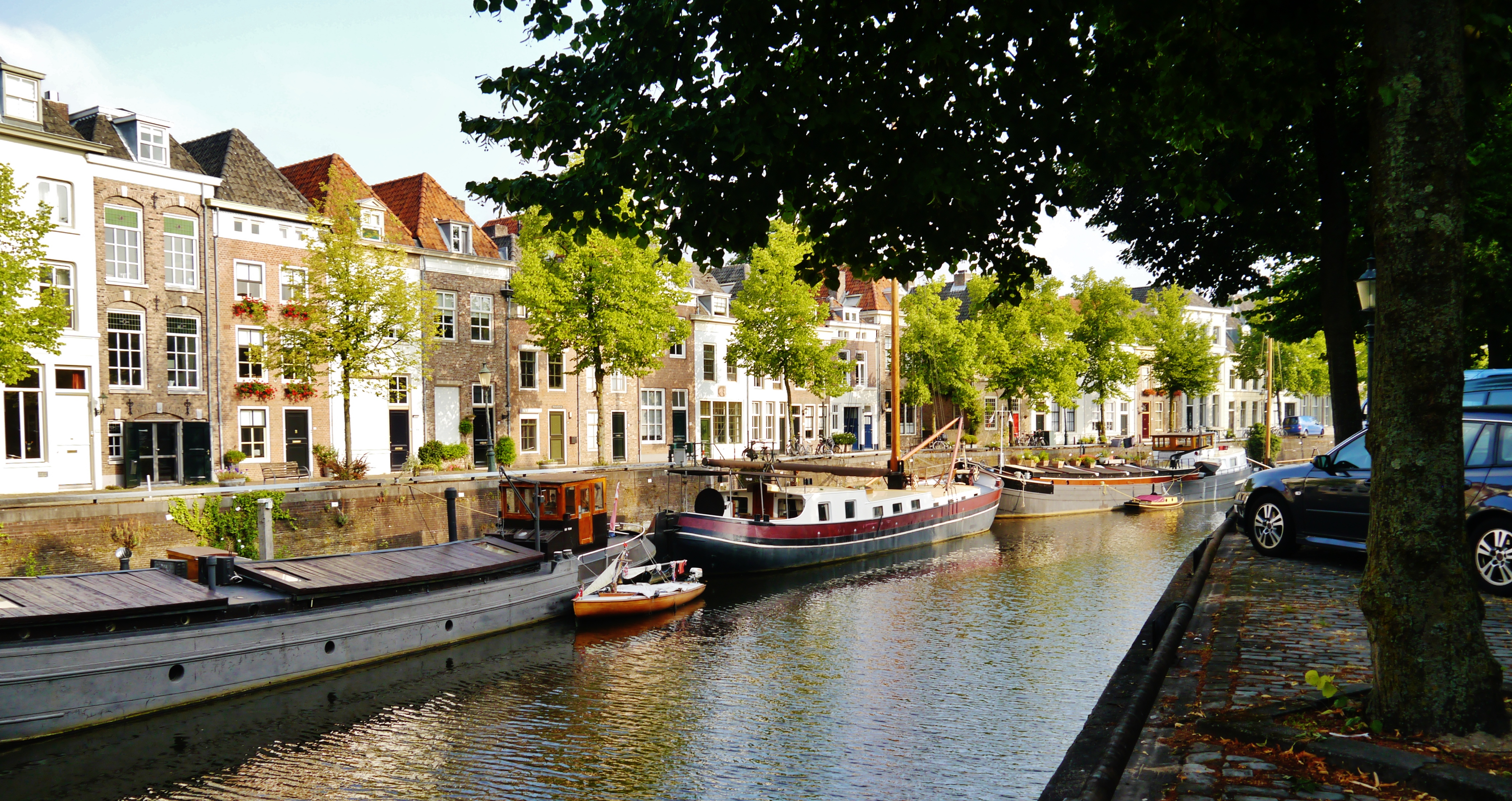
Binnenhaven to the north

The current Binnenhaven (inner harbor) is roughly situated between the (hidden) bridge in the Visstraat and the Boombrug at Oliemolensingel. The west quay is named Brede Haven and the east quay Smalle Haven. The northeast side, where the esplanade of the Citadel of 's-Hertogenbosch used to be, is known as Handelskade.

In the mid-thirteenth century the contemporary harbor of 's-Hertogenbosch, probably near Tolbrug, became inadequate. The city then dug through a sand ridge to make a connection between the Vughterstroom and the Groote Stroom. This connection is the part of the Groote Dieze that runs under the Zevensteensebrug in the Orthenstraat and was probably dug 1250-1275. It created part of the Smalle Haven (narrow harbor). The city then continued to dig a wide canal towards the south till the Korenbrugstraat. This created the Binnenhaven, even though it was not that wide yet. At the Korenbrugstraat a fish market was mentioned in the thirteenth century. At Lepelstraat there was space for small ships to turn. When the second city wall was built in the fourteenth century, the harbor came to lie within the city walls. A sluice was made in the wall to drain off the Vughterstroom.

In the fifteenth century, the Zwarte Water, which led from the Groote Stroom to the Meuse was replaced by a canal called Dieze. The Dieze was dug mostly along the bed of the Vughterstroom from 1441 to 1449, and therefore as an extension of the Binnenhaven. A water gate called 'Aan de Boom' was built to allow ships to pass the city walls between the harbor and the 'Dieze'. In the modern era the upper levels of the water gate were demolished. In the nineteenth century, the eastern tower was removed to facilitate shipping, and now only the base of the western tower remains.

The quay of the Brede Haven was also created by the fifteenth-century works. It is the only stretch of the city center of 's-Hertogenbosch that is reminiscent of the canals of cities in Holland, and this is no coincidence. On all other stretches of the Binnendieze, the (smaller) canals run through the backyards of the houses. In the Binnenhaven, and in the cities of Holland, the canals run in front of the houses. The same applies to the east quay of the Binnenhaven, named Smalle Haven. In the early 1630s part of the houses there were demolished, and a new quay built in order to increase the capacity of the harbor and to enable ships to use both sides of it. In the seventeenth and eighteenth centuries the members of the very important skippers guild, all Protestants, lived along the Breede Haven. They were interrelated, and controlled the shipping of 's-Hertogenbosch. In 1710 the town had more or less regular connections to cities in Holland and Zeeland, but also to Antwerp and Aachen.

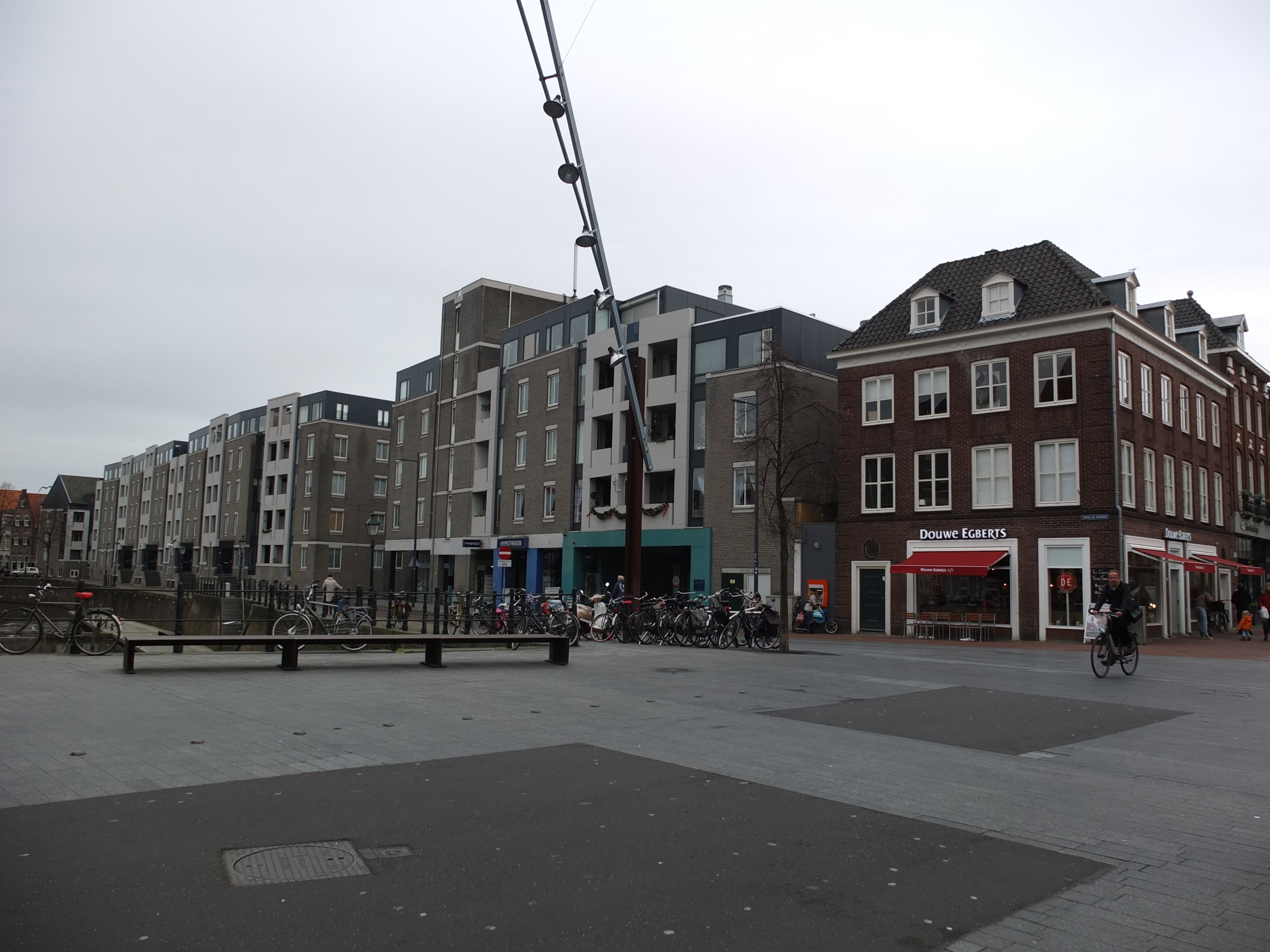
Smalle Haven to the north

The esplanade / Handelskade became available for construction after 1874. It attracted somewhat larger companies. The Houtman cigar factory was founded on the Handelskade in 1881. It quickly came to employ a little over a hundred cigar makers. These produced cigars of the brand La Paz, popular with King William III of the Netherlands. World War I put an end to the Houtman factory, but the brand 'La Paz' still exists. In 1922 Houtman's buildings on the Handelskade were bought by the transport company of Jos Beekwilder. Beekwilder used the buildings to expand as a warehousing company, so goods could be stored before or after transport. The buildings of the factory still exist, and give an idea of how much certain factories can look like any other building of the time.

The grocery chain De Gruyter would leave a permanent mark on the Binnenhaven. At one time it was the biggest grocery chain of the Netherlands. It only sold groceries of its own brand, and had three factories in 's-Hertogenbosch to produce these. The biggest factory was situated on the Binnenhaven. In the 1960s De Gruyter was too slow in adapting to the new supermarket concept, and was eliminated by the competition. In 1976 the last stores were closed.

The grocery chain left recognizable blue-tiled shop facades all over the Netherlands. The massive 5 story high factory building on the Binnenhaven, commonly known as 'The Yellow Danger', was demolished. It was replaced by a large complex of cheap, but less dominant, social housing. It has led to an extremely unappealing facade of the Smalle Haven. However, its uniform style does allow visitors to get an impression of the sheer size of the former factory.

== The debate for conservation ==
After the Binnendieze lost its defensive and transport functions, it became something like an open sewer in the nineteenth and early twentieth century. Later alternative waste disposal techniques became available, e.g. very wide sewer pipes that were laid at the bottom of the streams. In the 1920s the Doode Stroom was the first part of the Binnendieze that was filled up after a concrete sewer pipe had been installed. There was some regret, but there were no protests, because public health benefited. Nevertheless, even before World War II the possibilities for tourism were somewhat understood, and in the mid 1930s the first boat trips for tourists were organized.

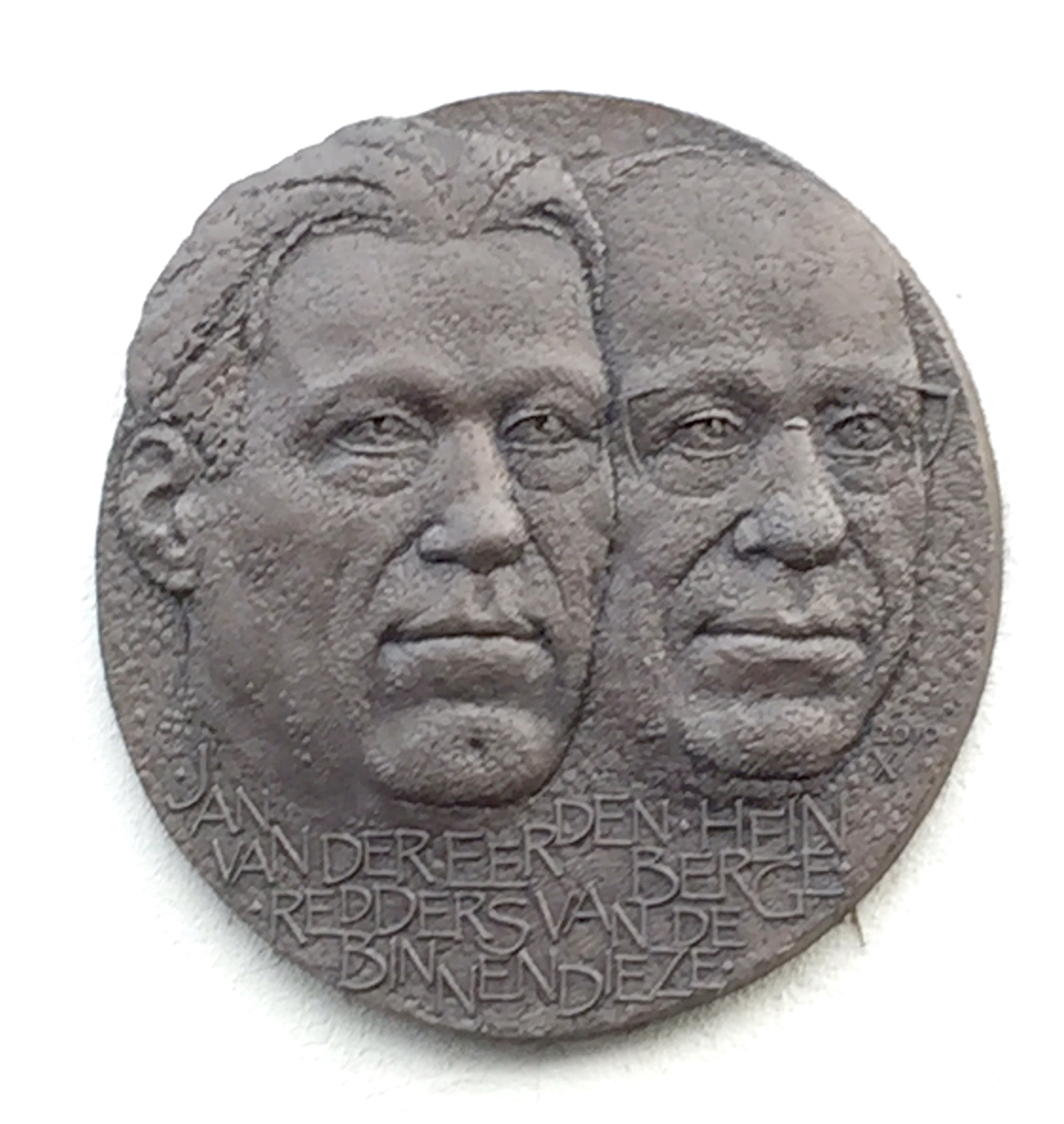
Plaquette in memory of Bergé and Van der Eerden

The real threat for the Binnendieze would come from the growth of automobile traffic after World War II. In 's-Hertogenbosch it led to the Marktroom and old city moat getting filled up without much protest in 1962. Then, while the national government was busy making a list of monuments to protect the national heritage, the corporation was secretly preparing Structure plan 1964. This plan entailed motorways that cut off corners of the city center, and 'breakthrough's'. All in all about 25% of all buildings in the center would be destroyed, the Binnenhaven would be filled up, and nothing much would be left of the Binnendieze. It was presented only 6 days before it would be treated in the municipal council. Structure plan 1964 led to a storm of protest from locals, united in the Comité Behoud Binnenstad (Committee to preserve the inner city), but also from many national organizations. The plan survived the vote, but this was only the start of the struggle.

During the first years the local protest movement did not have any real power. This changed in September 1966, when Hein Bergé and Jan van der Eerden got elected to the municipal council for the new party Beter Bestuur (better government). Bergé and Van der Eerden struggled for the preservation of the city center, and in particular for preserving the Binnendieze. Almost immediately after getting elected they asked for a report that had been made about the Binnendieze. It took the municipal government 23 months to deliver this report to the council. Later it was found that the existing report had been suppressed and a new report had been made. The new report combined the future of the Binnendieze and the construction of a sewer system, which the city center did not have yet. The report advised that the cheapest way to realize the sewer system was to use the Binnendieze as a location and then to fill it up. It would also create room for roads, and parking space. Only a segment of the Vughterstroom and two small fragments of the Groote Stroom would remain.

In January 1969 the fate of the Binnendieze would be decided in a meeting of the municipal council. Meanwhile the Rijksdienst voor Monumentenzorg (national heritage service), informed by Beter Bestuur had a different opinion. On the third day of the debate, a sketch arrived from The Hague, designating large parts of the Binnendieze as protected cityscape. Despite heavy opposition the plan survived the debate with a big majority. However, actually executing it had become very difficult because of the intervention from The Hague. On 21 December 1972 the government issued a decree that protected the inner city of 's-Hertogenbosch. By then the corporation, under the new mayor G. van de Ven had already changed course.

== Gallery ==
=== Binnendieze (Inner Dieze) ===
Groote Stroom

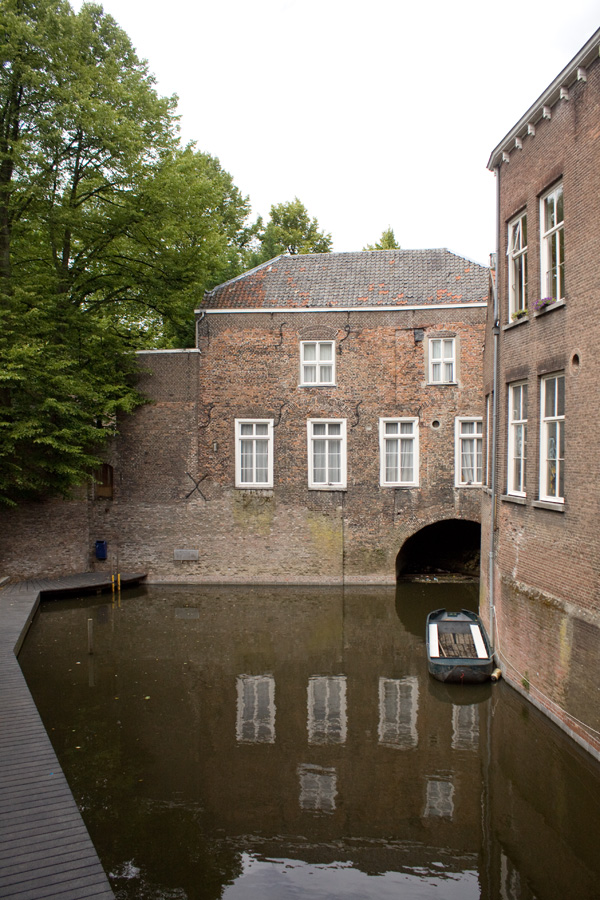

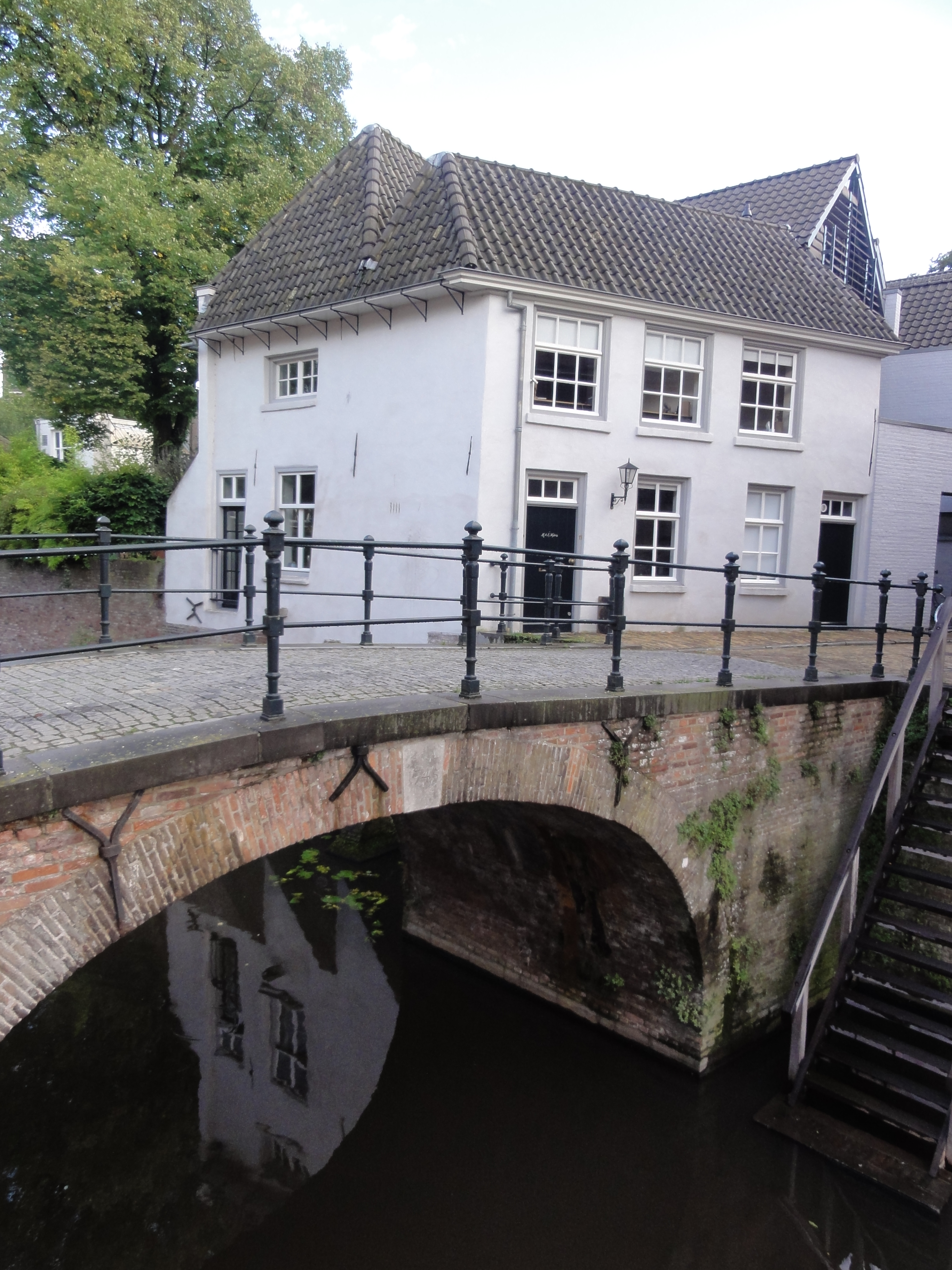

Verwerstroom

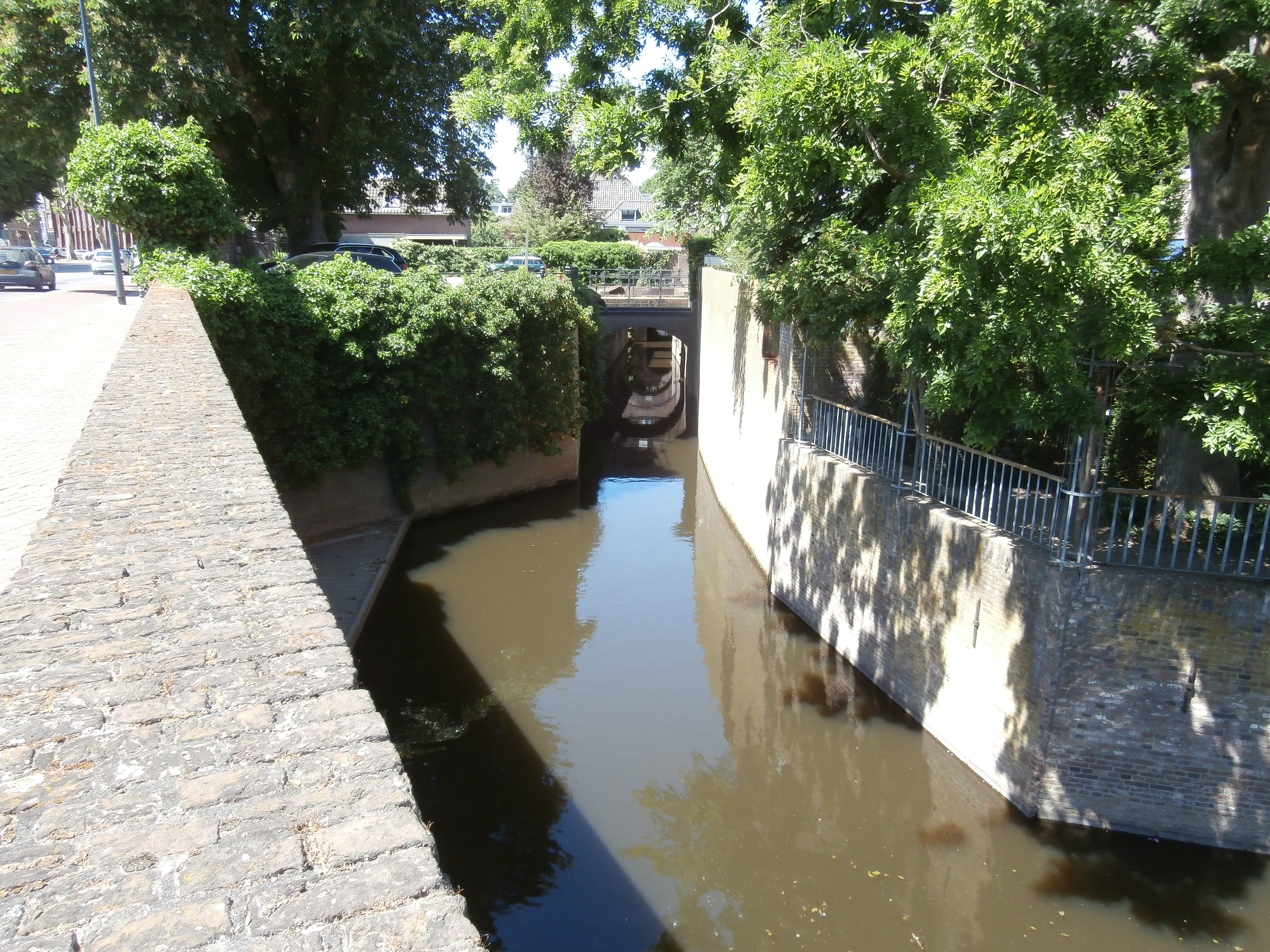

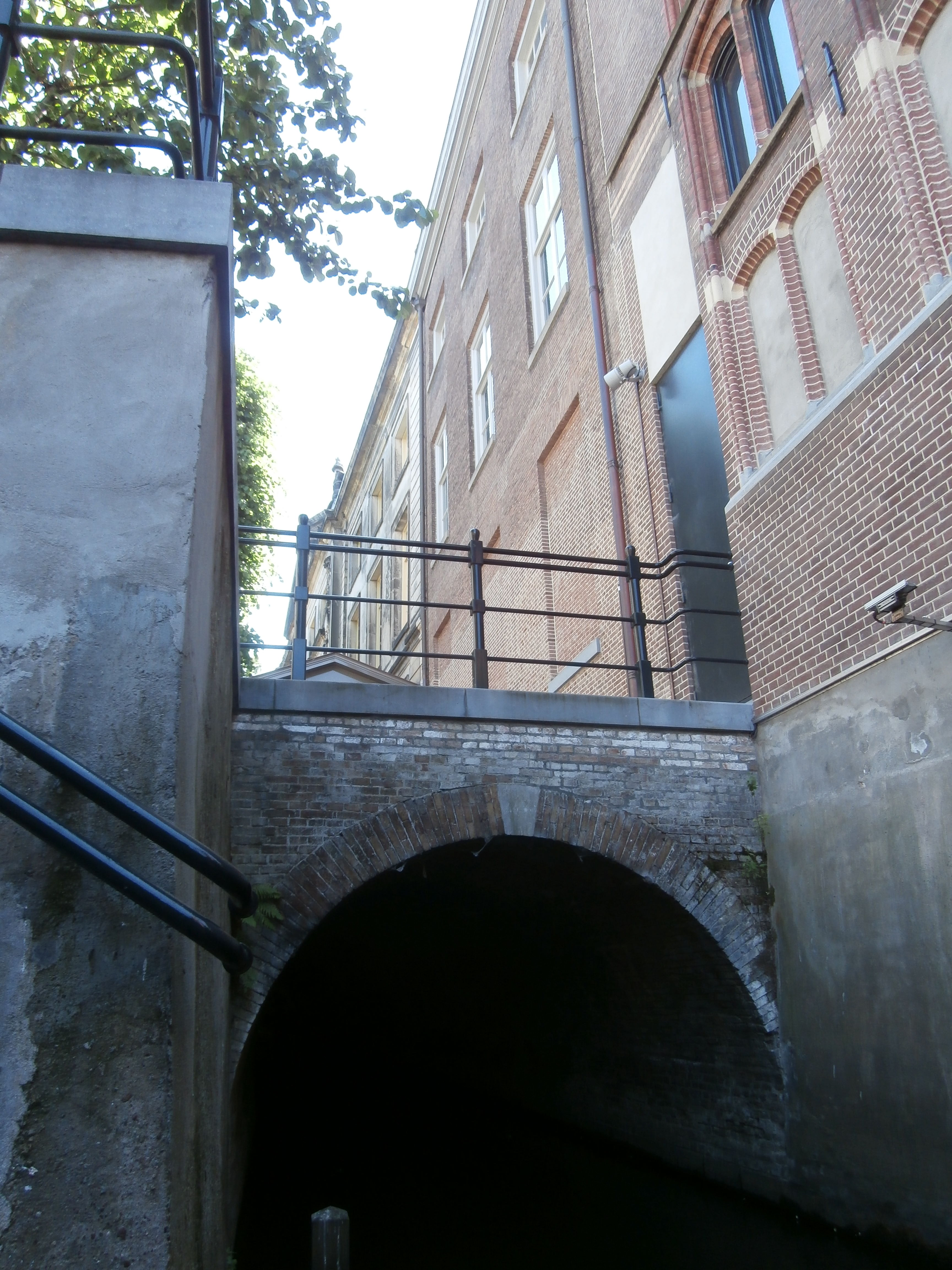

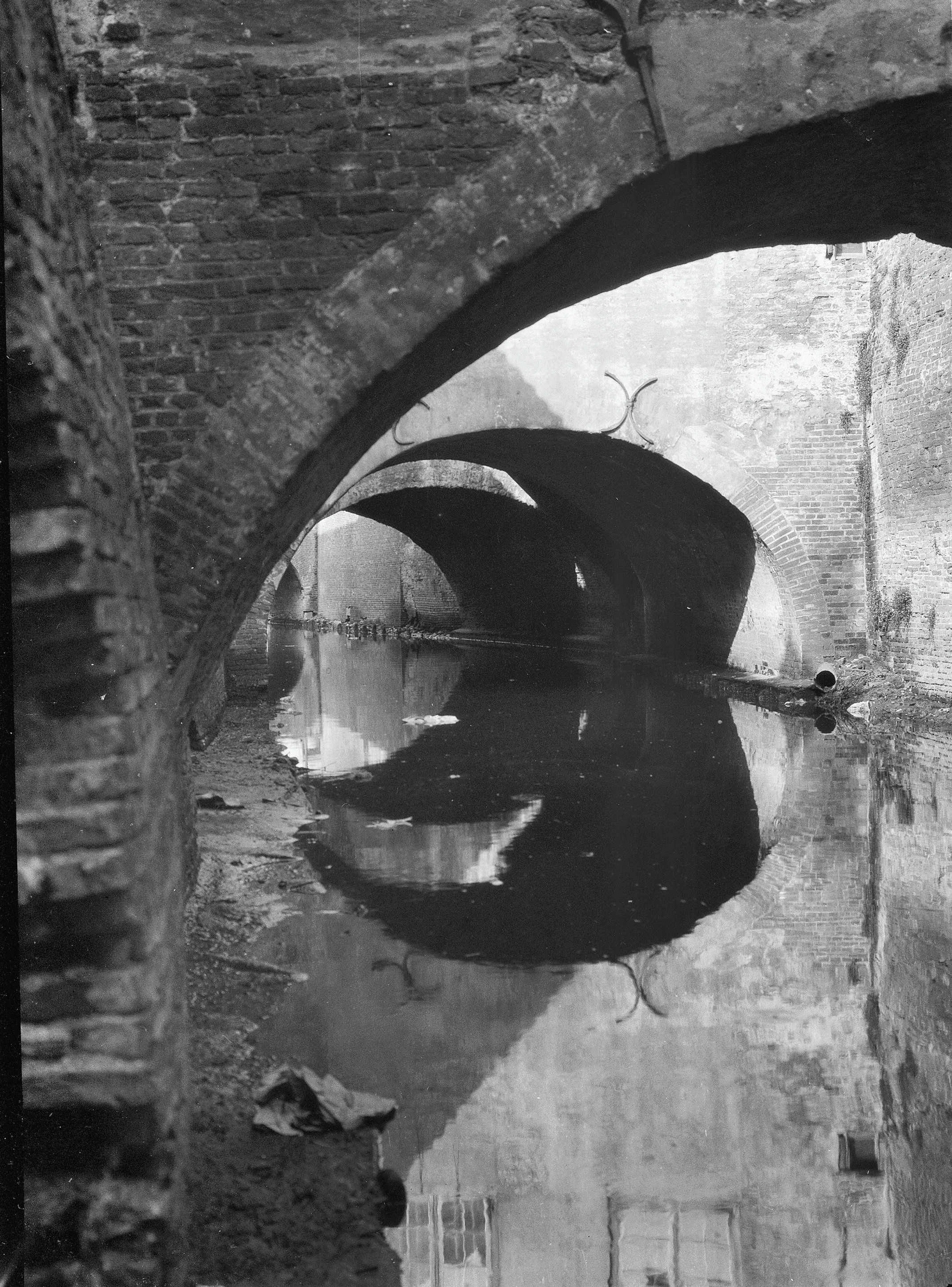

Vughterstroom

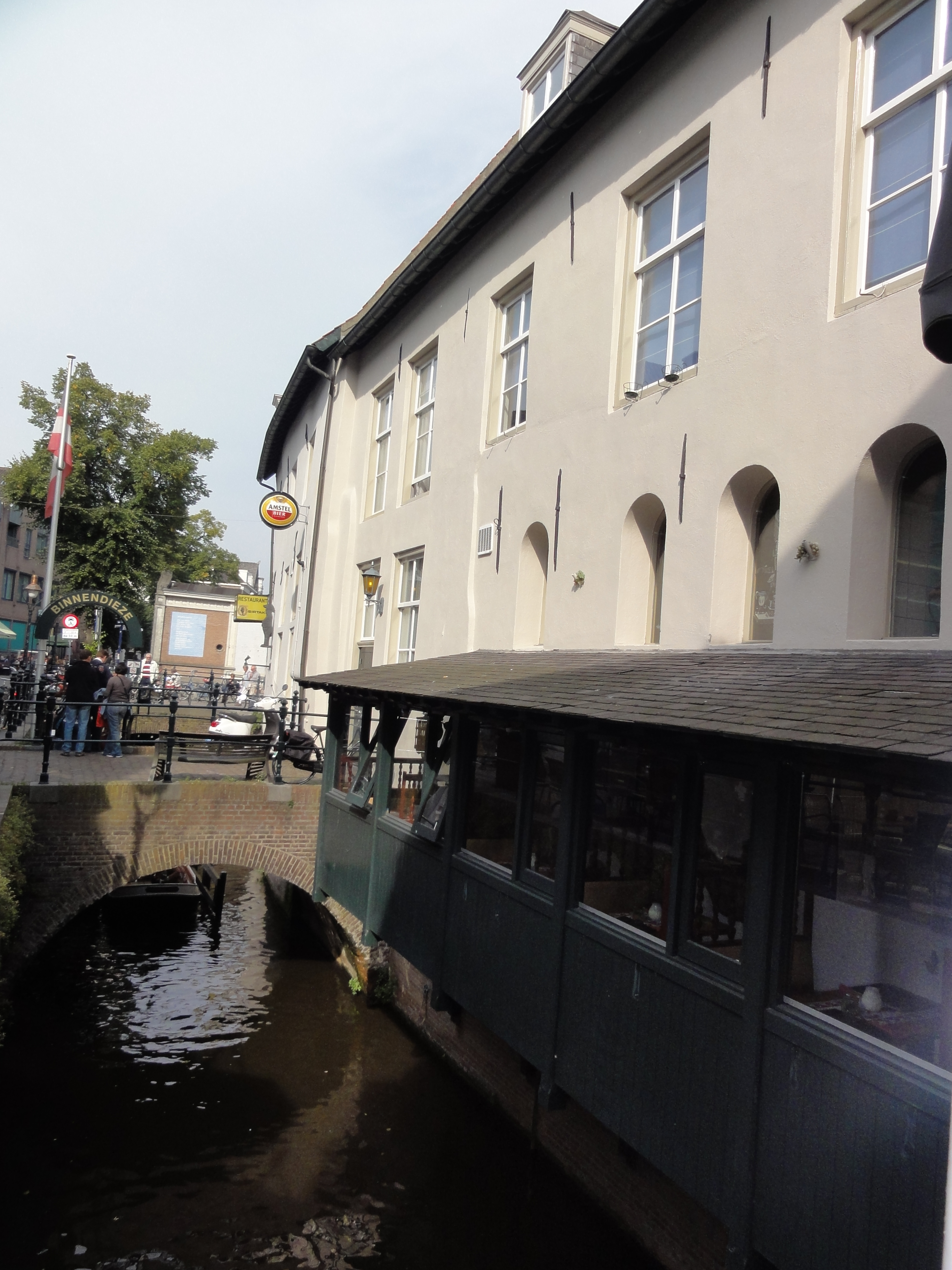
Corner Molenstraat Korenbrugstraat

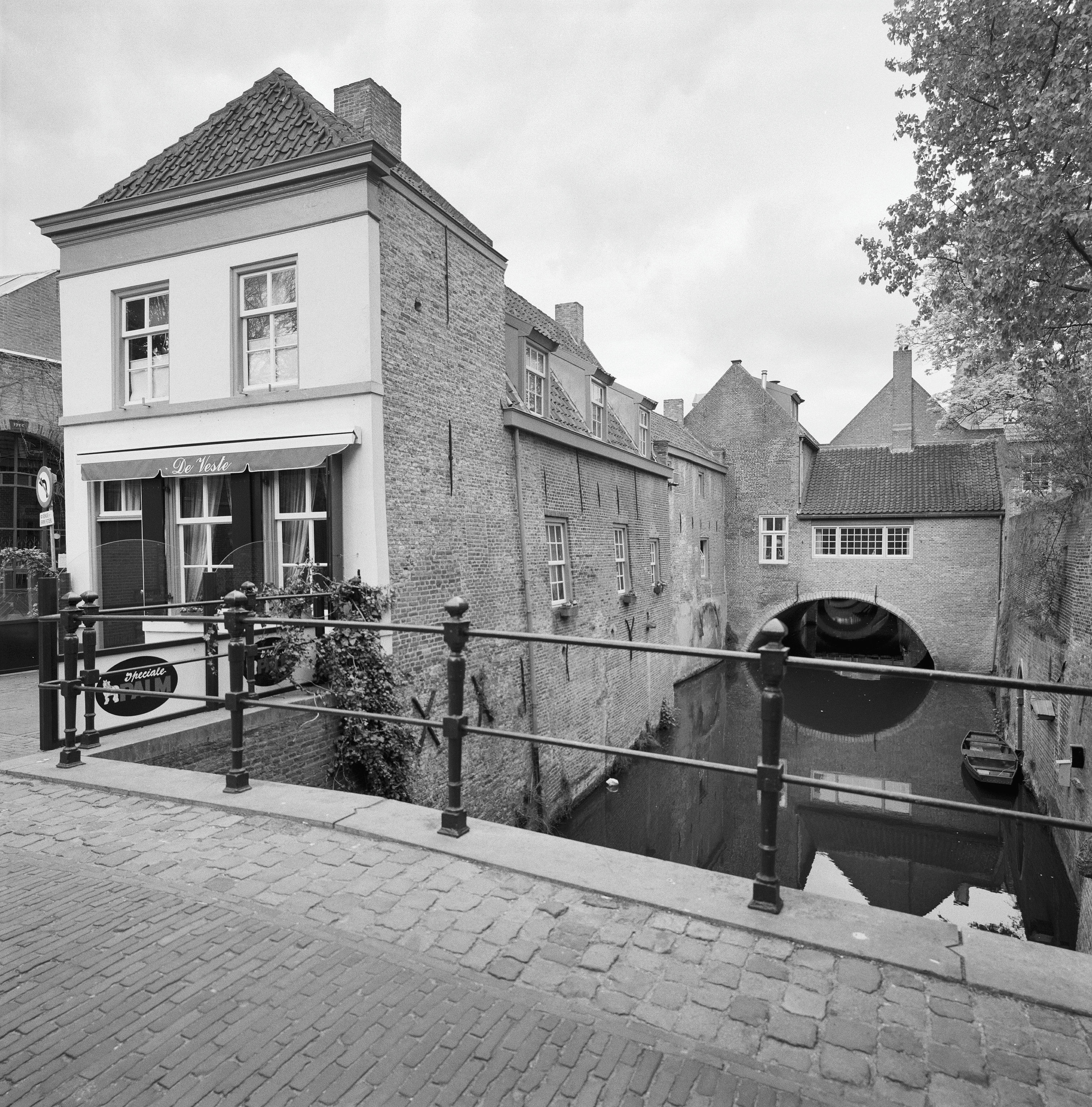
Uilenburg 8

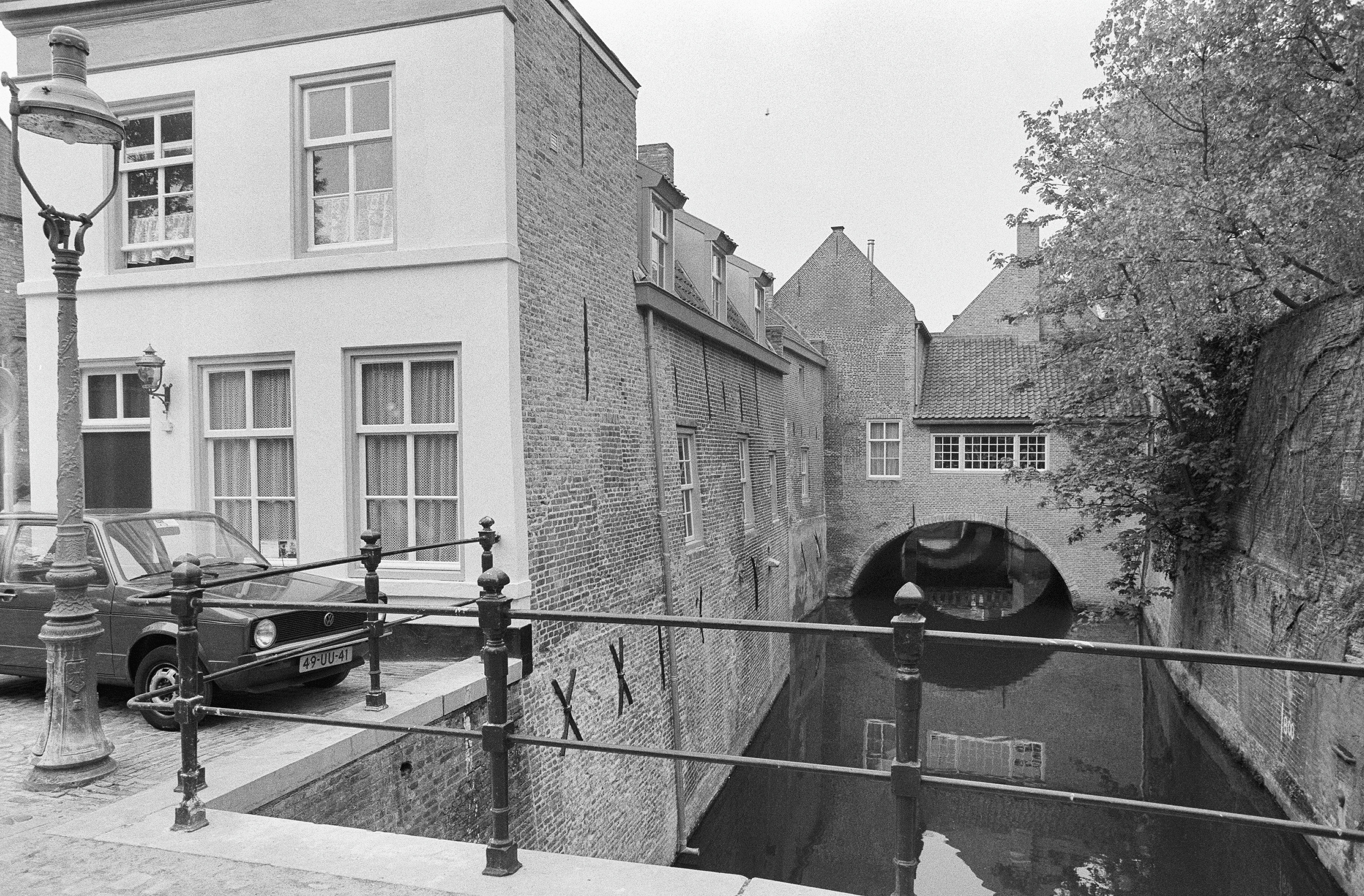
Uilenburg 8

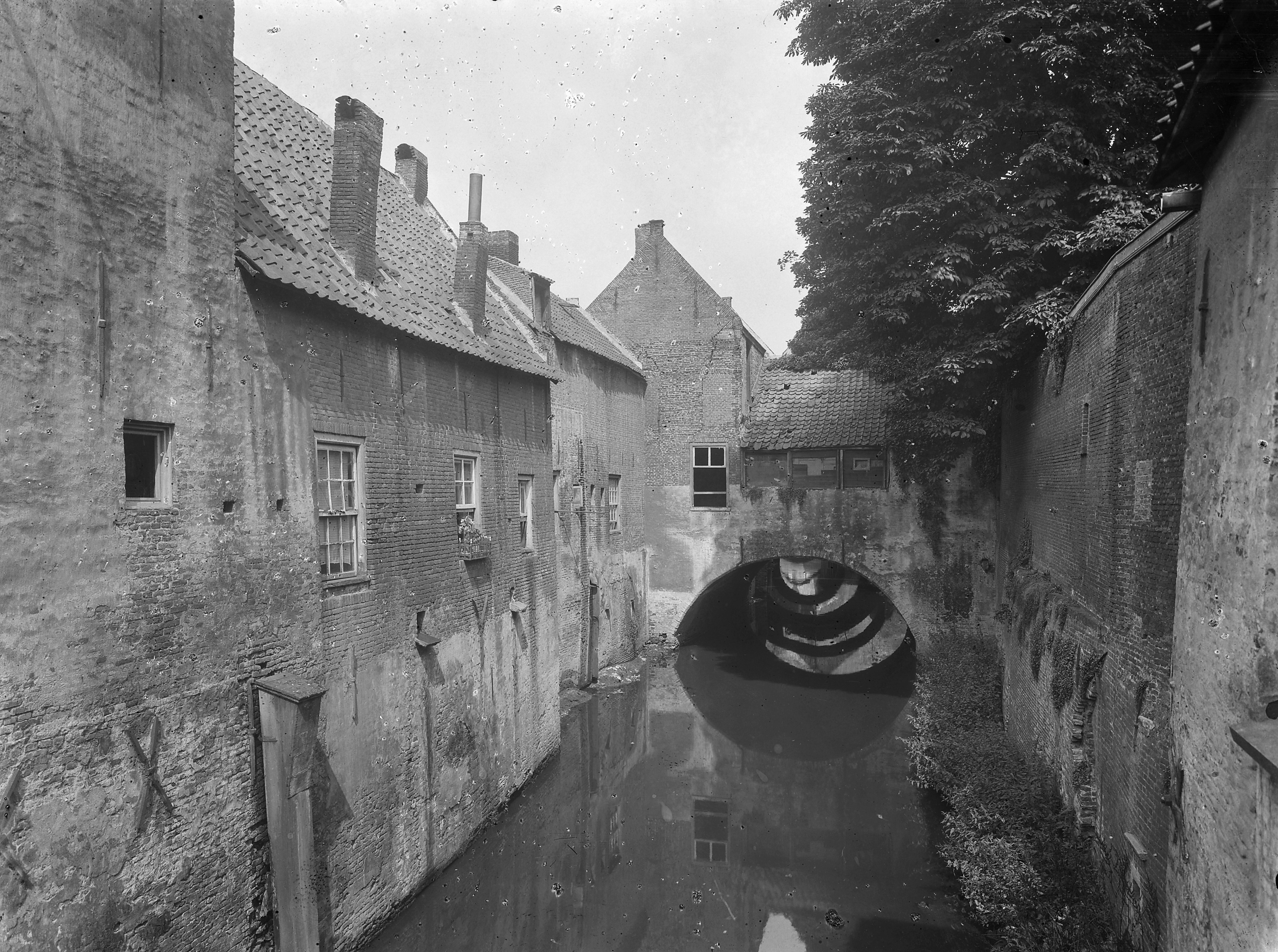
Uilenburg 8

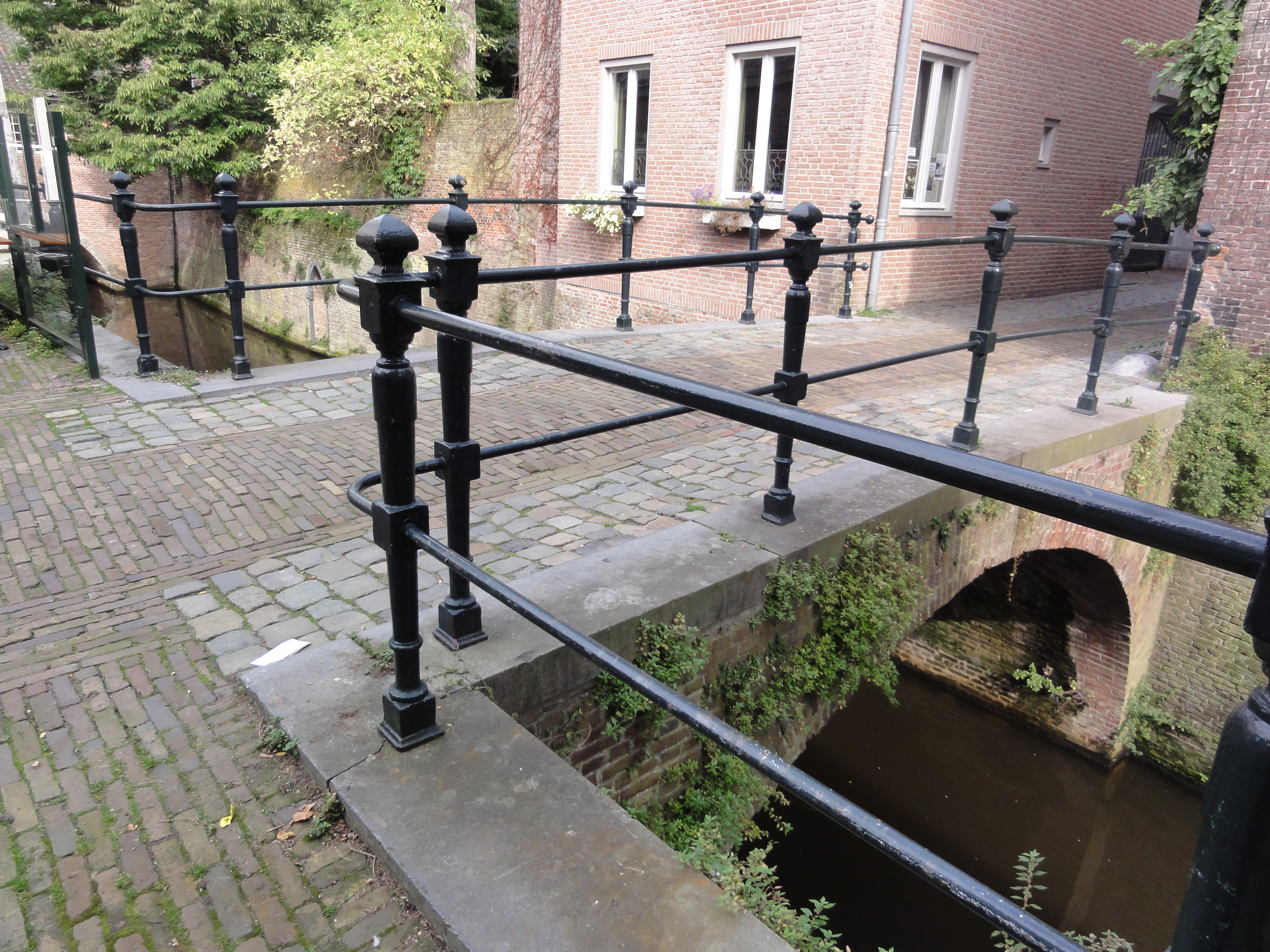
Uilenburg bridge between 10 and 13

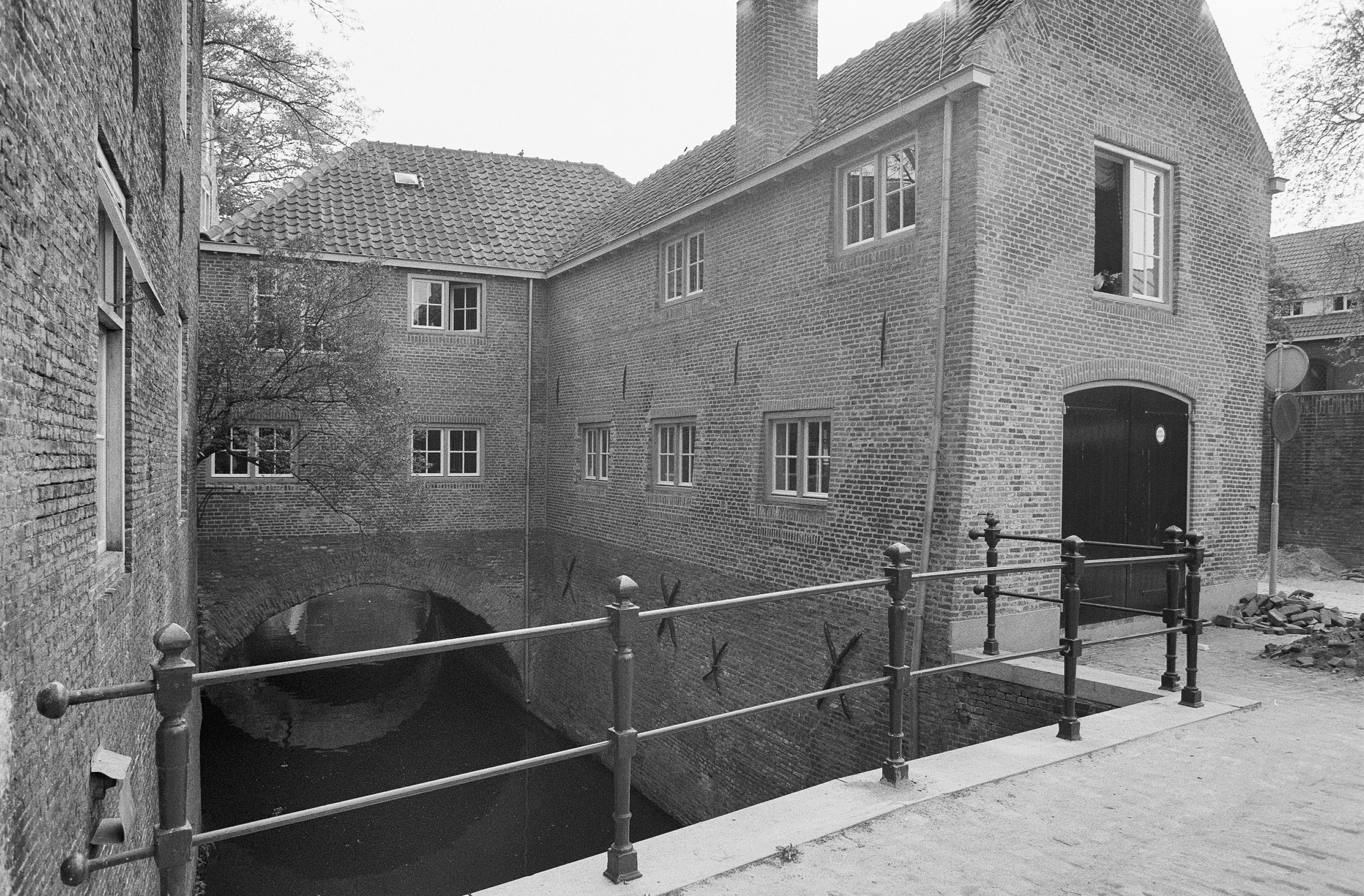
Uilenburg 10-14
