= St. Catherine's Church, 's-Hertogenbosch =

Church in The Netherlands

St. Catherine's Church
- Sint Cathrien
- Sint Catharinakerk
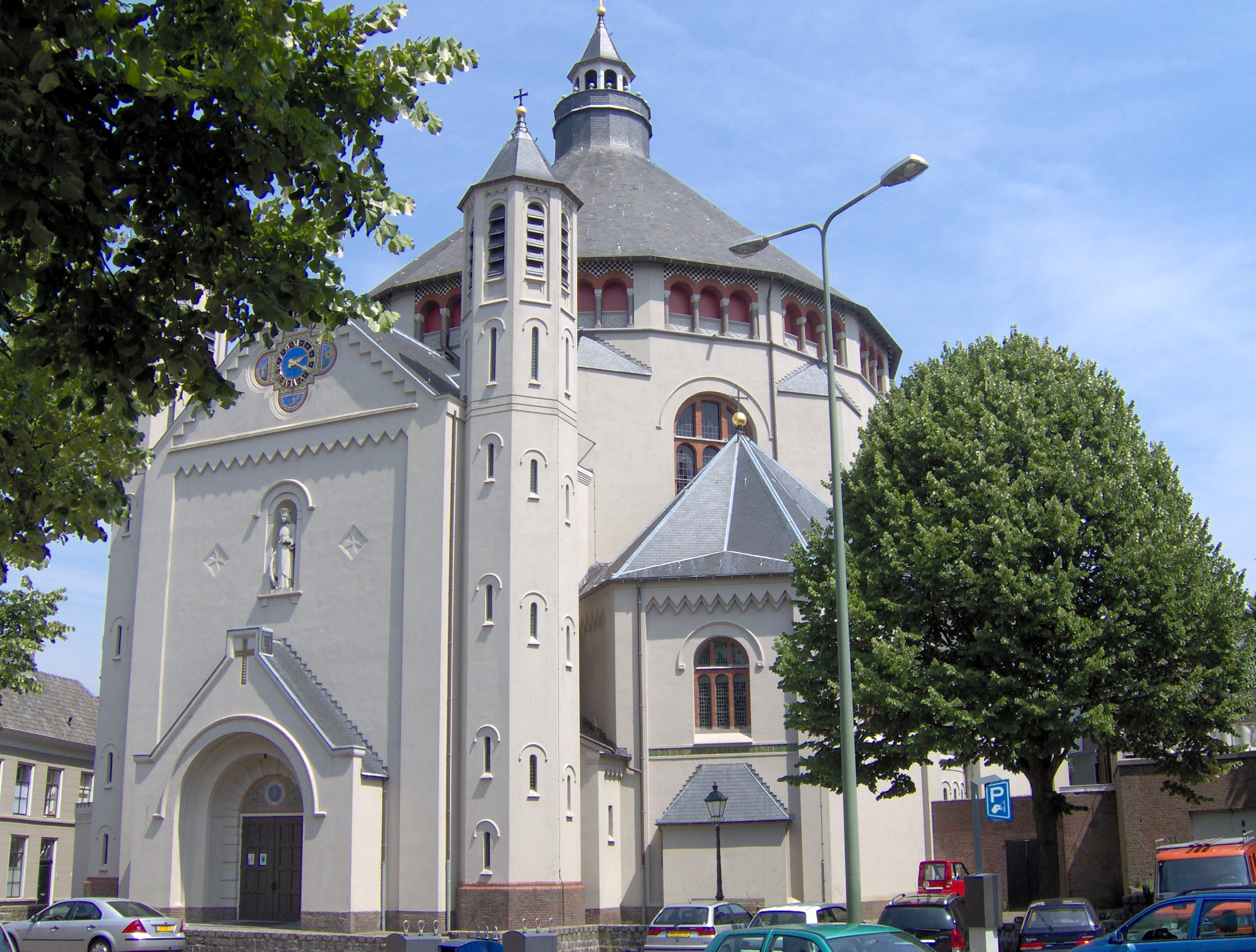
- St. Catherine's Church

- North Brabant
- 51.685766°N 5.299849°E
- Location: 's-Hertogenbosch
- Country: Netherlands
- Denomination: Eastern Orthodox
- Previous denomination: Catholic
- Website: https://www.byzantijnsekapel.nl/

History
- Dedication: = Catherine of Alexandria

Architecture
- Heritage designation: Rijksmonument
- Architect(s): Jan Stuyt (1917); Jos de Kroon (1842)
- Architectural type: Neo-Byzantine 1917
- Years built: 1533 Gothic choir, 1842 'Waterstaatskerk', 1917 Neo-Byzantine

St. Catherine's Church, in Dutch Sint-Catharinakerk was previously named Cross Church, Kruiskerk or Kruisherenkerk and is located at the Kruisbroedershof.

== History ==
=== The Gothic Church ===
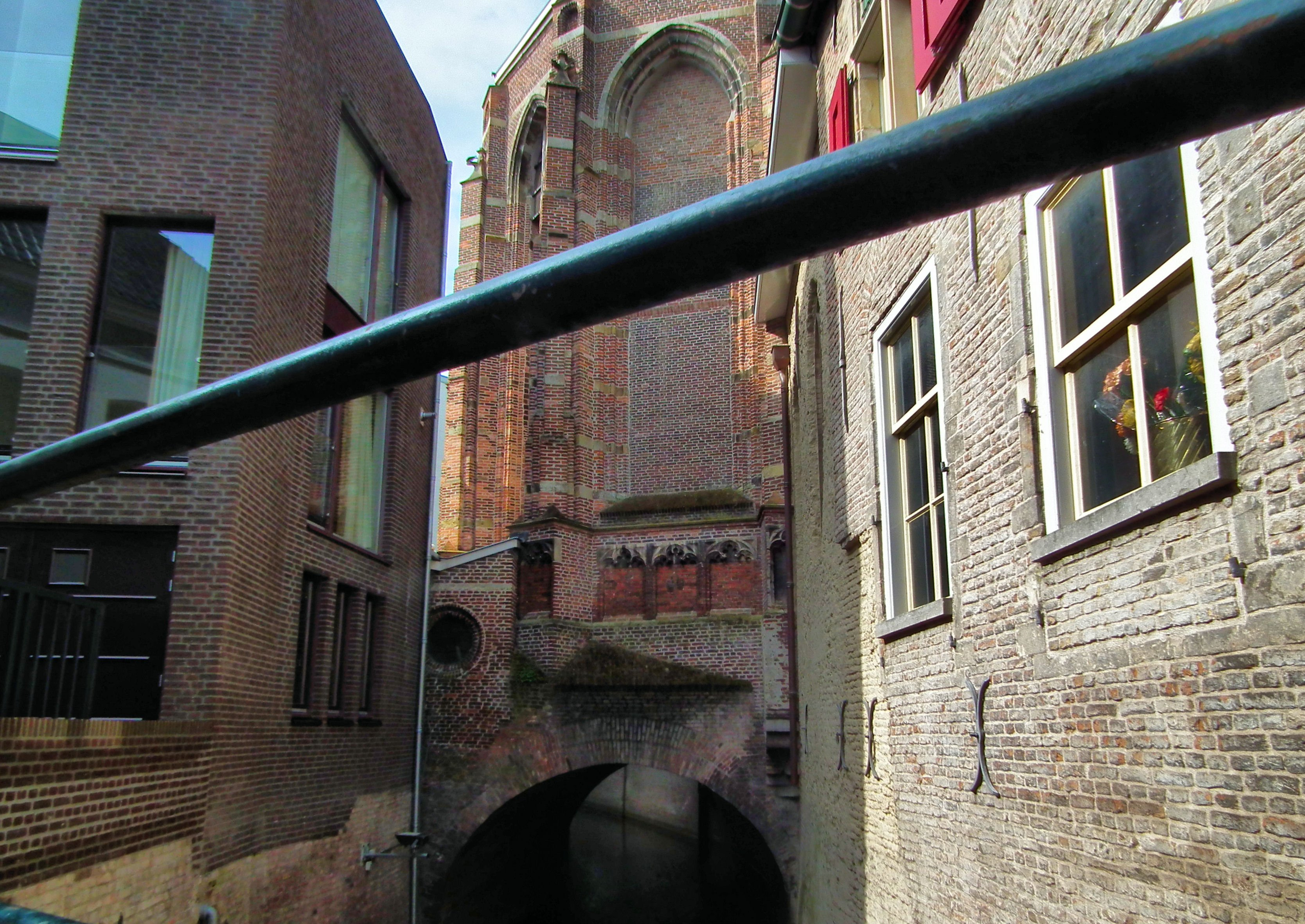
Choir over the Kerkstroom

In 1486 the first members of the religious order of the Crosiers, Kruisheren settled in 's-Hertogenbosch. This is a male order that focuses on education and evangelization. In 1533 they built their convent church in 's-Hertogenbosch. When the city was divided into four parishes in 1569, their church also became a parish church. The church was expanded in 1601, an operation that probably lasted till 1609.

The church suffered heavy damage during the 1629 Siege of 's-Hertogenbosch. In 1631 the choir was repaired. When the old St Peter's was demolished in 1645/46 the debris was bought by the municipality. In 1648 it used the good parts to restore St. Catharine's. In 1650 the Protestant citizens of the city took over the church after they had left the Old St. James Church. In 1703 the tower was destroyed by a storm.

After the 1794 Siege of 's-Hertogenbosch, the Protestants had to leave the church. It was occupied by the French army, which made it a bakery, and storage for hay, and a stable. In 1810 Napoleon Bonaparte made the church available to serve the French garrison. The parish was only allowed to return to the church in 1811.

=== Waterstaat Church ===
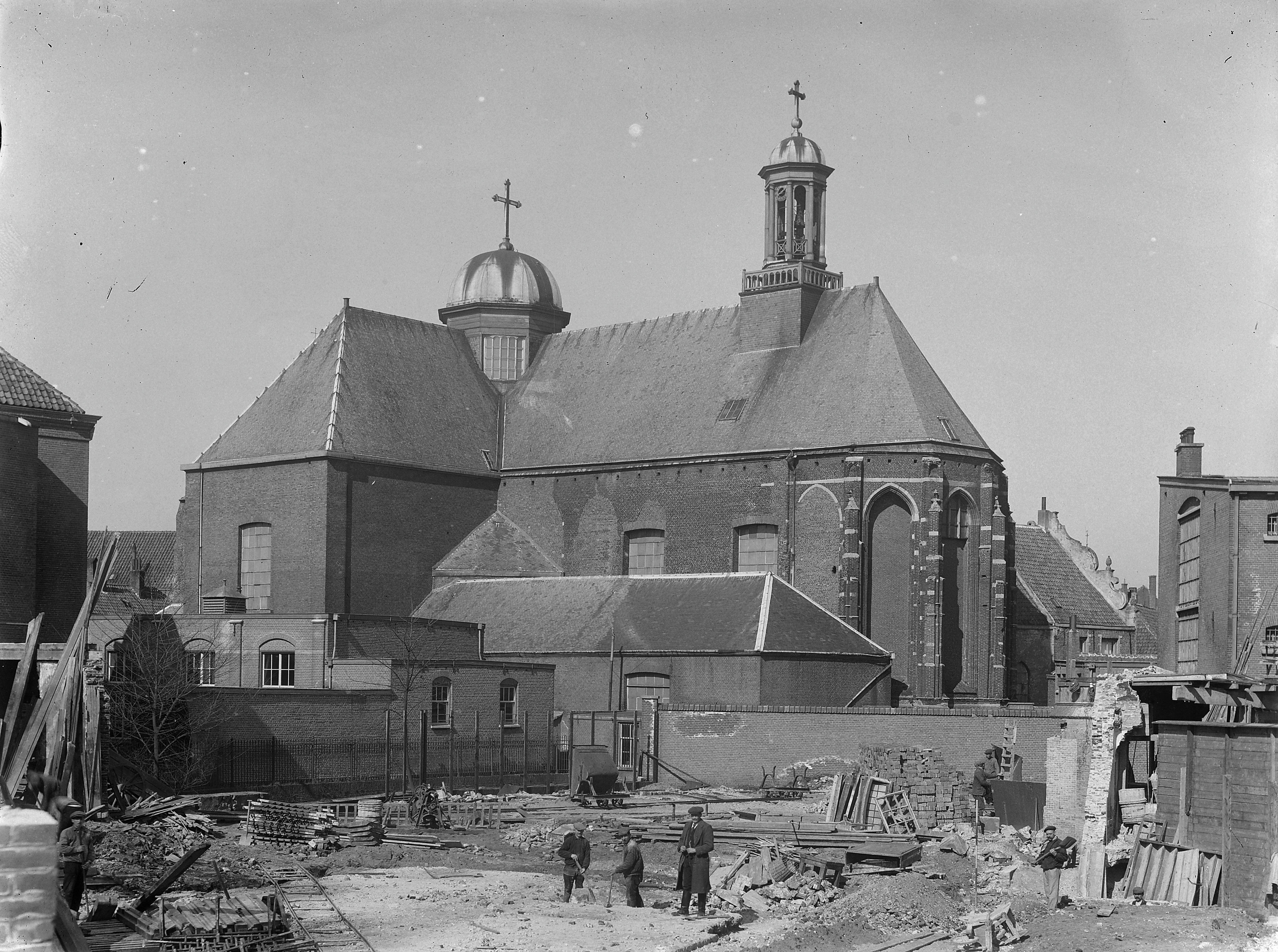
The Waterstaat Church

In the mid nineteenth century the Dutch government agency Rijkswaterstaat was tasked with paying for, managing and overseeing the construction of a long list of churches. These were to replace a church that a religious denomination had lost to another denomination, or to compensate for it. It led to the phenomenon of the Waterstaatskerk. The new St. Catherine's that was constructed in the 1840s, was such a church.

By the 1840s the church was heavily damaged and partly ruinous. The paintings by Pieter-Jozef Verhaghen, which came from Averbode Abbey had been stored elsewhere.

In 1841 the foundations for a new church were laid after some expropriations. In 1842-1843 the church was completed for about 50,000 guilders. The only part of the Gothic church that remained was the choir, which had been constructed over the Kerkstroom, a part of the Binnendieze. In 1872 a school for boys was added to the church.

=== The current Neo-Byzantine Church ===
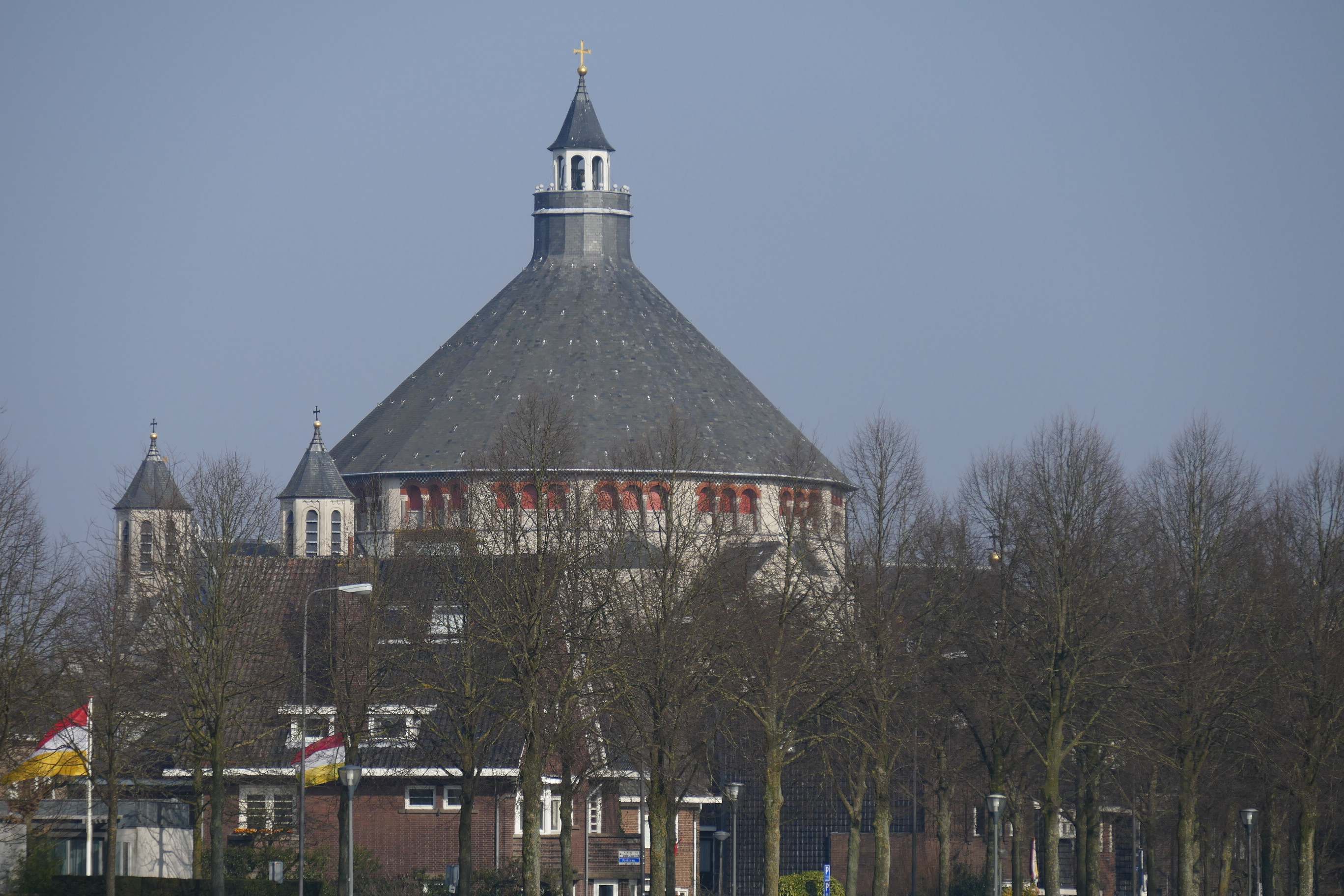
The Dome in 2015

Like many other Waterstaat Churches the construction of St. Catherine's proved to be not that durable. Architect Jan Stuyt would draw inspiration from a trip to Istanbul, where he had seen the Hagia Sophia. The design would resemble Stuyt's Cenakelkerk in Heilig Landstichting. He re-used the existing foundations of the Waterstaat church, and left the old choir intact.

Stuyt then designed a domed church, which had an octagonal structure which supported a sixteen sided dome of reinforced concrete. One of the first such constructions in the Netherlands. It has a dwarf gallery on the outside. Two stair towers flank the western façade, in the center of which is a statue of St. Catharine. The first stone was laid in 1916, and in 1918 the church was finished. The outside was renovated in 1995-1997.

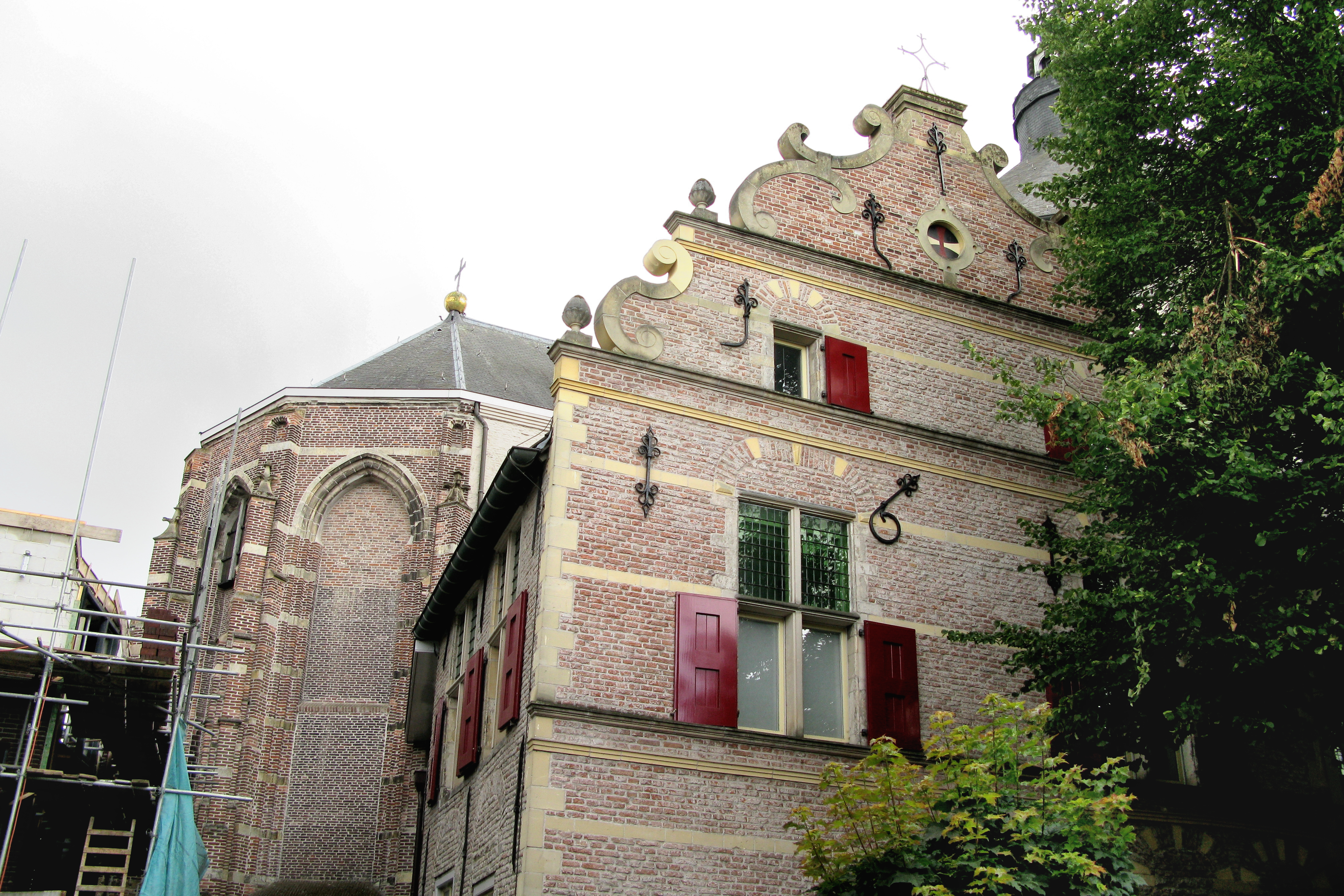
Façade of the parsonage

In the interior, the inside of the dome was painted by Jan Oosterman in 1919-1925. It represents the Beatitudes. The organ, built in 1849-1851 by J. and J.J. Vollebregt, was transferred to the new church in a somewhat different form. The oak pulpit dates from 1625, with a flight of stairs from 1846. The church has bells by Jan Moor (1562), Melchior Haze (16th century), Alexius and Petrus Petit (1759) and Henricus Petit (1791). Nine paintings by Pieter-Jozef Verhaghen belong to St. Catherine's.

=== The Parsonage ===
Shortly after the completion of the first parish church, a parsonage was completed in 1619. This is a part of the old church that still stands. Its mannerism façade with sandstone and chalk was restored in 1995-1997, and is reminiscent of a southern Netherlands style.

== 21st Century ==
=== Plans for a theater ===
In mid 2015 the Catholic Church left St. Catherine's. The building was then considered as a temporary location for the city's main theater, but the renovation of Theater aan de Parade was postponed.

=== Eastern Orthodox Church ===
In early 2019 the church was unexpectedly taken back into use. The John of Damascus community, which is a Dutch branch of the Eastern Orthodox Church had used the church since 1998, but had been forced to leave in 2015. In April 2019 the Armenian Church then took the church into use, and was joined by the John of Damascus community in August 2019.
