= 2024 New Year Honours (New Zealand) =

Awards list for New Zealand

- Previous: 2023 King's Birthday and Coronation Honours; Next: 2024 King's Birthday Honours
- Type: New Zealand royal honours: New Zealand Order of Merit; Queen's Service Order; Queen's Service Medal; New Zealand Antarctic Medal; New Zealand Distinguished Service Decoration
- Date: 30 December 2023
- Country: New Zealand
- Total recipients: 151

The 2024 New Year Honours in New Zealand were appointments by Charles III in his right as King of New Zealand, on the advice of the New Zealand government, to various orders and honours to reward and highlight good works by New Zealanders, and to celebrate the passing of 2023 and the beginning of 2024. They were announced on 30 December 2023.

The recipients of honours are listed here as they were styled before their new honour.

== New Zealand Order of Merit ==
=== Dame Companion (DNZM) ===
- Sarai-Paea Bareman – of Zürich, Switzerland. For services to football governance.
- Pania Tyson-Nathan MNZM JP – of Tītahi Bay. For services to Māori and business.
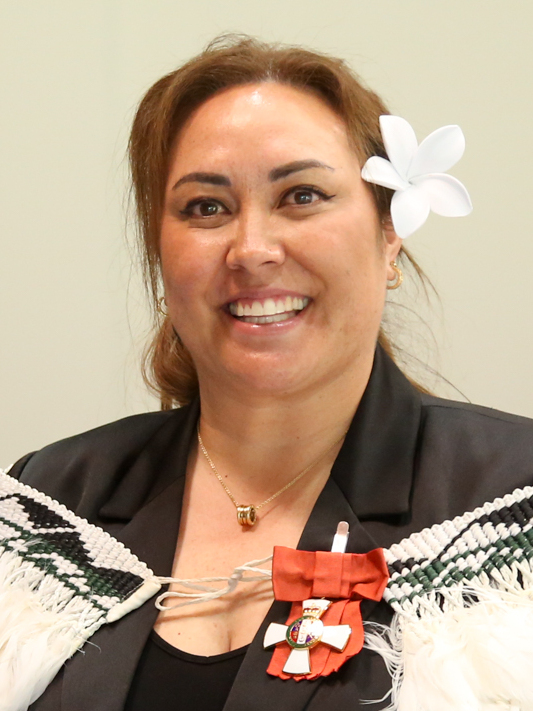
Dame Sarai Bareman

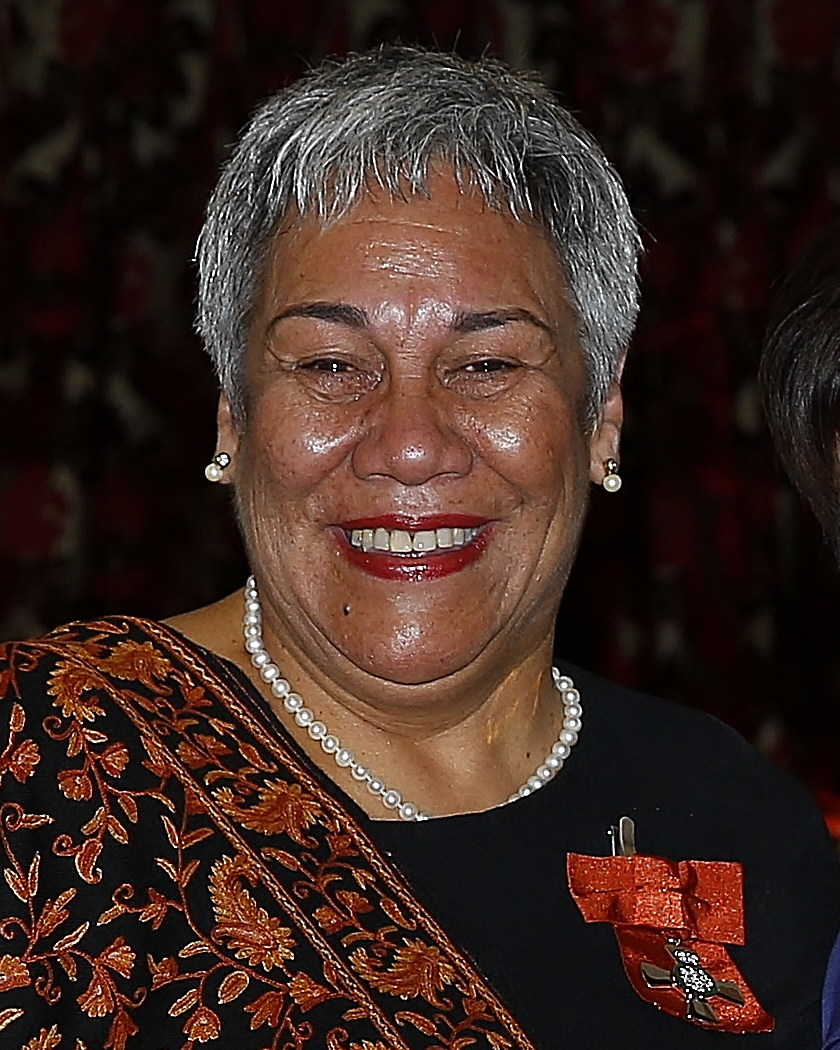
Dame Pania Tyson‑Nathan

=== Knight Companion (KNZM) ===
- Dr Scott Duncan Macfarlane – of Greenlane. For services to health.
- The Right Honourable Trevor Colin Mallard – of Dublin, Ireland. For services as a member of Parliament and as Speaker of the House of Representatives.
- Ian Barry Mune OBE – of Kumeū. For services to film, television and theatre.
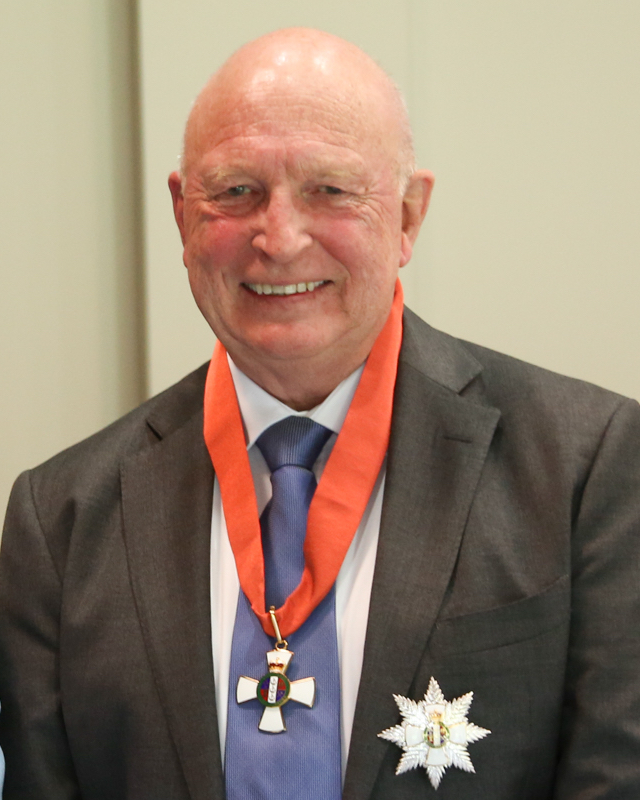
Sir Scott Macfarlane

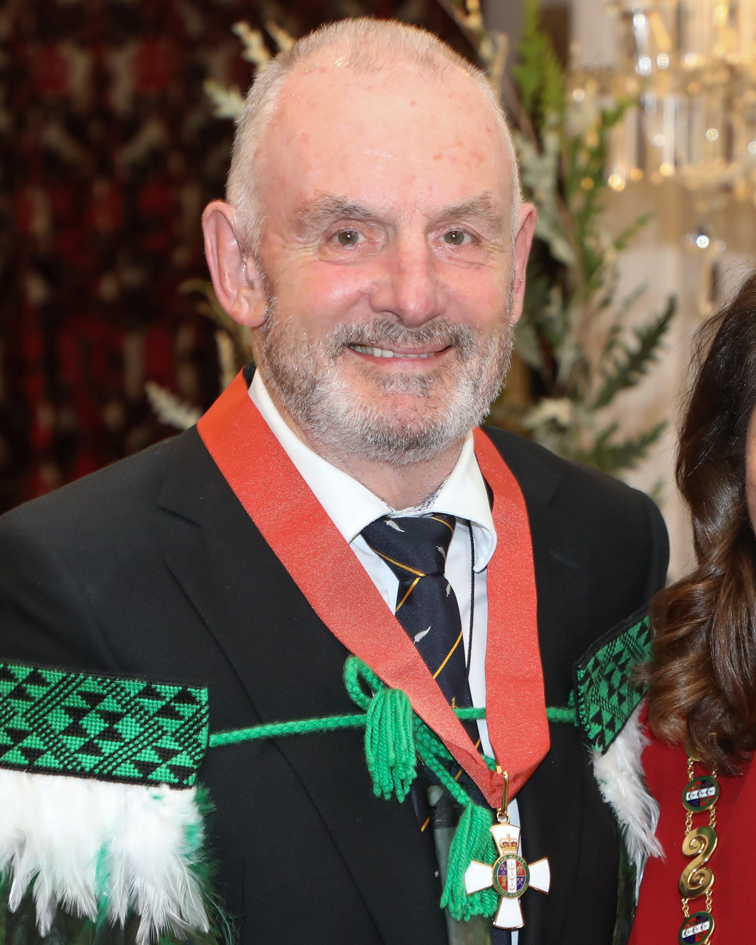
Sir Trevor Mallard

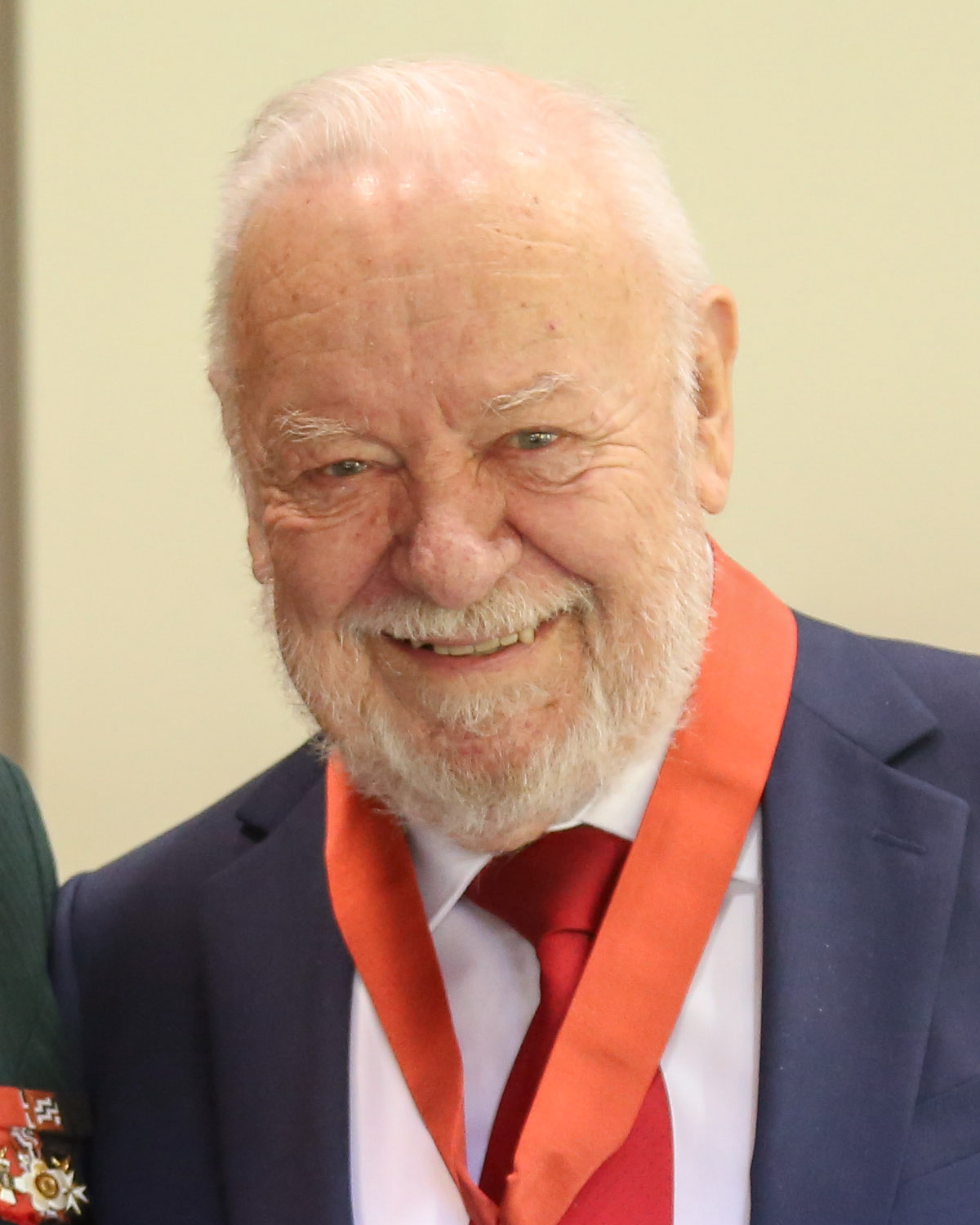
Sir Ian Mune

=== Companion (CNZM) ===
- Professor Brian Joseph Anderson – of Mount Eden. For services to paediatrics and anaesthesia.
- Dr Vanessa Shona Beavis – of Saint Heliers. For services to anaesthesia.
- David Kenrick Beeche – of Remuera. For services to sports administration.
- Professor Timothy Clinton Bell – of Shirley. For services to computer science education.
- John Donald Brakenridge – of Ohoka. For services to the New Zealand food and fibre sectors and the merino industry.
- Professor Graeme Mervyn Bydder – of Altrincham, United Kingdom. For services to medical imaging.
- Philip Maxwell Cheshire – of Freemans Bay. For services to architecture.
- Clive Ernest Fugill – of Pukehangi. For services to Māori art.
- Dale Mary Adeline Garratt – of Albany Heights. For services to Christian music production.
- David Reginald Garratt – of Albany Heights. For services to Christian music production.
- Clive David Hill MNZM – of Welbourn. For services to literature, particularly children’s literature.
- Yolanda Lou-Anne Wisewitch Soryl – of St Albans. For services to literacy education.
- Dr Kevin Edward Trenberth – of Rothesay Bay. For services to geophysics.
- Jo-anne Edna Mary Wilkinson (Lady Dingle) MNZM – of Rosedale. For services to youth.
- James Ross Wilson – of Mount Victoria. For services to the trade union movement and workplace safety.
- Dr Johanna Julene Wood – of Palmerston North. For services to football governance
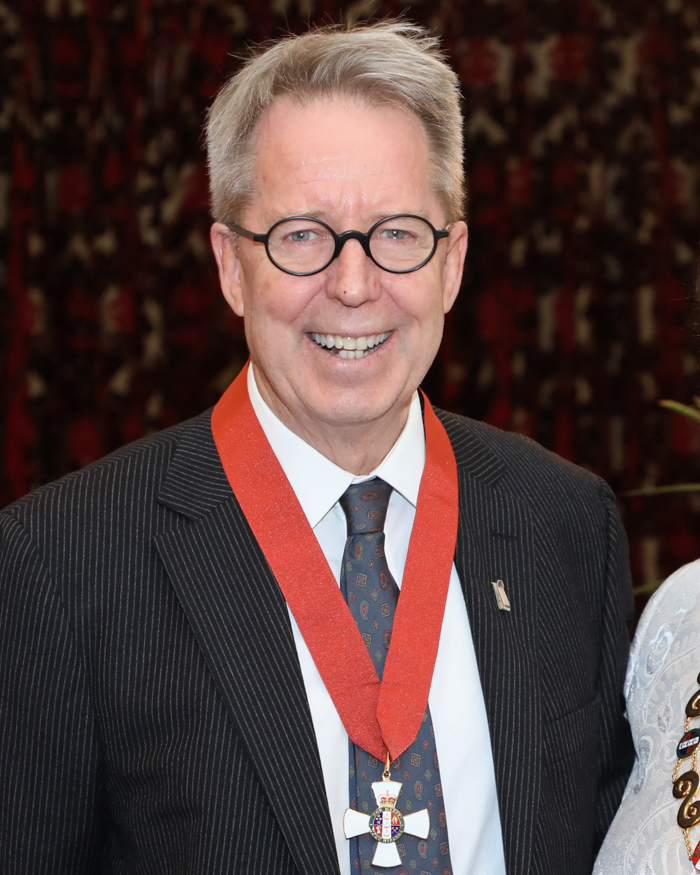
Brian Anderson

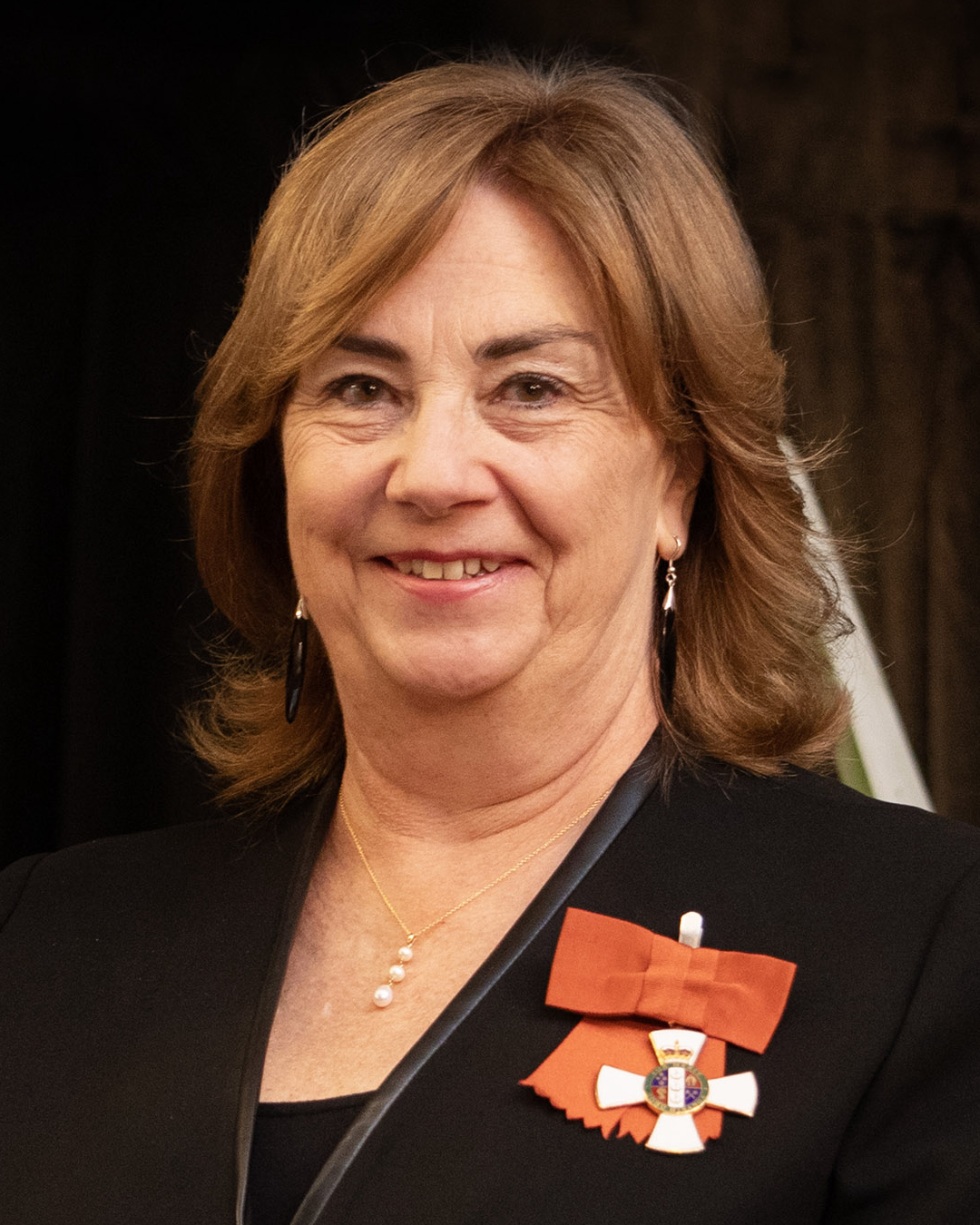
Vanessa Beavis

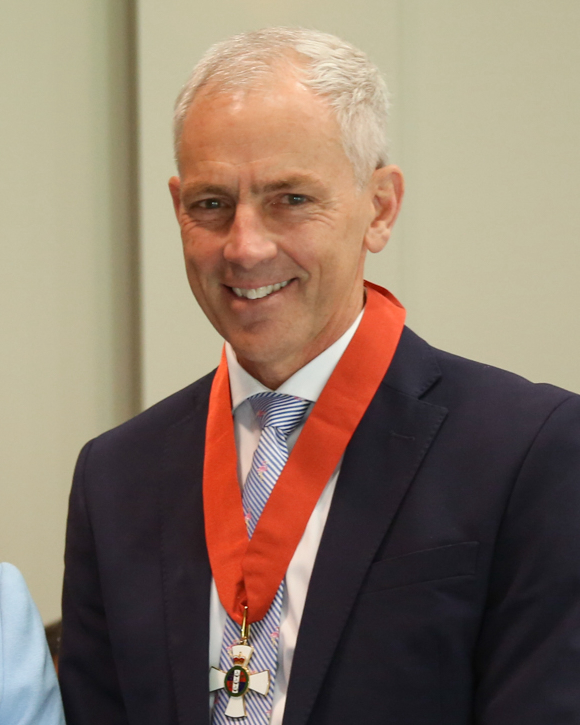
Dave Beeche

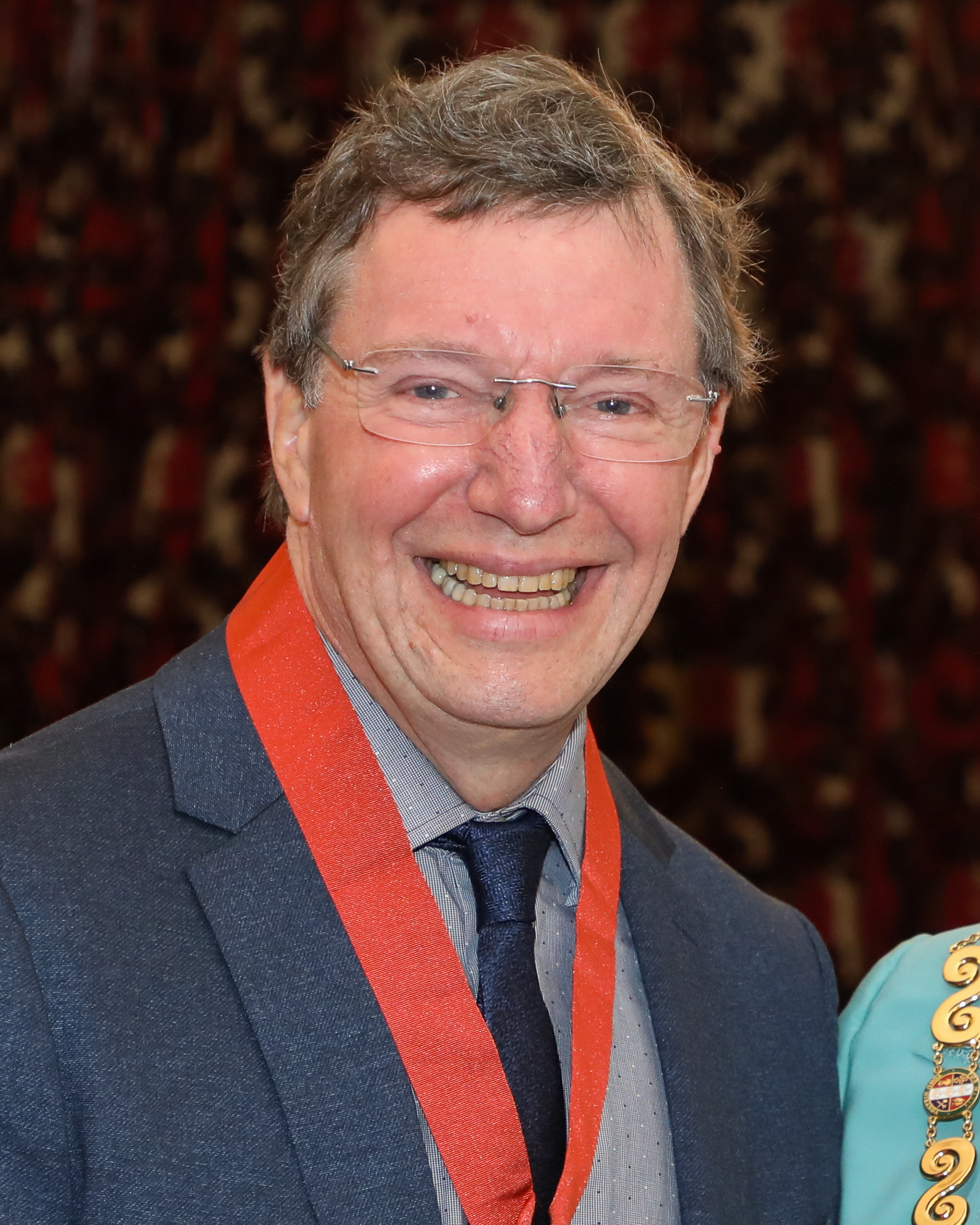
Tim Bell

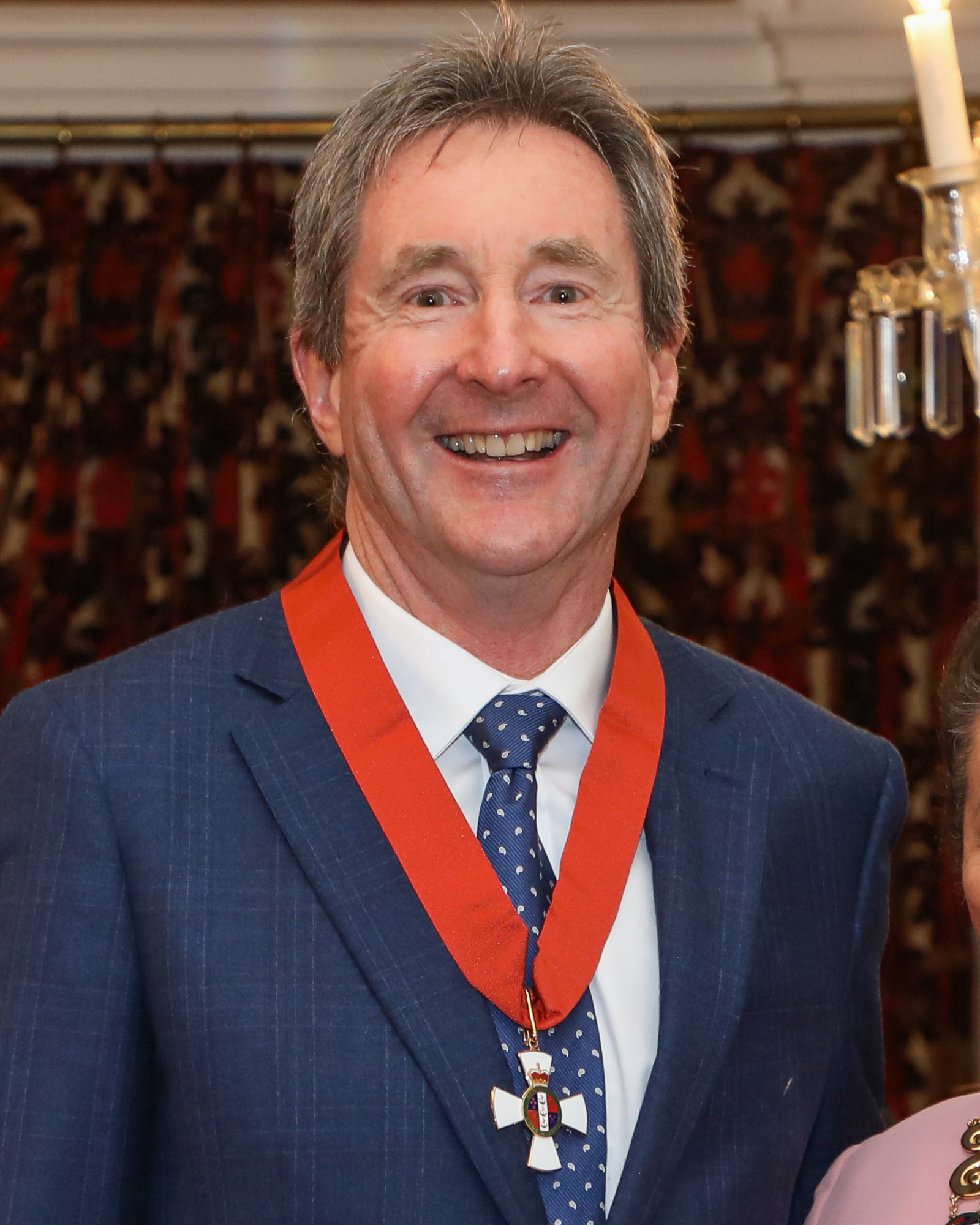
John Brakenridge

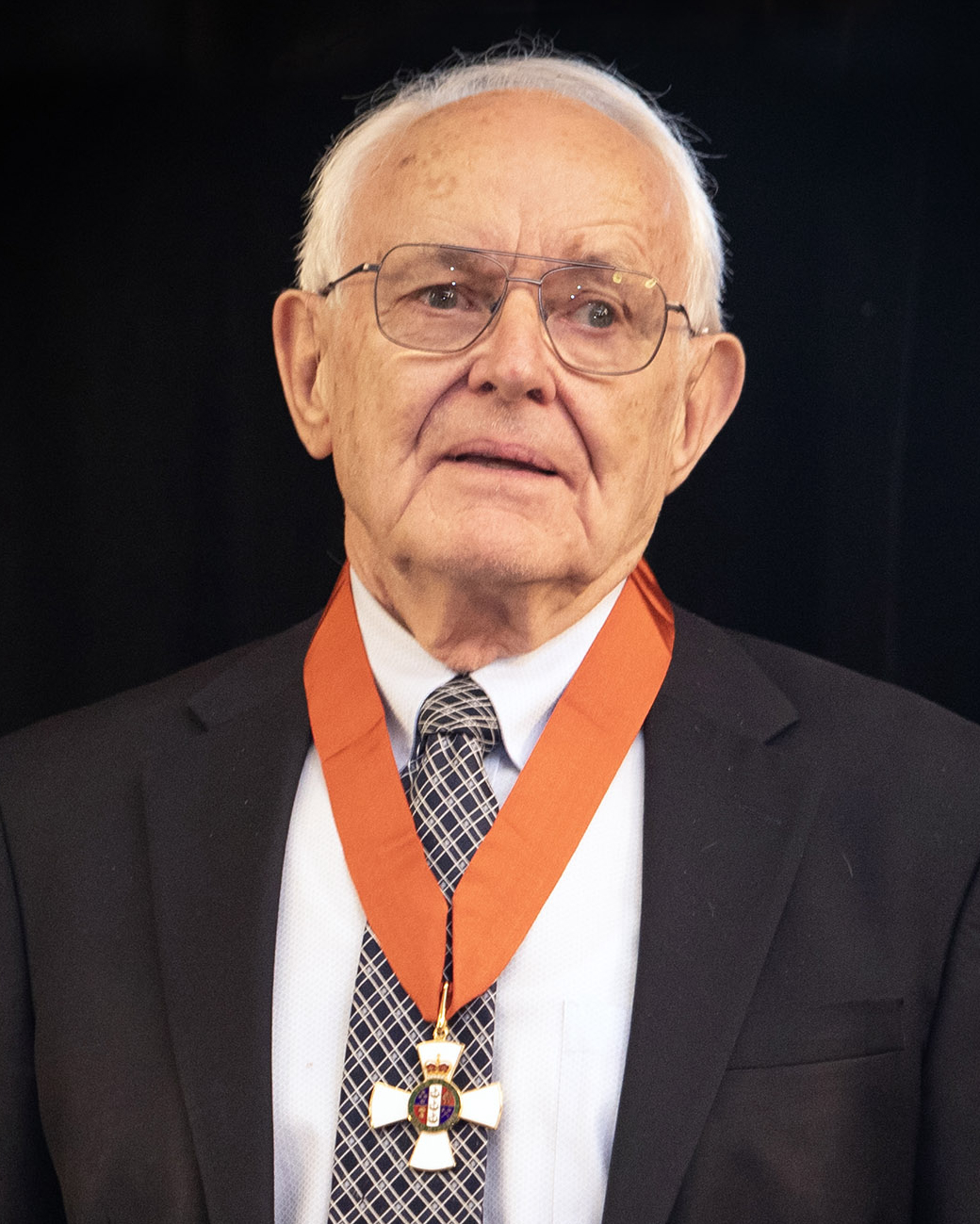
Graeme Bydder

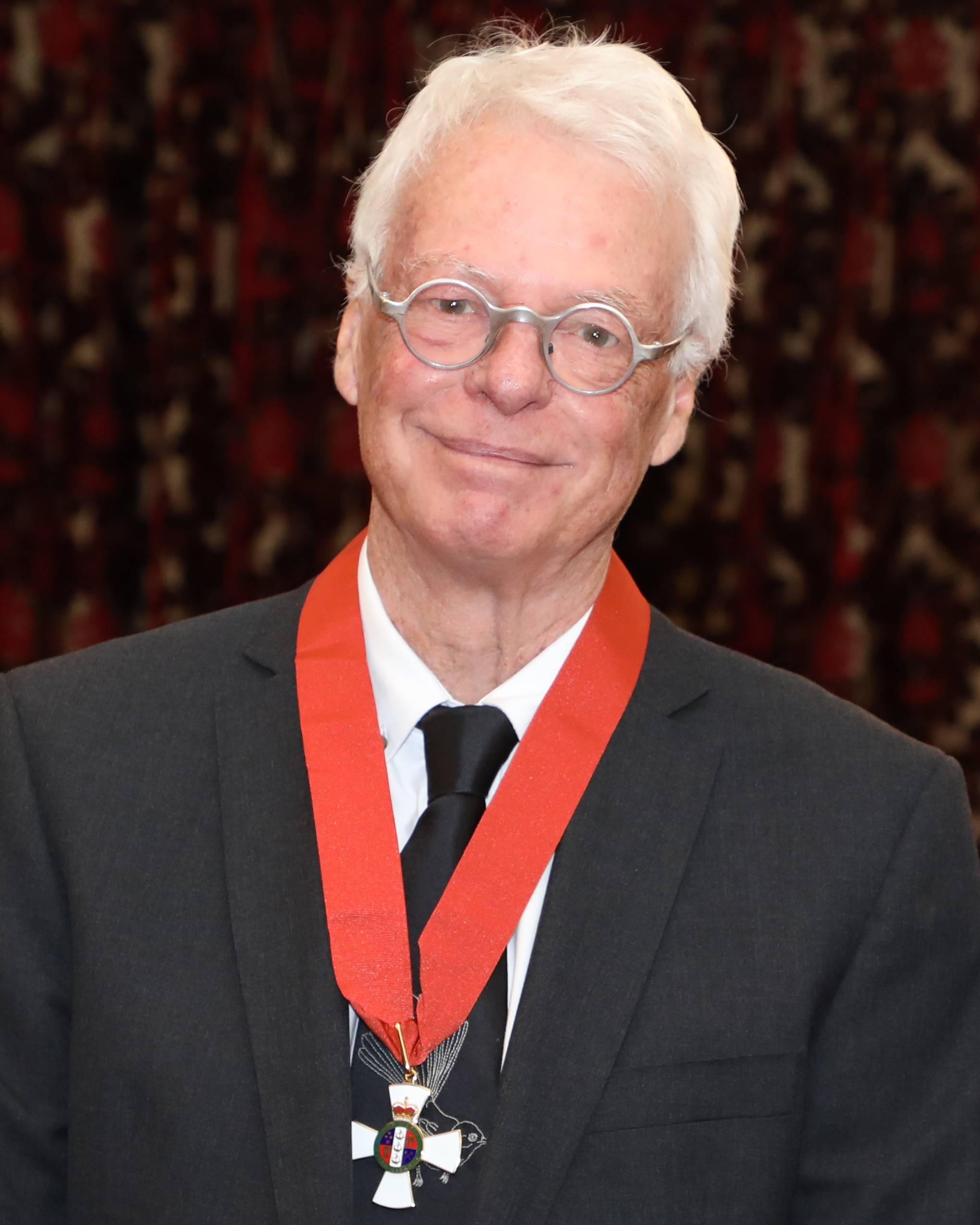
Pip Cheshire

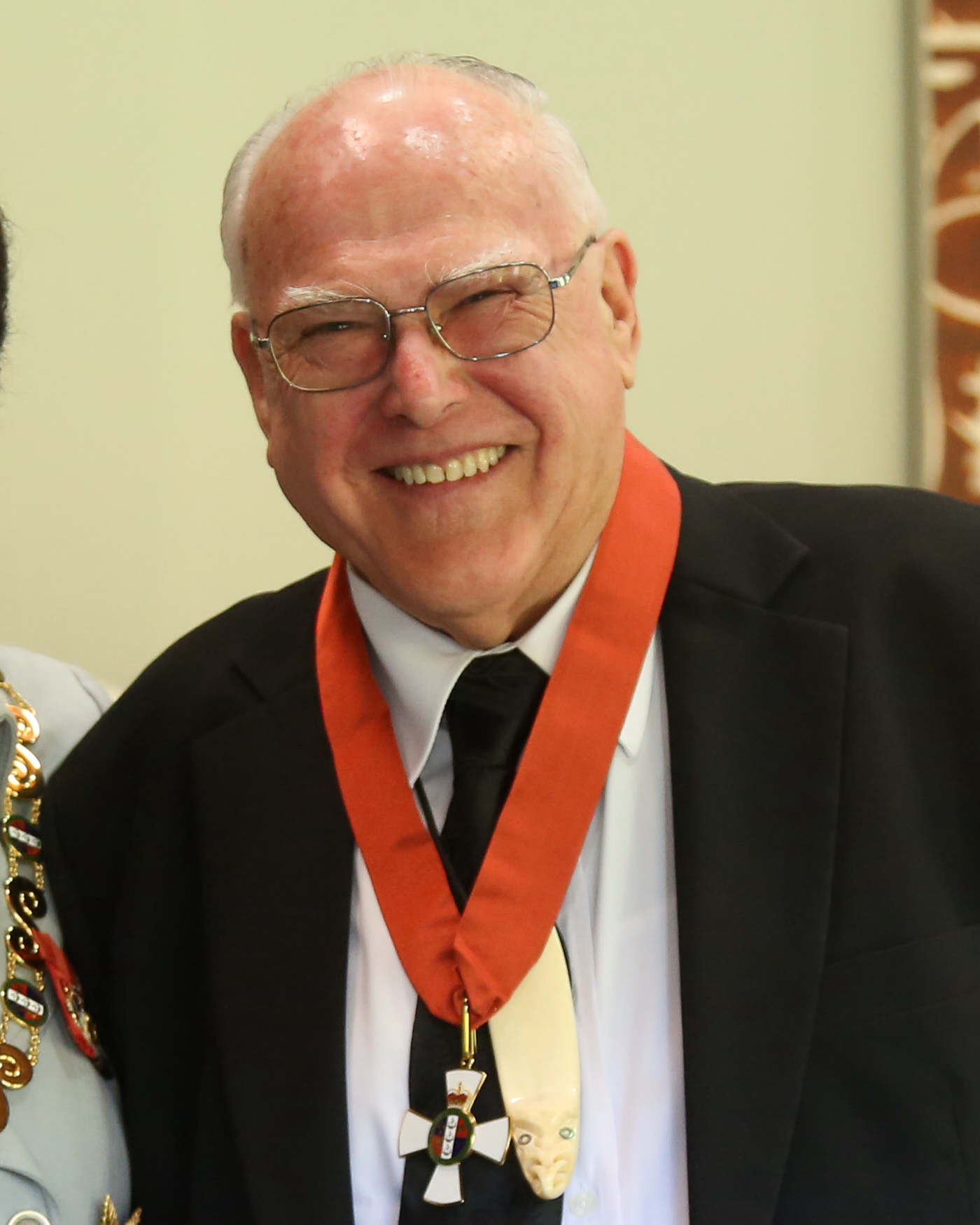
Clive Fugill

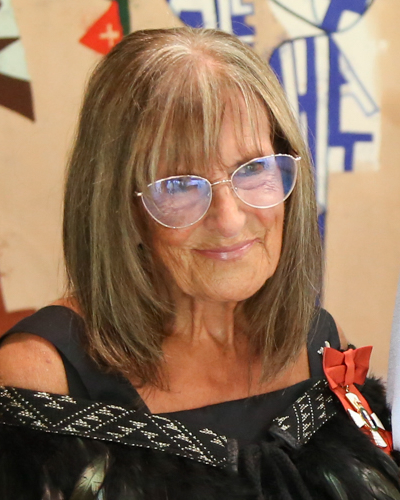
Dale Garratt

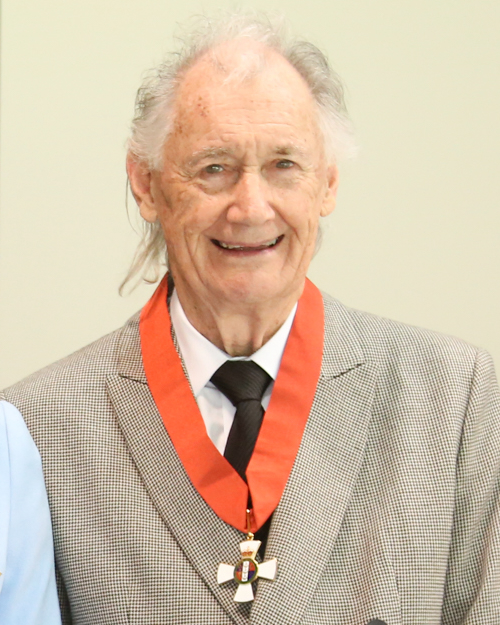
David Garratt

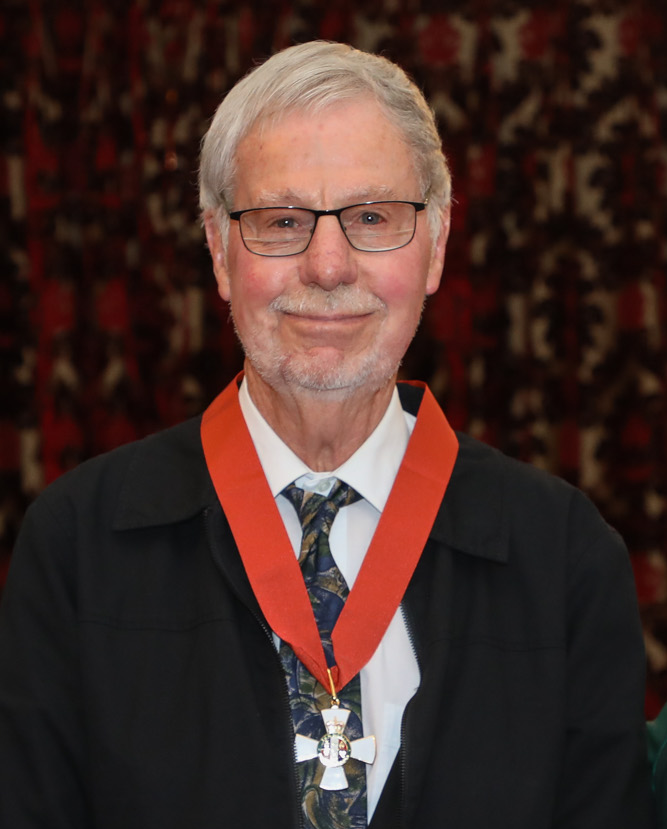
David Hill

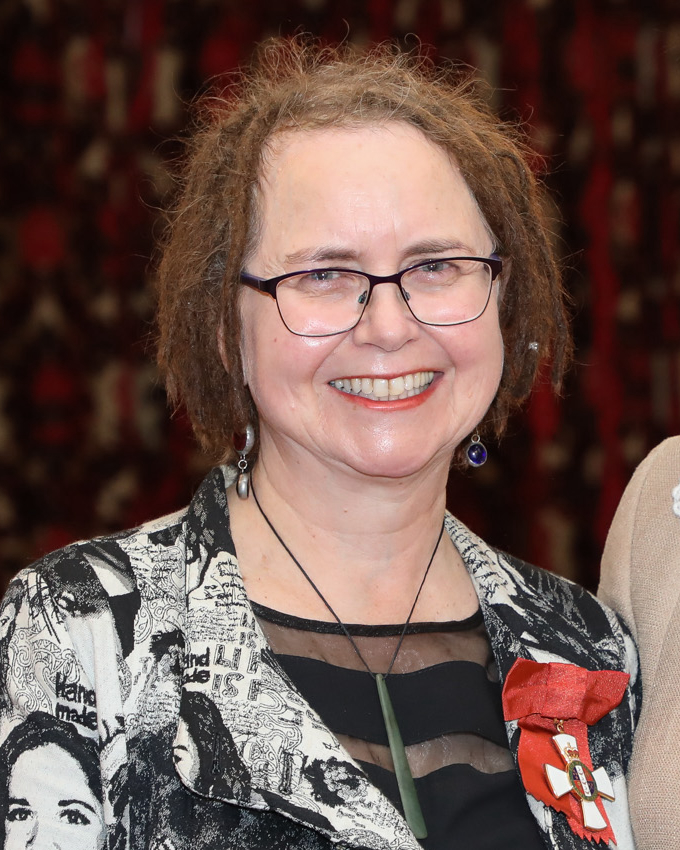
Yolanda Soryl

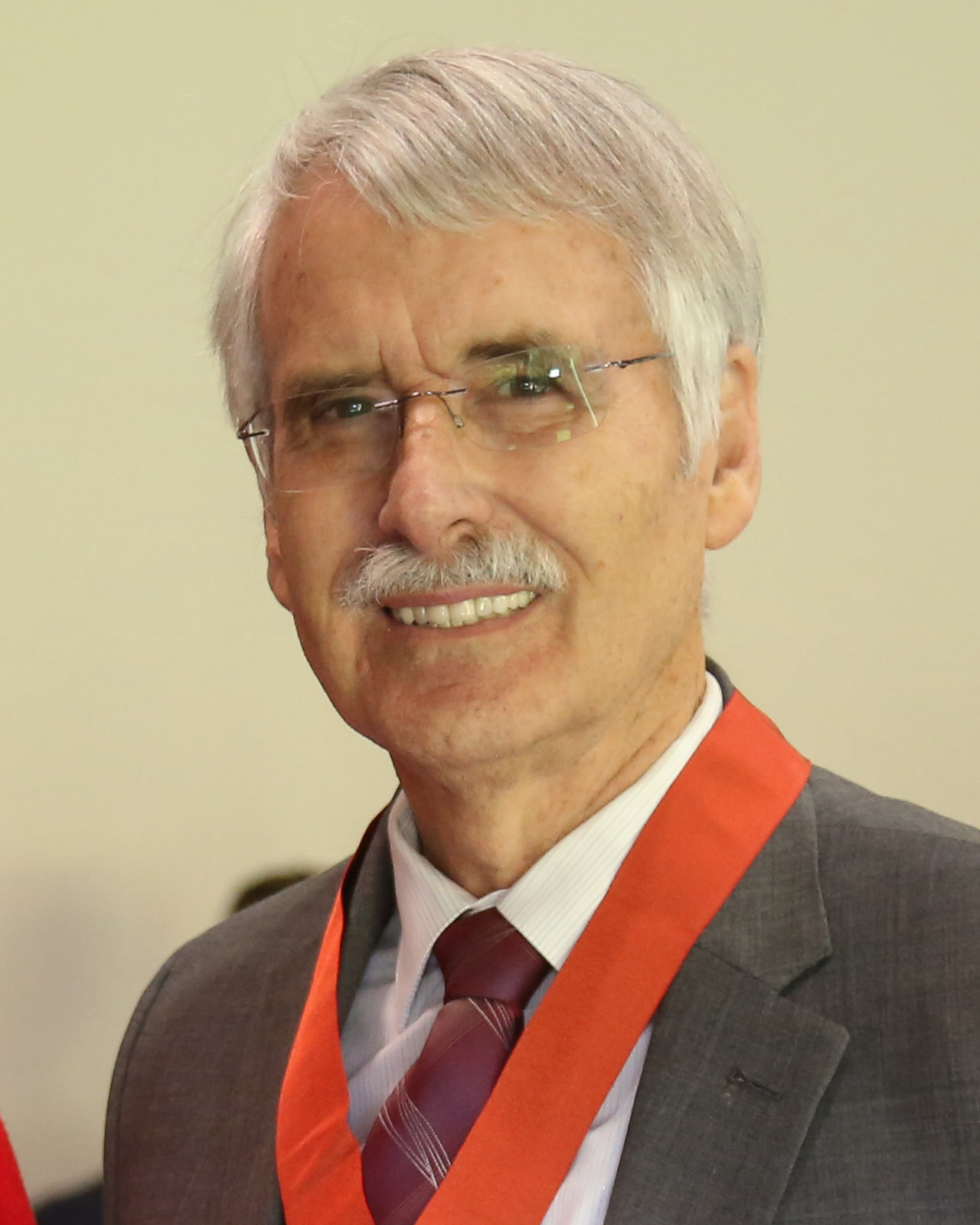
Kevin Trenberth

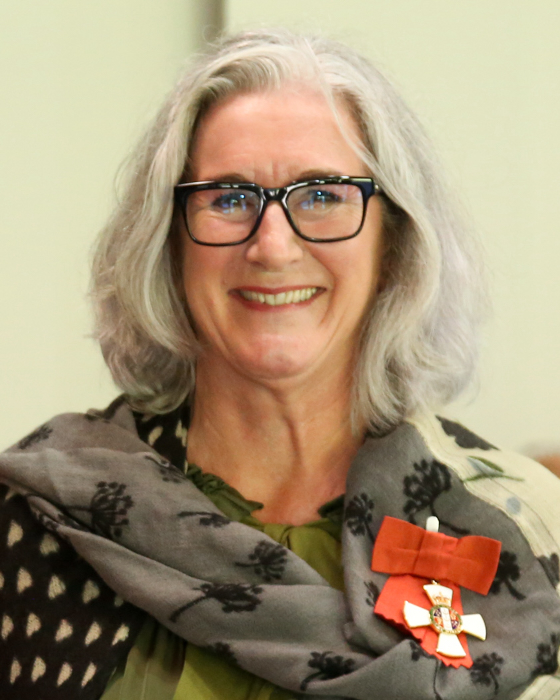
Jo-anne Wilkinson

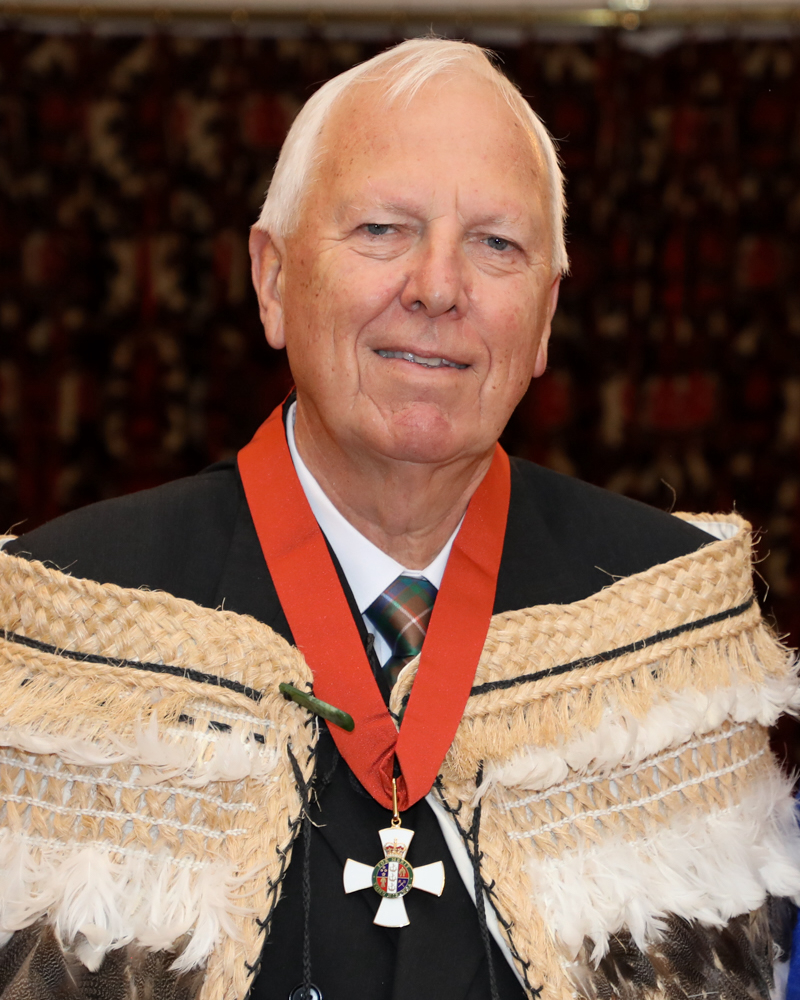
Ross Wilson

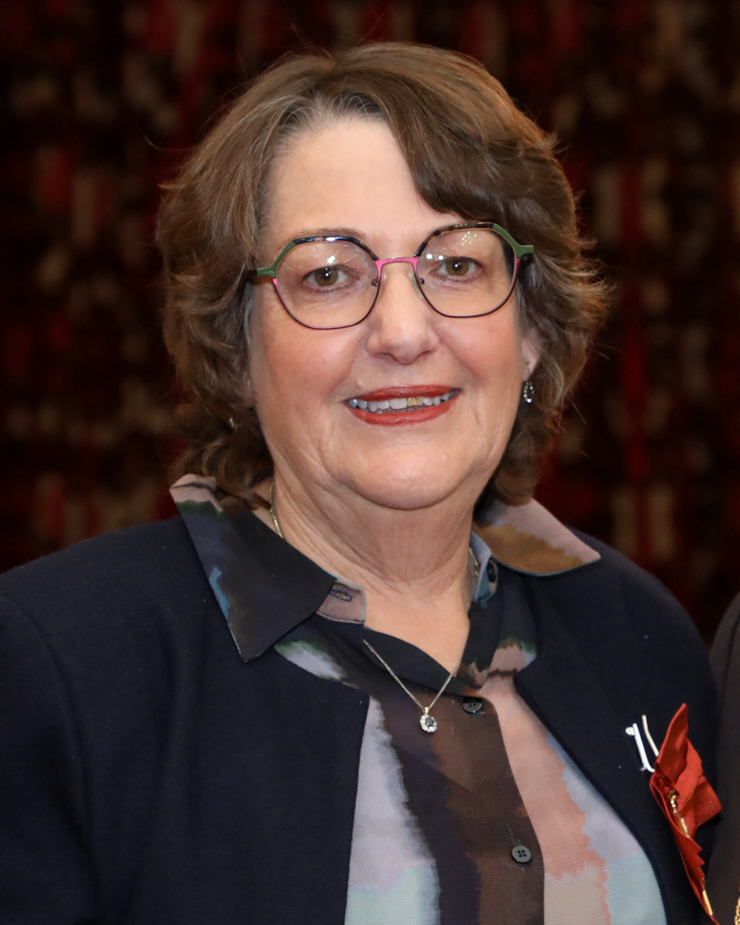
Johanna Wood

=== Officer (ONZM) ===
- Associate Professor James Gregory Anson – of Westmere. For services to exercise sciences and neuroscience.
- Susan Battye – of Point Chevalier. For services to performing arts education.
- Professor Francis Harry Bloomfield – of Mount Eden. For services to neonatology.
- Ereti Taetuha Brown QSM – of Te Atatū Peninsula. For services to Māori and early childhood education.
- Richard Waldron Bunton – of Roslyn, Dunedin. For services as a cardiac surgeon.
- Steven George Campbell – of Torbay. For services to Search and Rescue.
- Dr Rosemary Beatrice Cathcart QSM – of Lynmore. For services to gifted children.
- Dr Cherie Maria Chu-Fuluifaga – of Waikanae. For services to education.
- Valerie Ann Deakin – of Ōakura. For services to dance.
- Barbara Helen Dreaver – of Te Atatū Peninsula. For services to investigative journalism and Pacific communities.
- Dr Graeme Peter Elliott – of Moana, Nelson. For services to wildlife conservation.
- Philip Douglas Gifford – of Three Kings. For services to broadcasting and sports journalism.
- Theodora Mary Götz – of Māngere. For services to gymnastics.
- Anthony Trevor Gray – of Havelock North. For services to accounting and Māori business.
- Detective Inspector Craig James Hamilton – of Hamilton. For services to the New Zealand Police and the community.
- Rosemary Alice Henderson – of Avonhead. For services to social work and health.
- Robert George Holding – of Auckland Central. For services to Pacific literature and business.
- Associate Professor Tristram Richard Ingham – of Karori. For services to the disability community.
- Emeritus Professor Edith Marion Jones – of Northpark. For services to education.
- Marie Carmel Celebrado Lindaya – of Nelson South. For services to multicultural communities.
- Frank Lindsay – of Johnsonville. For services to the apiculture industry.
- Norah Elizabeth Matthews – of Beach Haven. For services to curling.
- Hamish John McCrostie – of Havelock North. For services to outdoor recreation and search and rescue.
- James Robert Morris – of Hikurangi. For services to table tennis.
- Dr Hana Merenea O'Regan – of Mairehau. For services to education.
- Dr Anneliese Ruth Parkin – of Kelburn. For services to the public service.
- Jane Frances Patterson MNZM – of Ponsonby. For services to sports administration.
- Kevin Frank Pivac – of Te Atatū South. For services to the deaf rugby community.
- Mary-Jane Rivers – of Ōtaki. For services to community-led development, governance and education.
- Dr Caroline Seelig – of Silverstream. For services to education.
- Tania Joy Te Rangingangana Simpson – of Matangi. For services to governance and Māori.
- Dr Simon Snook – of Carterton. For services to reproductive health.
- Larnce Joseph Wichman – of Redwoodtown. For services to the seafood industry and marine conservation.
- Rosemary Dawn Wilkinson – of Lyall Bay. For services to the blind and vision-impaired community.
- Major-General Evan George Williams – of Te Aroha. For services to the New Zealand Defence Force.
- Emeritus Professor Peter Donald Wilson – of Motueka. For services to obstetrics and gynaecology.
- Jodi Ann Wright – of Clifton. For services to the arts.
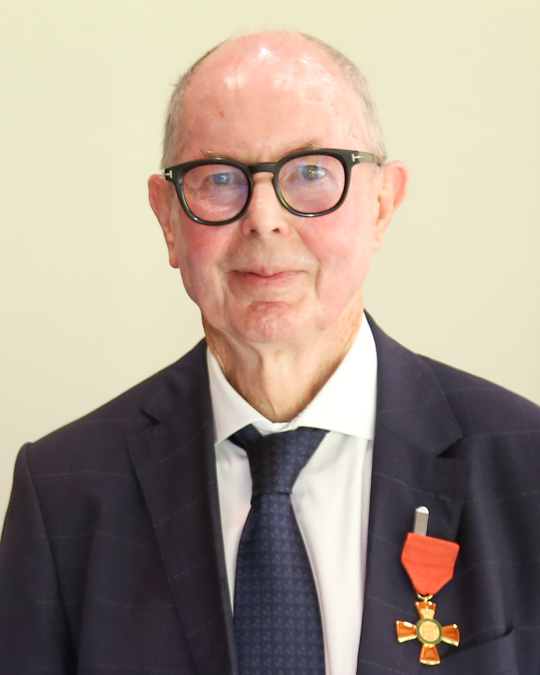
Greg Anson

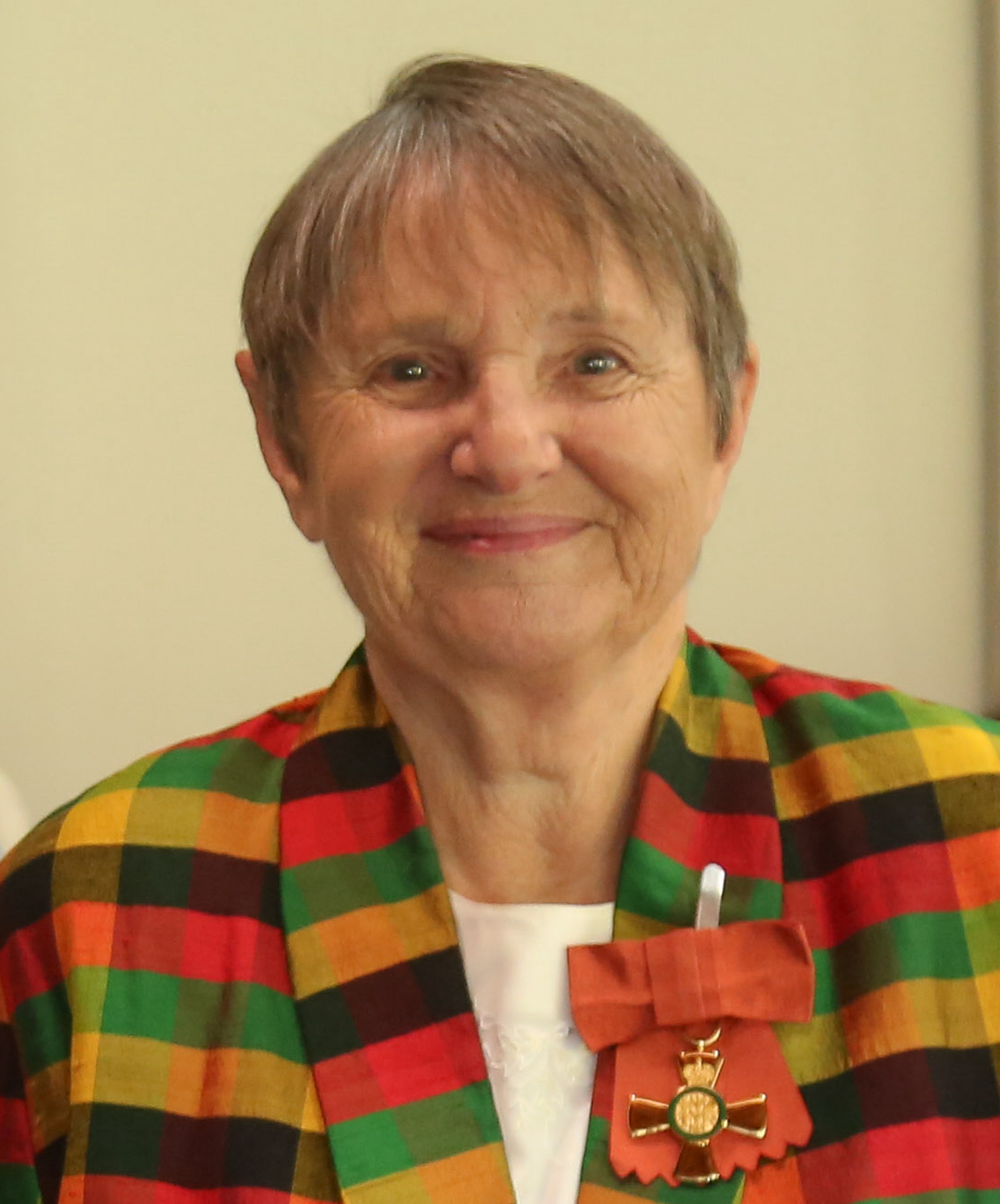
Susan Battye

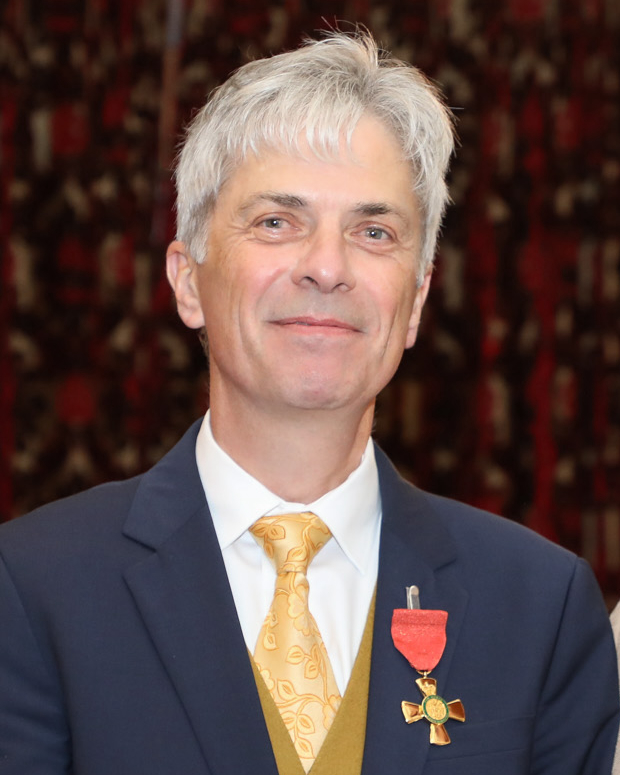
Frank Bloomfield

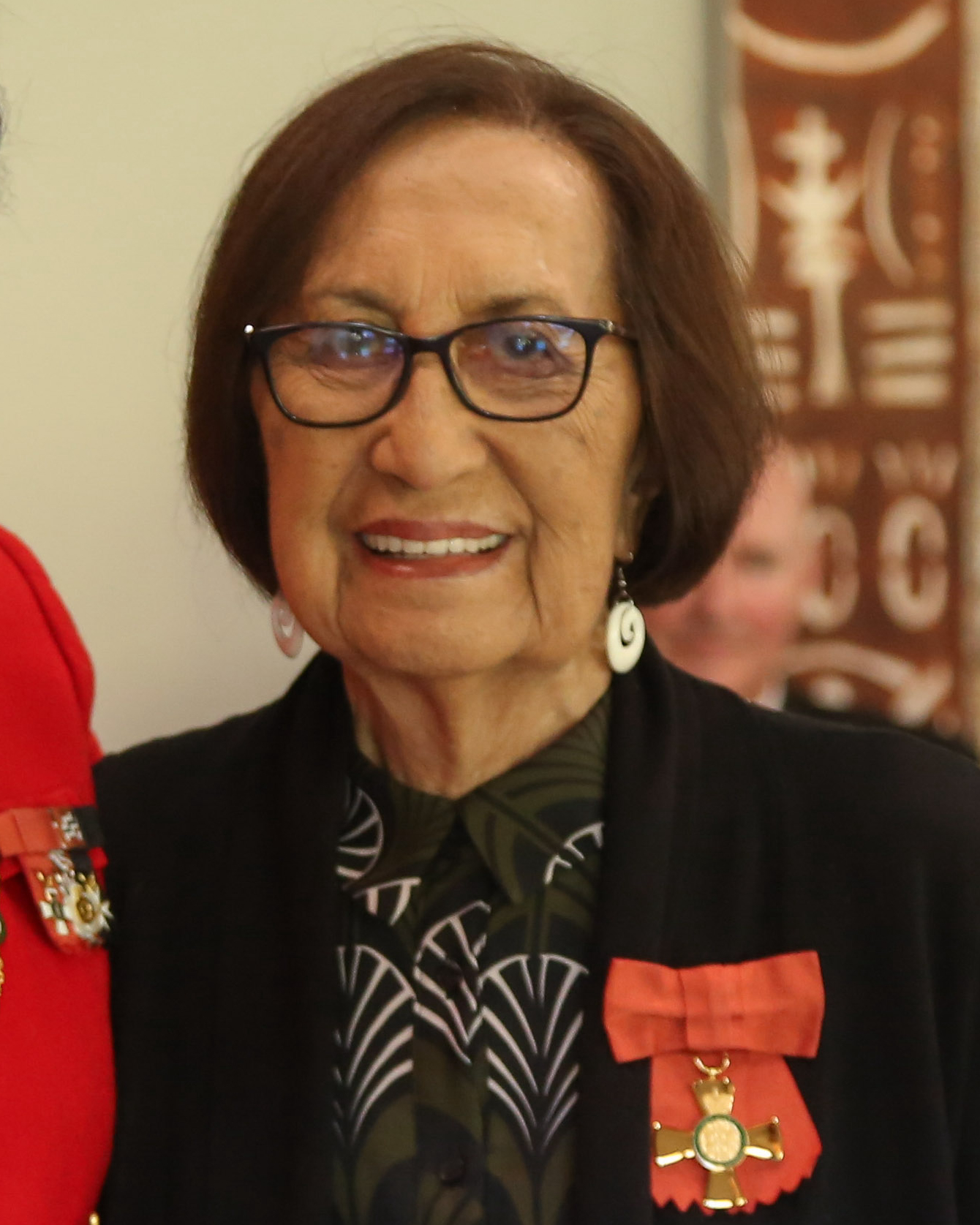
Letty Brown

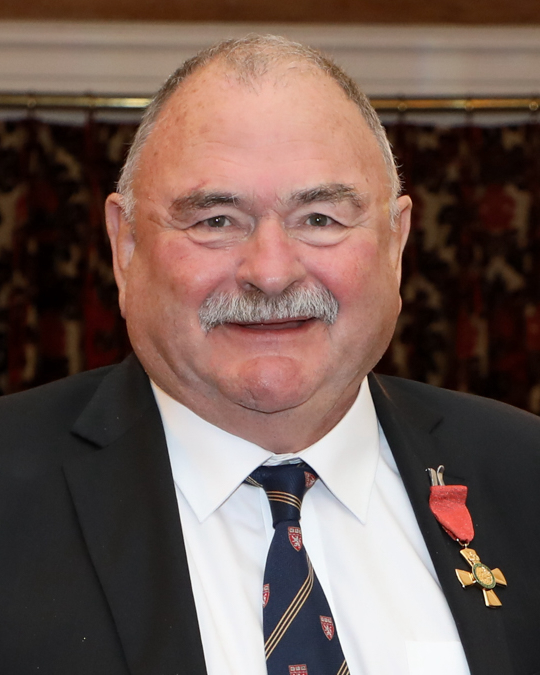
Dick Bunton

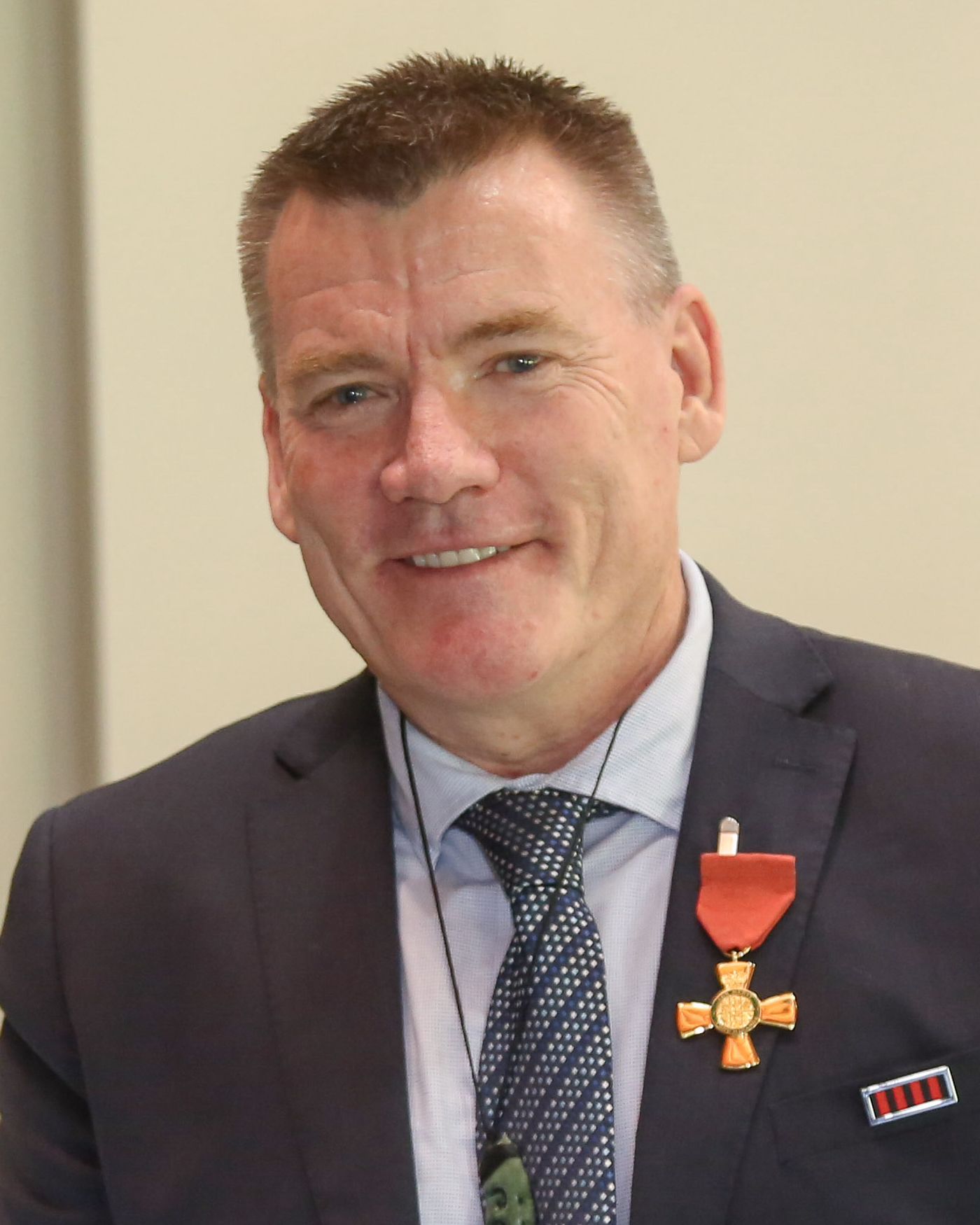
Steve Campbell

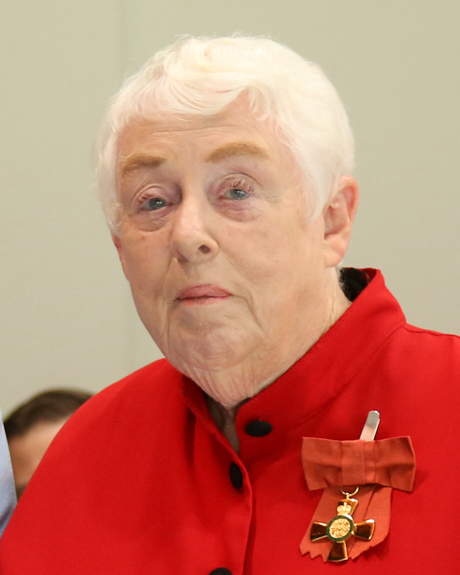
Rosemary Cathcart

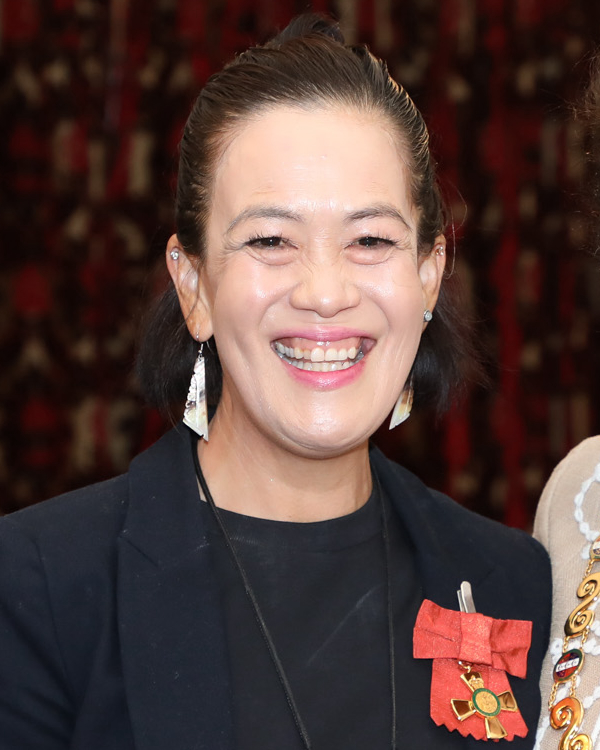
Cherie Chu‑Fuluifaga

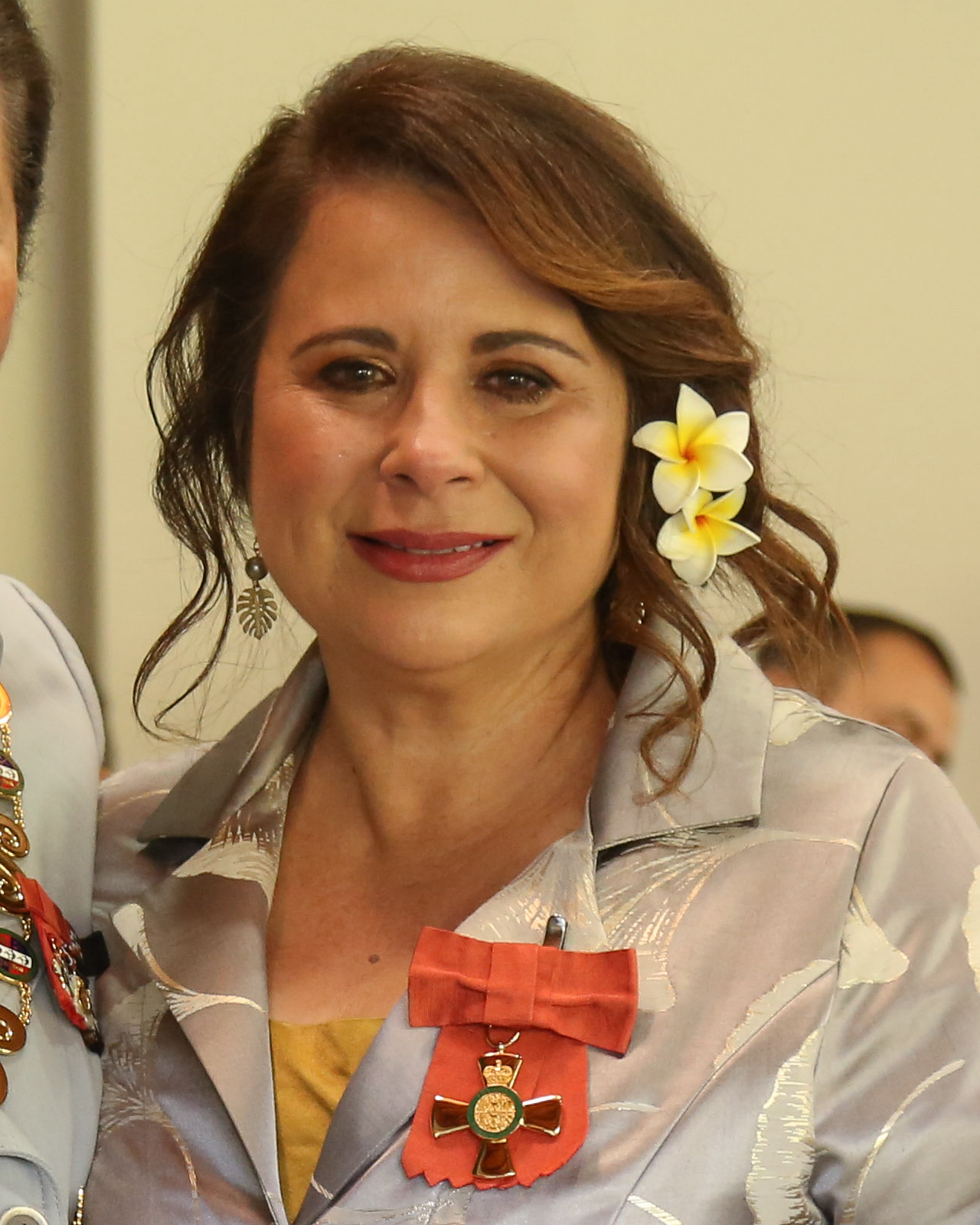
Barbara Dreaver

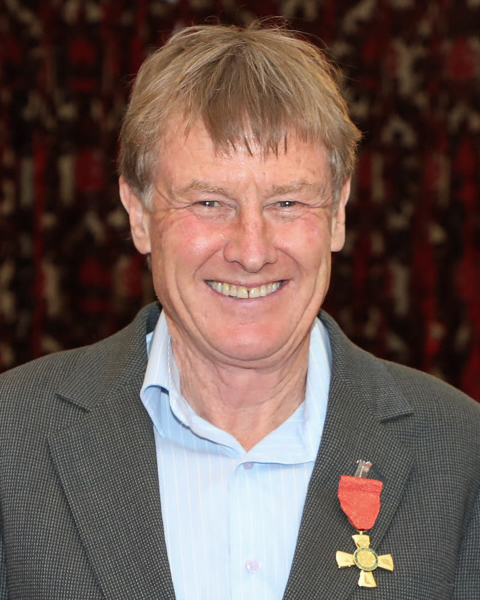
Graeme Elliott

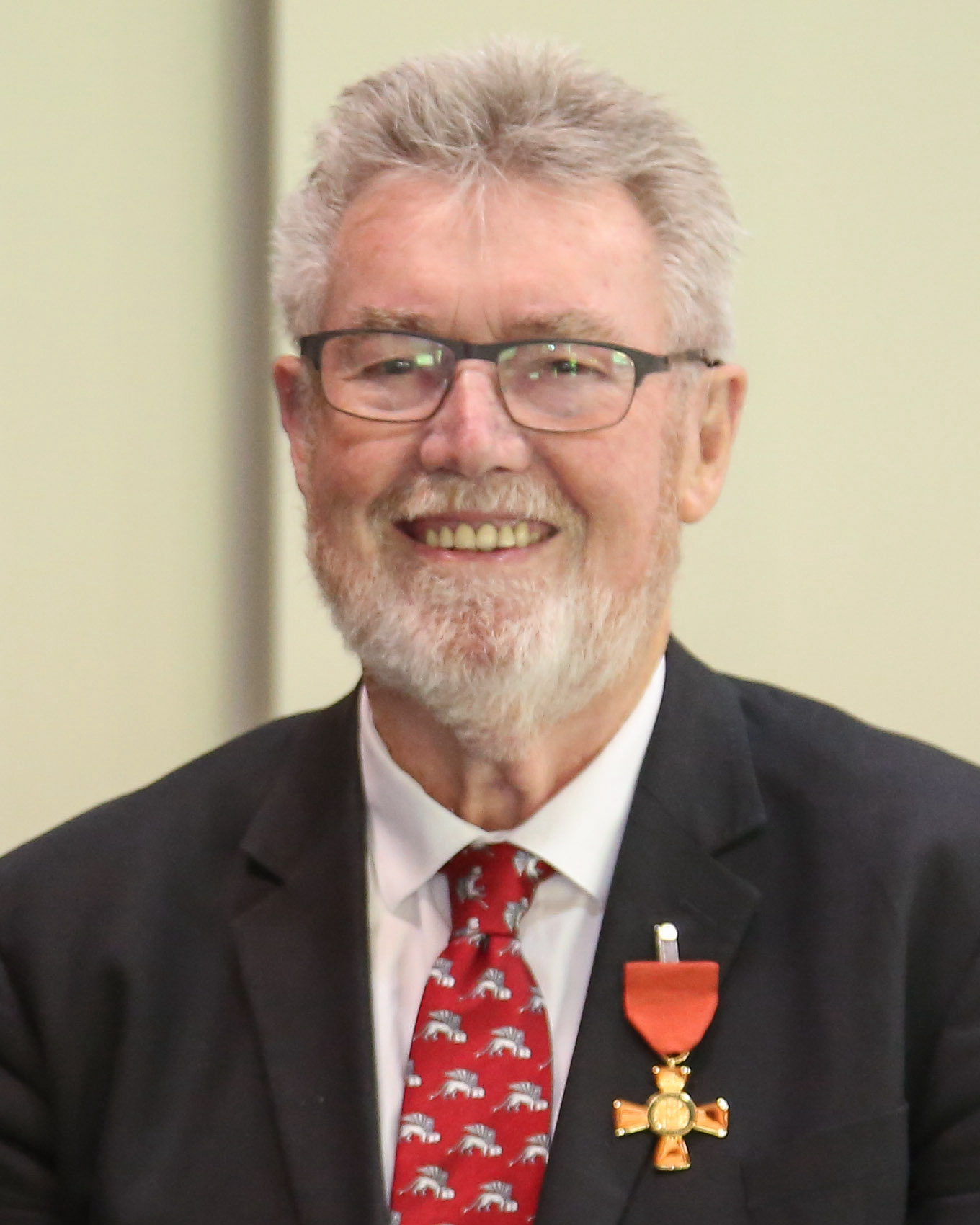
Phil Gifford

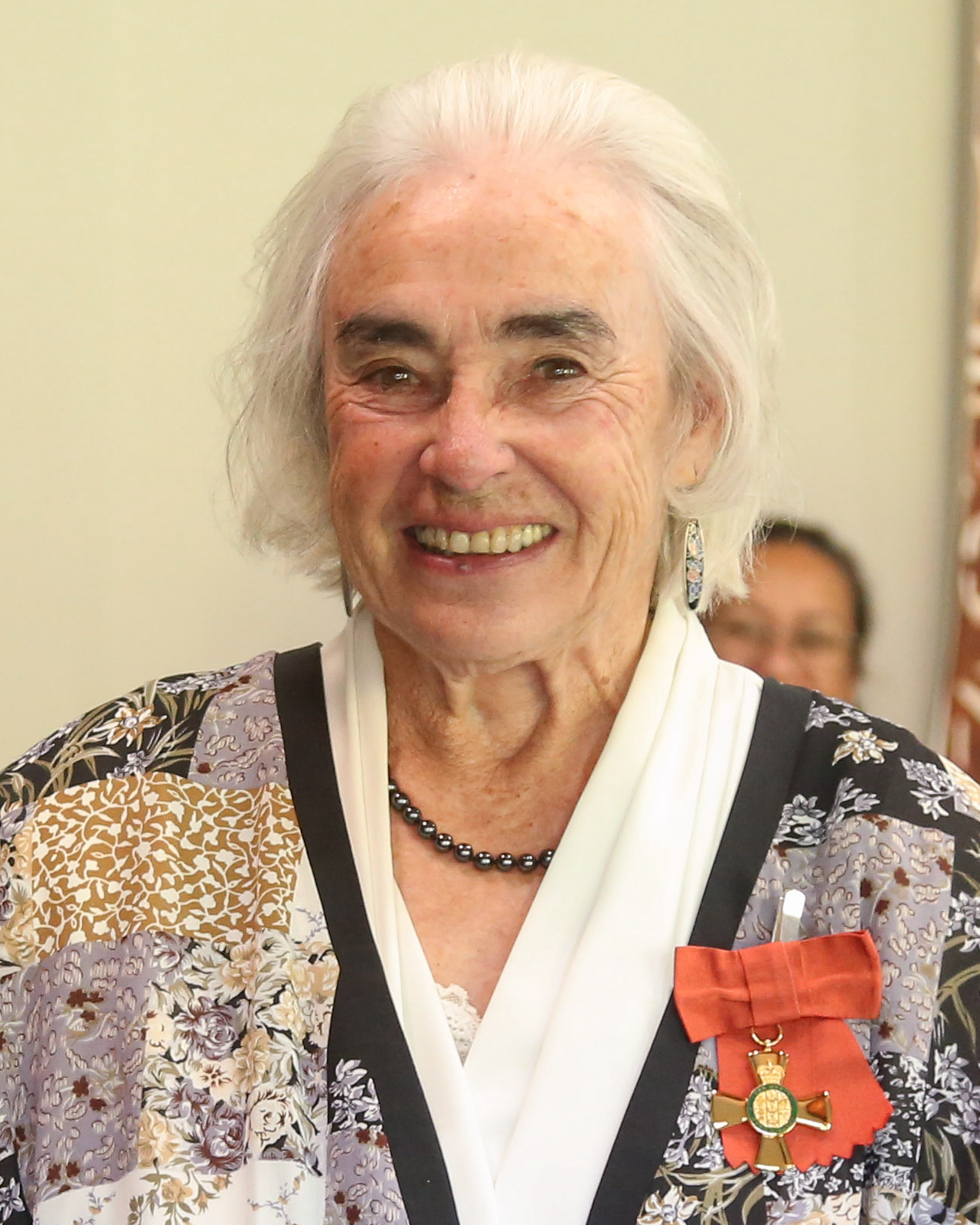
Theodora Götz

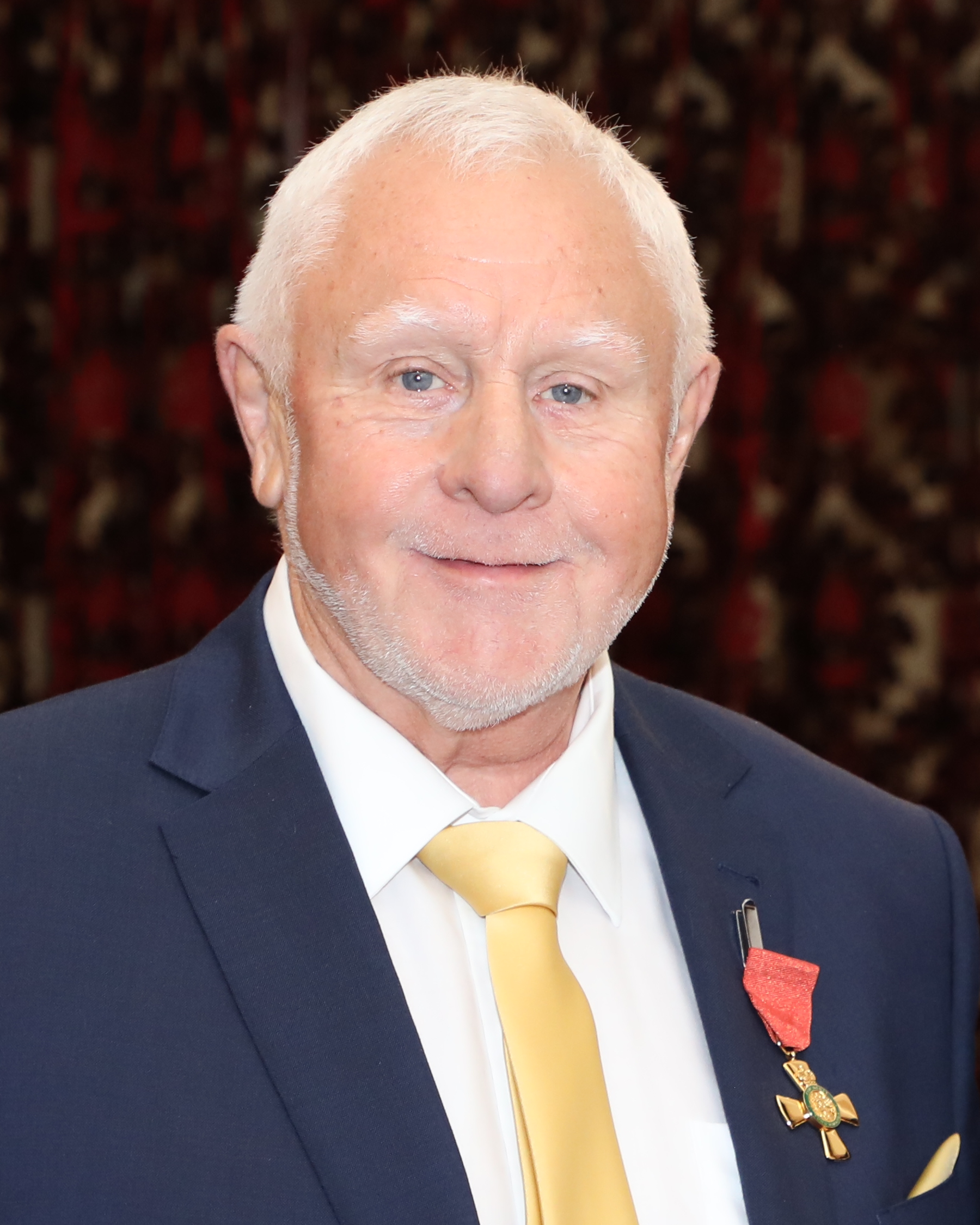
Anthony Gray

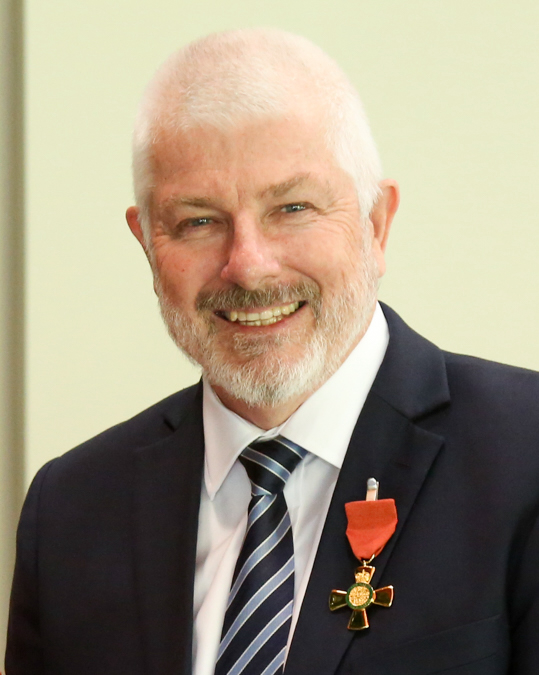
Craig Hamilton

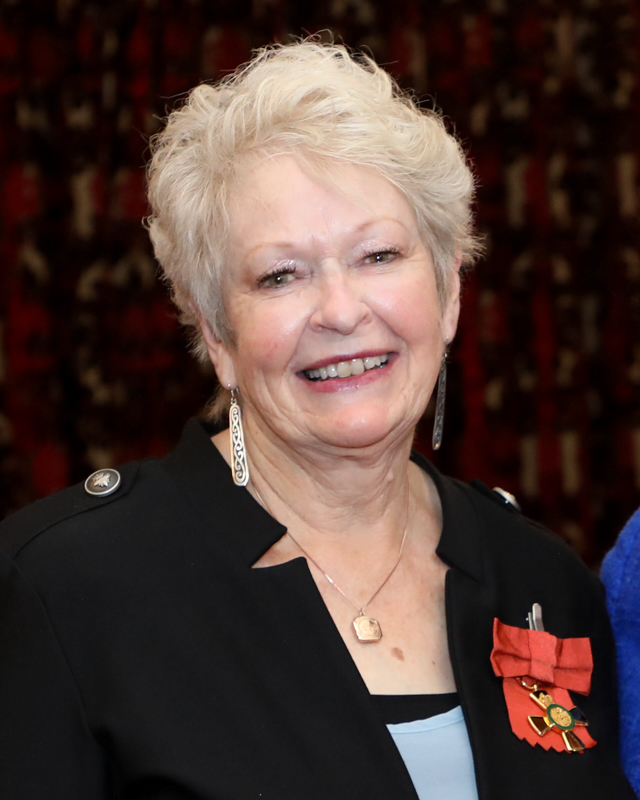
Rose Henderson

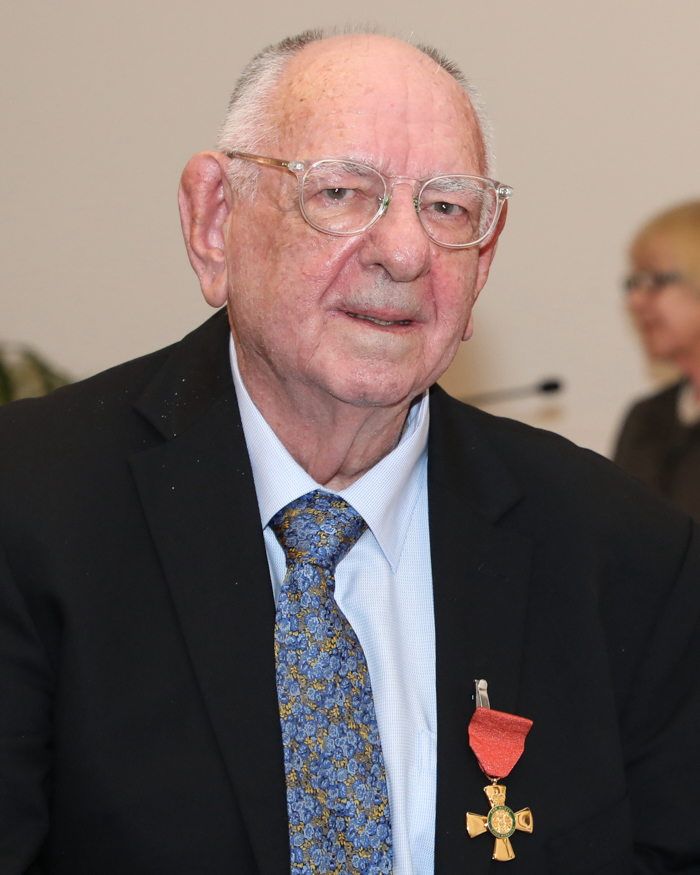
Robert Holding

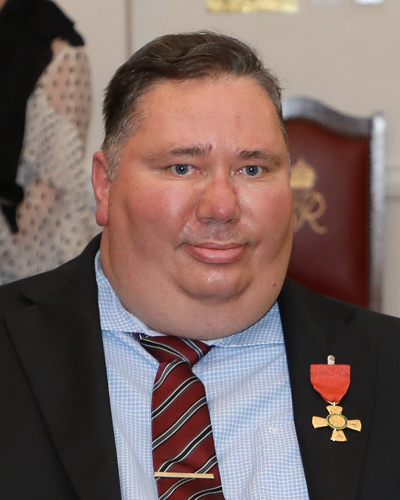
Tristram Ingham

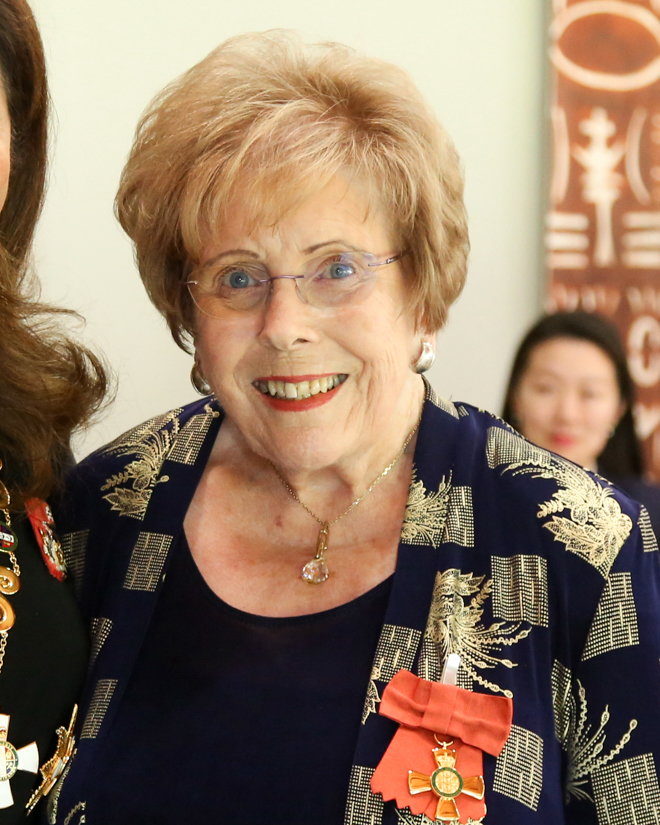
Marion Jones

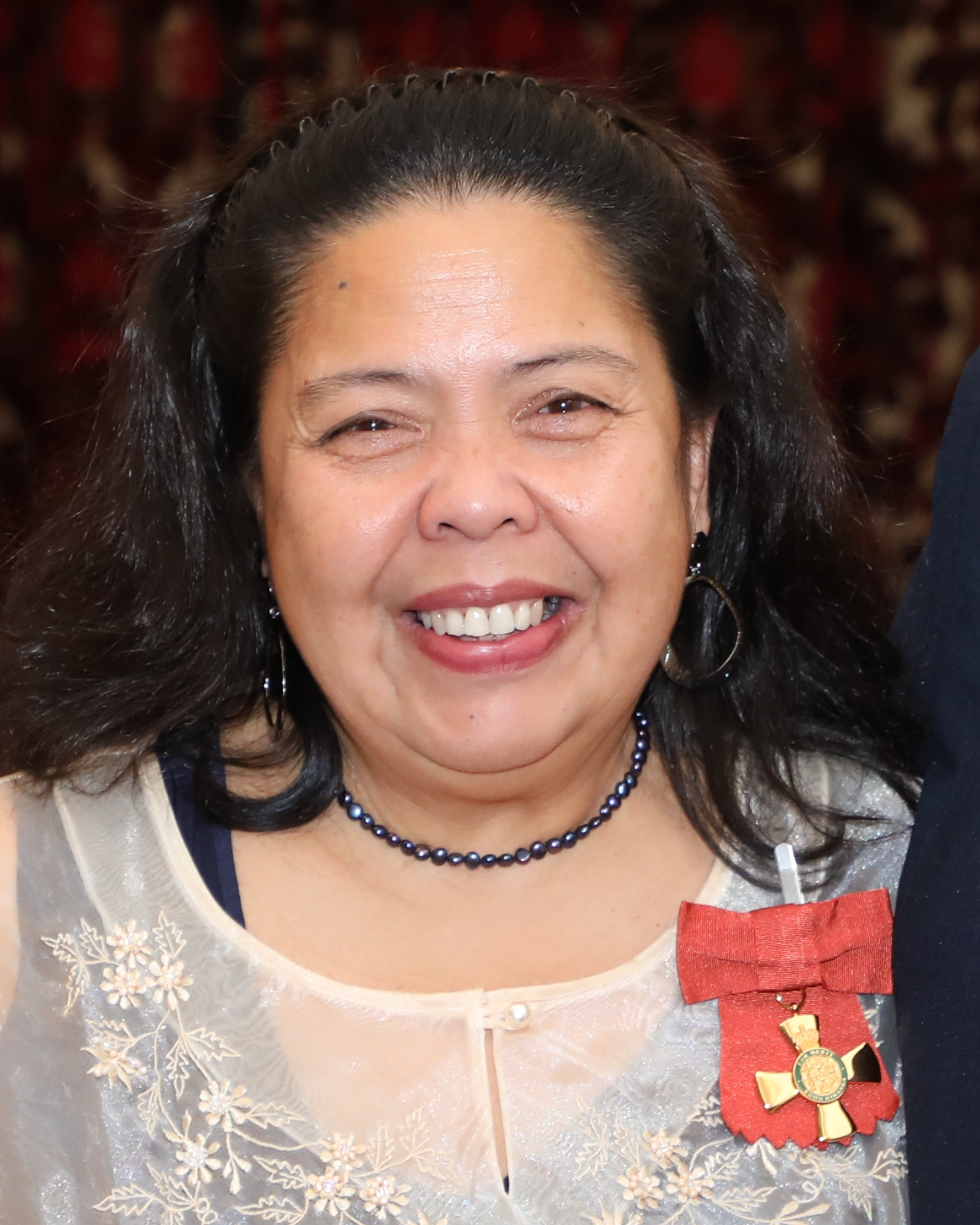
Marie Lindaya

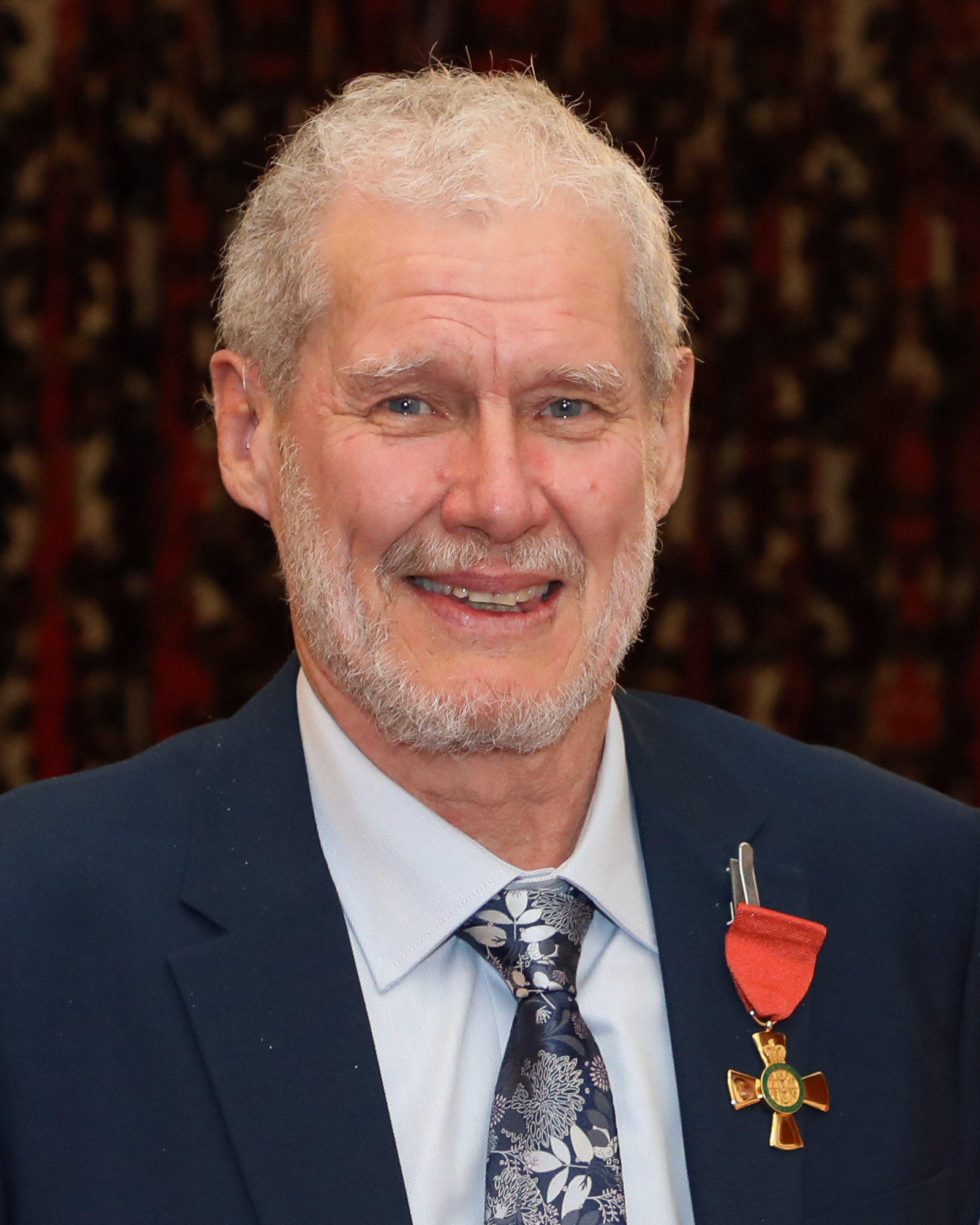
Frank Lindsay

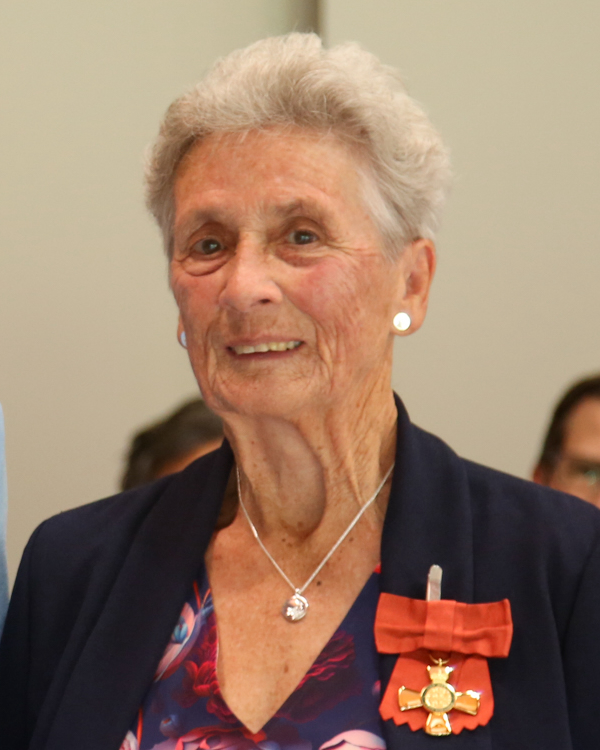
Elizabeth Matthews

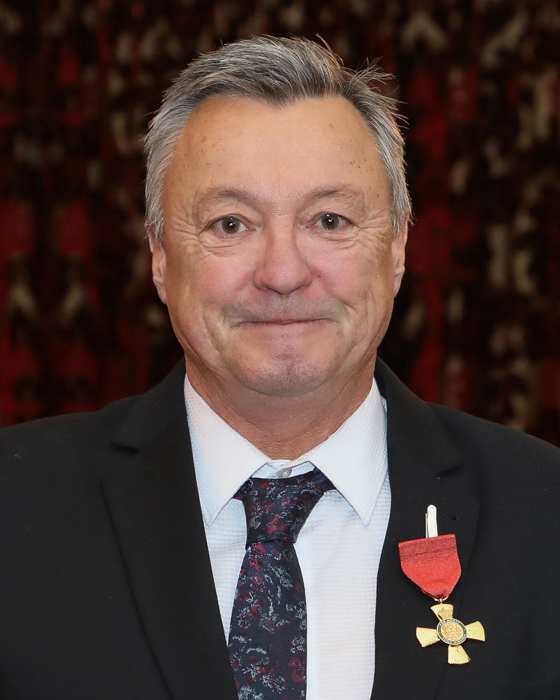
Hamish McCrostie

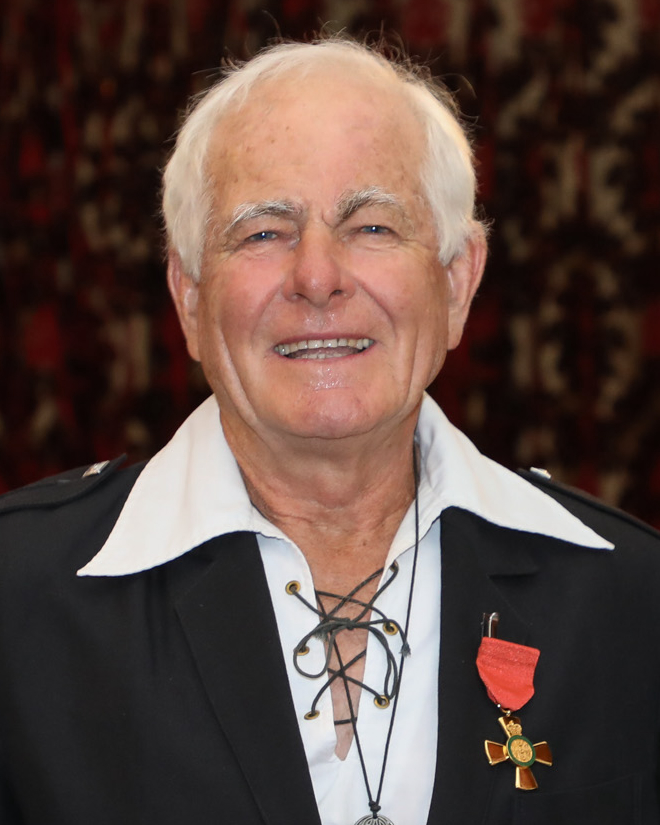
James Morris

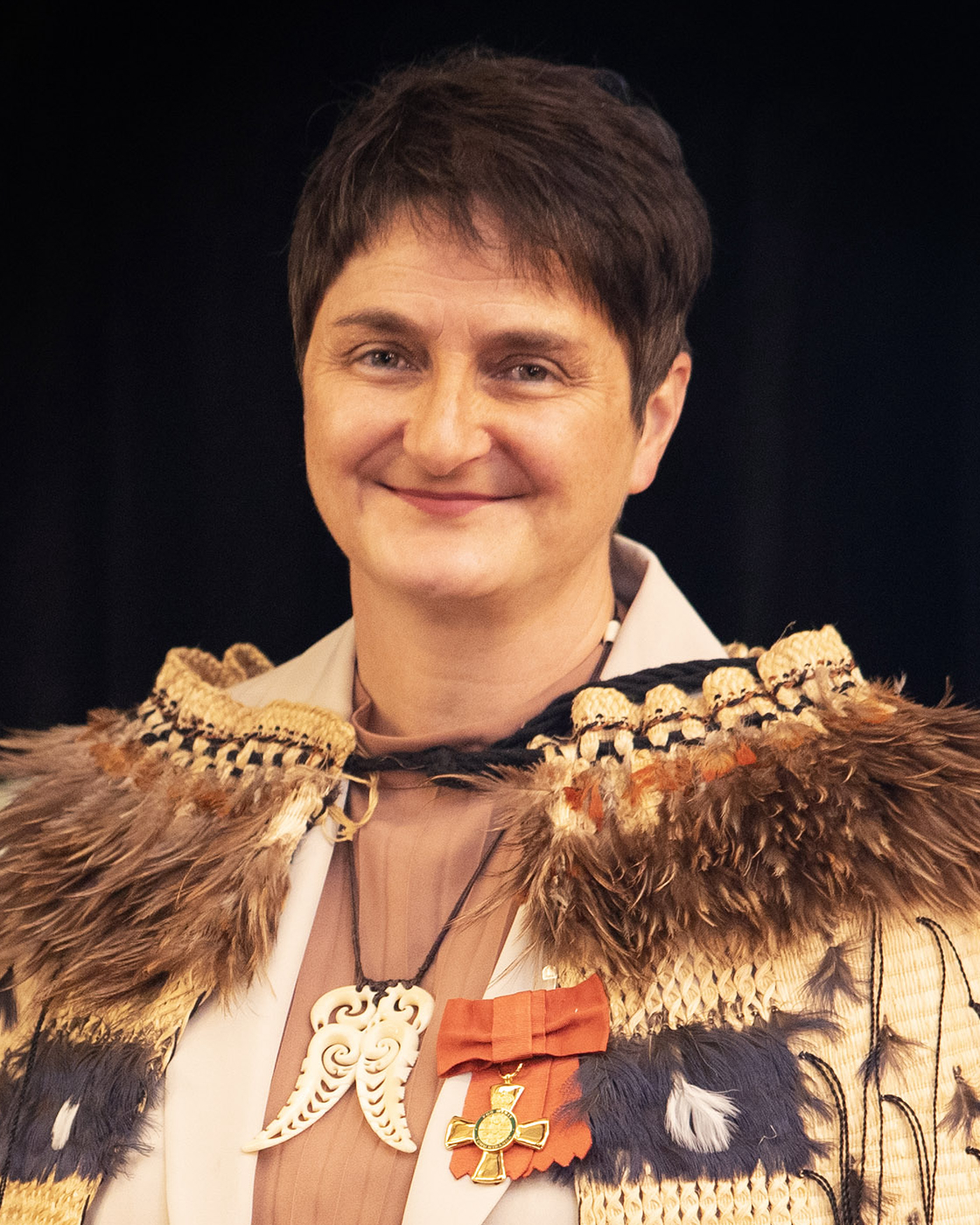
Hana O'Regan

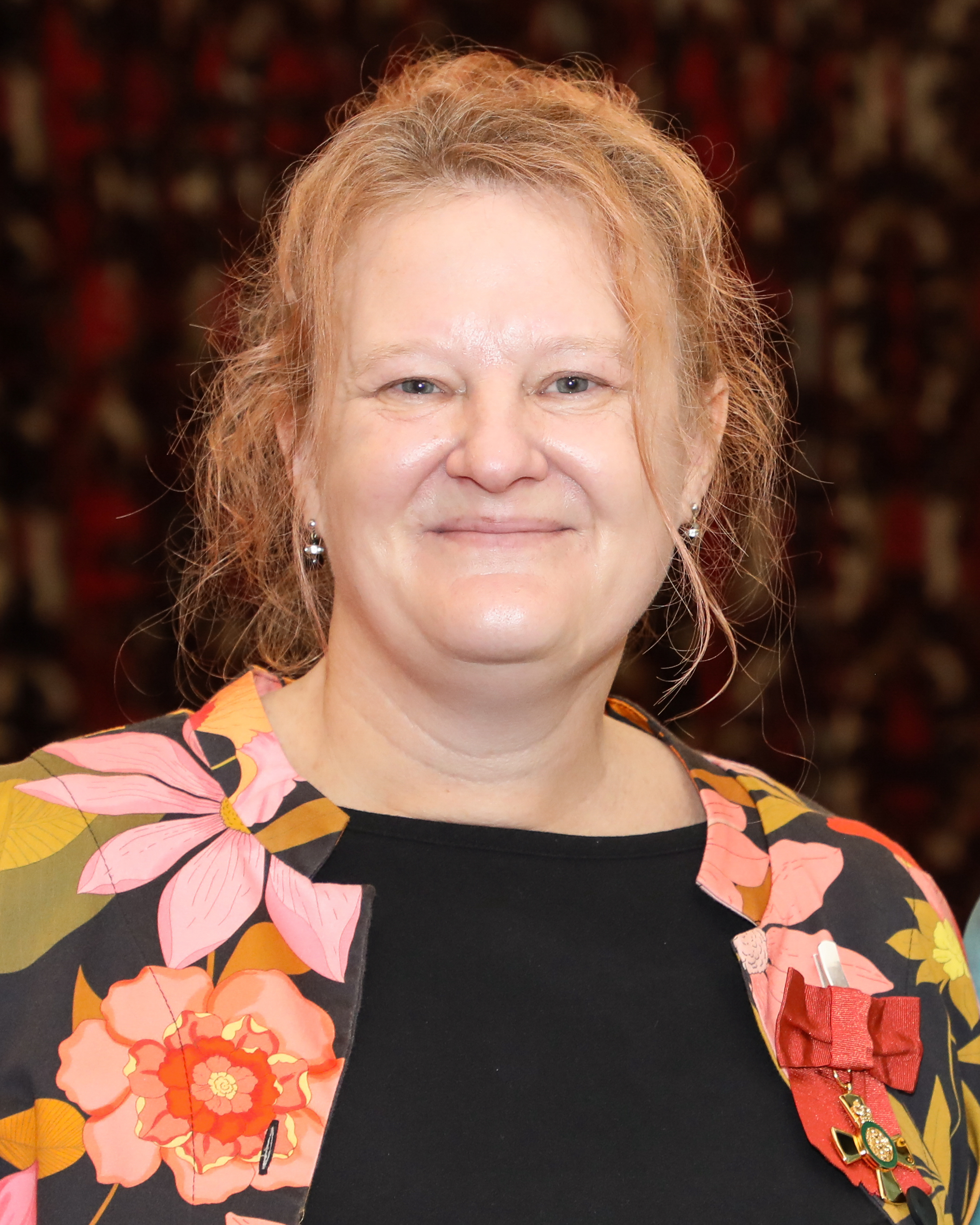
Anneliese Parkin

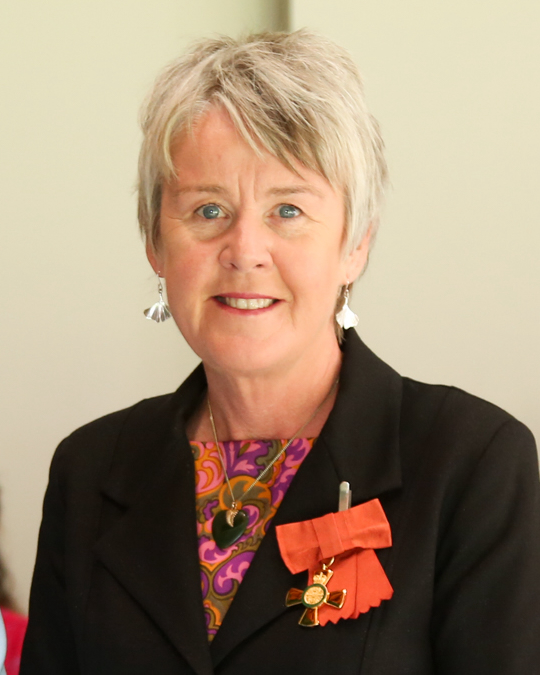
Jane Patterson

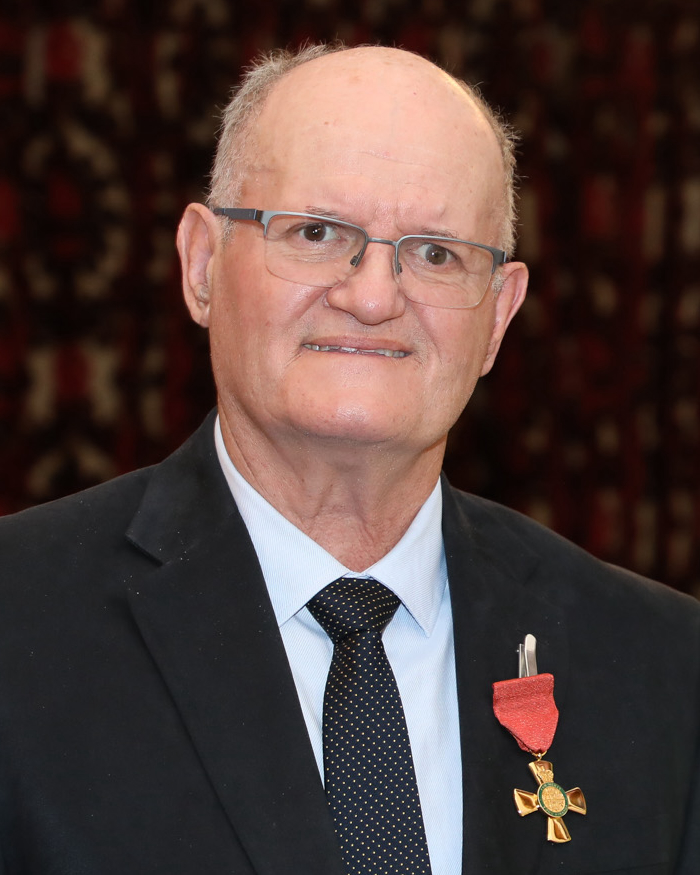
Kevin Pivac

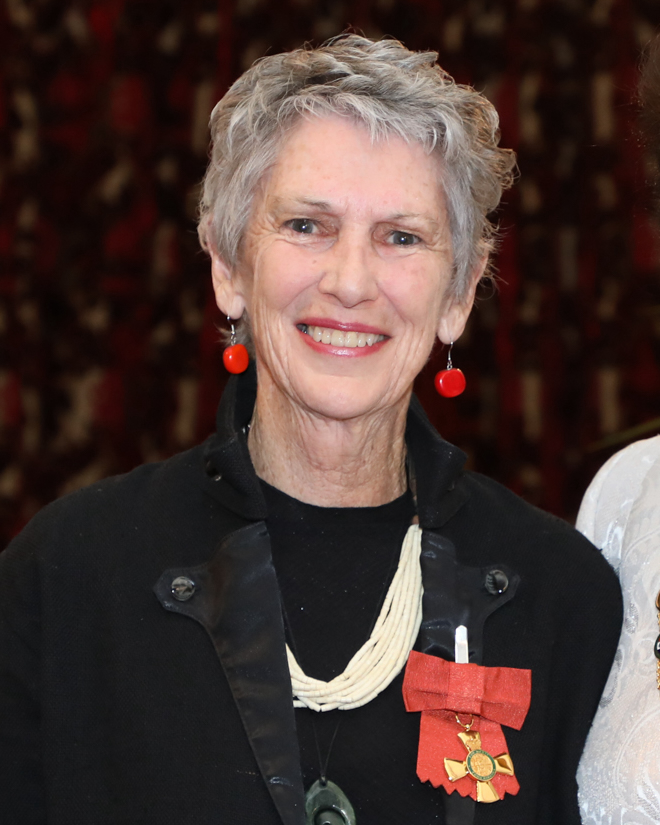
Mary-Jane Rivers

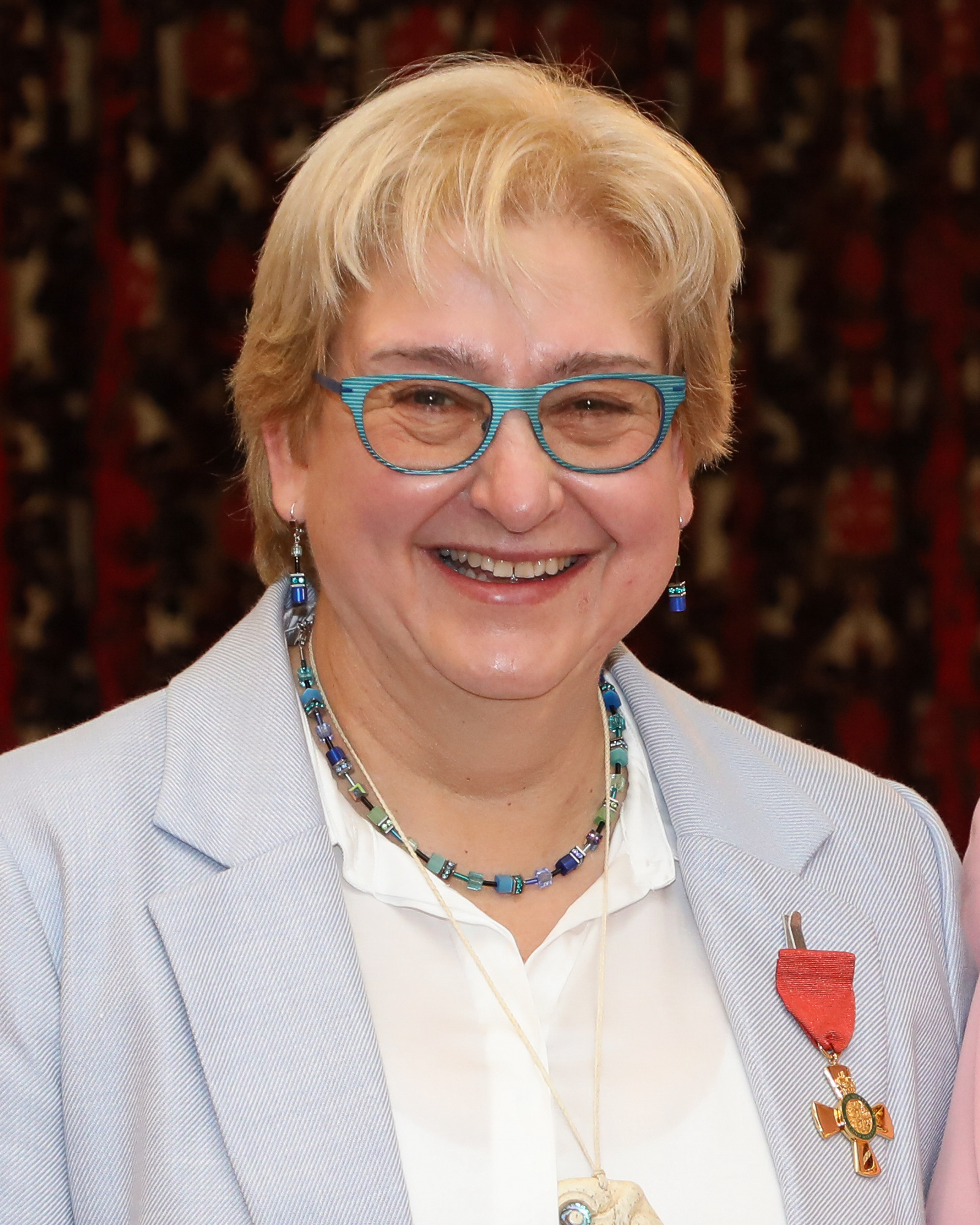
Caroline Seelig

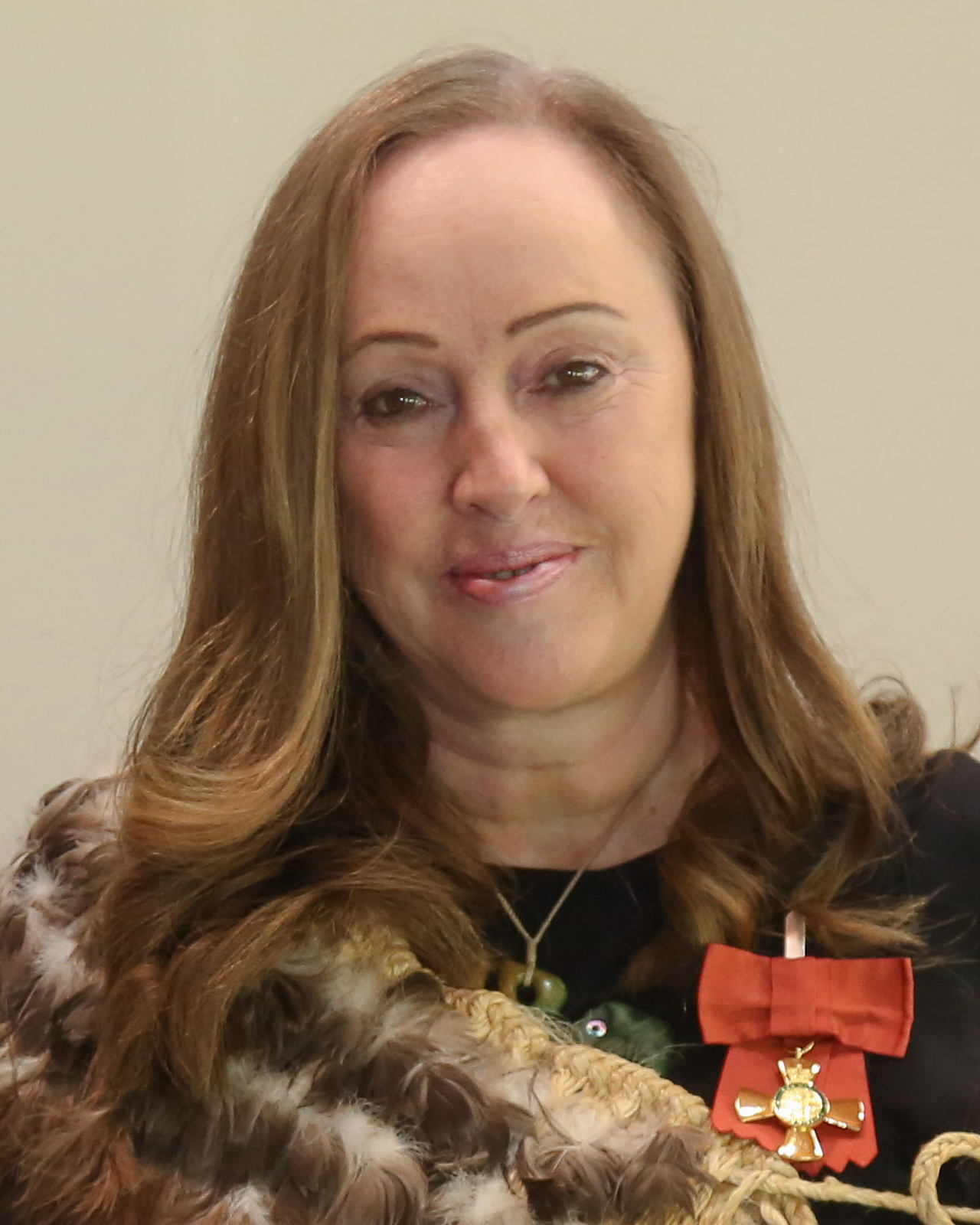
Tania Simpson

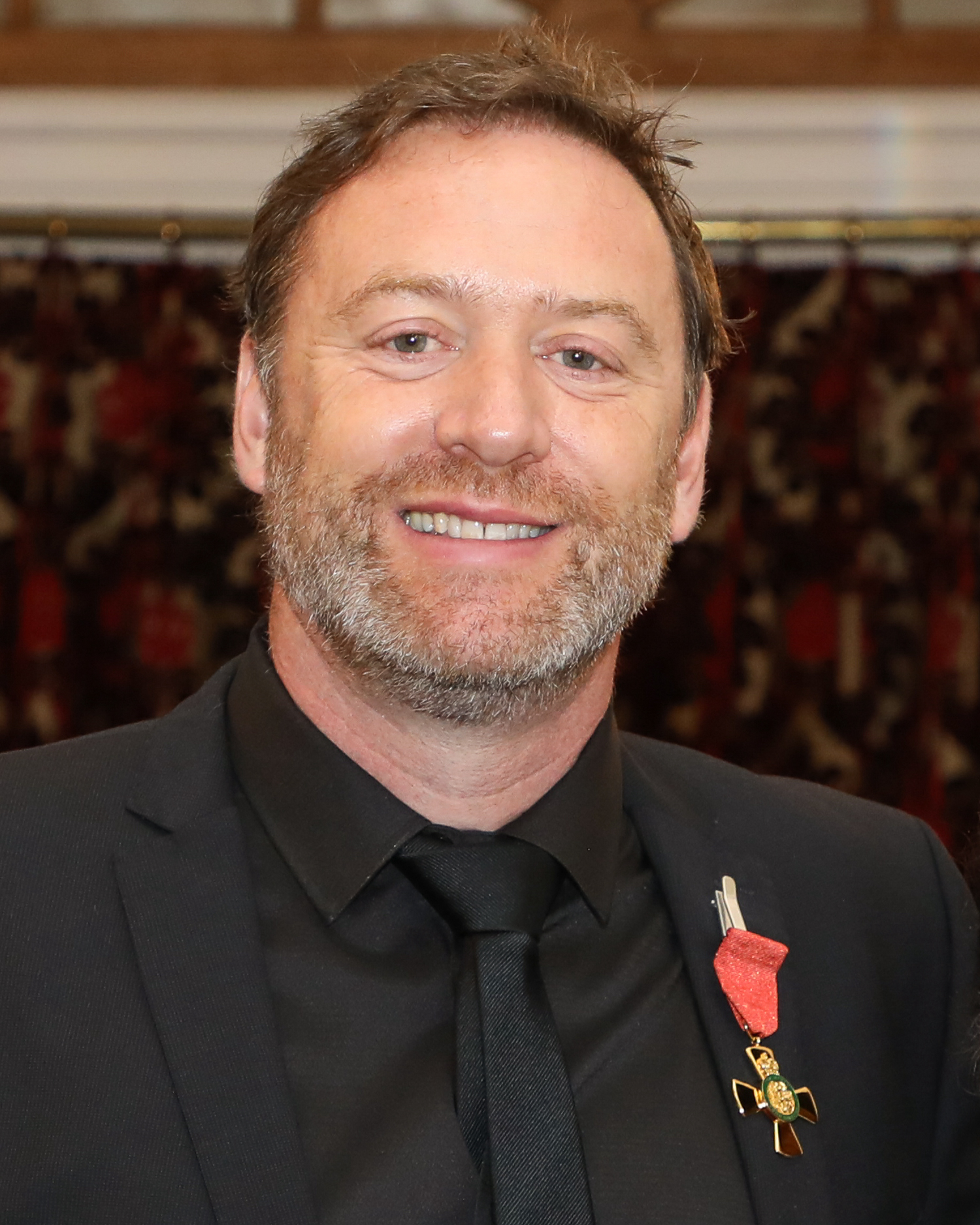
Simon Snook

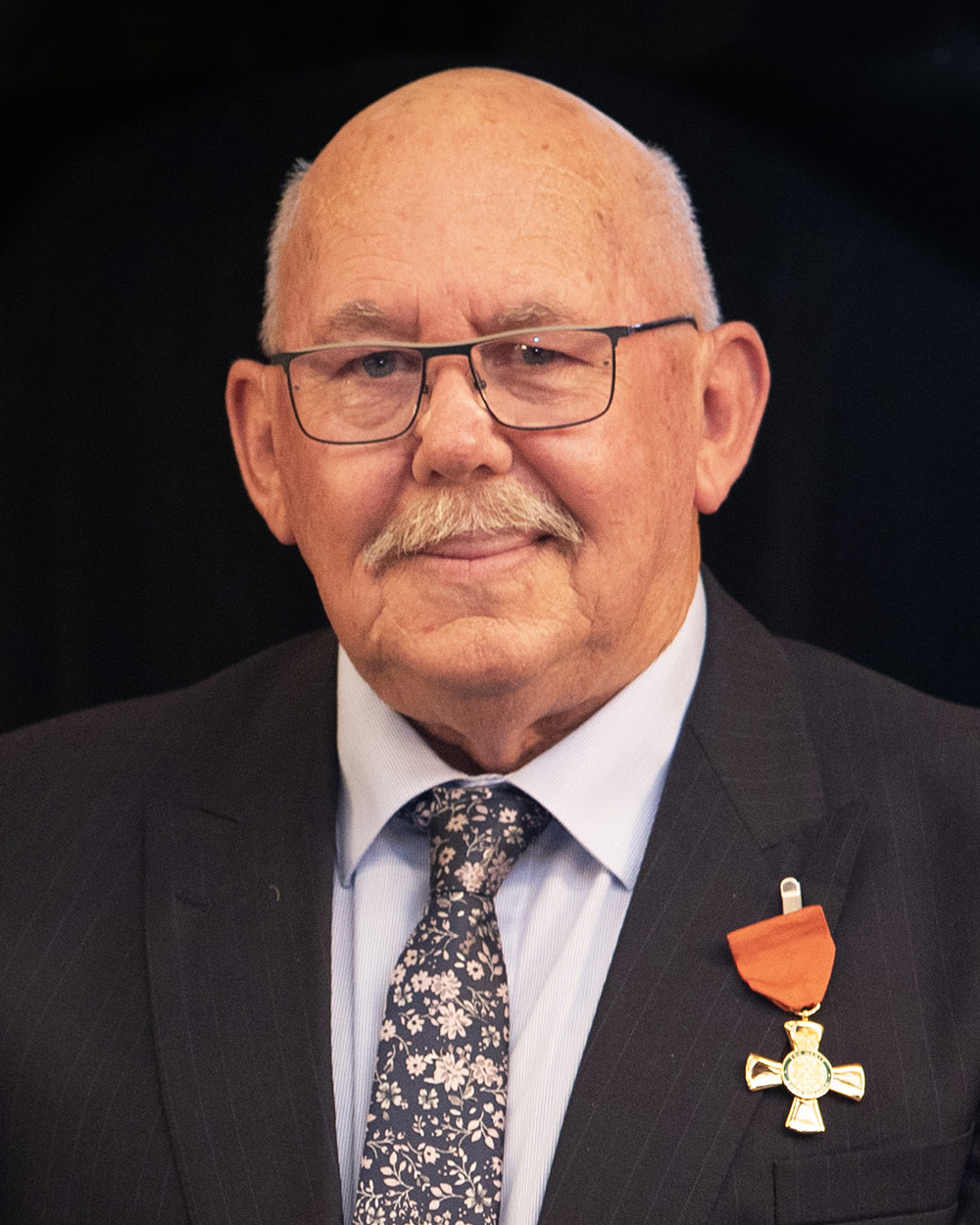
Larnce Wichman

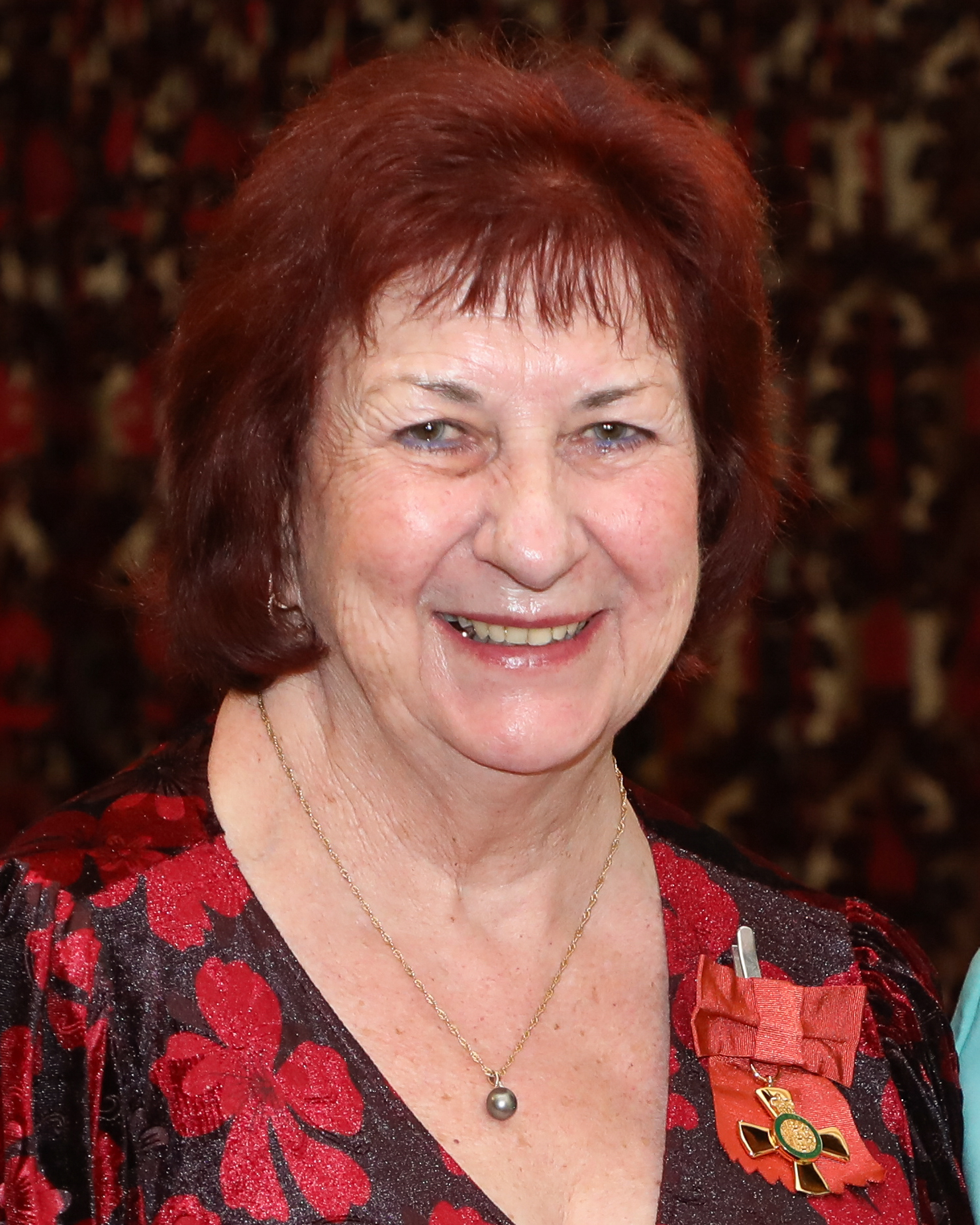
Rose Wilkinson

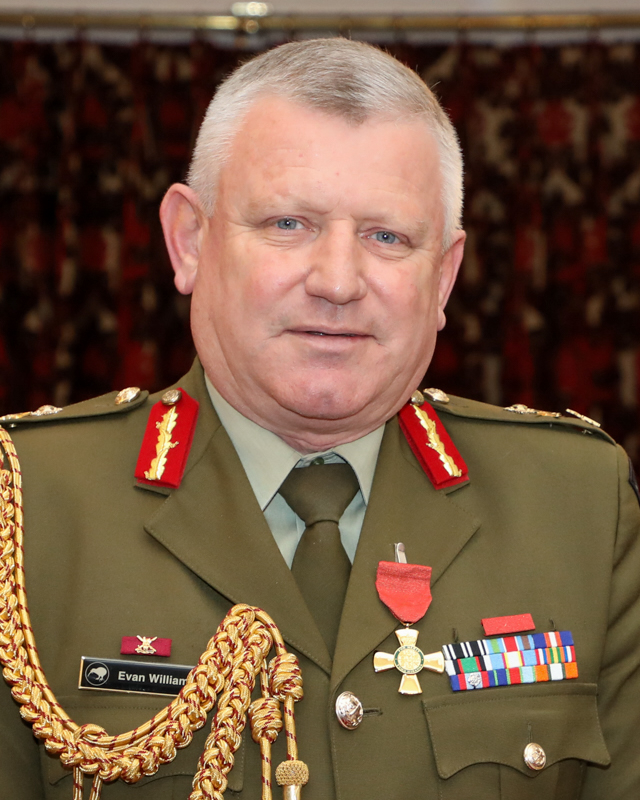
Evan Williams

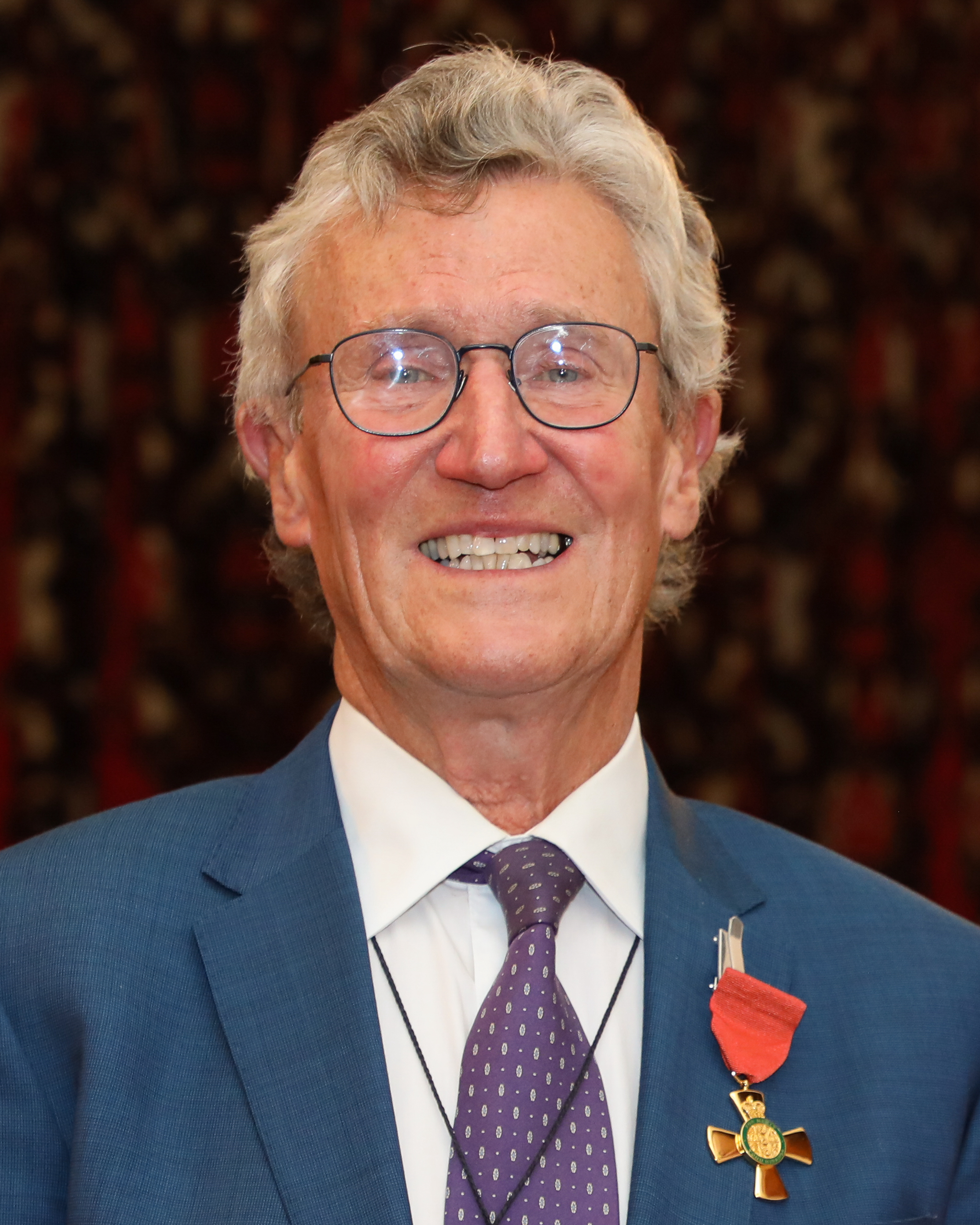
Don Wilson

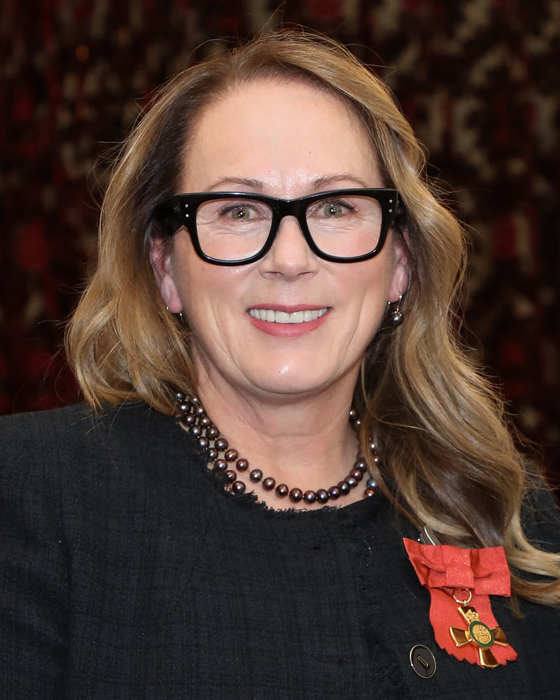
Jodi Wright

=== Member (MNZM) ===
- Harriet Bennett Allan – of Beach Haven. For services to the publishing industry.
- Margaret Louise Barrell – of Avonhead. For services as a hymn writer.
- Luke Boustridge – of Glenbrook. For services to the electrical industry and vocational training.
- Monica Jacqueline Briggs – of Orewa. For services to women and governance.
- Patrick William Brontë – of Kelvin Grove. For services to military history.
- Barbara Joan Dewson – of Whanganui East. For services to dental and oral health therapy.
- Carla Elena Donson – of Whanganui. For services to women and the community.
- Aaron Murray Fleming – of Jacks Point. For services to the community and sport.
- Tevita Filisonu’u Funaki – of Massey. For services to Pacific health.
- Robert Lawrence Gemmell – of Picton. For services to martial arts and the community.
- Pamela Mary Hanna – of Petone. For services to the community and early childhood education.
- Roslyn Aileen Hiini – of Glenfield. For services to women and the union movement.
- Phillip Terence Humphreys – of Kaiapoi. For services to people with disabilities and sport.
- Christine Mary Hundleby – of Newlands. For services to Pacific arts.
- Richard Geoffrey Keddell – of Tauranga. For services to orthopaedics.
- Trevor John Kempton – of Mosgiel. For services to the arts and local government.
- Julie Ann King – of Bluff Hill. For services to education.
- Joan Knight – of Beach Haven. For services to the environment.
- Patricia Jacqueline Knight – of Blockhouse Bay. For services to Lepidoptera conservation and the community.
- Philippa Agnes Laufiso – of Macandrew Bay. For services to the arts and the community.
- Vivien Lynette Heretaniwha Lee – of Takanini. For services to prisoner support and Māori.
- Tupe Lualua – of Ōwhiro Bay. For services to the arts.
- Huhana Te Uru Naomi Anne Manu – of Hokowhitu. For services to STEM education and Māori.
- Aych Carlin McArdle – of Point Chevalier. For services to the rainbow community.
- Pearl Naulder – of Cloverlea. For services to education.
- Aaron Roger Nicholson – of Wānaka. For services to the New Zealand Police and Search and Rescue.
- Dinah Jane Okeby – of Highbury. For services to the public service.
- Kahira Rata Patricia Olley – of Ōwhata. For services to women, youth and the prevention of family violence.
- Ria Dawn Percival – of Welwyn Garden City, United Kingdom. For services to football.
- Dr Anne Doloras Perera – of St Johns. For services to food science and nutrition.
- Anuradha Ramkumar – of Green Bay. For services to Indian classical dance.
- Paul William James Reti – of Pegasus. For services to jujitsu.
- Alexandra Lowe Riley – of Woodland Hills, California, US. For services to football.
- Lemalu Silao Vaisola-Sefo – of Papakura. For services to Pacific health.
- Susan Jane Sinclair – of Masterton. For services to art and education.
- Prem Singh – of Broadmeadows. For services to multicultural communities.
- Harold Edgar Spark – of Paekākāriki. For services to railway unions.
- The Honourable Maryan Street – of Hataitai. For services as a member of Parliament and to human and democratic rights.
- Dr Tamasailau Suaalii-Sauni – of Takanini. For services to education.
- Yvonne Lenette Sue – of Ohakune. For services to health and Māori.
- Joyce Alma Talbot – of Mount Eden. For services to sailing administration.
- Professor Yvonne Jasmine Te Ruki Rangi o Tangaroa Underhill – of Westmere. For services to tertiary education and Pacific development.
- Vaosa ole Tagaloa Makerita Urale – of Oriental Bay. For services to Pacific arts.
- Tama-o-Rangi Waipara – of Elgin. For services to Māori music.
- David John West – of Ashburton. For services to community development.
- Diane Christine Wilson – of Bulls. For services to the Royal New Zealand Returned and Services Association.
- Senior Sergeant Karl Edwin Rostance Wilson – of Papakura. For services to the New Zealand Police, disaster victim identification and Search and Rescue.
- Lindsay Macdonald Wood – of Nelson. For services to environmental sustainability and climate change awareness.

Honorary

- İsmail Kaşdemir – of Çanakkale, Türkiye. For services to New Zealand–Türkiye relations.
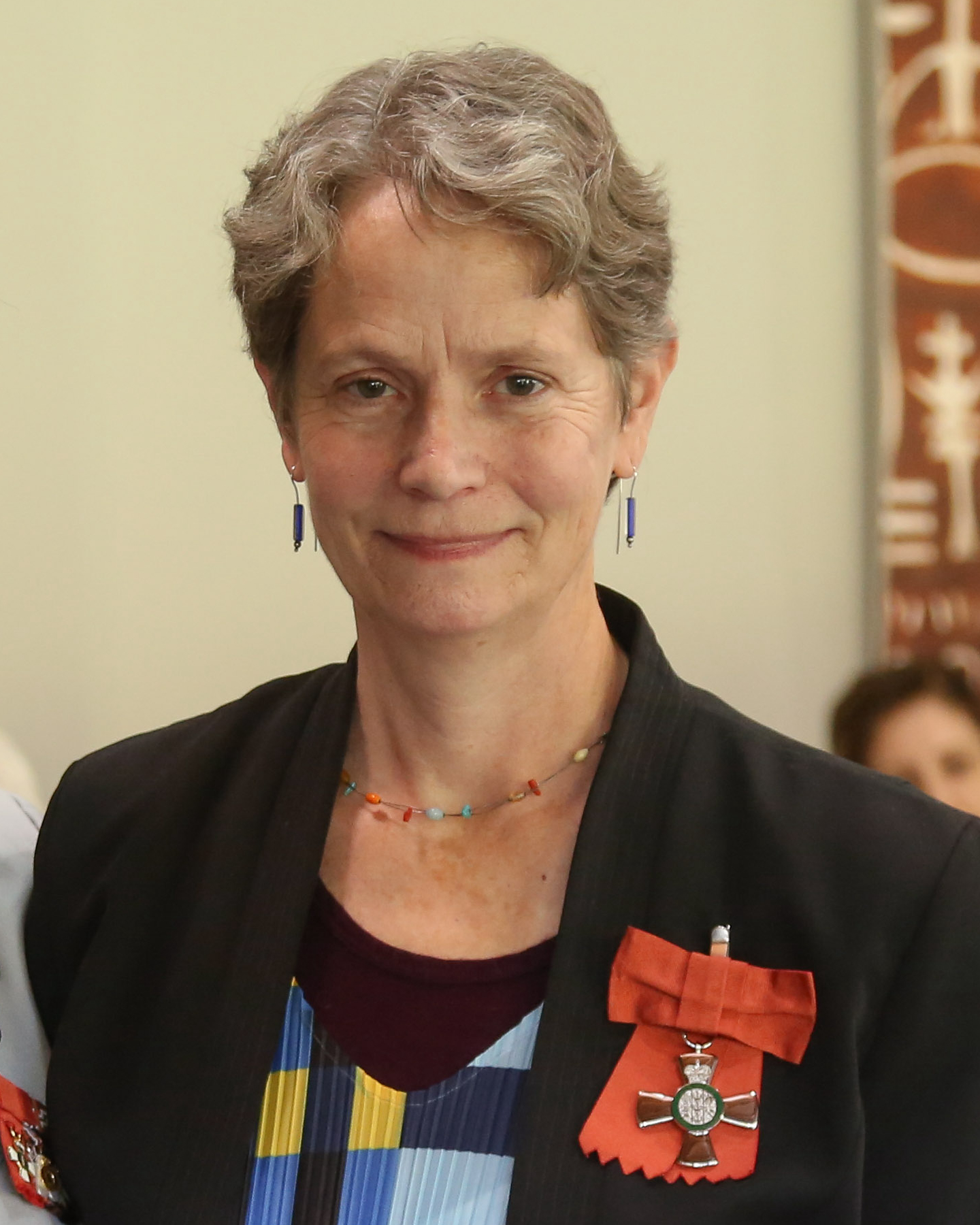
Harriet Allan

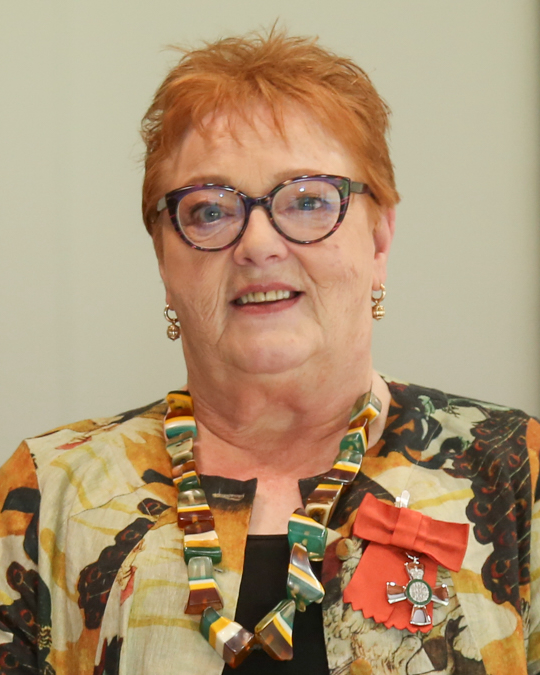
Marnie Barrell

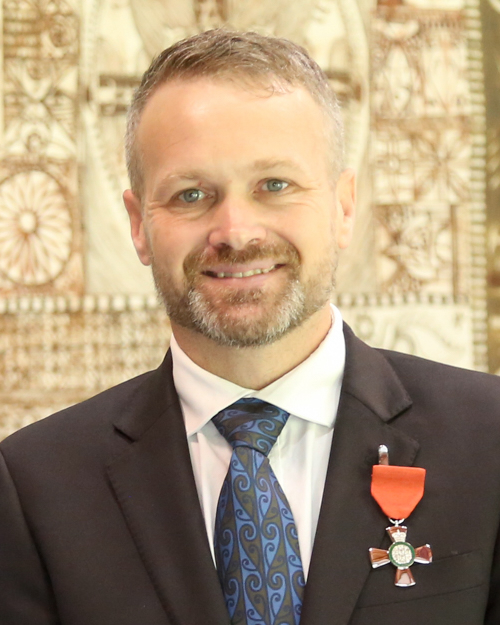
Luke Boustridge

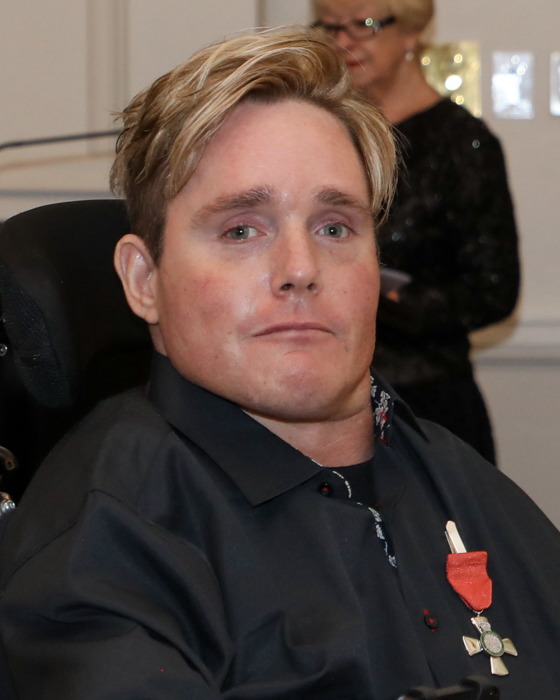
Patrick Brontë

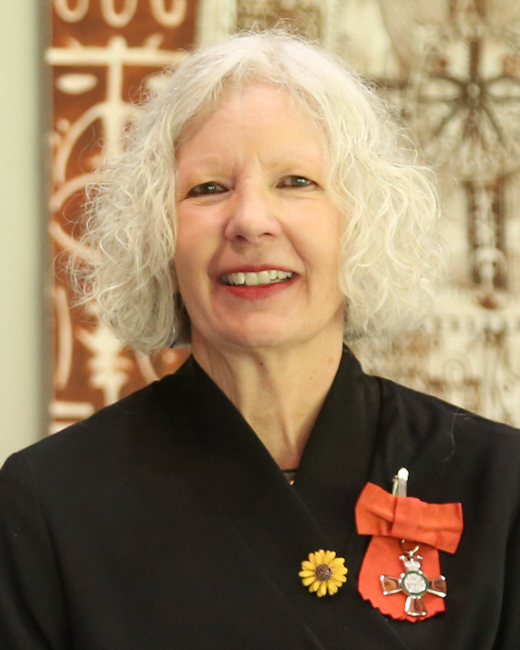
Monica Briggs

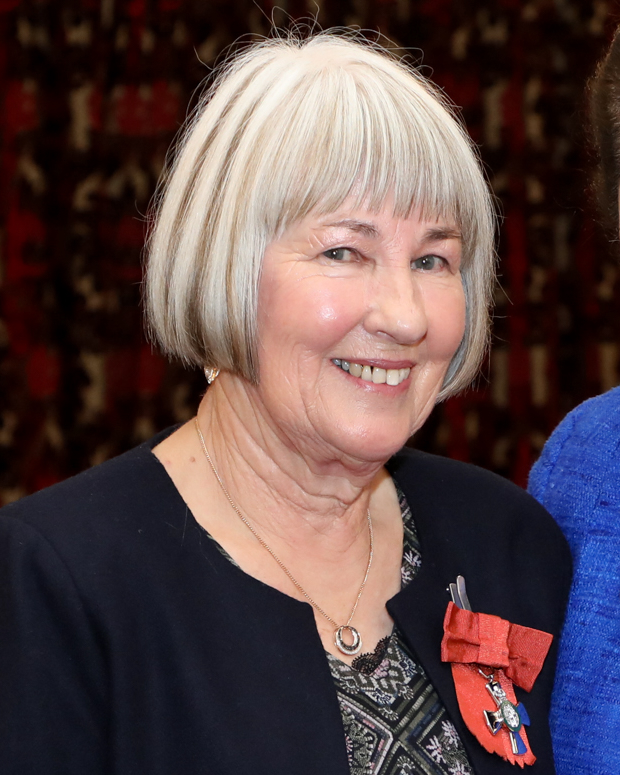
Barbara Dewson

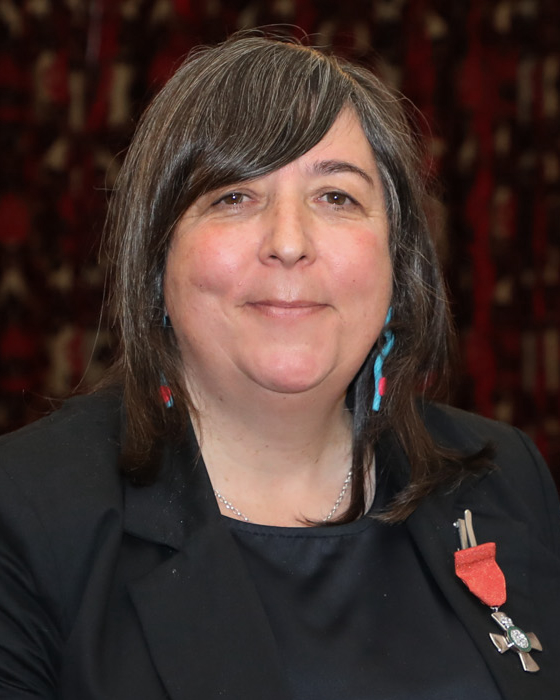
Carla Donson

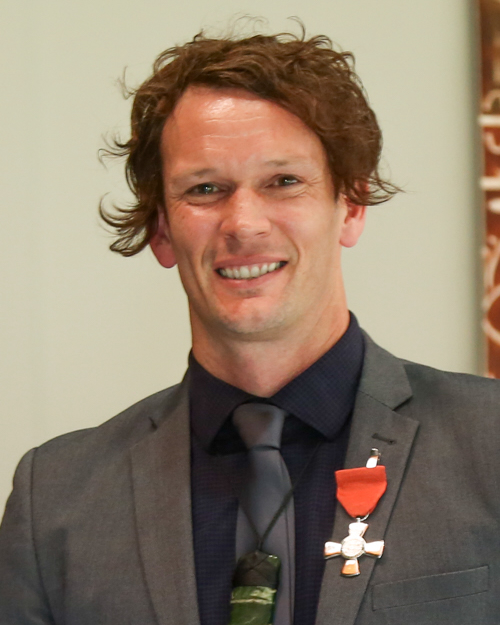
Aaron Fleming

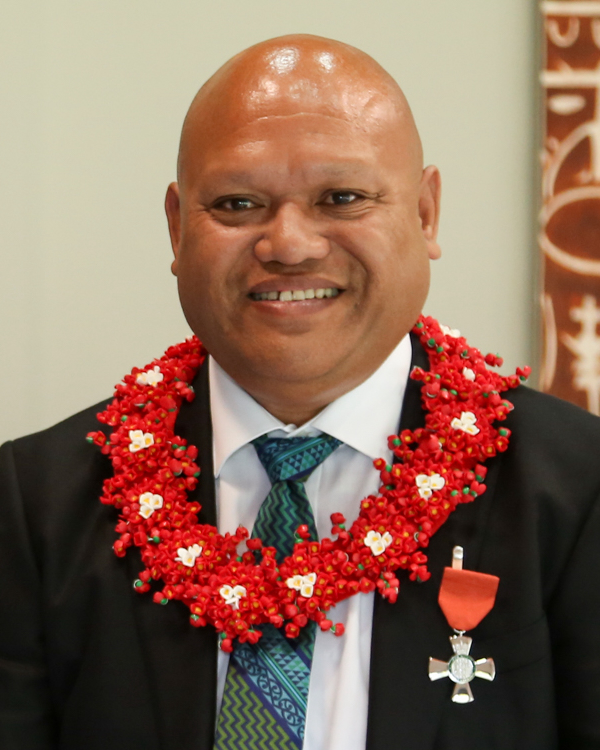
Tevita Funaki

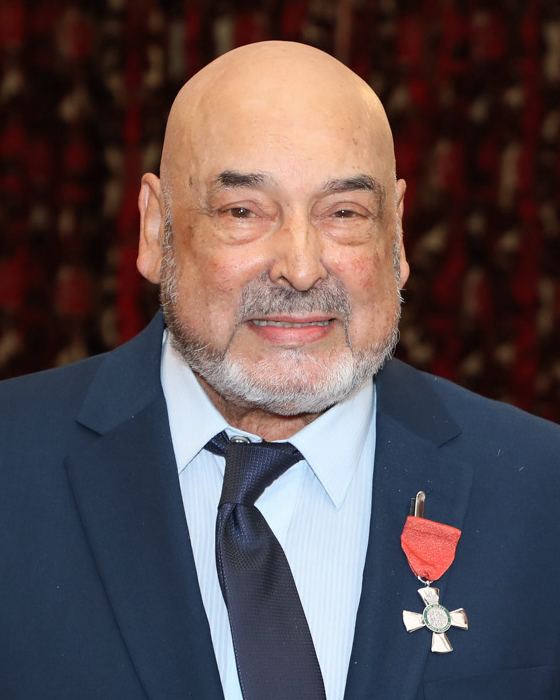
Robert Gemmell

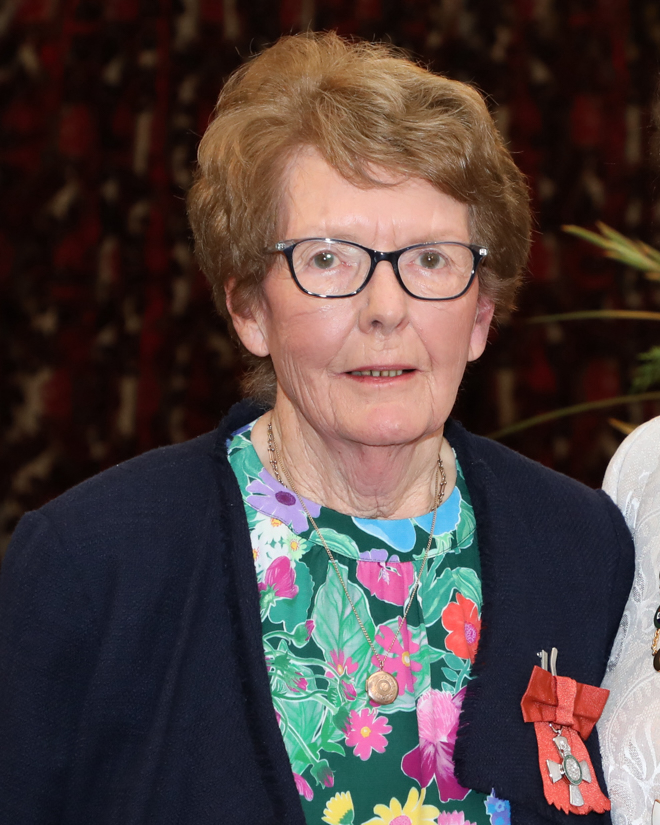
Pam Hanna

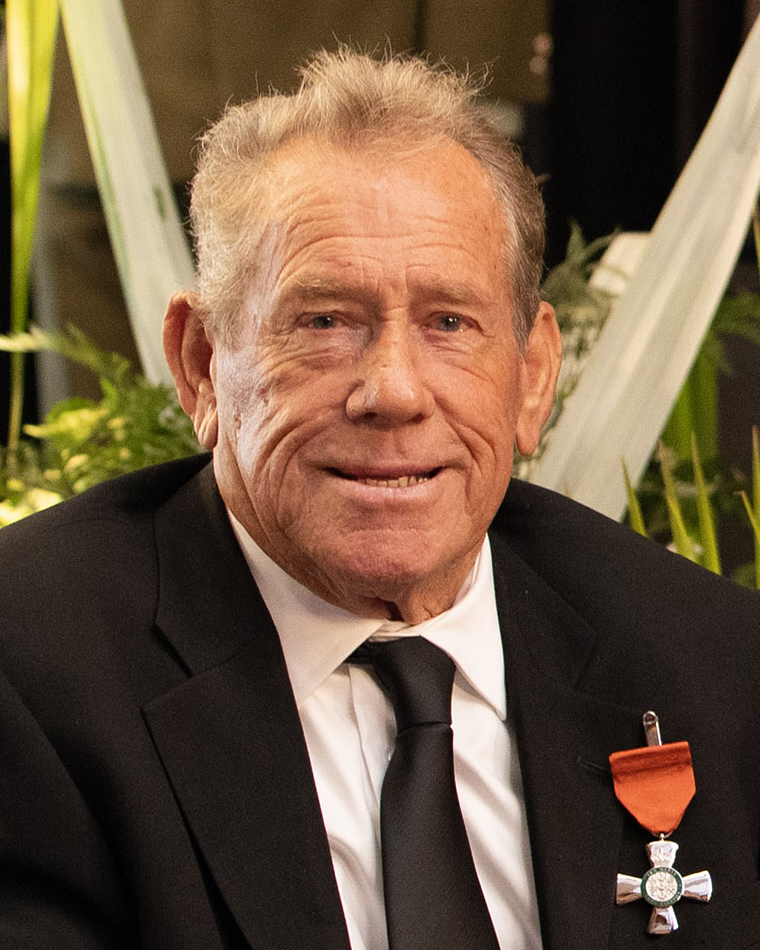
Phil Humphreys

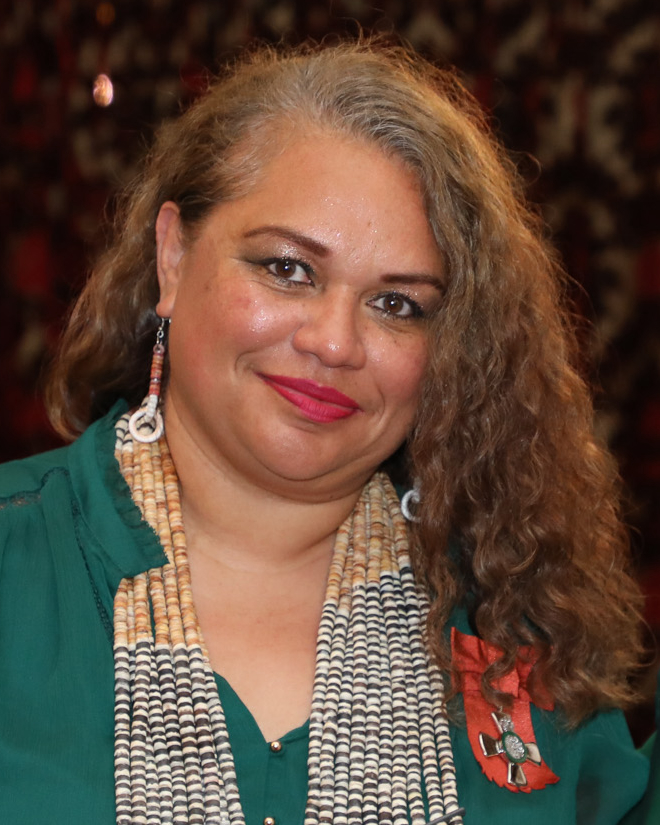
Kira Hundleby

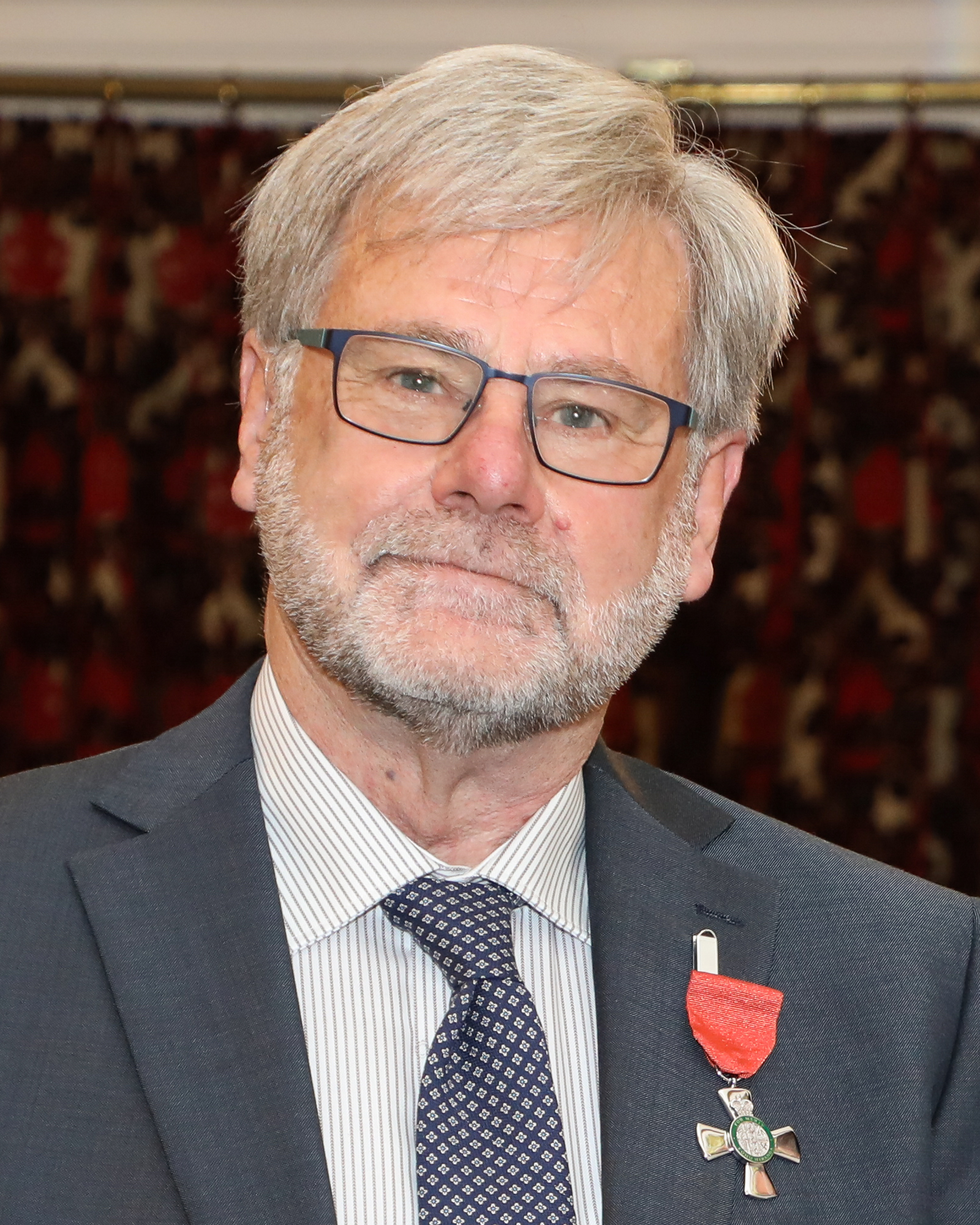
Trevor Kempton

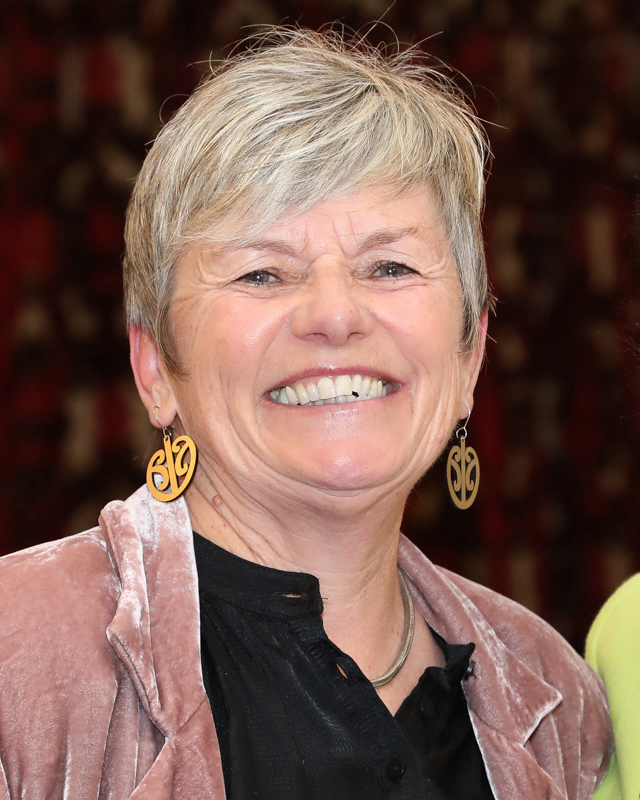
Julie King

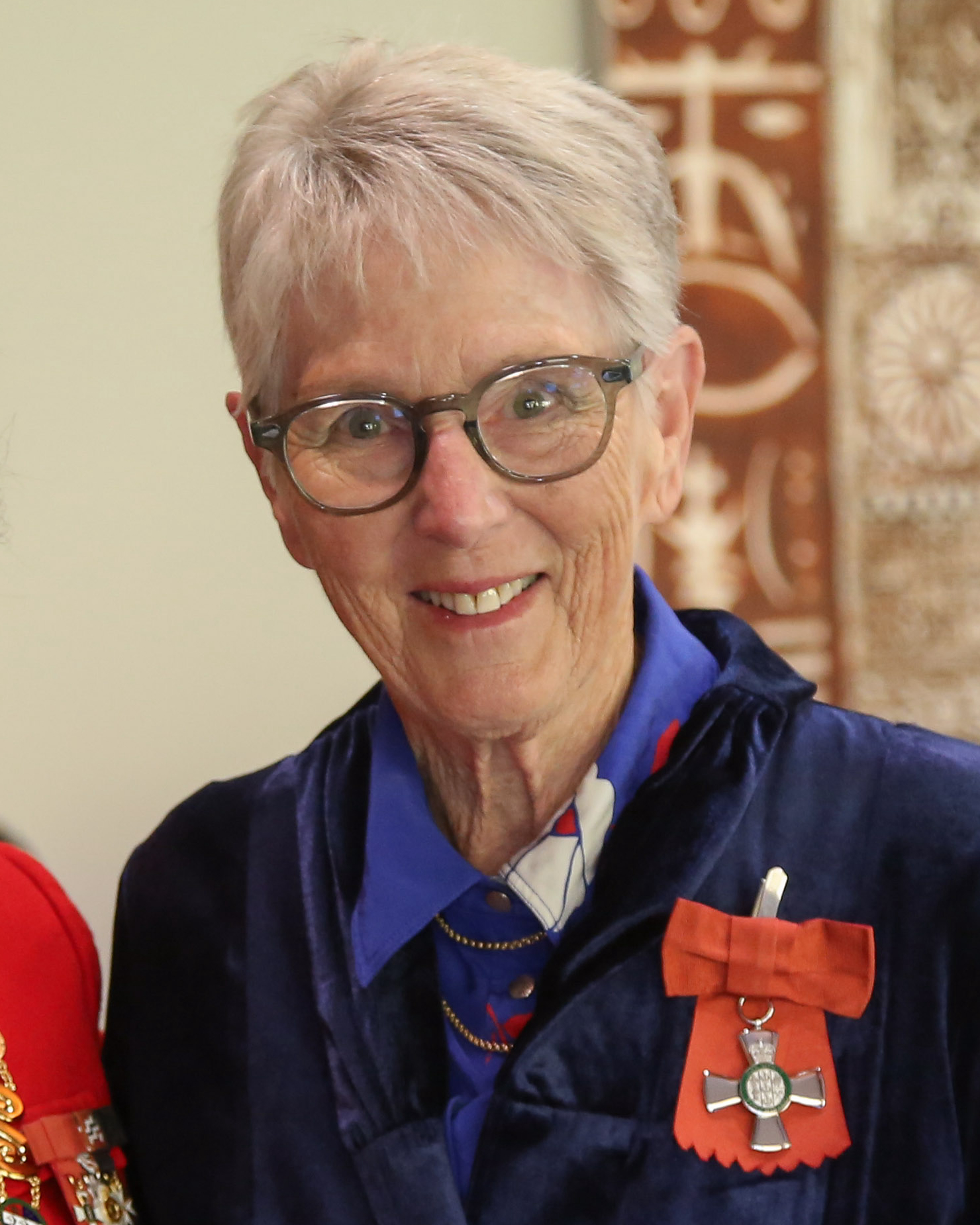
Jo Knight

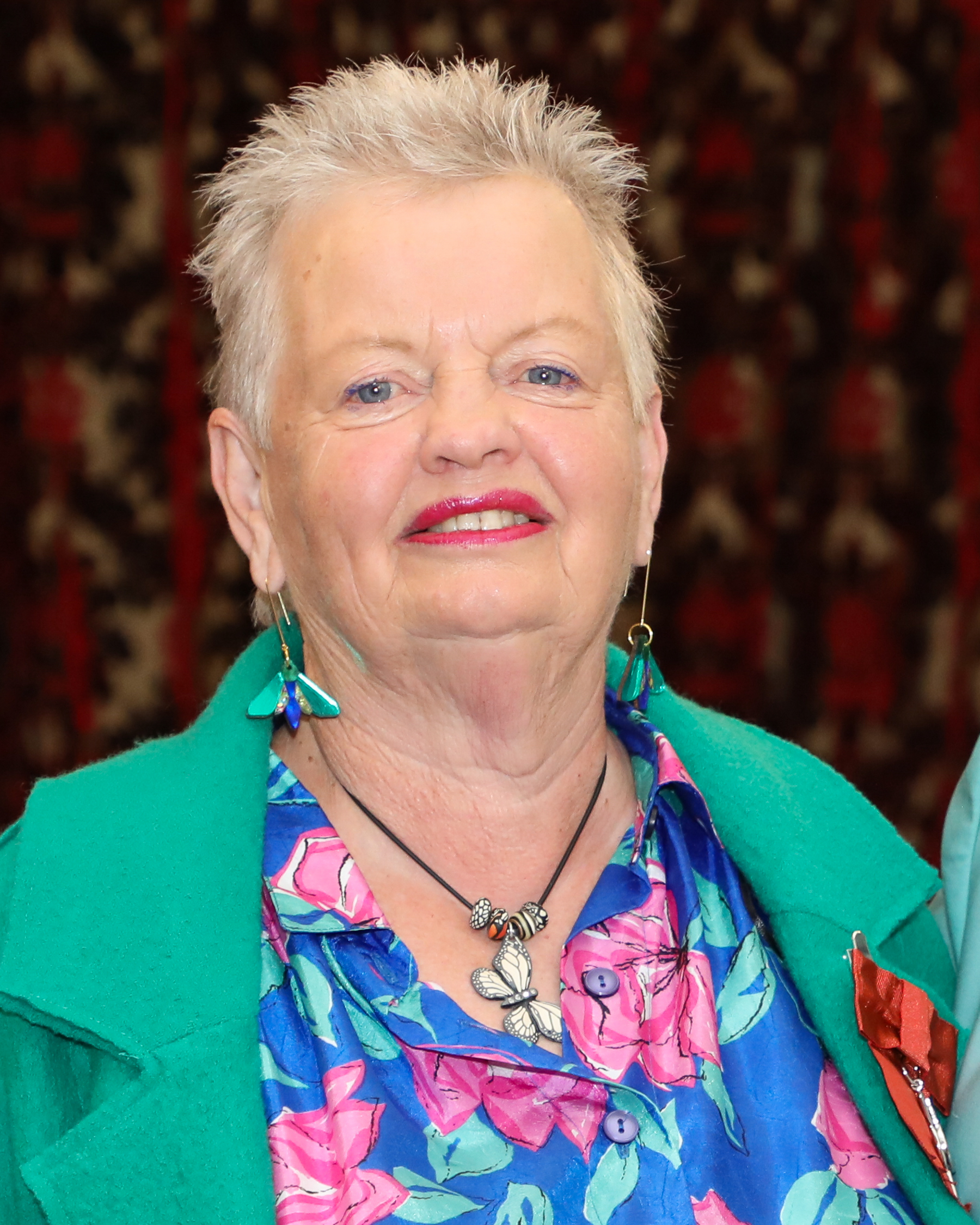
Jacqui Knight

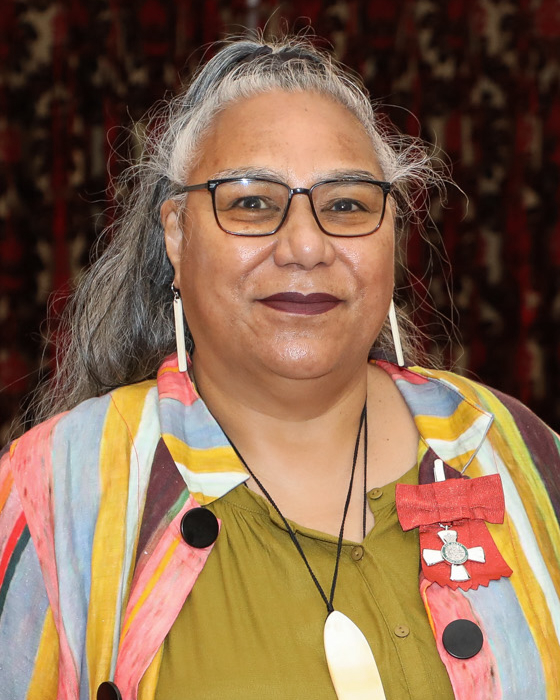
Pip Laufiso

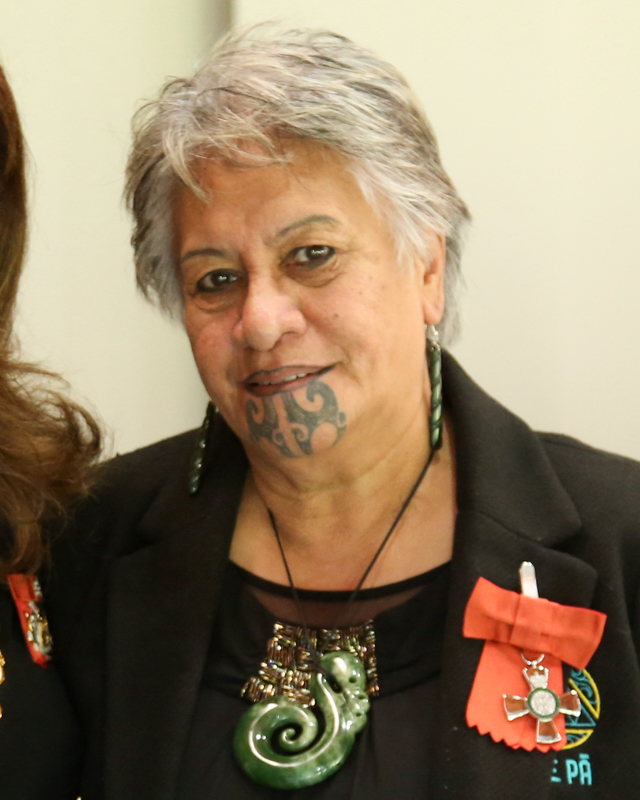
Heretaniwha Lee

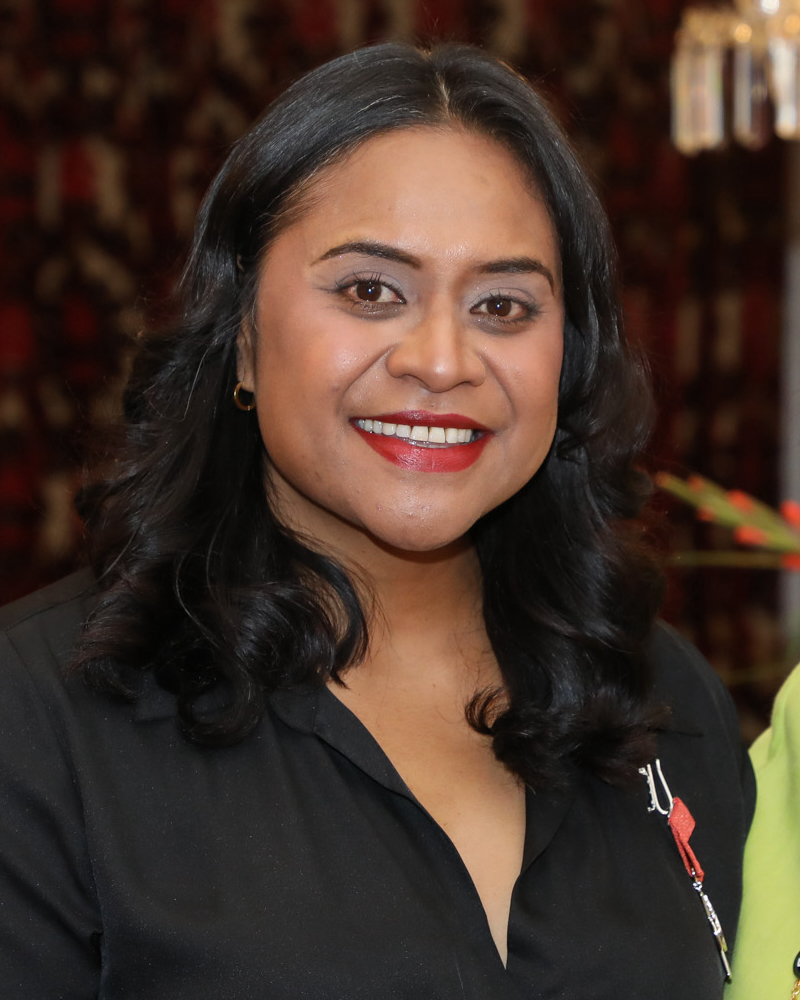
Tupe Lualua

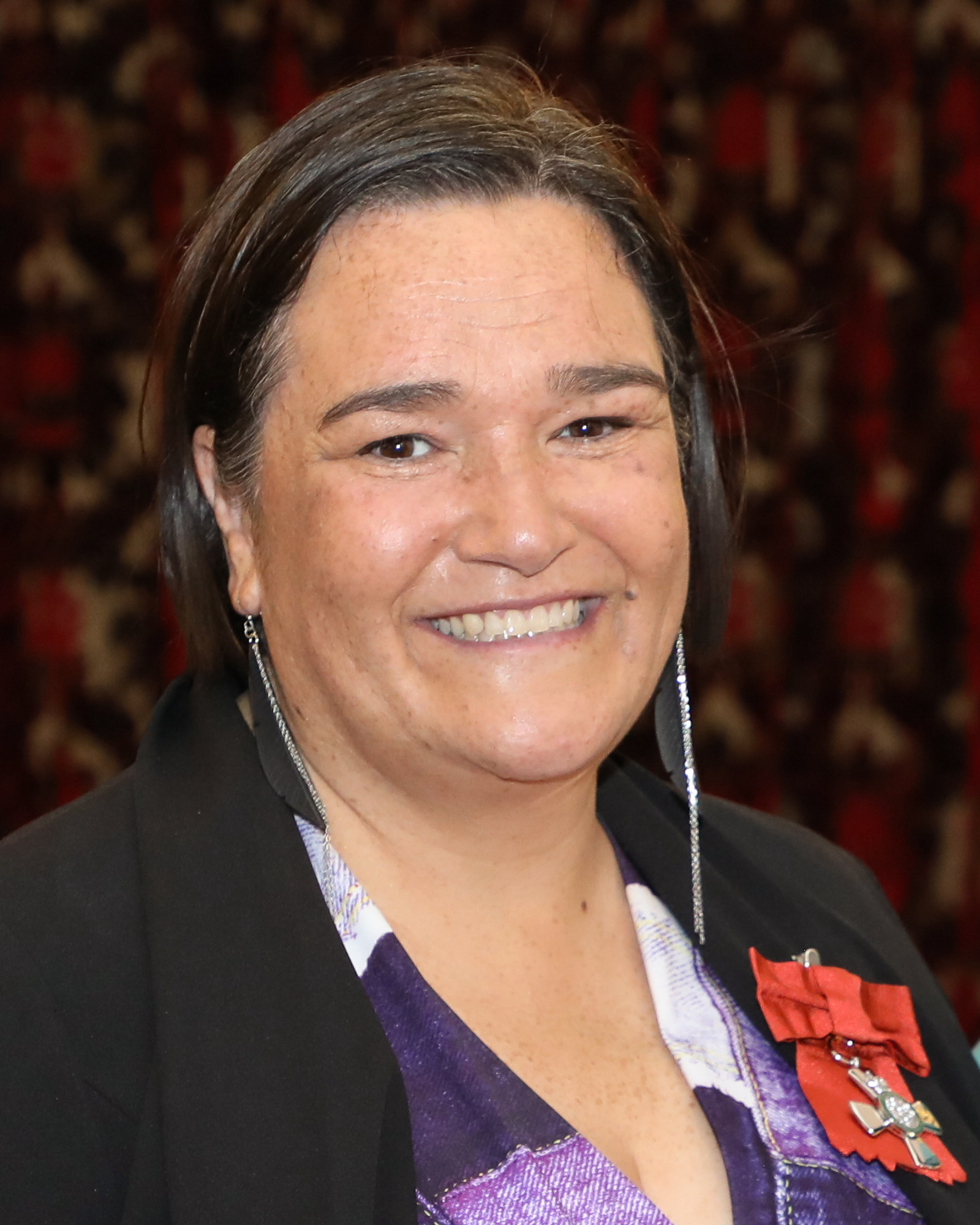
Naomi Manu

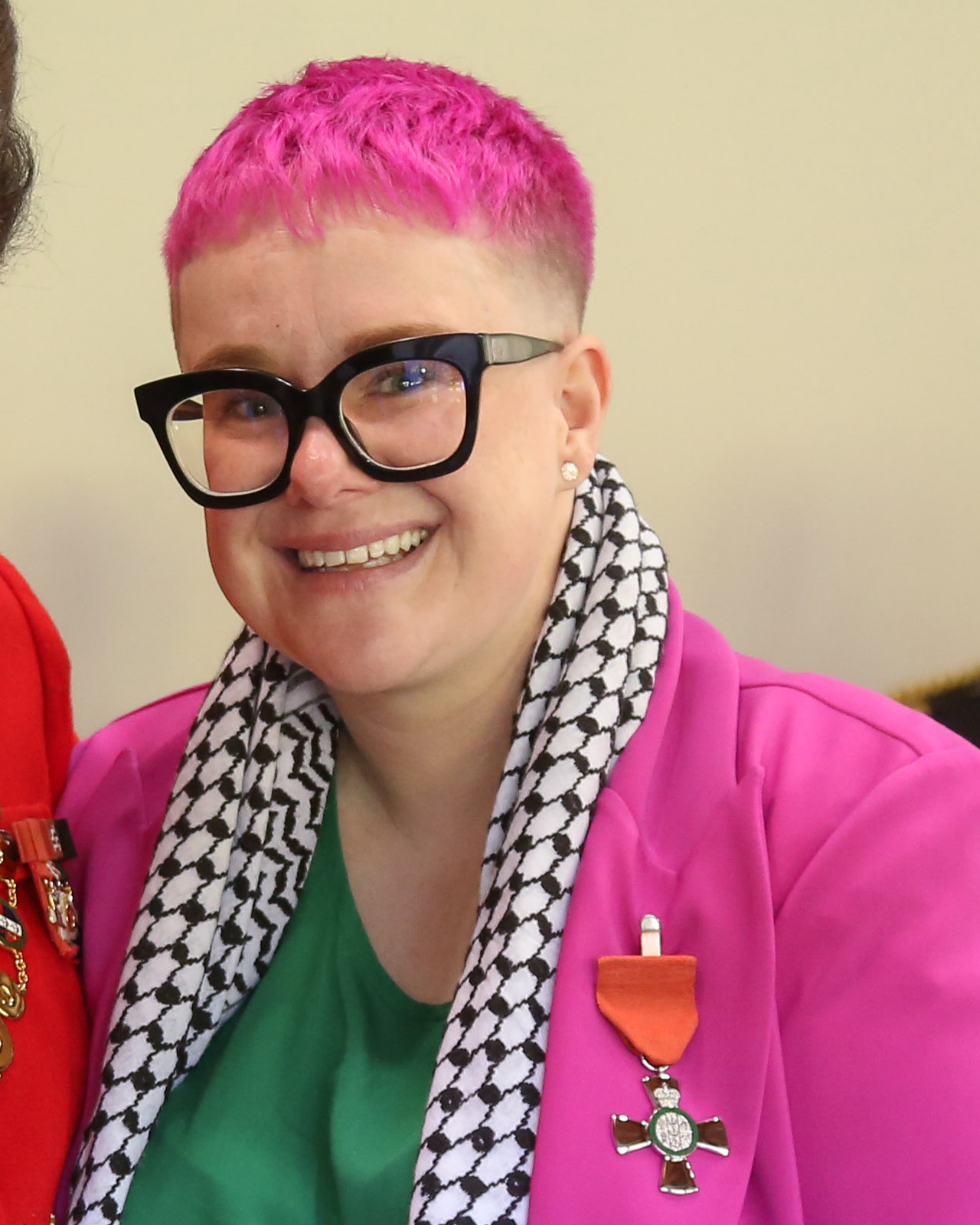
Aych McArdle

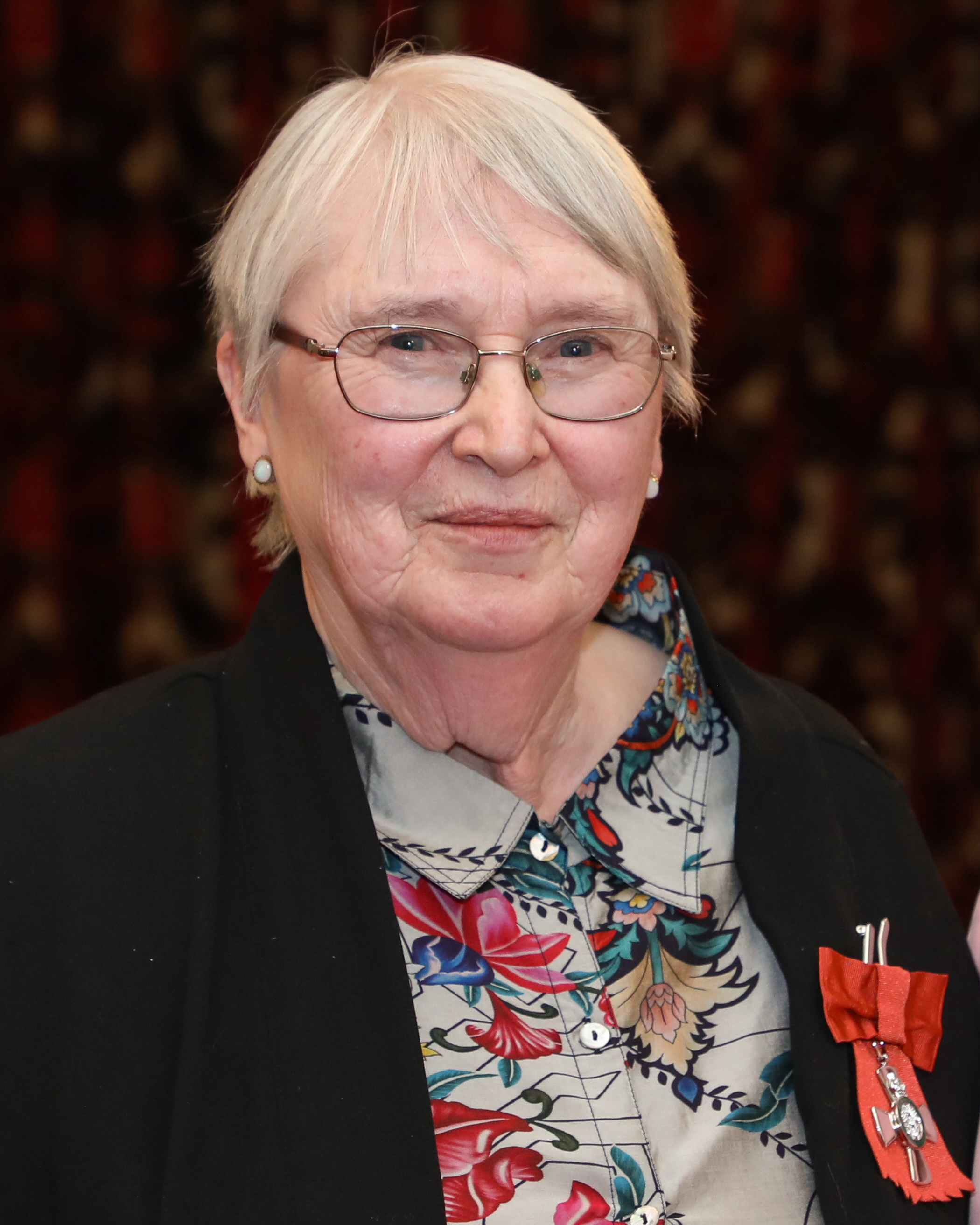
Pearl Naulder

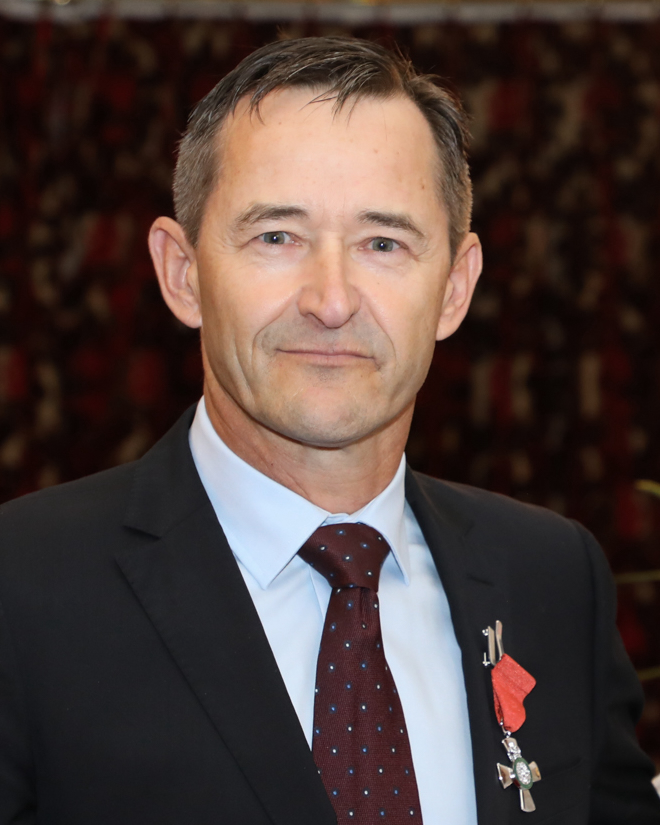
Aaron Nicholson

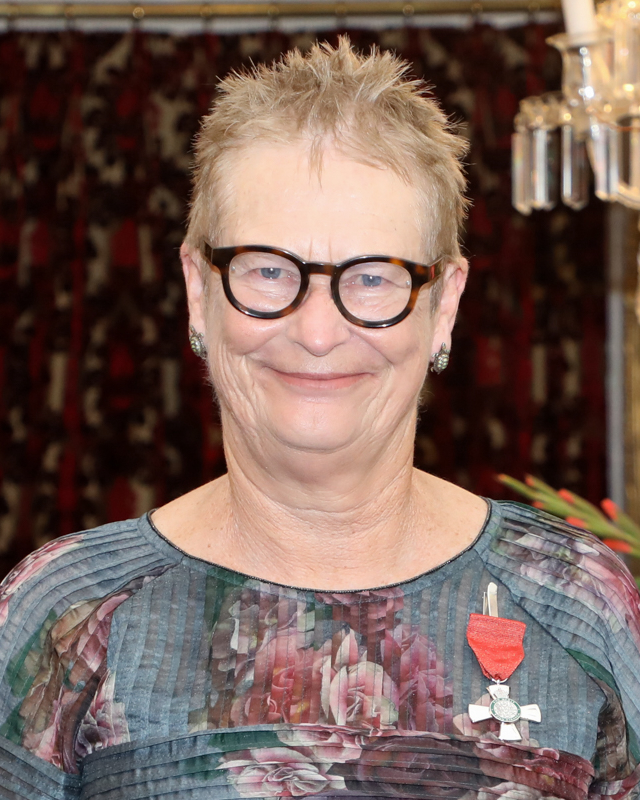
Dinah Okeby

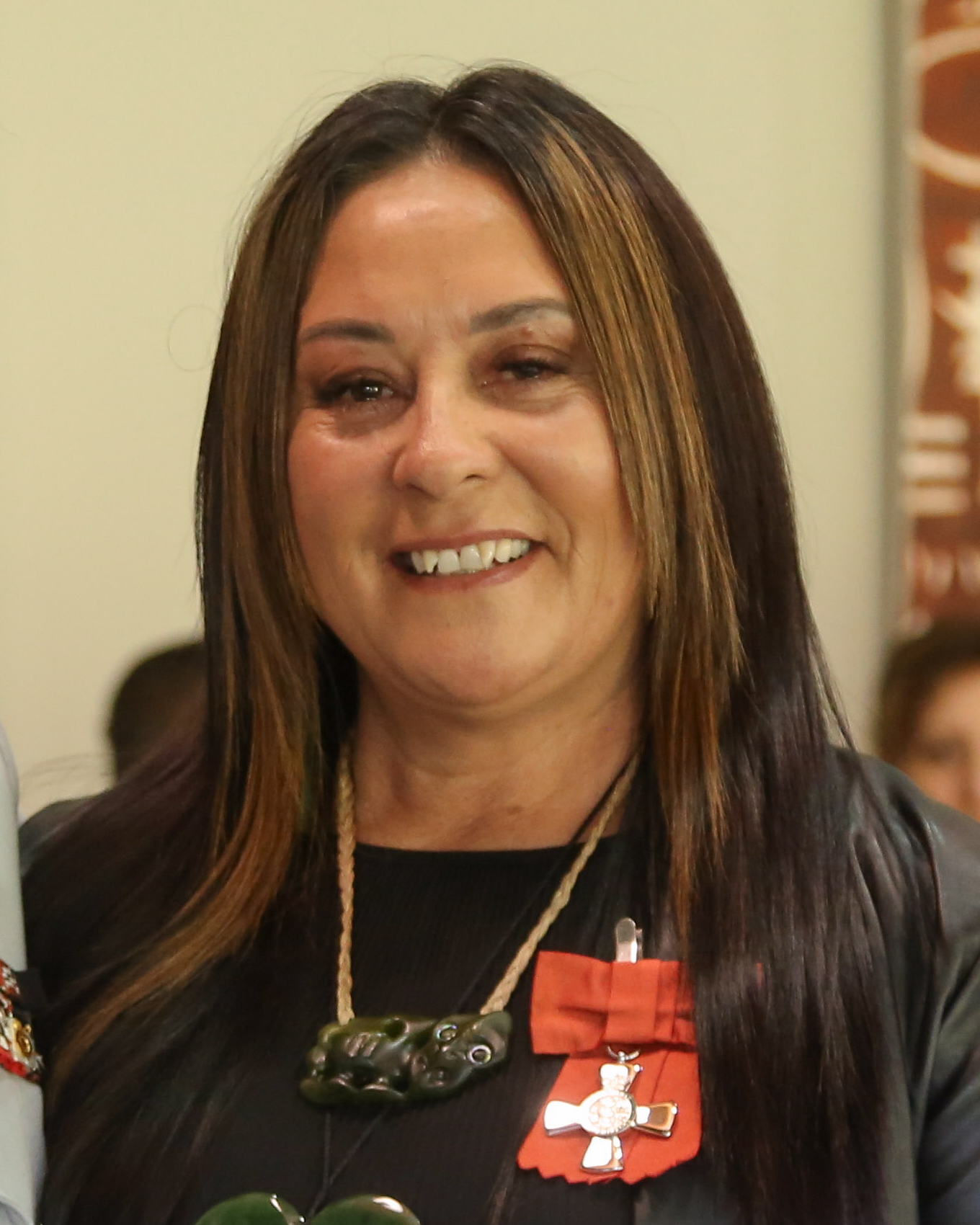
Kahira Olley

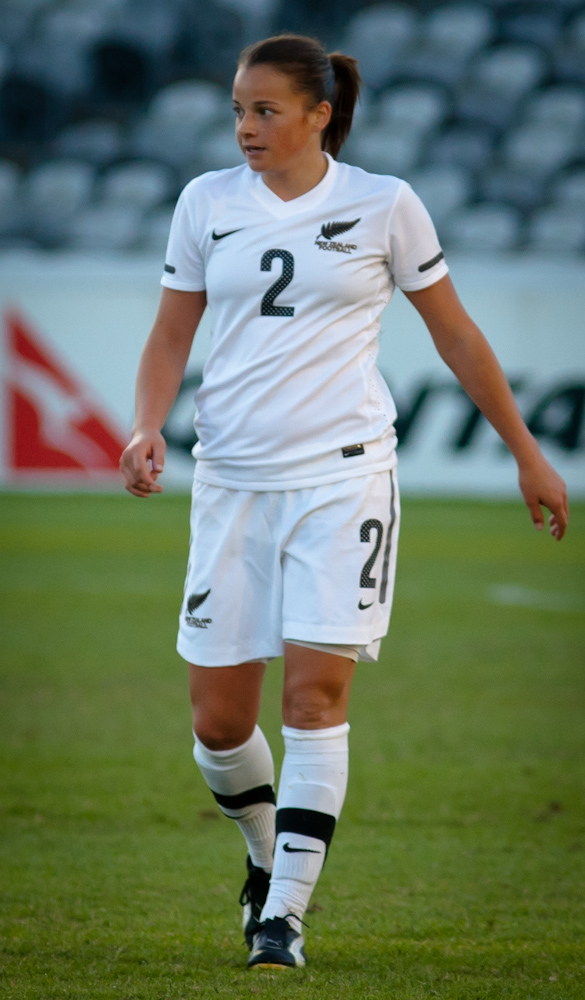
Ria Percival

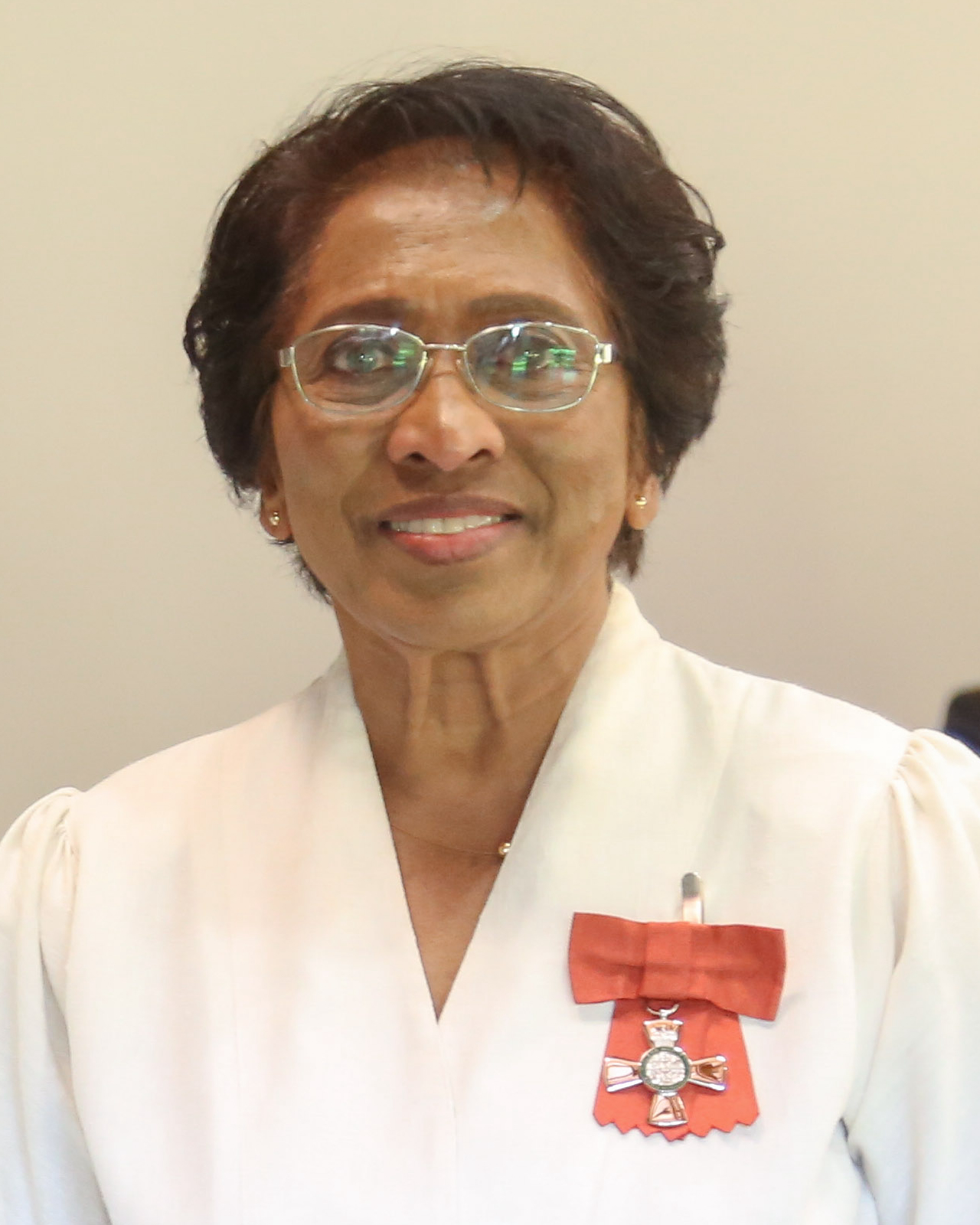
Anne Perera

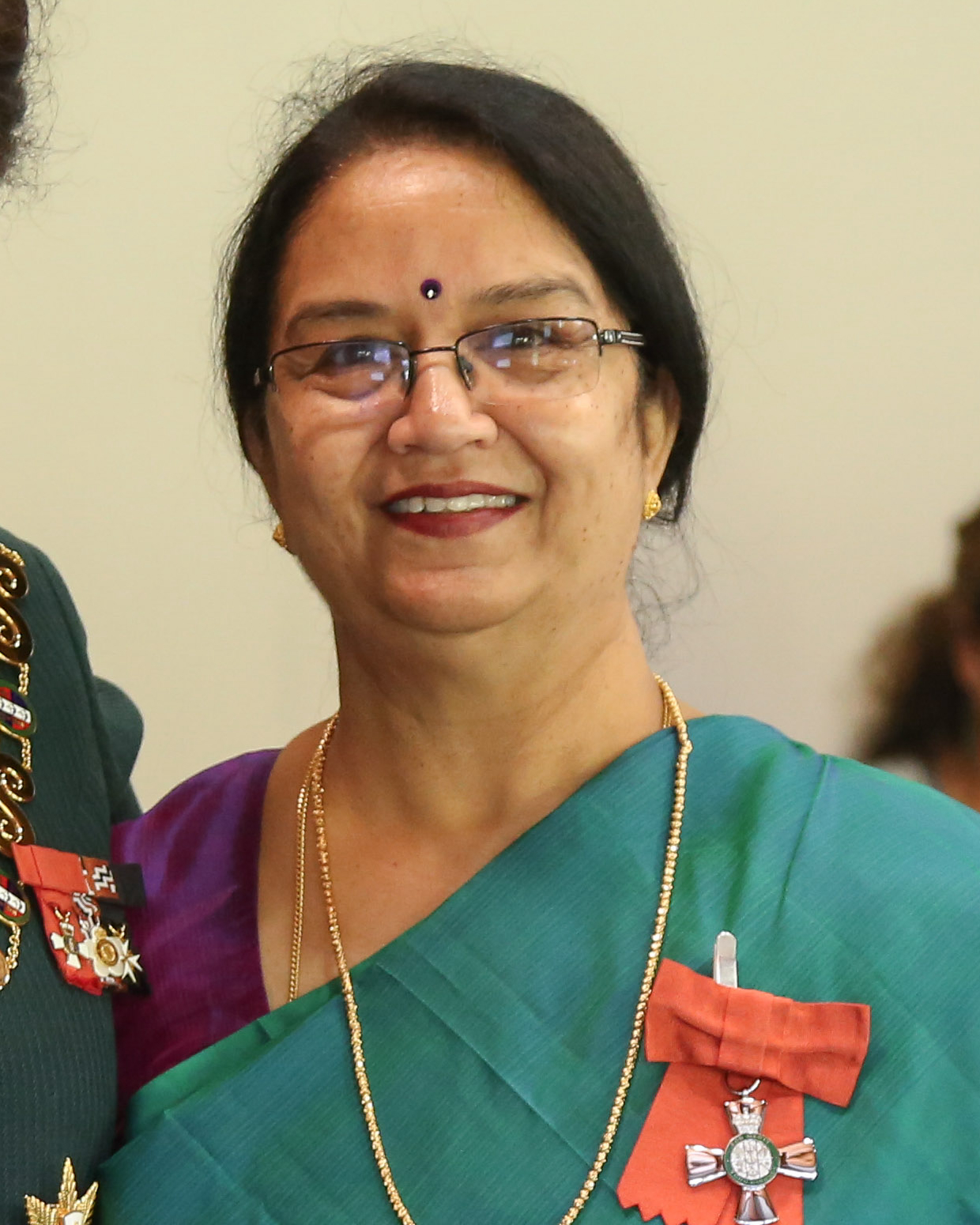
Anuradha Ramkumar

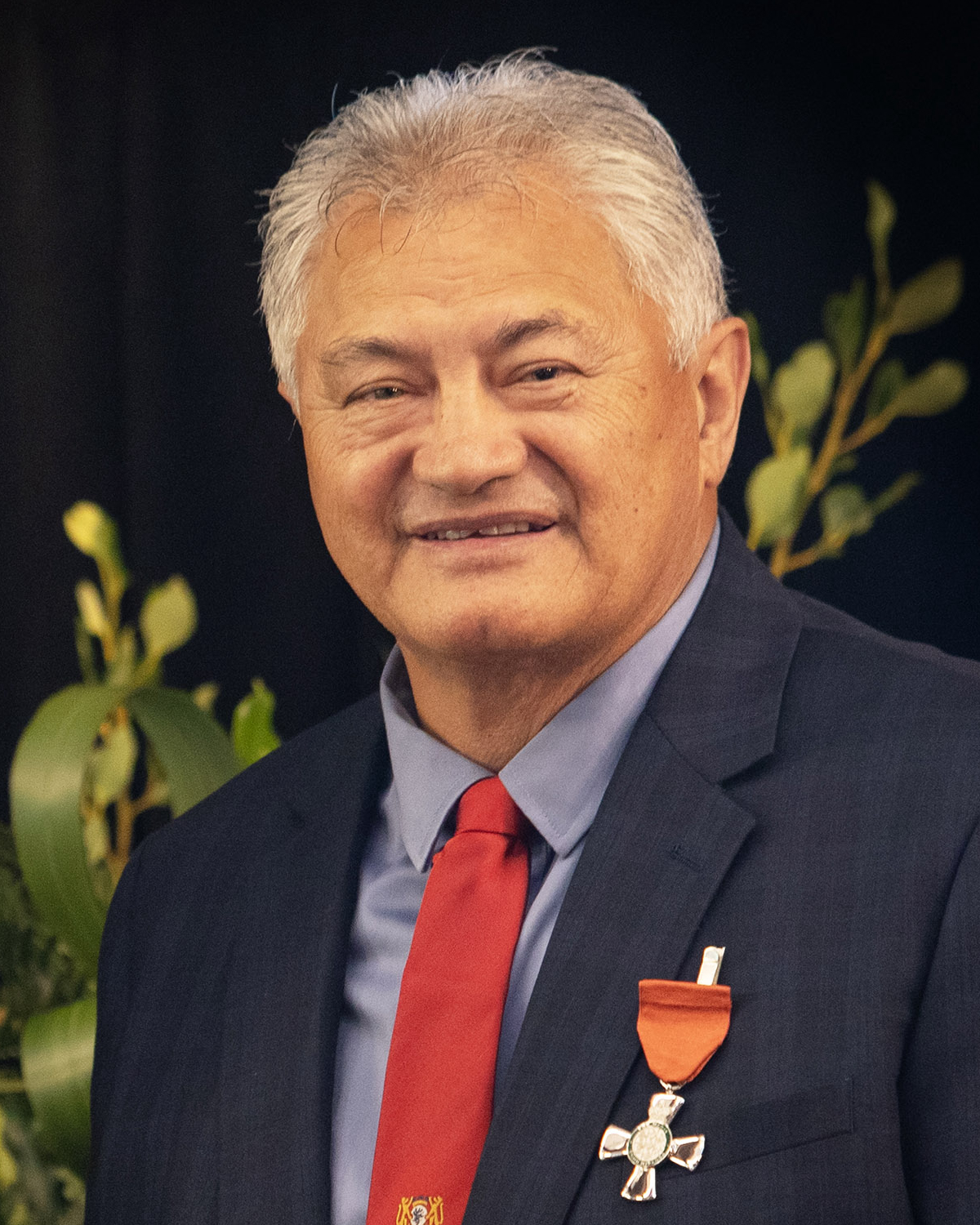
Paul Reti

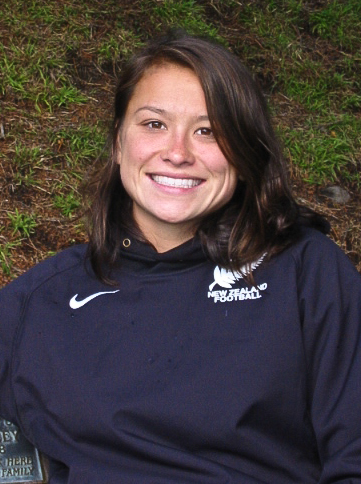
Ali Riley

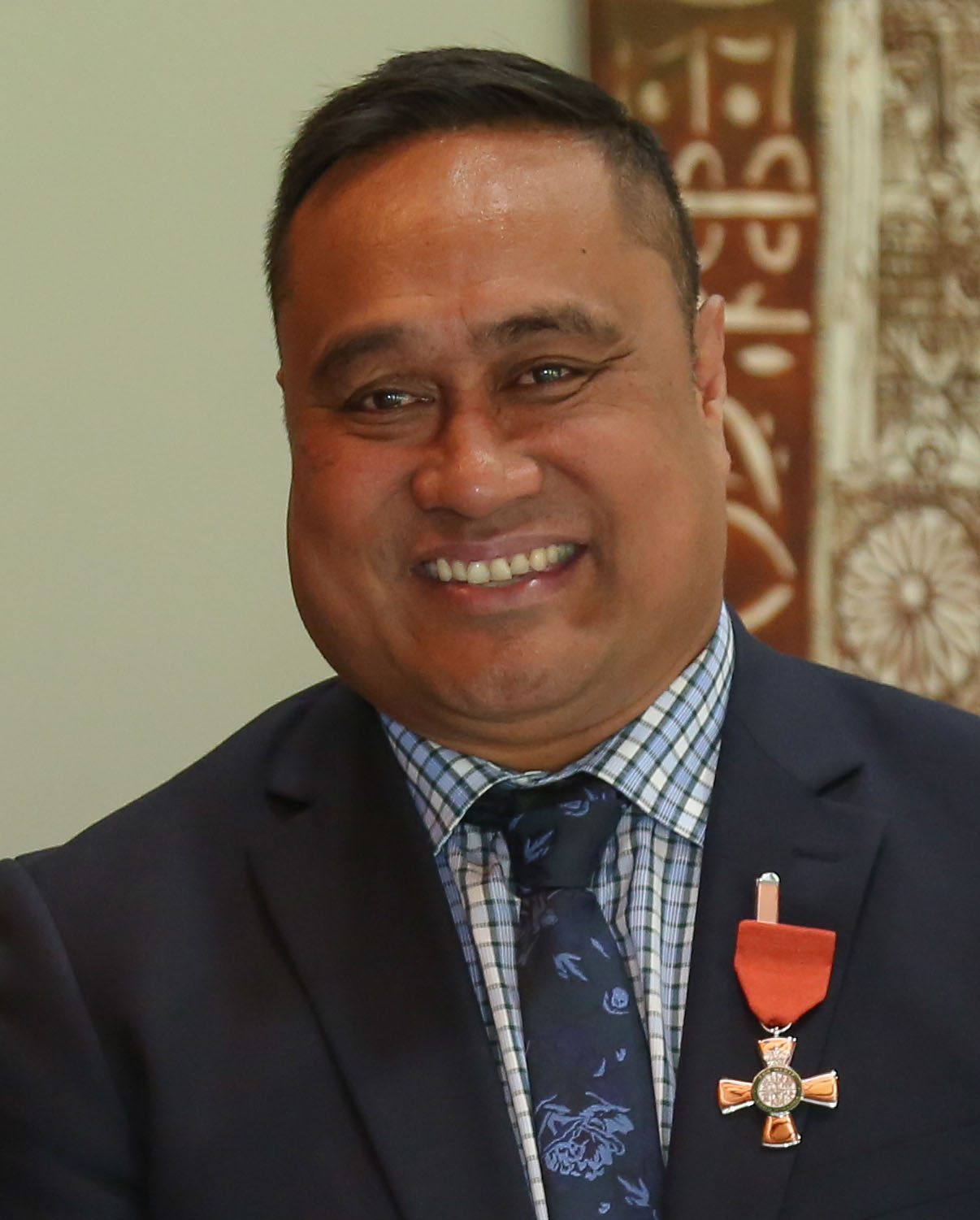
Silao Sefo

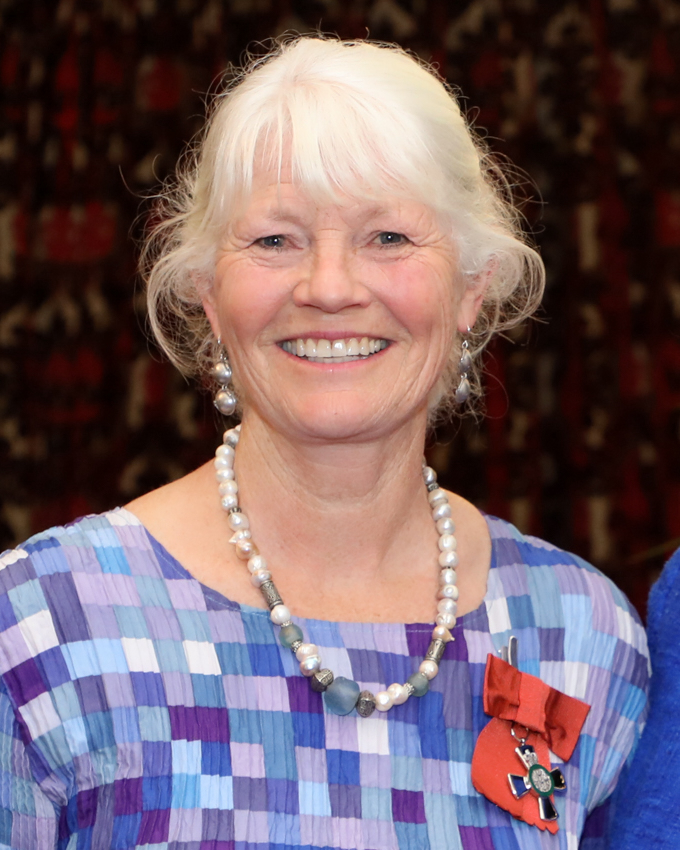
Jane Sinclair

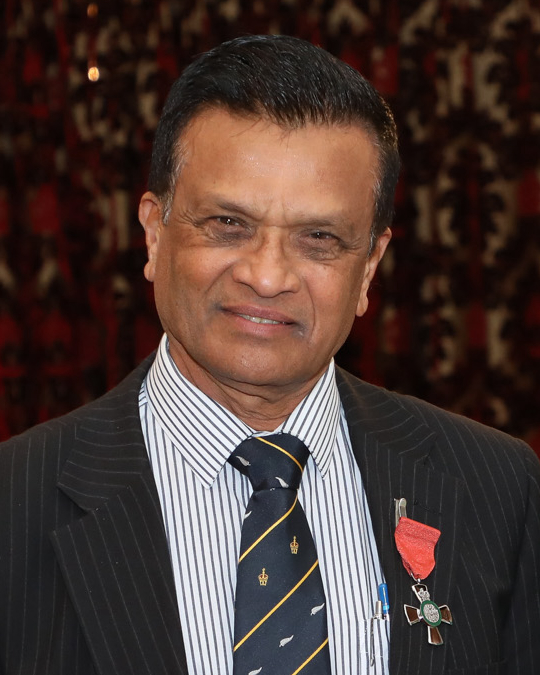
Prem Singh

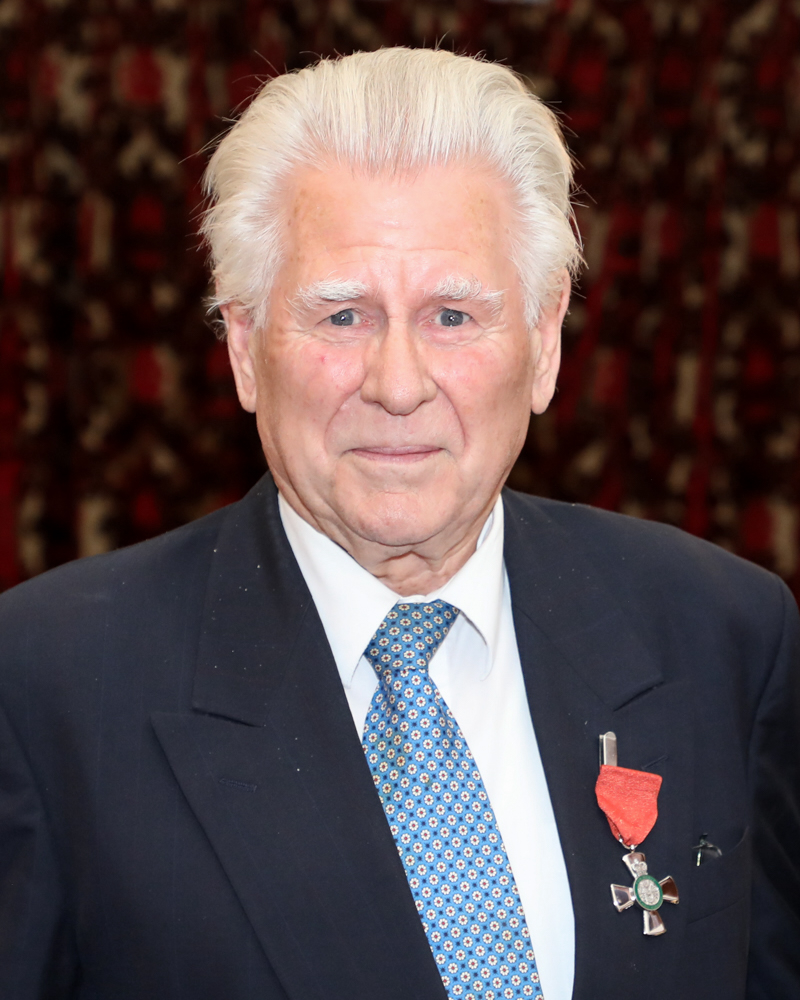
Edgar Spark

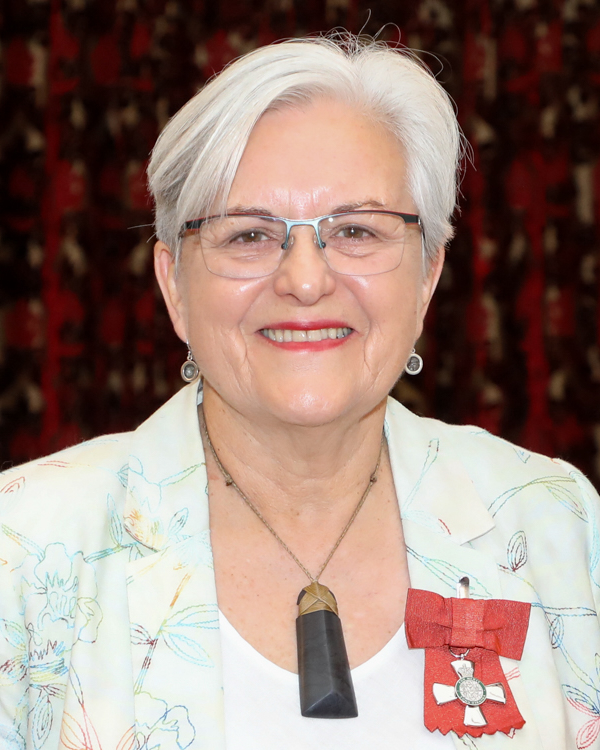
Maryan Street

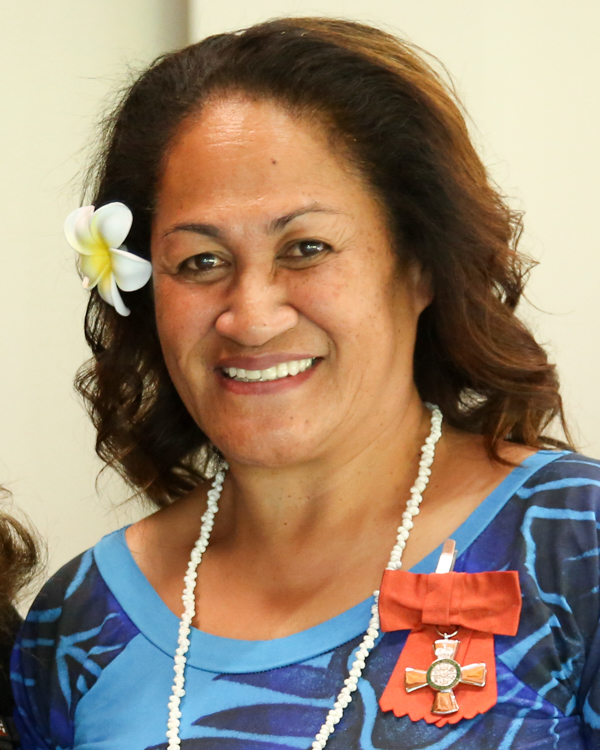
Tamasailau Suaalii‑Sauni

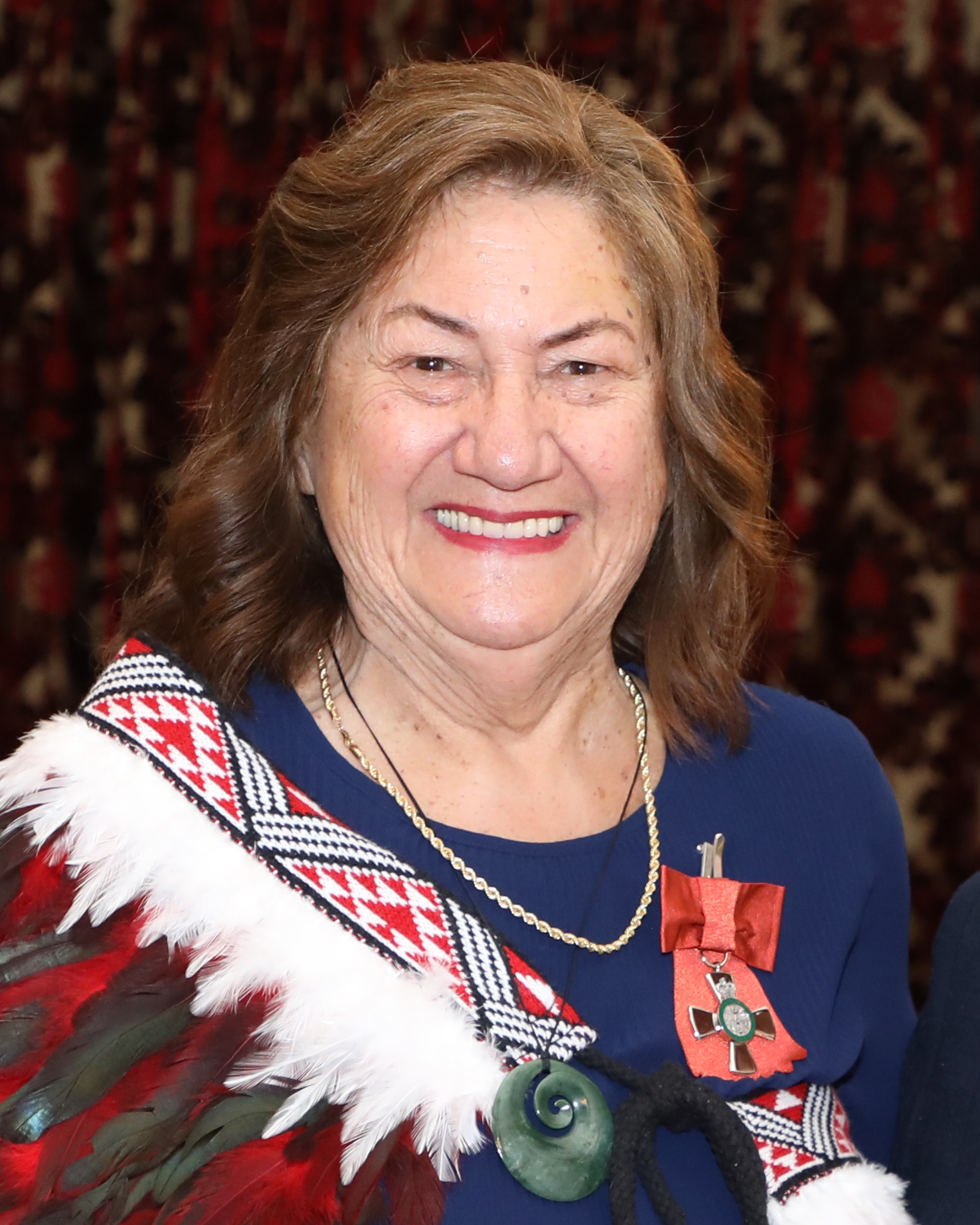
Bonnie Sue

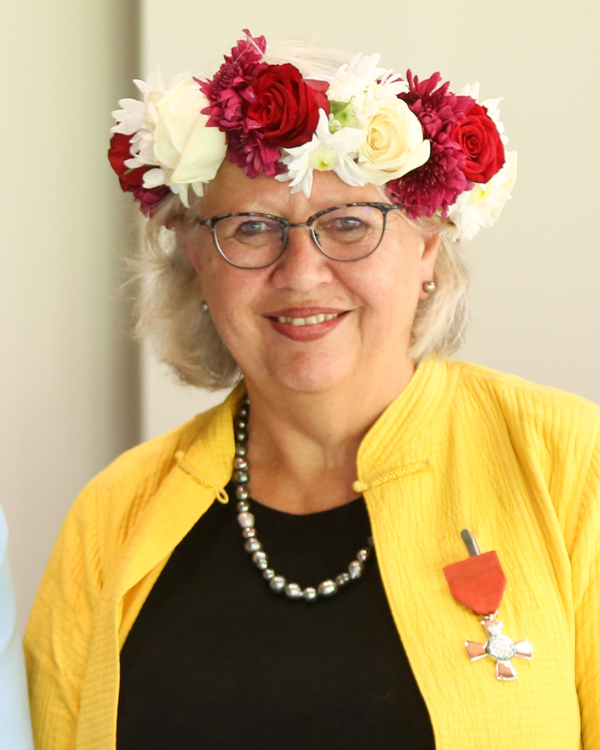
Yvonne Underhill

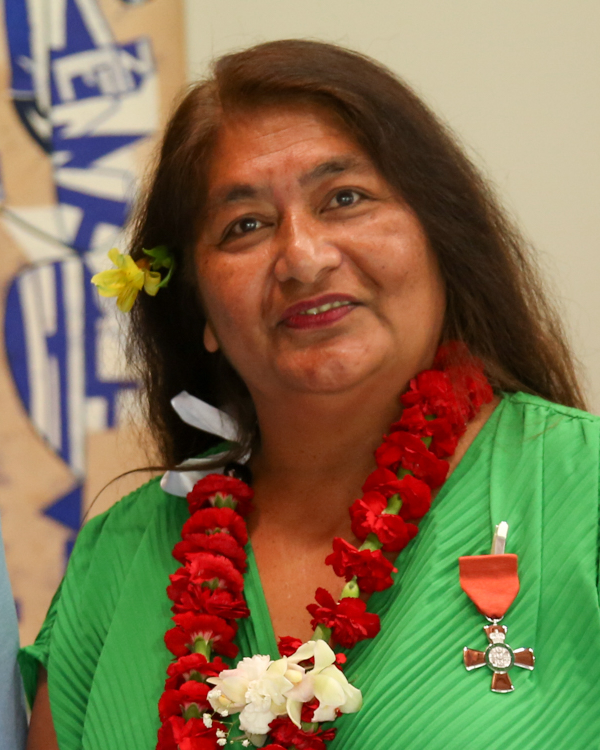
Makerita Urale

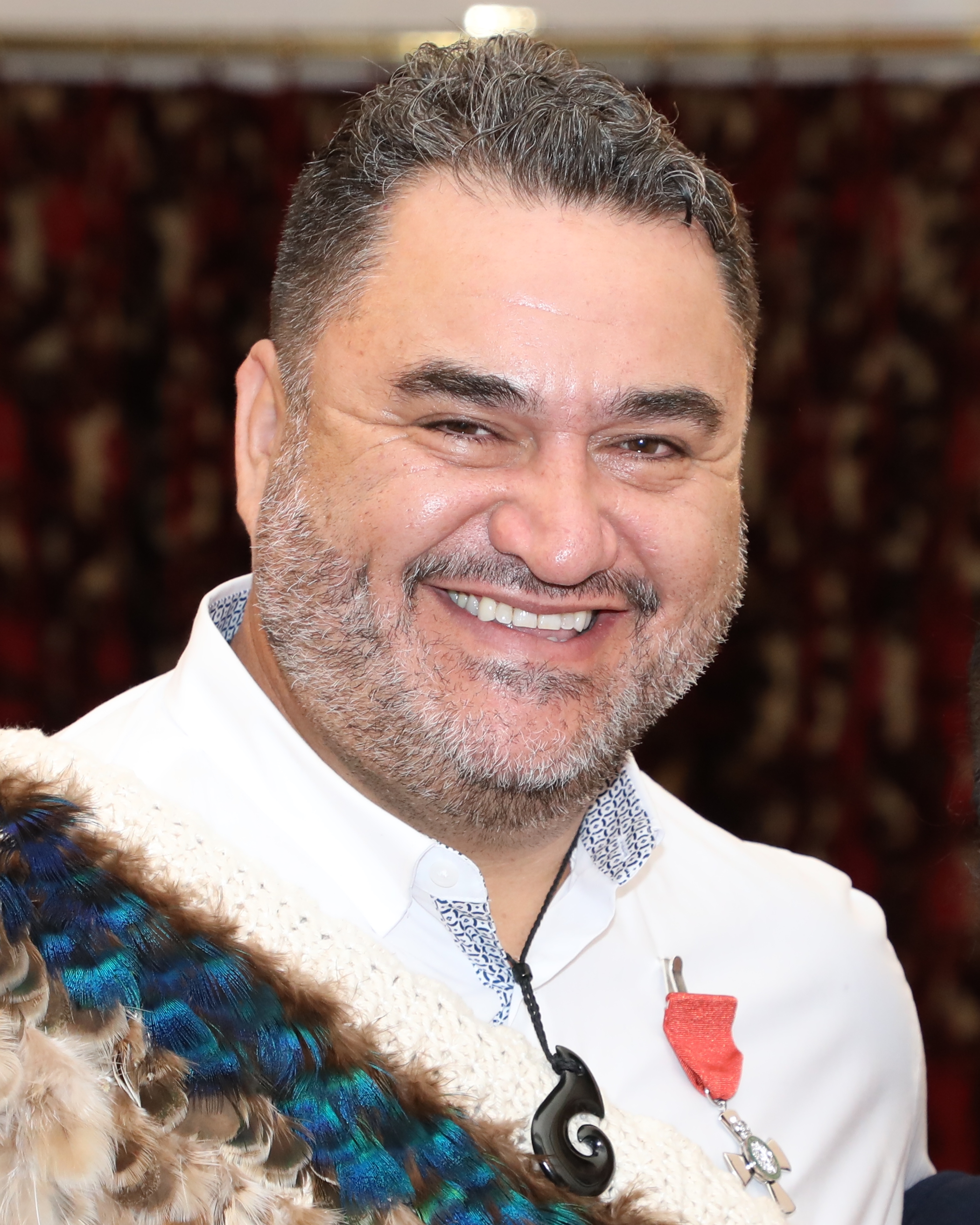
Tama Waipara

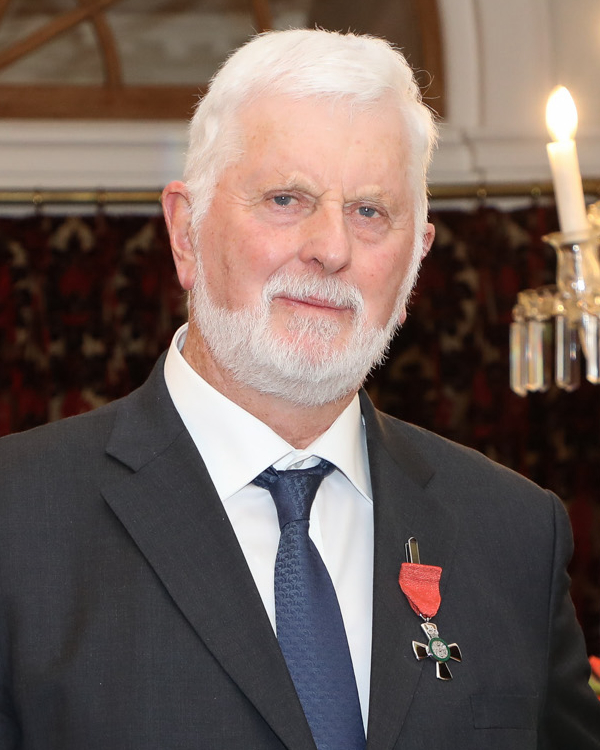
David West

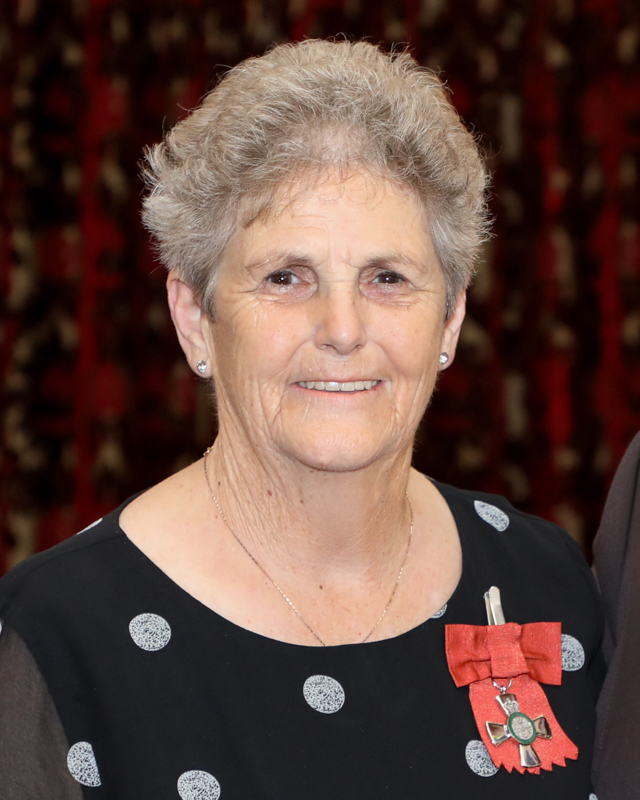
Diane Wilson

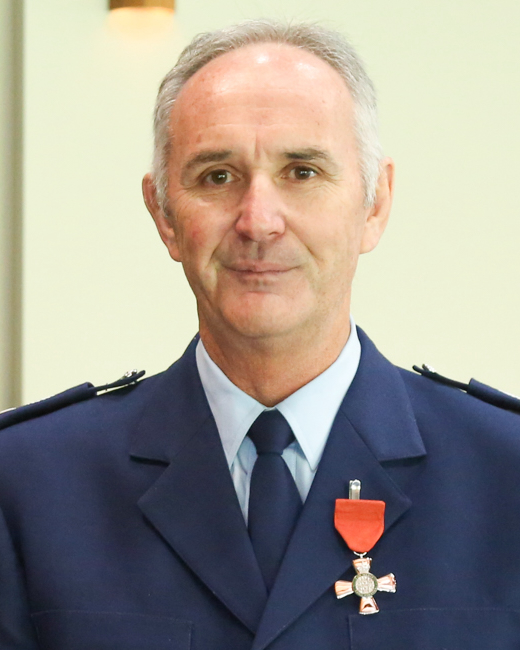
Karl Wilson

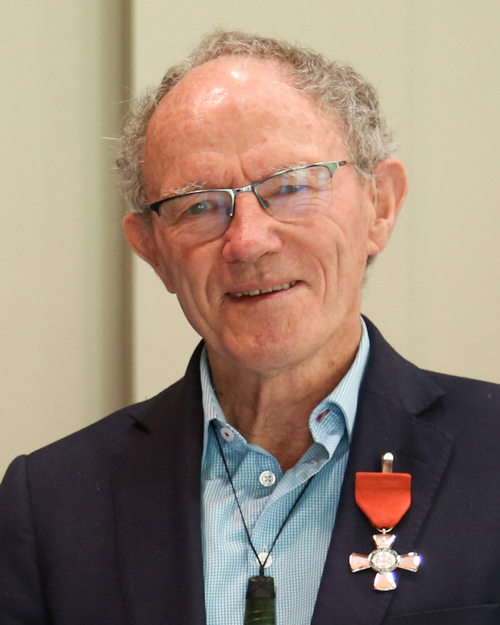
Lindsay Wood

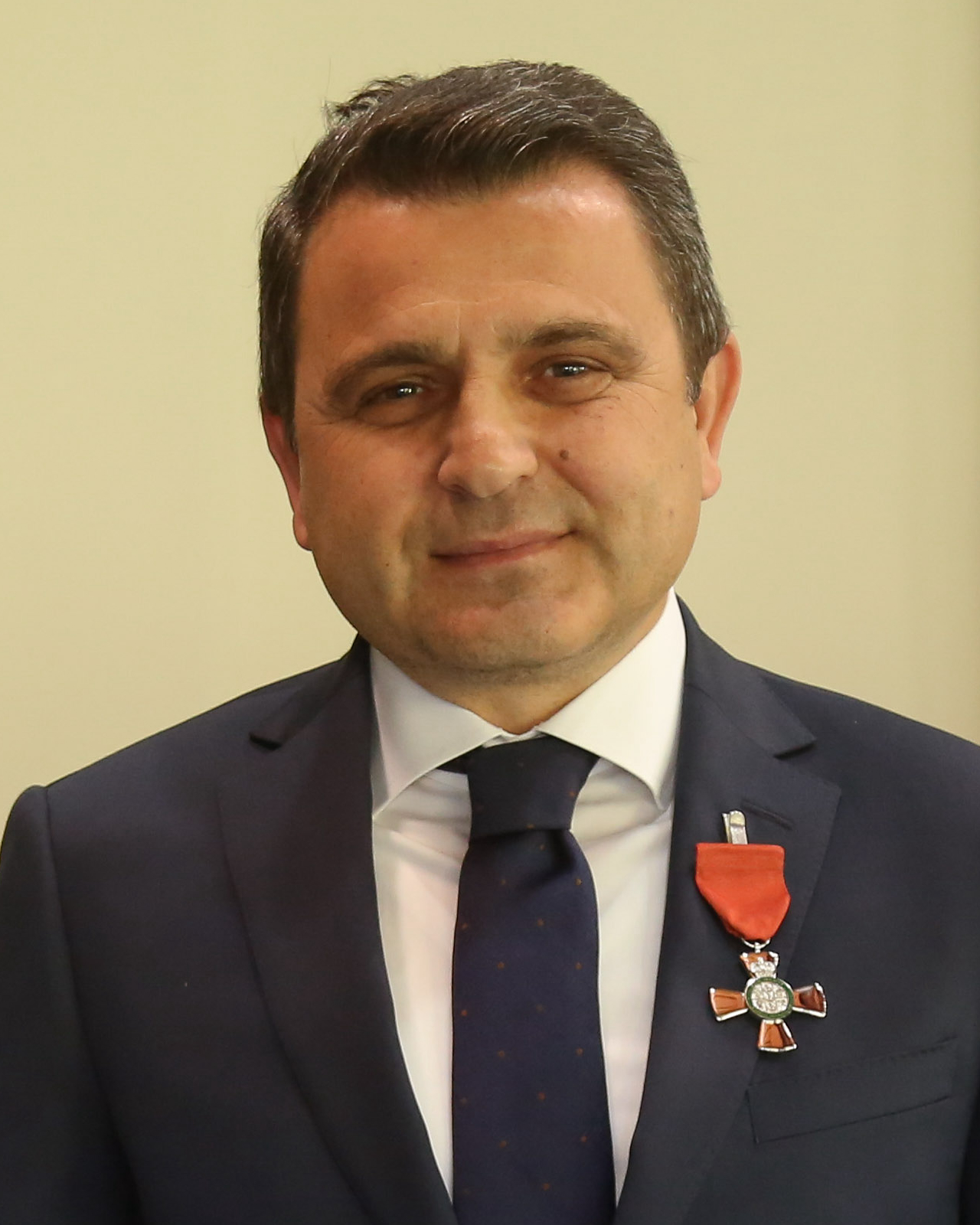
İsmail Kaşdemir

== Companion of the Queen's Service Order (QSO) ==
- Paul Thomas Gibson – of Kelburn. For services to disabled people.
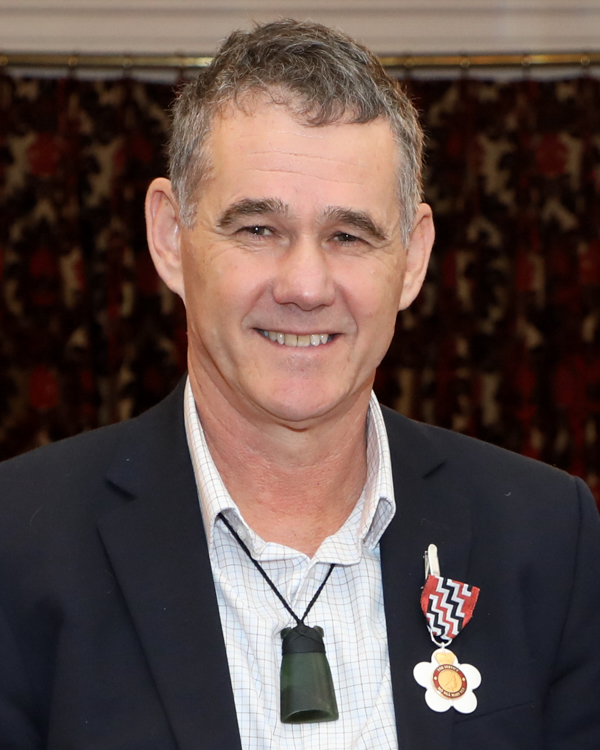
Paul Gibson

== Queen's Service Medal (QSM) ==
- Victoria Louise Andrews – of Akaroa. For services to heritage preservation and conservation.
- Lyall Ashley Bailey – of Winton. For services to the community and local government.
- David Alan Burnett – of Invercargill. For services to multisport.
- Ian Peter Carr JP – of Leamington, Cambridge. For services to the community.
- Neville Albert Carter – of Southbridge. For services to Fire and Emergency New Zealand and rugby.
- Paul Clements – of Waitati. For services to Fire and Emergency New Zealand and the community.
- Ewen Douglas Phillip Coleman – of Roseneath. For services to theatre.
- Lawrence John Counsell – of Tawa. For services to rowing.
- Alison Eleanor Crawford – of Inner Kaiti. For services to the community.
- Russell George Geange – of Carterton. For services to swimming and rugby.
- Helen Alison Gordon – of Waikanae. For services to the community.
- Trevor John Hawkins – of Martinborough. For services to the community.
- Katherine Jane Hawley (Katie Terris) – of Hutt Central. For services to the community and the arts.
- Barbara Mary Hay – of Stokes Valley. For services to the community and education.
- Kristeen Elizabeth Johnston – of Karori. For services to the community.
- Eruera Taihaere Kaiwai – of Tolaga Bay. For services to the community.
- Allan John Kerr – of Fairlie. For services to music.
- Geoffrey Ramon Lienert – of Waimate. For services to sports administration, particularly cycling and athletics.
- Te Ao Marama Maaka – of Morrinsville. For services to the community.
- Brian Campbell McCandless CB CBE – of Te Anau. For services to the community.
- Desmond Frank Meads – of Hamilton East. For services to hockey and the community.
- Ngahiwi Takamore Meroiti – of Porirua. For services to netball.
- Dr Michael John Hugh Miller – of Whangamatā. For services to rural health.
- Manisha Morar – of Johnsonville. For services to the Indian community.
- Bruce Alexander Nairn – of Tokoroa. For services to the community and sport.
- Hansaben Dhanji Naran JP – of Clarks Beach. For services to the Indian community.
- Karen Gaye Ngatai – of Taumarunui. For services to the community.
- Joy Margaret Oakly – of Nelson. For services to women and education.
- Gavin John O’Donnell – of Havelock. For services to the rural community and conservation.
- Brian Ernest Gladstone Pegler – of Leeston. For services to social work.
- James Harry Piner – of Runanga. For services to Fire and Emergency New Zealand and the community.
- Alister Douglas Robertson – of Marewa. For services to people with dementia.
- Jennifer Mary Mayson Saywood JP – of Whanganui. For services to restorative justice and women.
- Jennifer Mary Schollum – of Puhoi. For services to the community and heritage preservation.
- Susan Gay Stevens Jordan – of Mount Albert. For services to seniors and dance.
- Rowena Ngaio Tana JP – of Whangārei. For services to the Māori community.
- Rai Vaeruarangi – of Wiri. For services to the Cook Islands community.
- William Neil Walker – of Milton. For services to outdoor bowls and smallbore rifle shooting.
- Athula Cuda Bandara Wanasinghe JP – of Grenada Village. For services to the Sri Lankan community and cricket

Honorary

- Liyanage Sadun Sampath Kithulagoda – of Tawa. For services to the Sri Lankan community
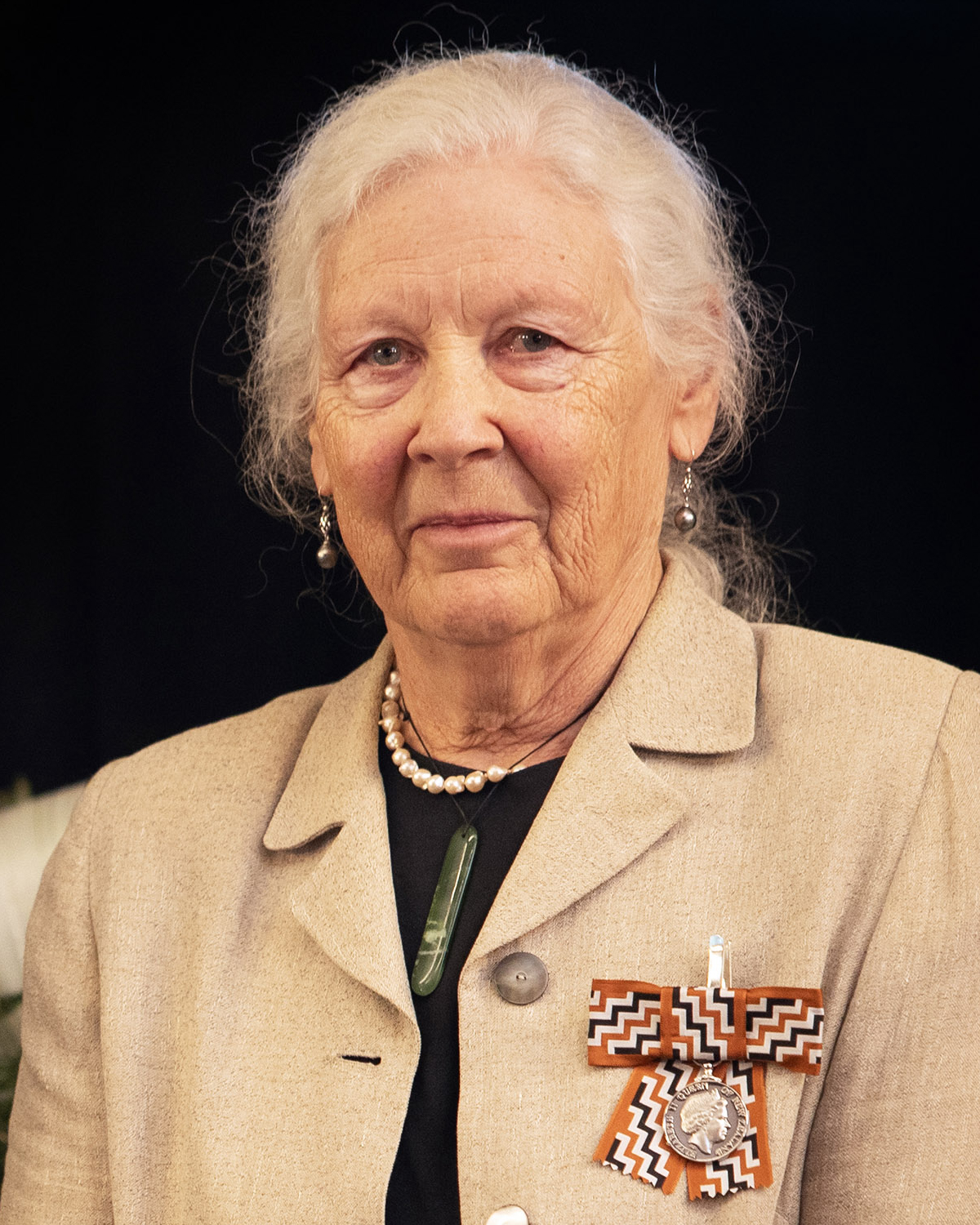
Victoria Andrews

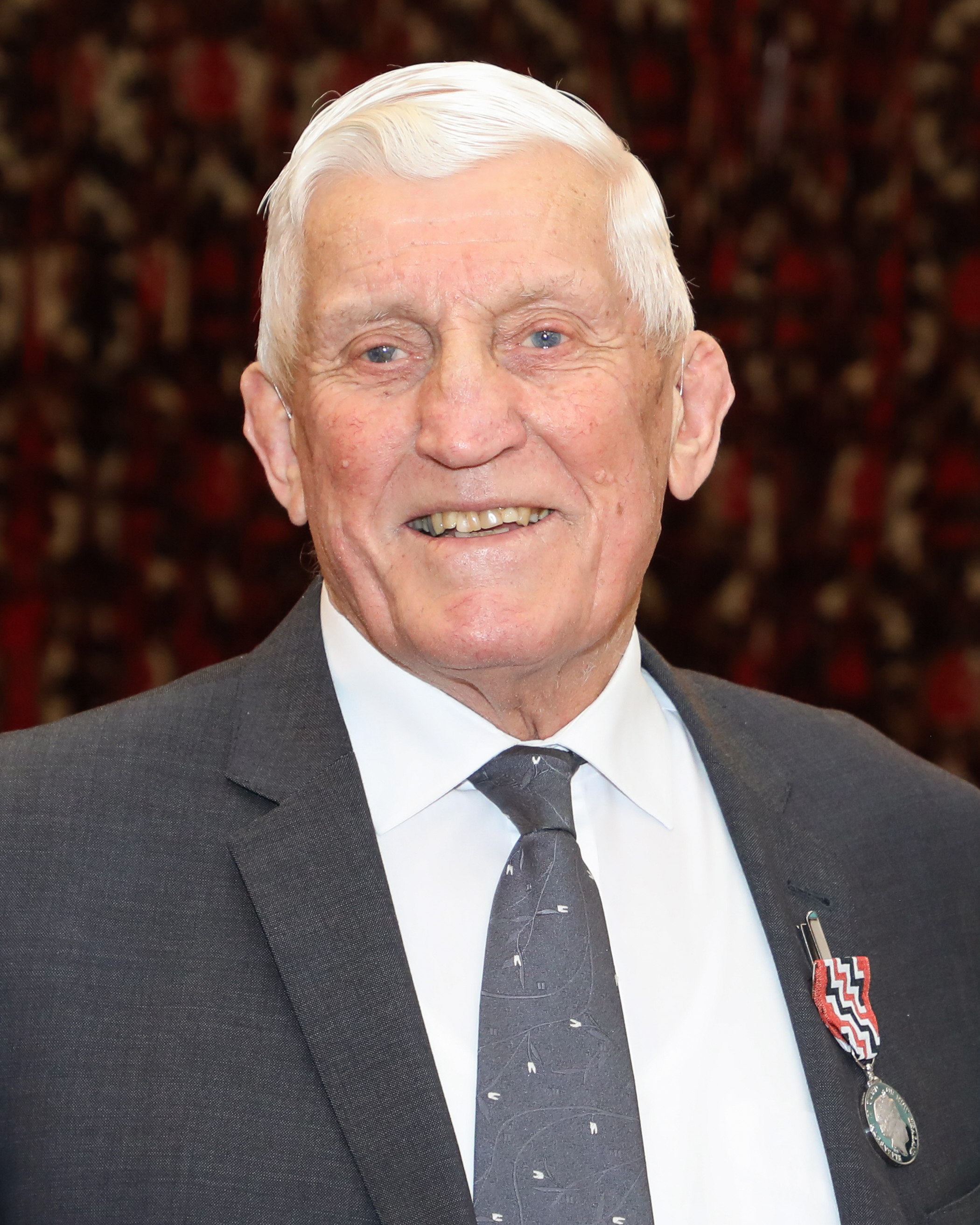
Lyall Bailey

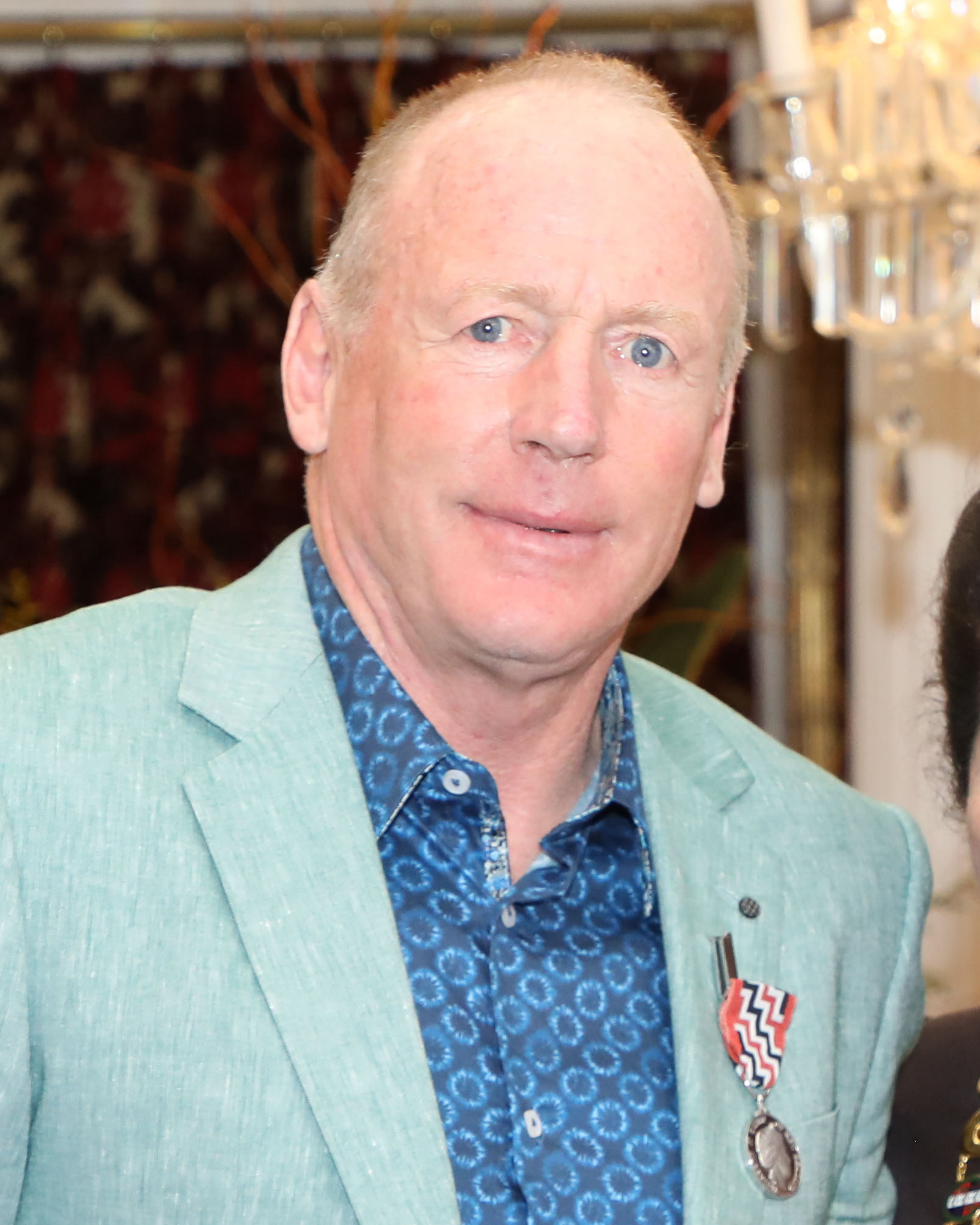
Ginge Burnett

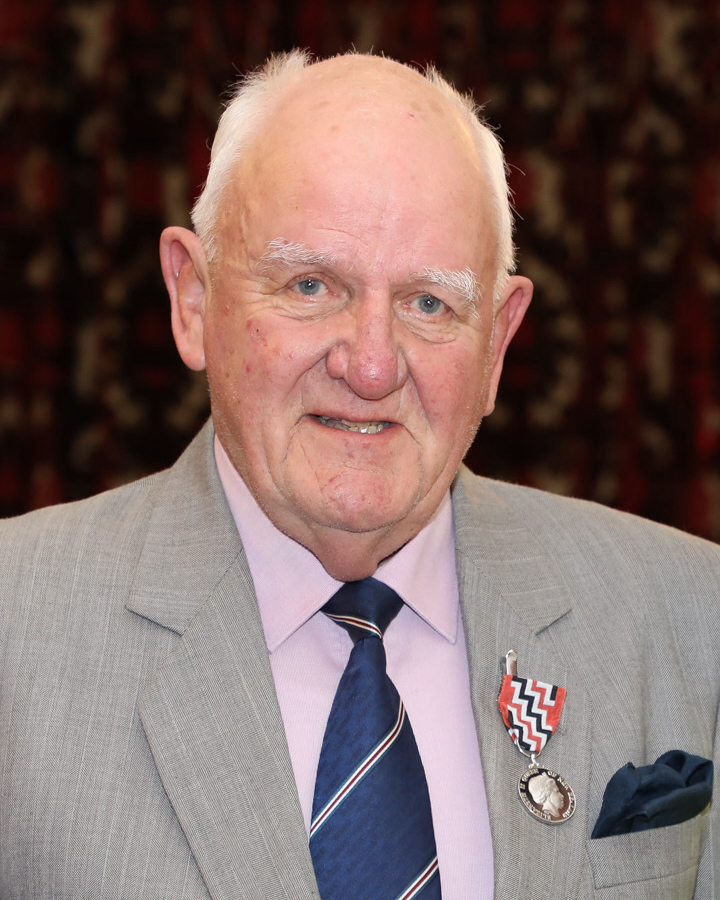
Peter Carr

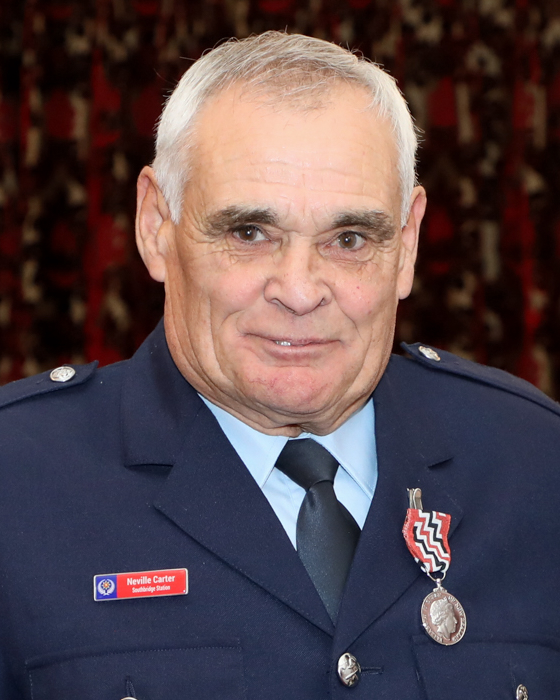
Neville Carter

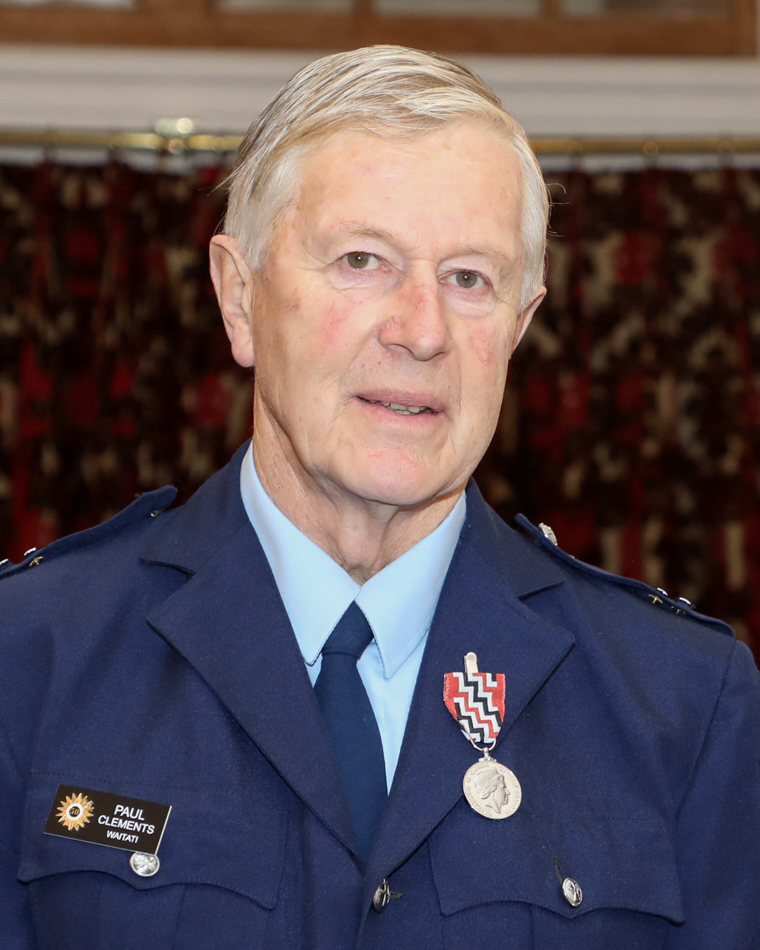
Paul Clements

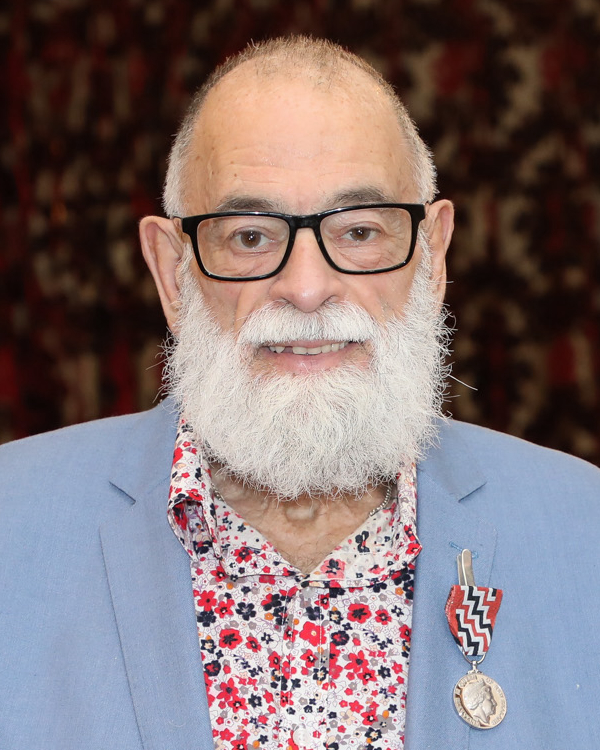
Ewen Coleman

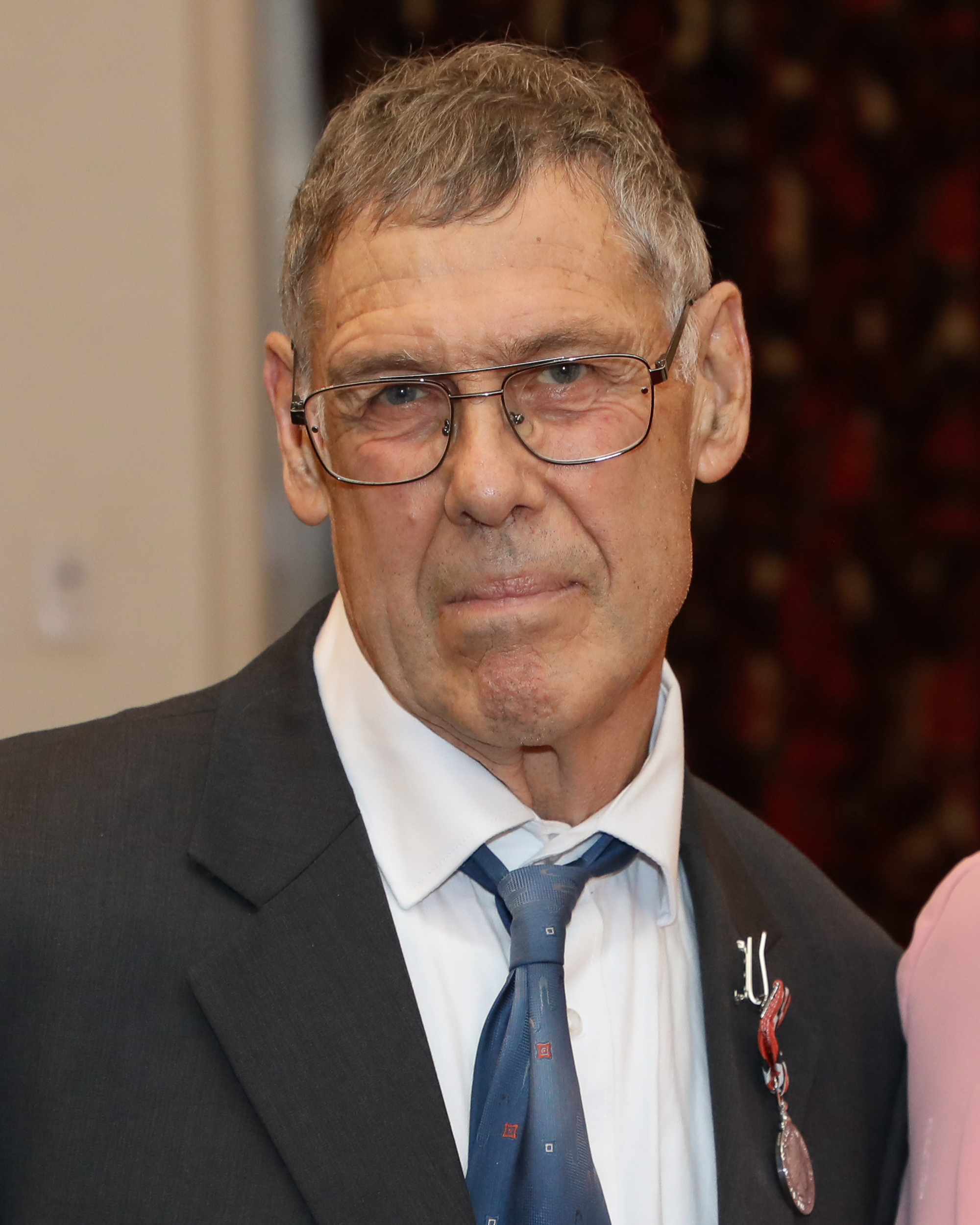
Laurie Counsell

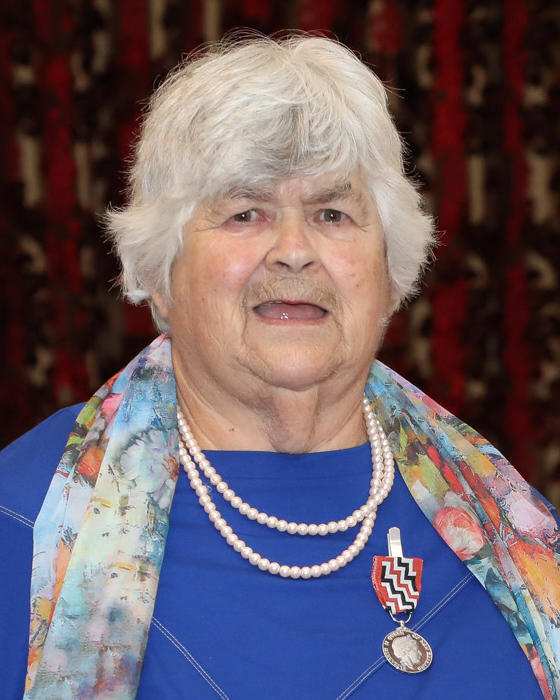
Alison Crawford

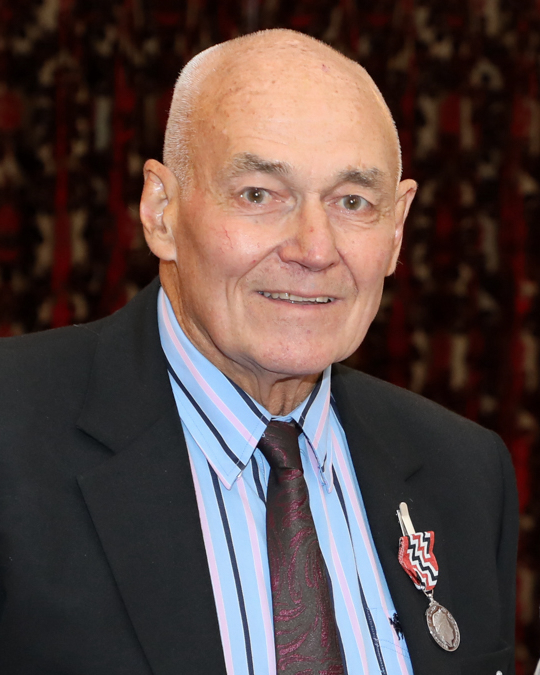
Russell Geange

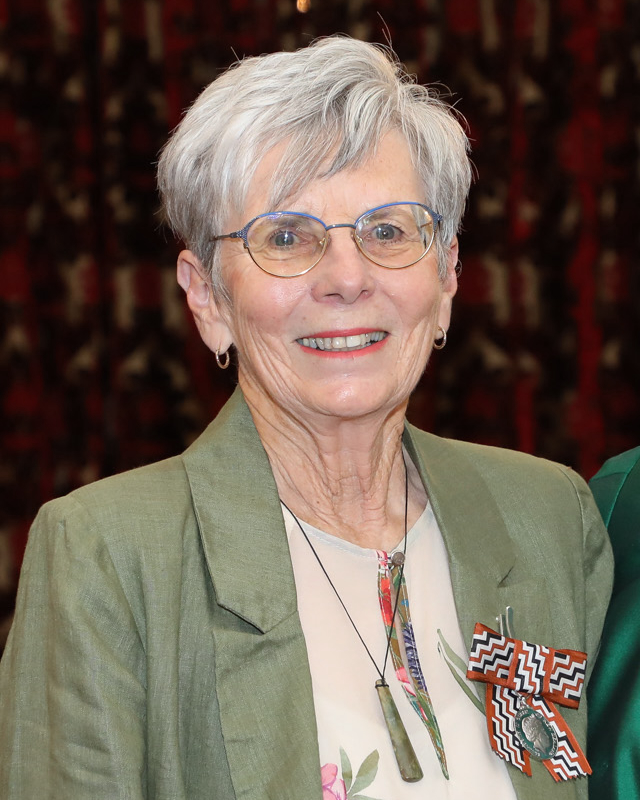
Helen Gordon

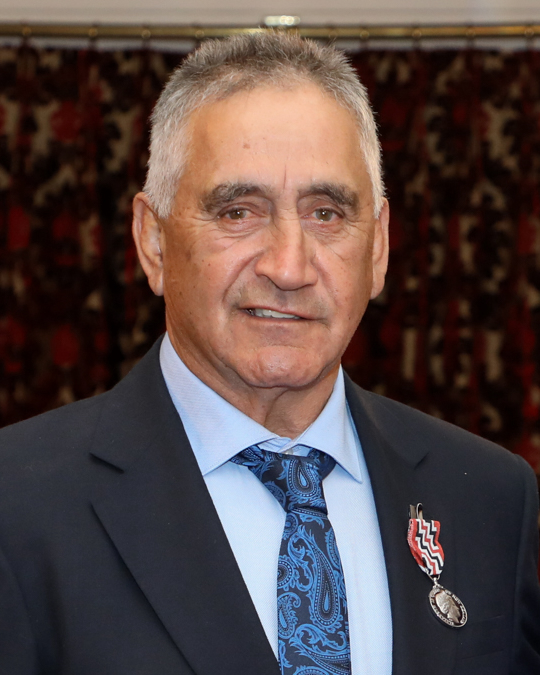
Trevor Hawkins

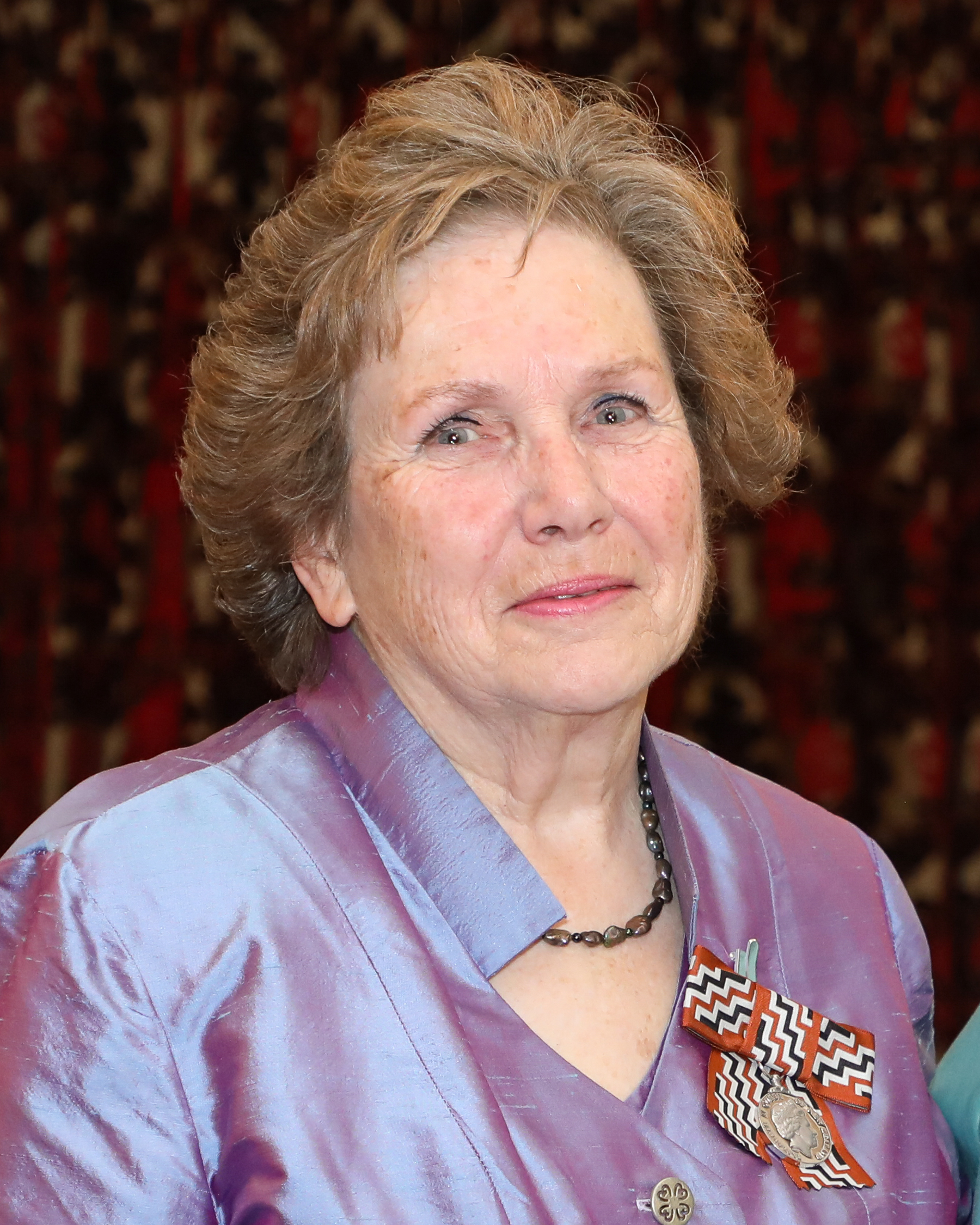
Katie Terris

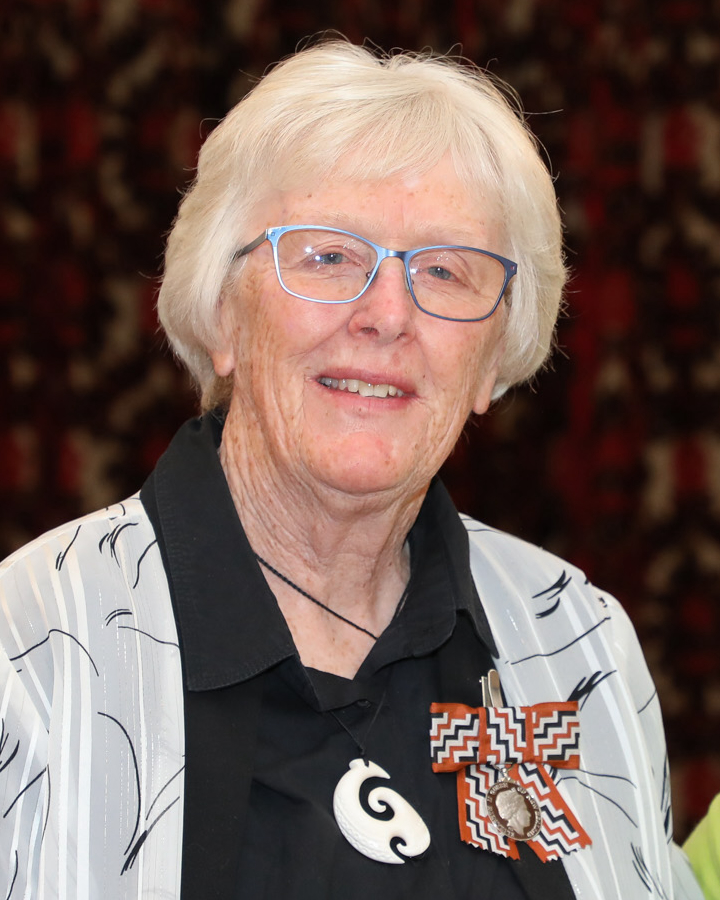
Barbara Hay

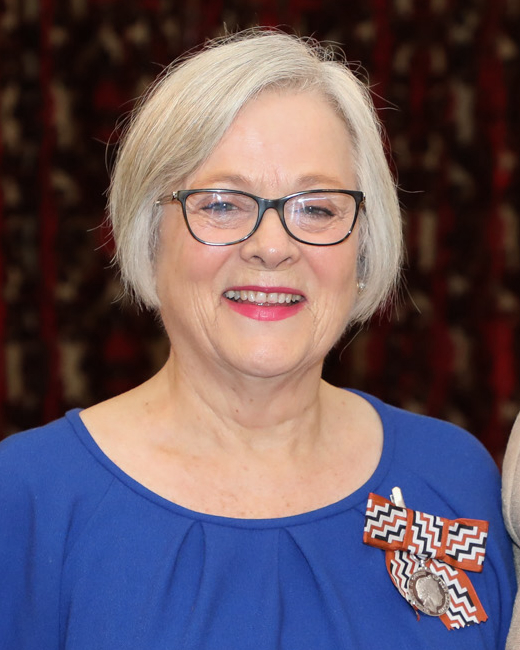
Kristeen Johnston

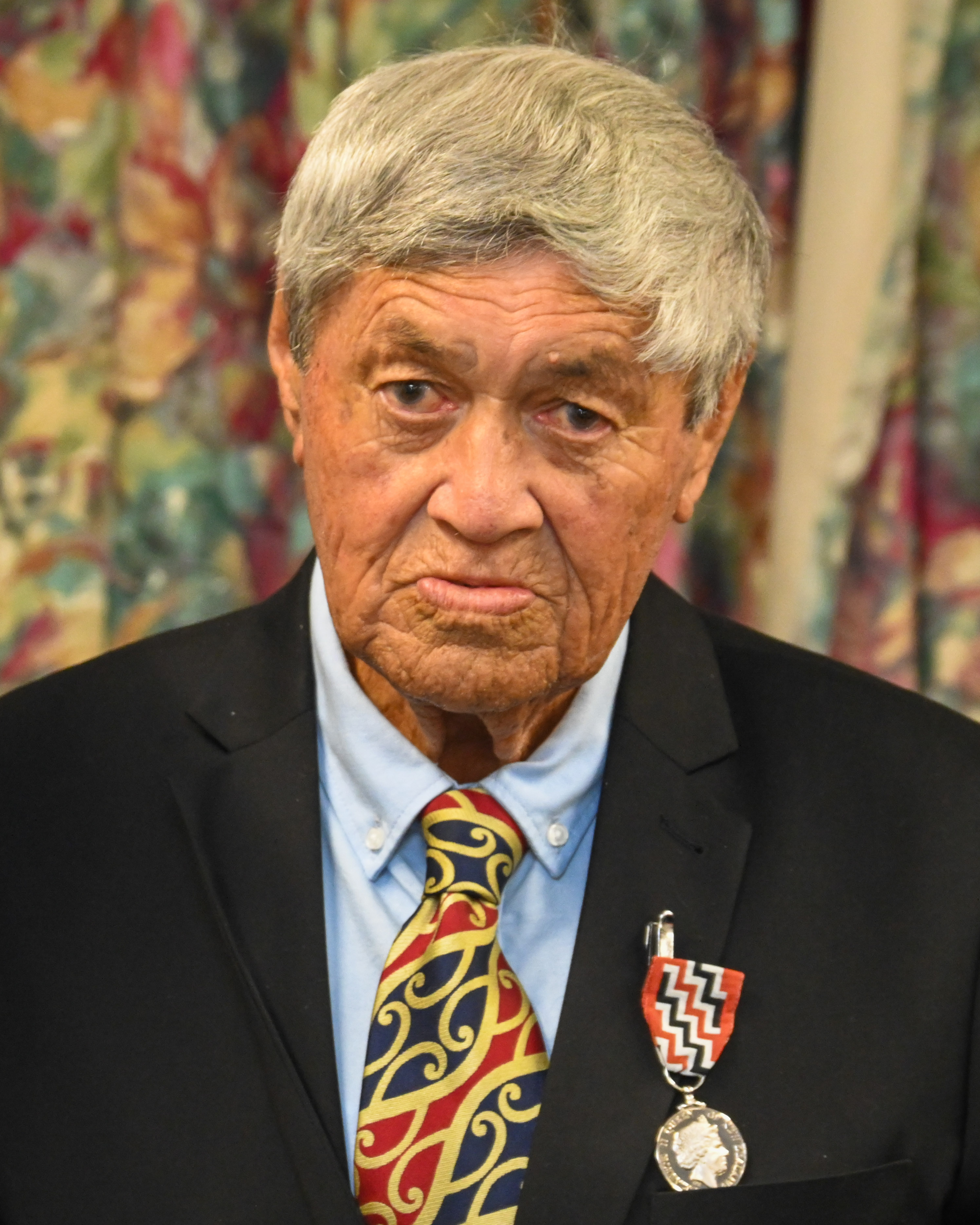
Eru Kaiwai

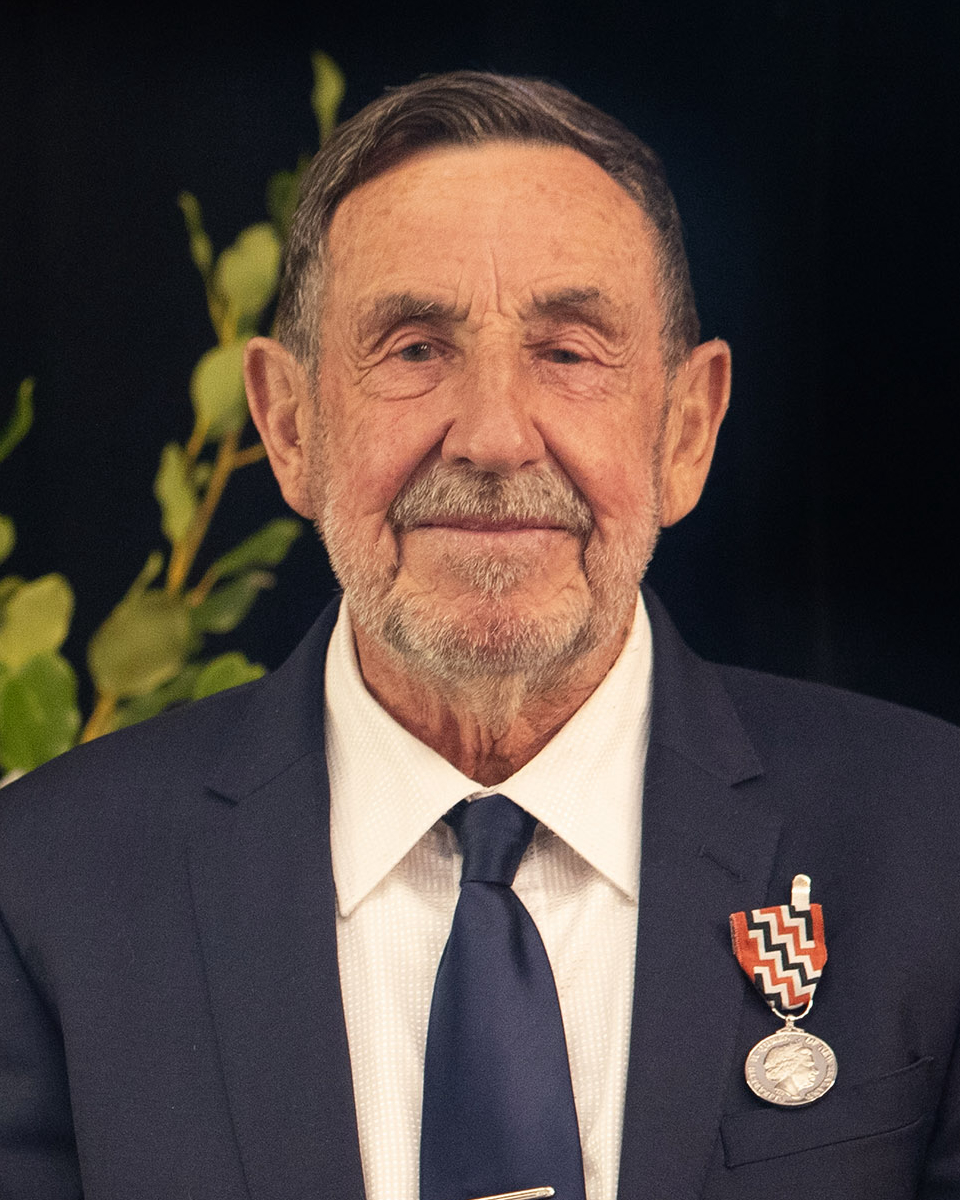
Allan Kerr

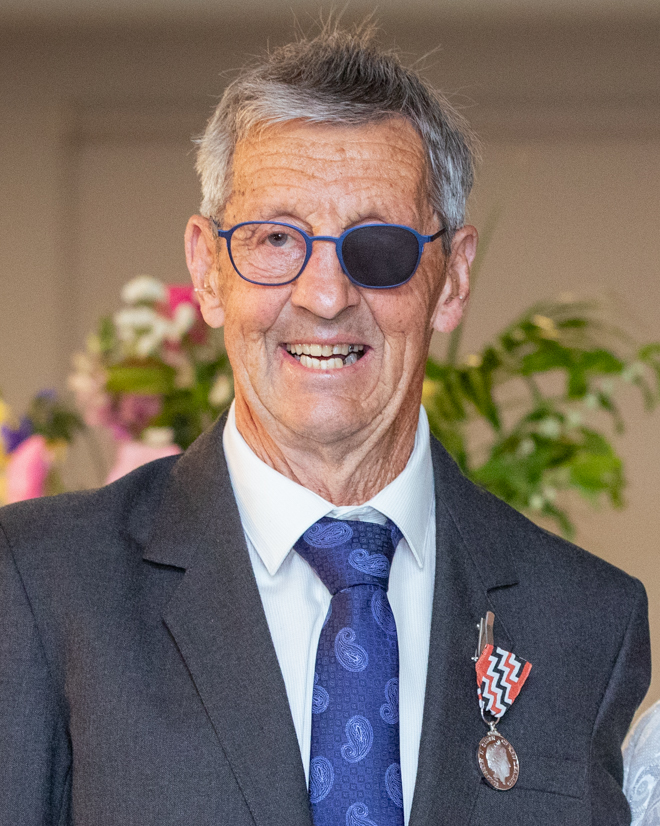
Geoff Lienert

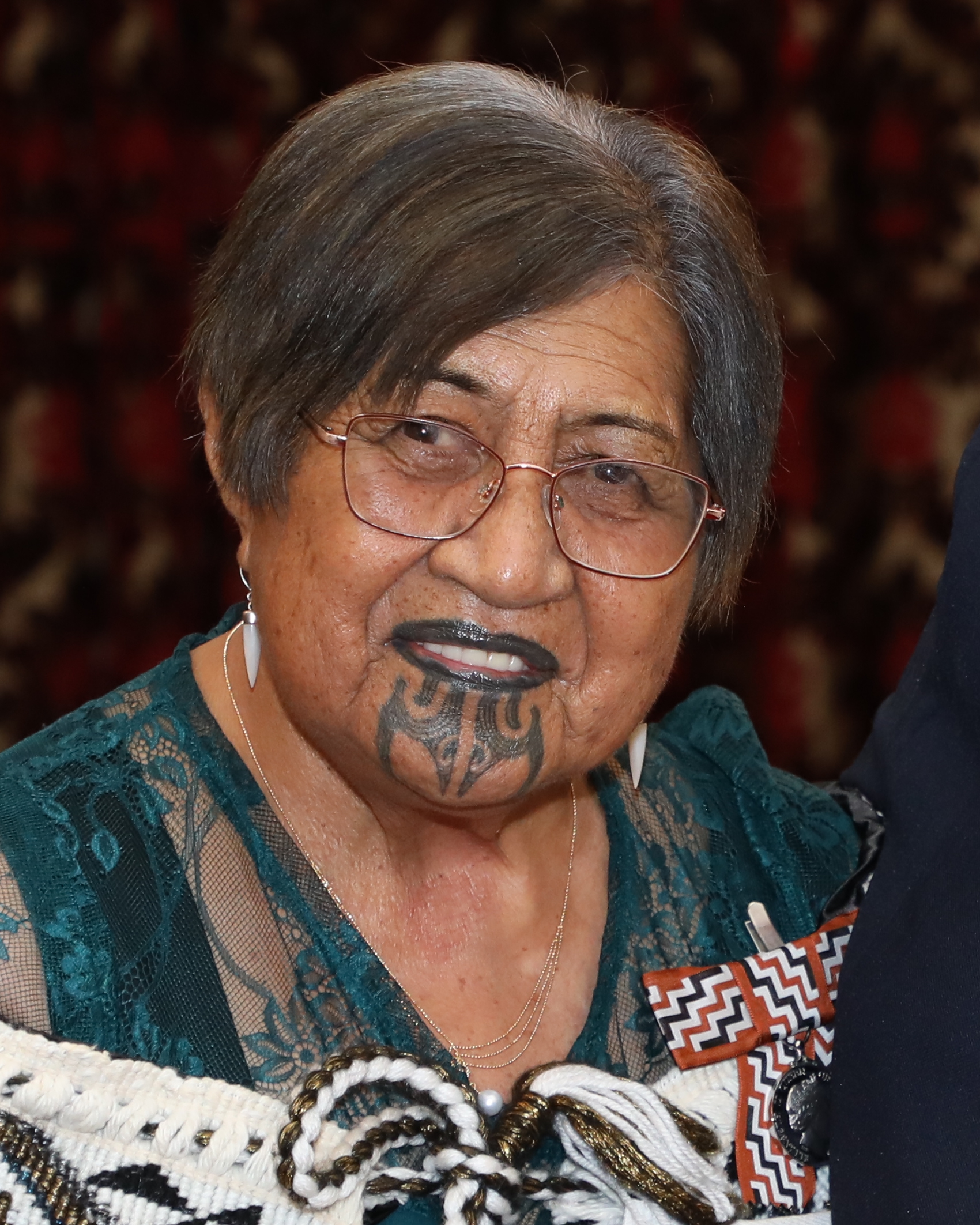
Te Ao Marama Maaka

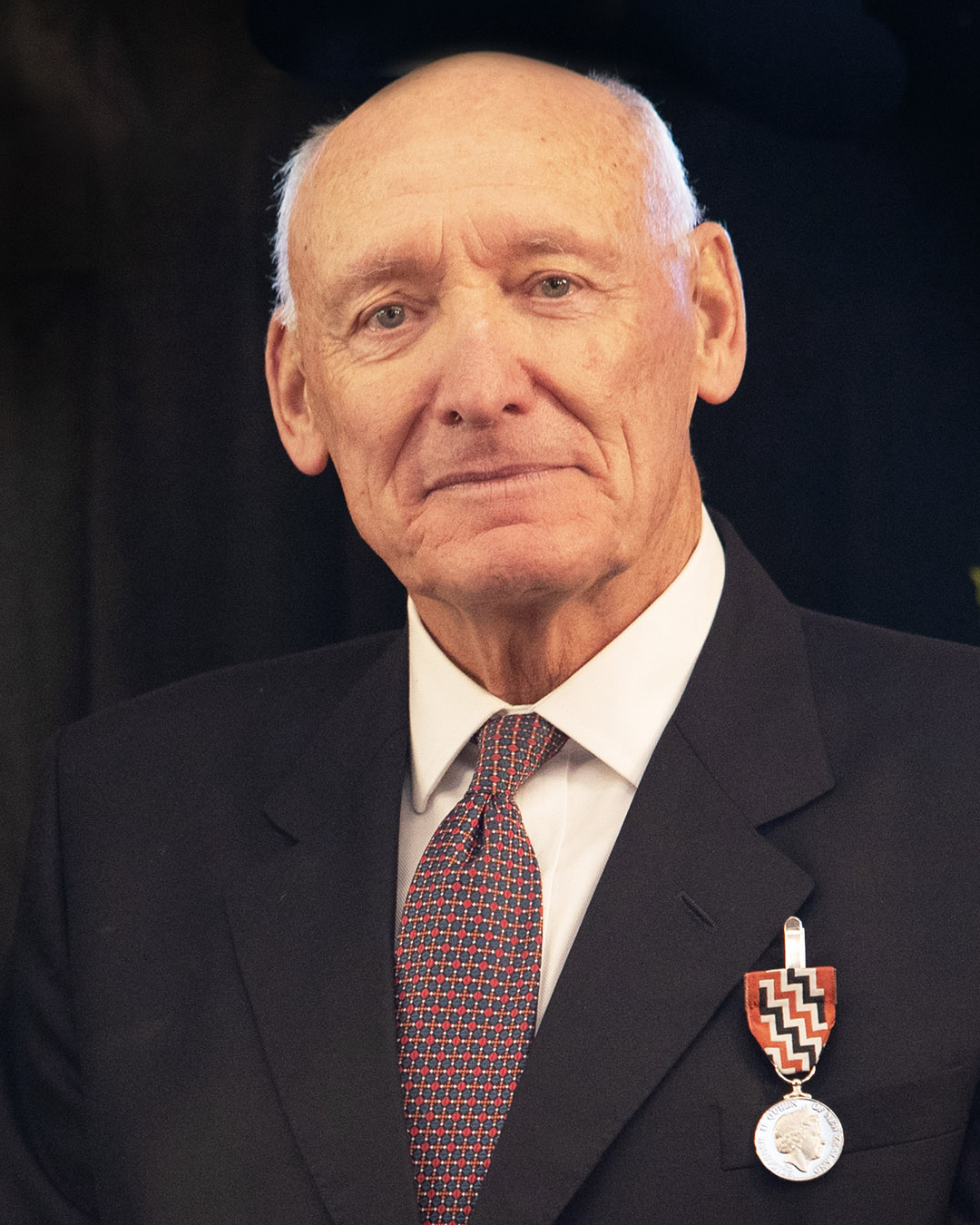
Brian McCandless

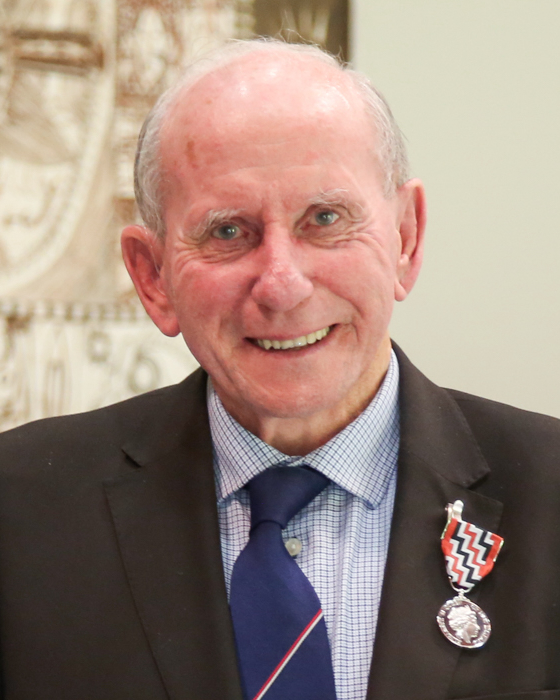
Des Meads

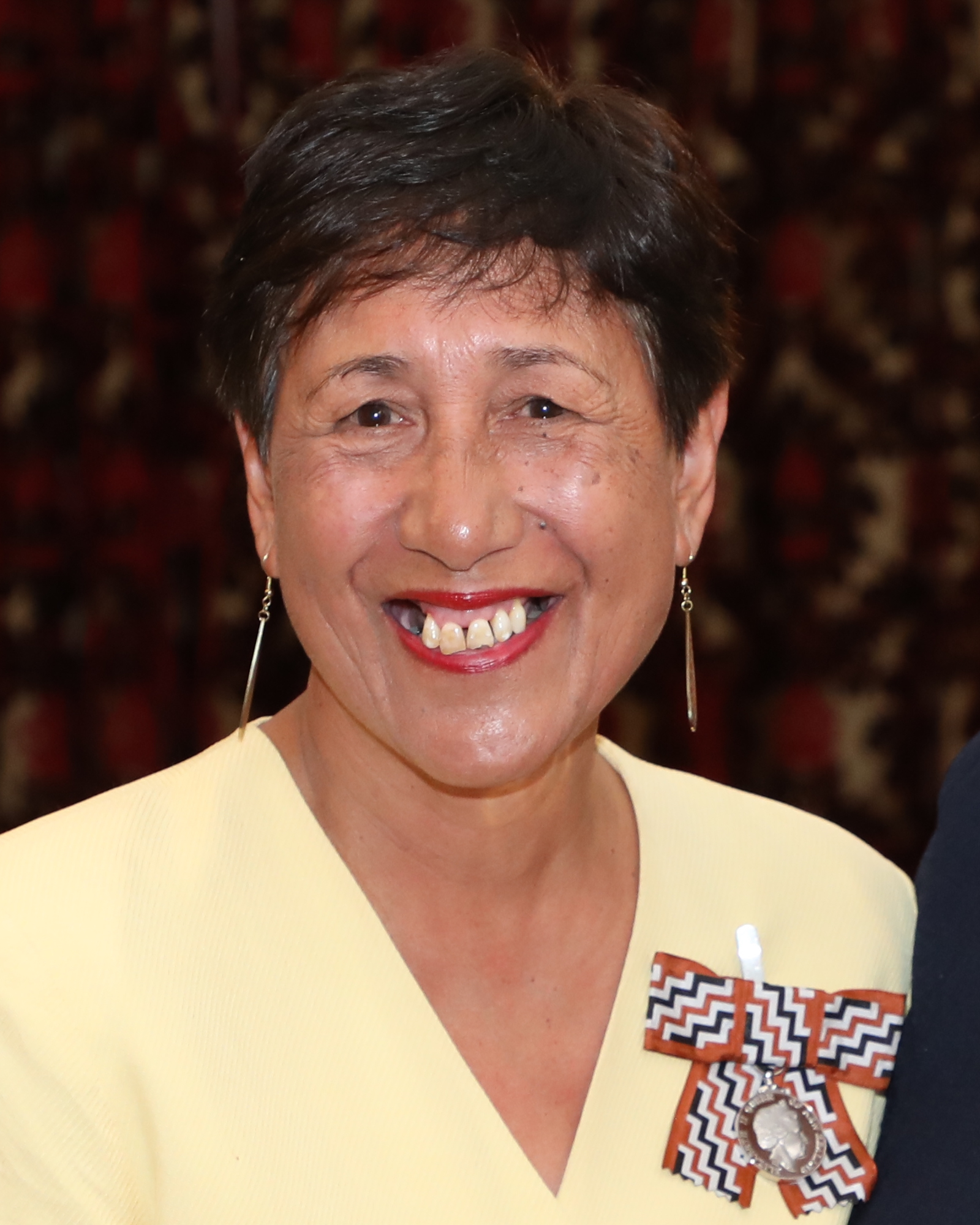
Ngahiwi Meroiti

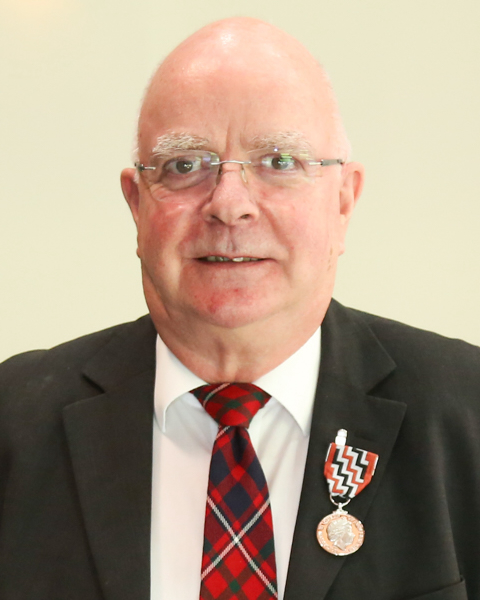
Michael Miller

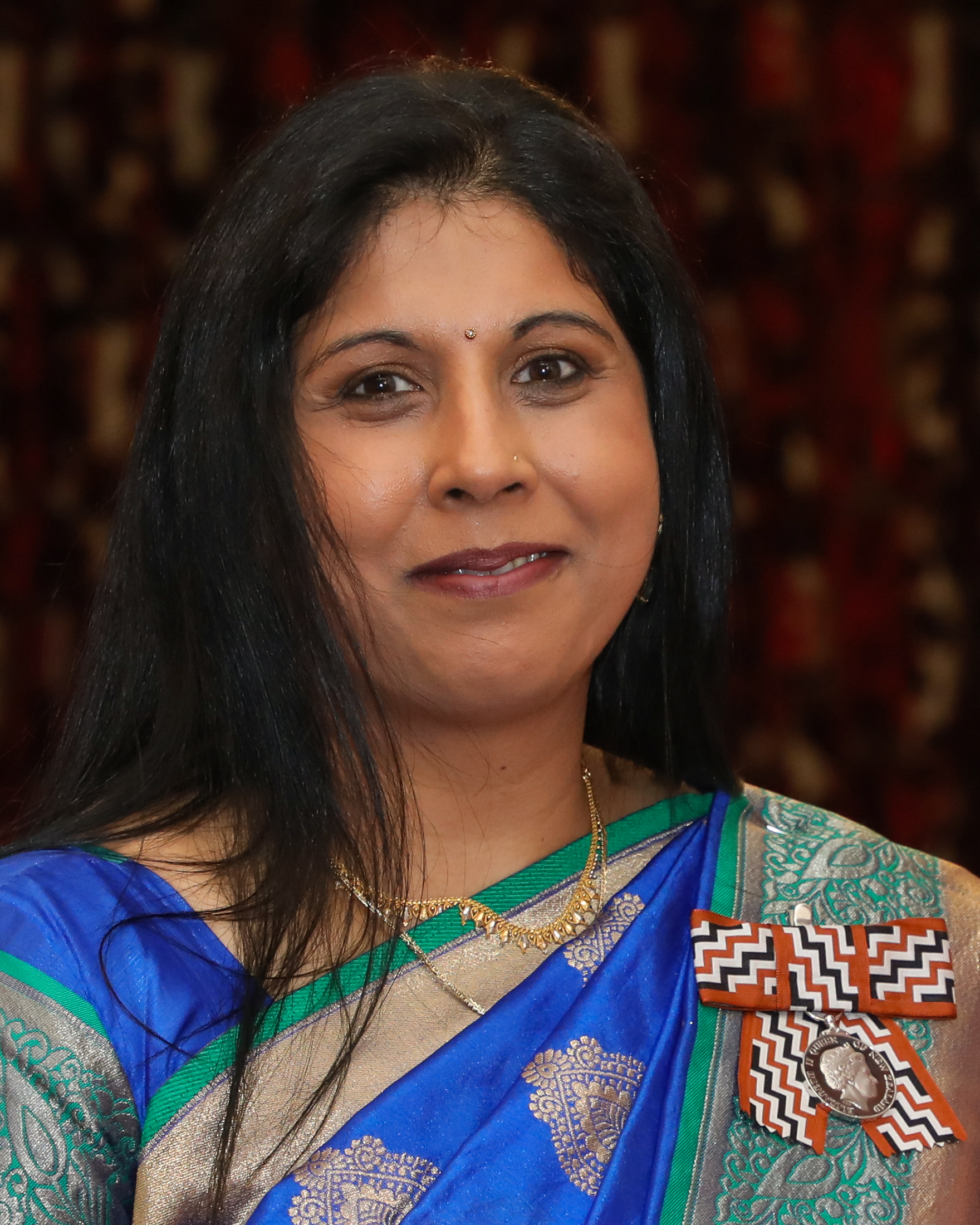
Manisha Morar

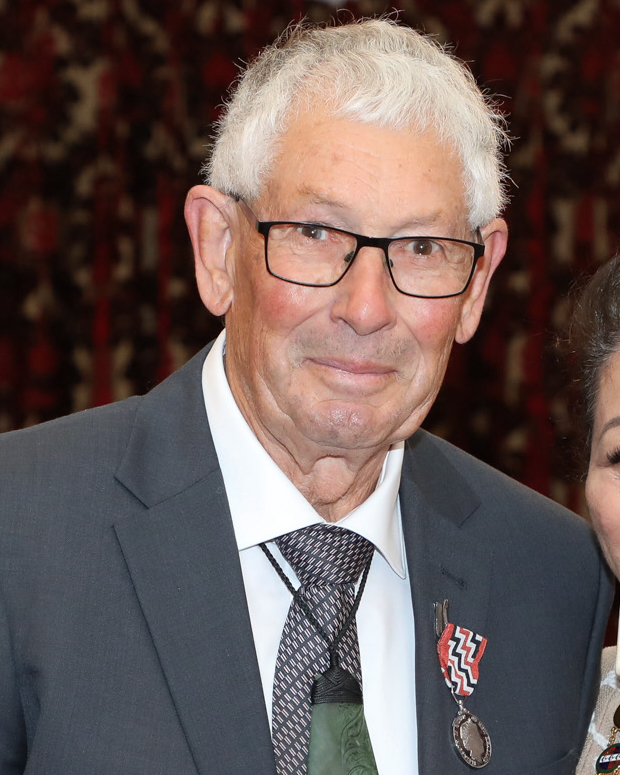
Bruce Nairn

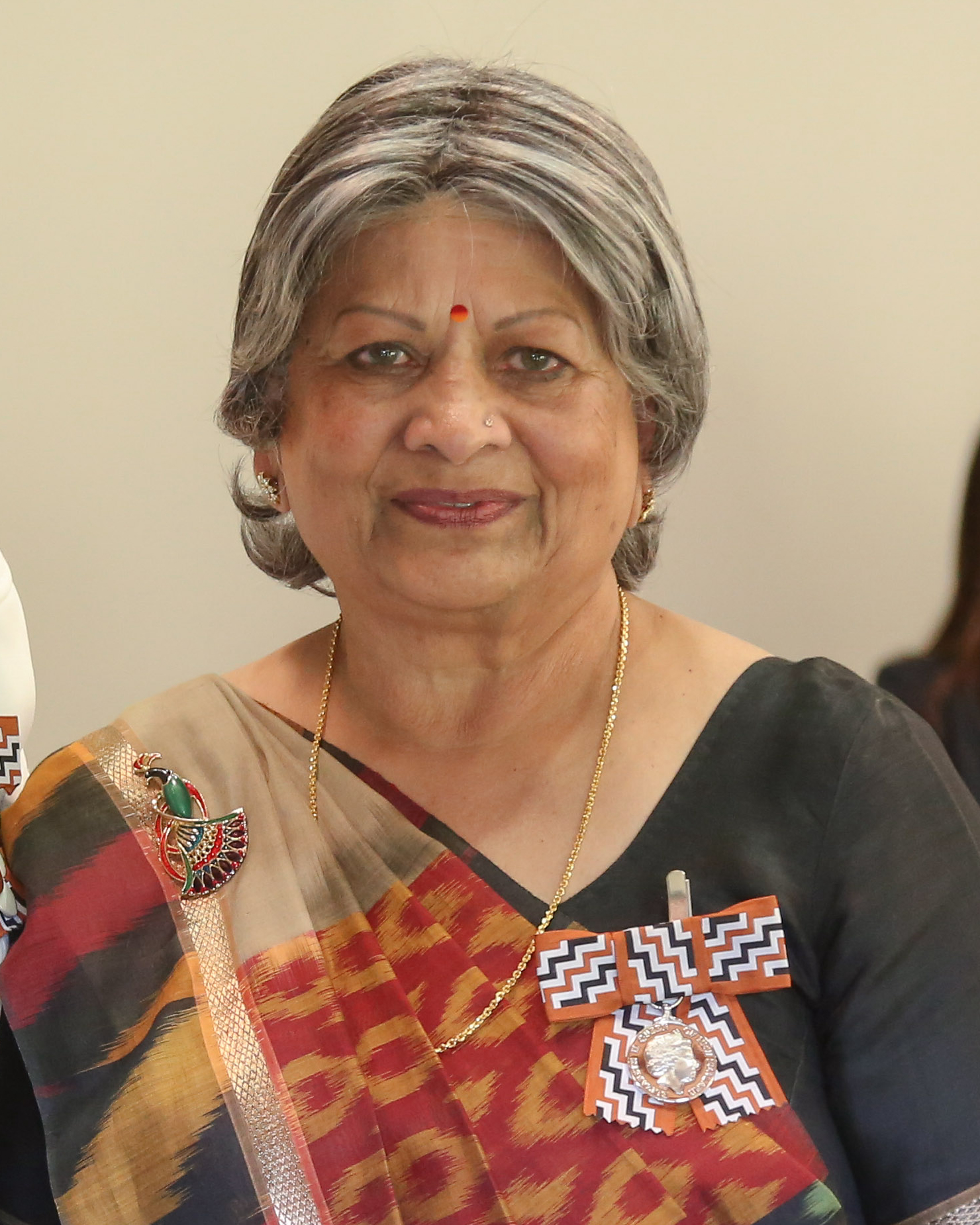
Hansa Naran

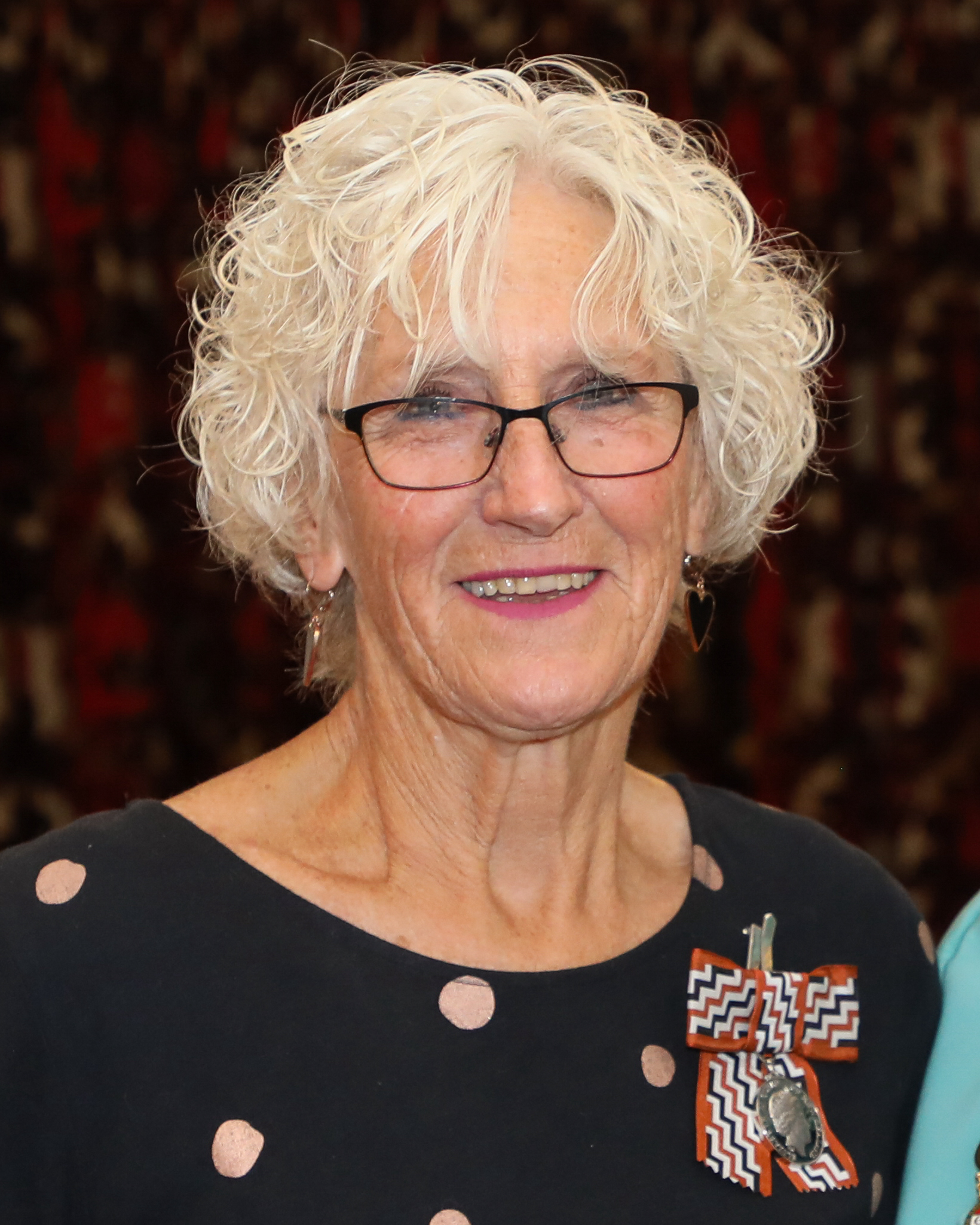
Karen Ngatai

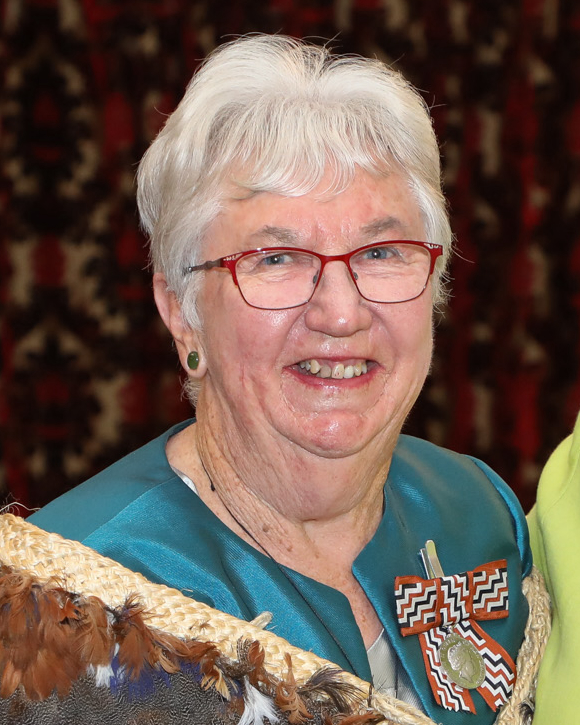
Joy Oakly

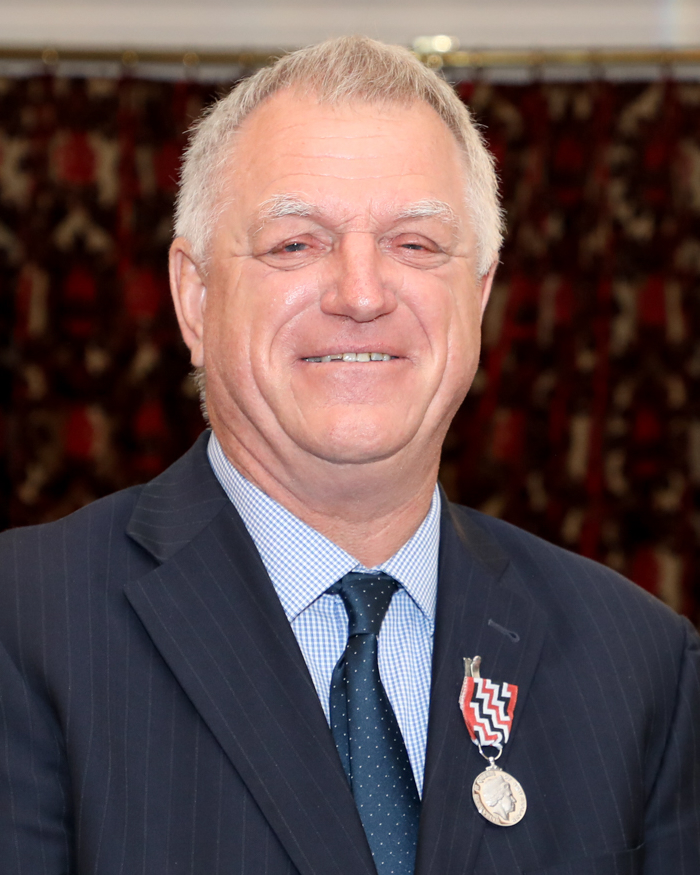
Gavin O'Donnell

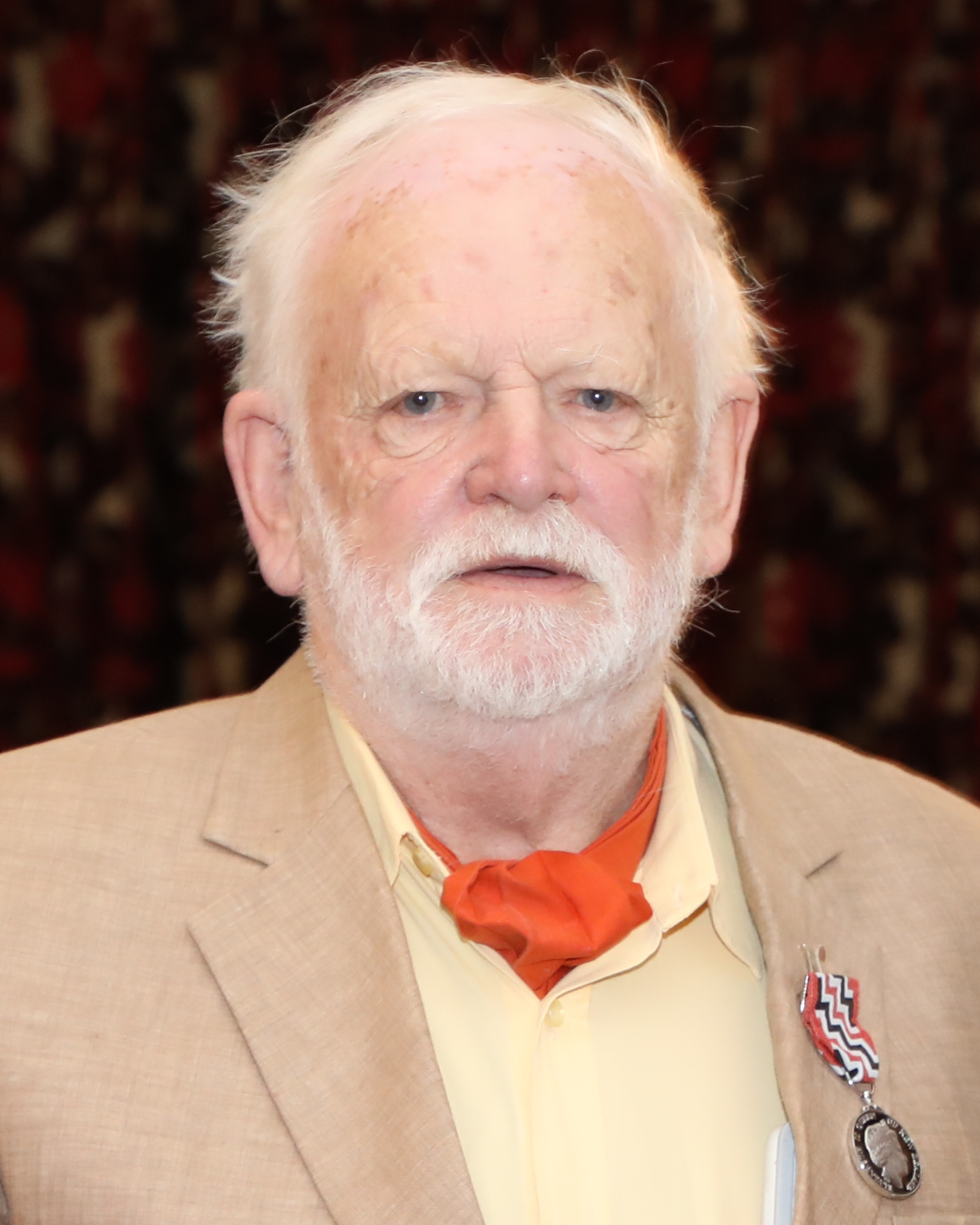
Brian Pegler

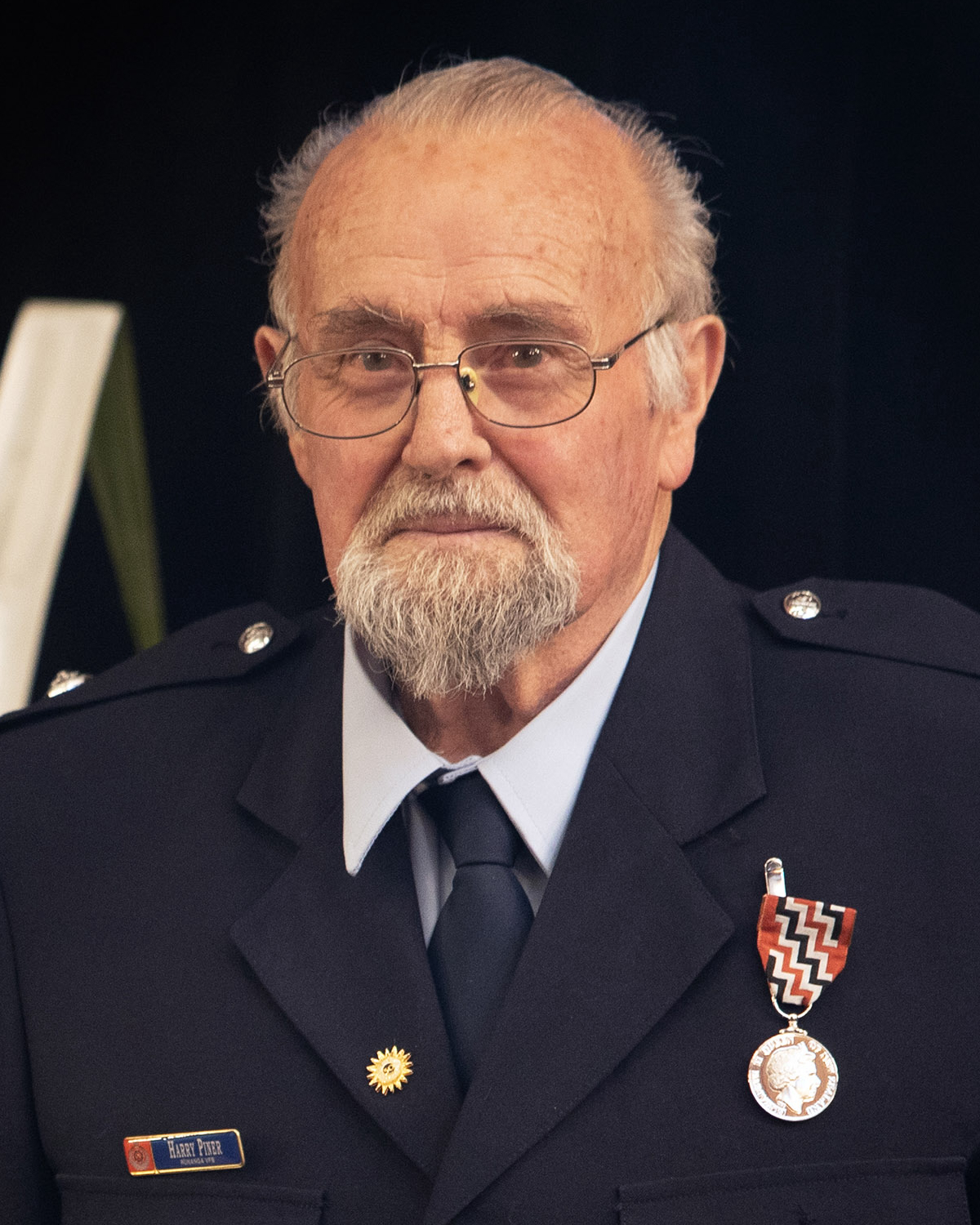
Harry Piner

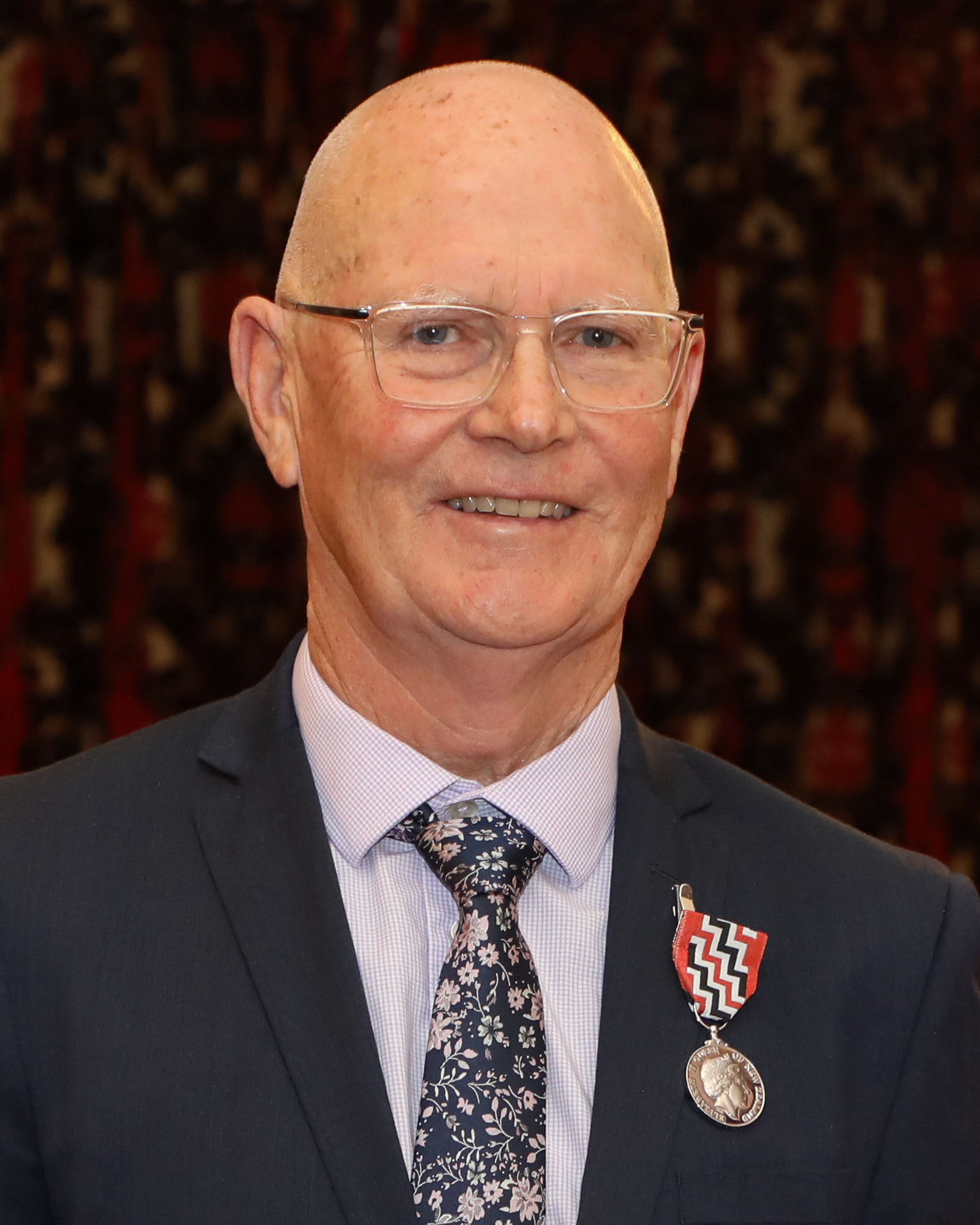
Alister Robertson

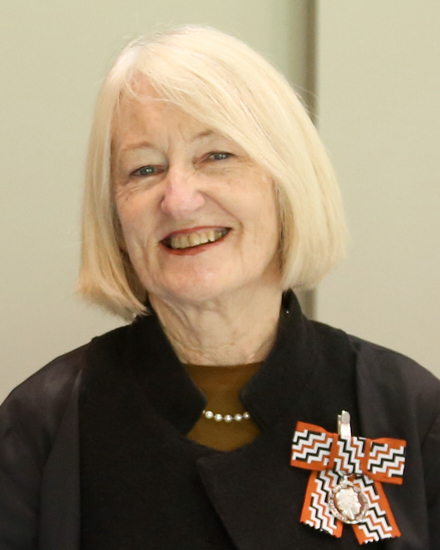
Jennifer Saywood

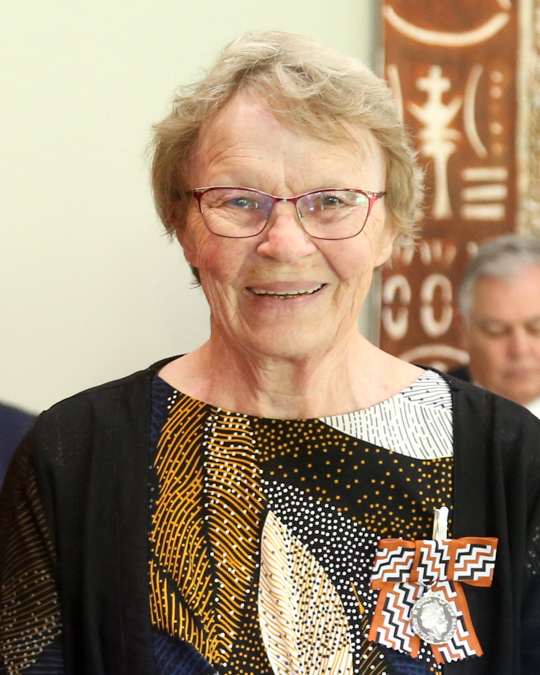
Jennifer Schollum

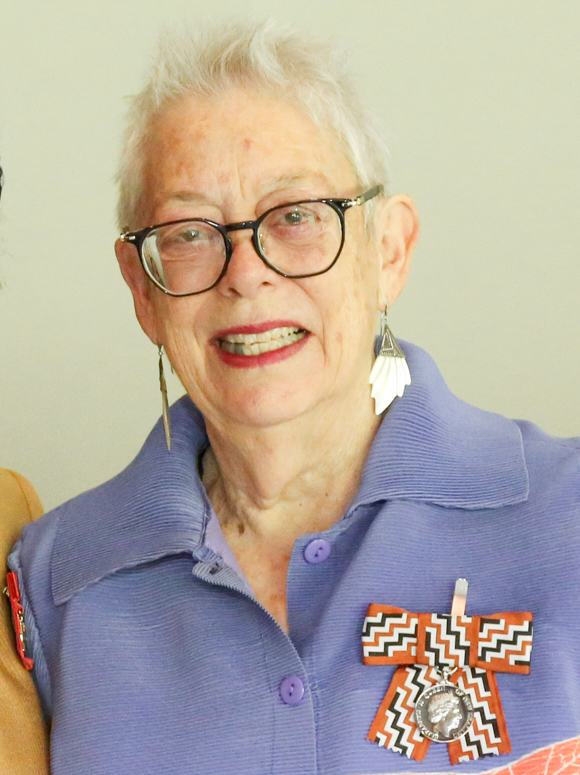
Susan Jordan

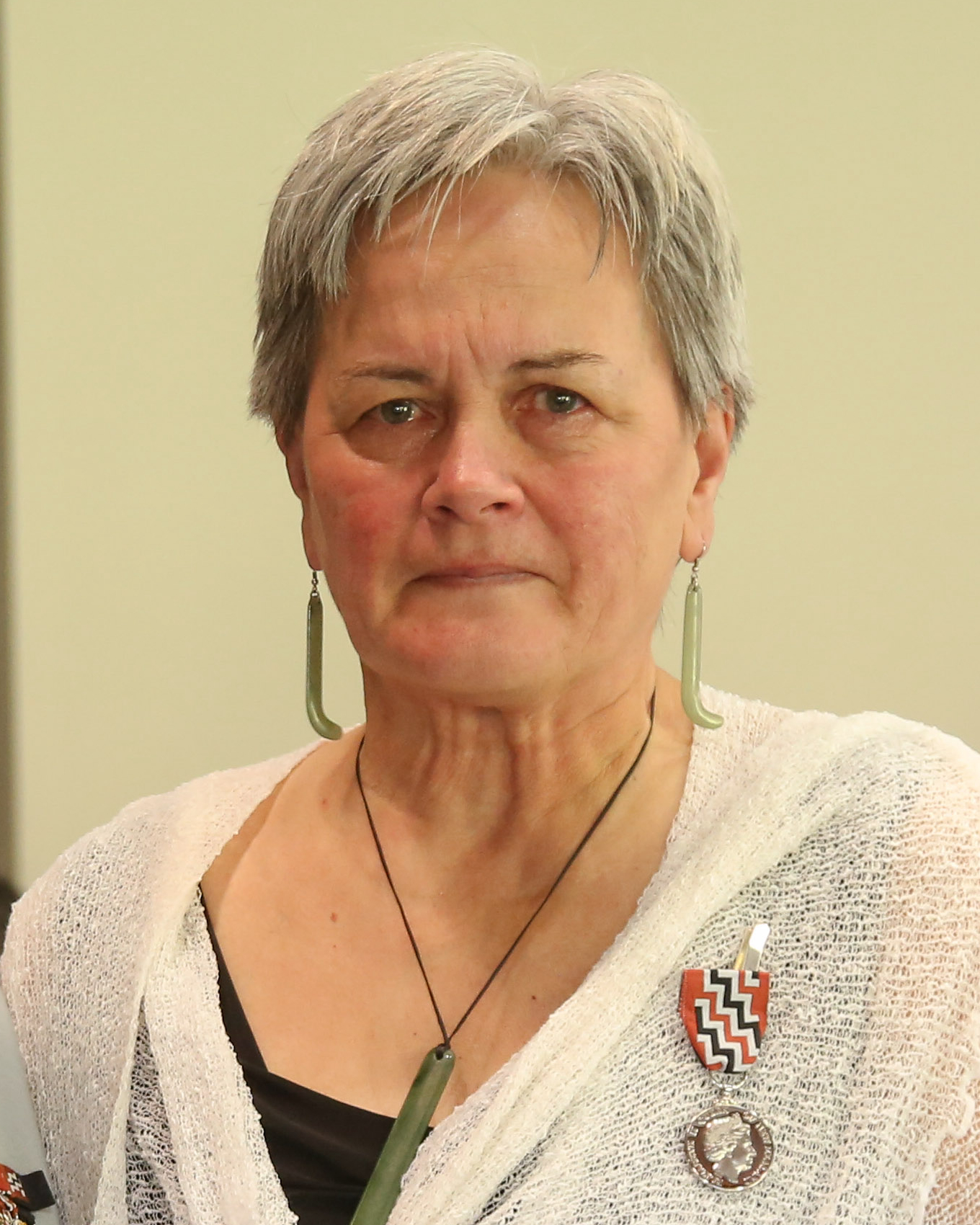
Rowena Tana

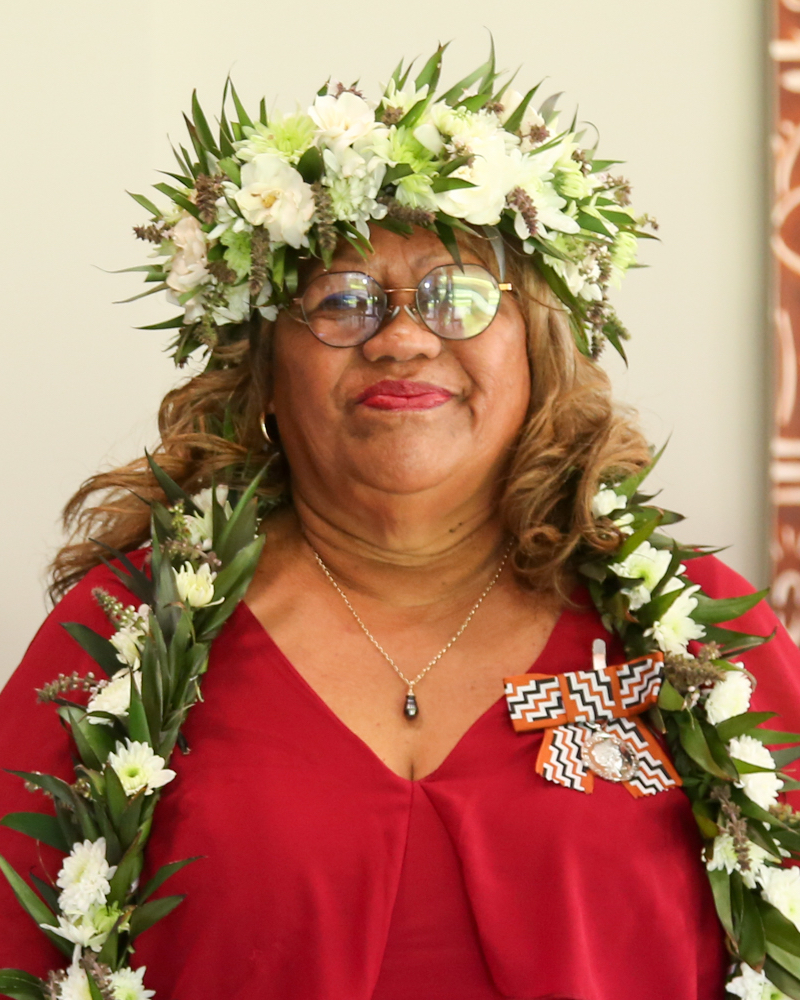
Rai Vaeruarangi

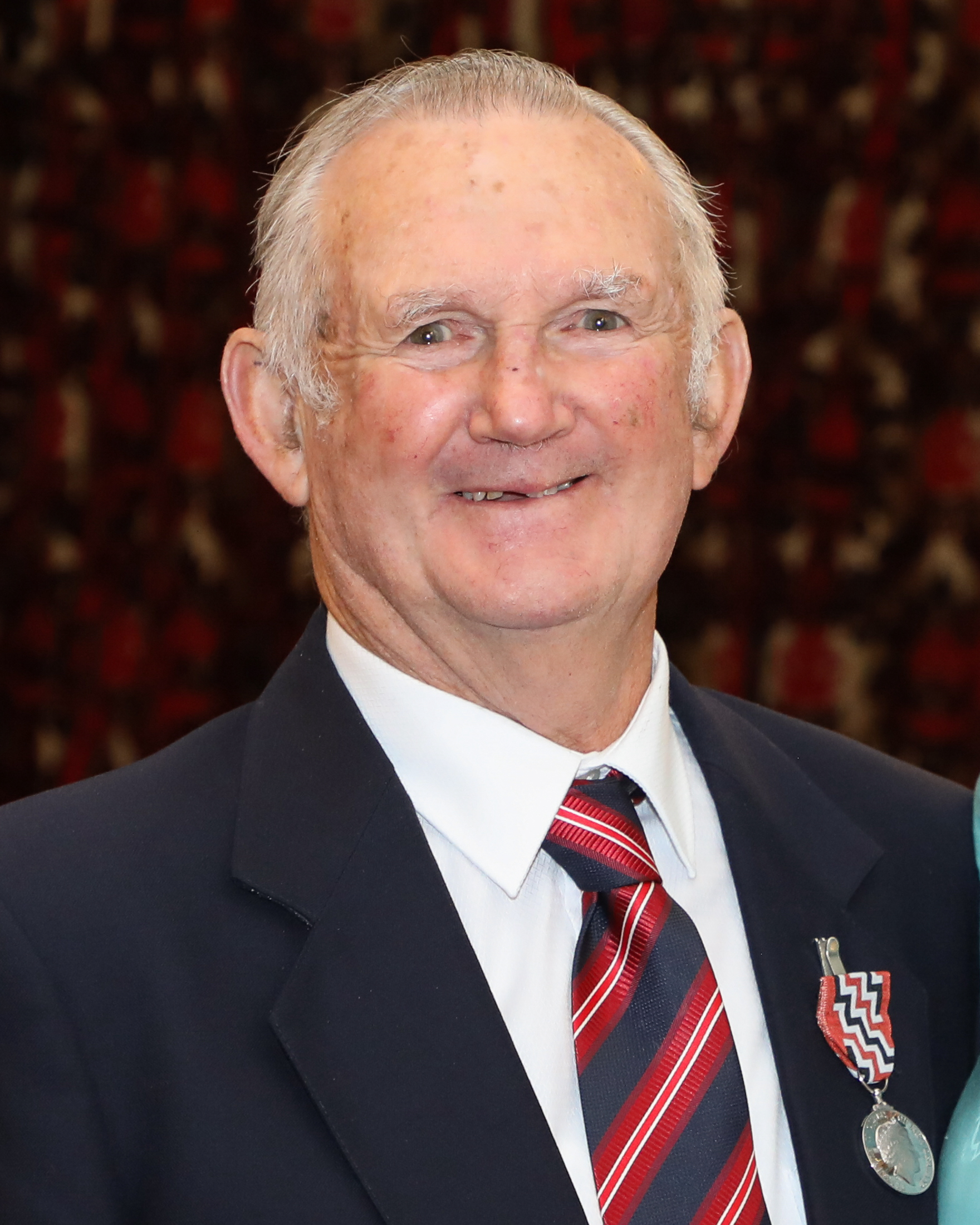
Neil Walker

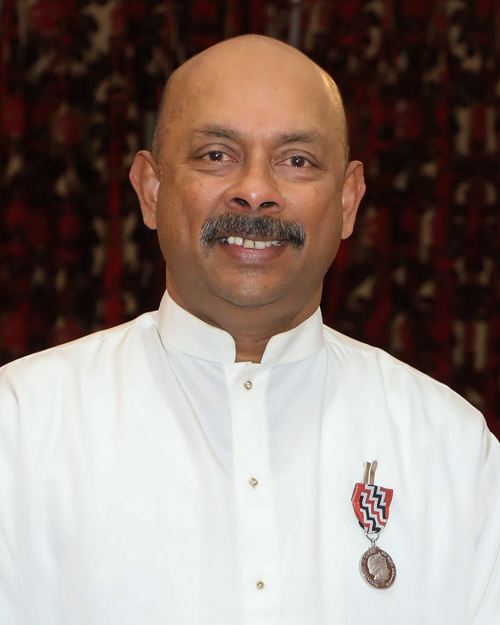
Athula Wanasinghe

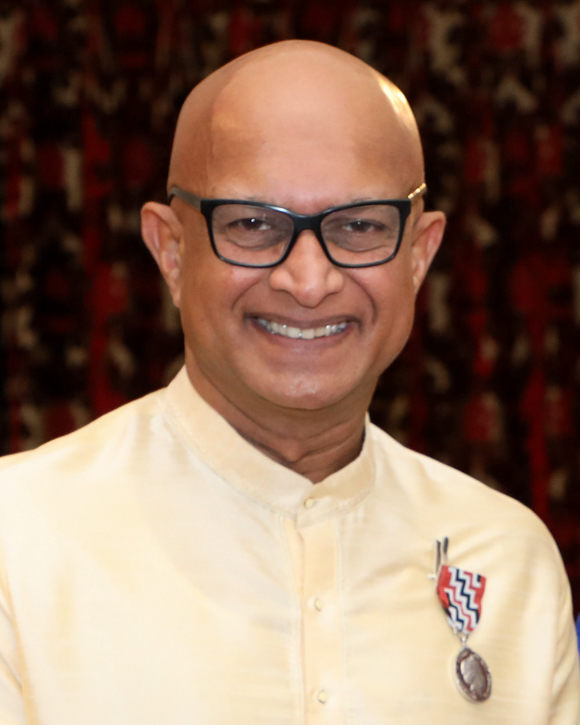
Sadun Kithulagoda

== New Zealand Antarctic Medal (NZAM) ==
- Dr Megan Ruby Balks – of Te Awamutu. For services to Antarctic soil science.
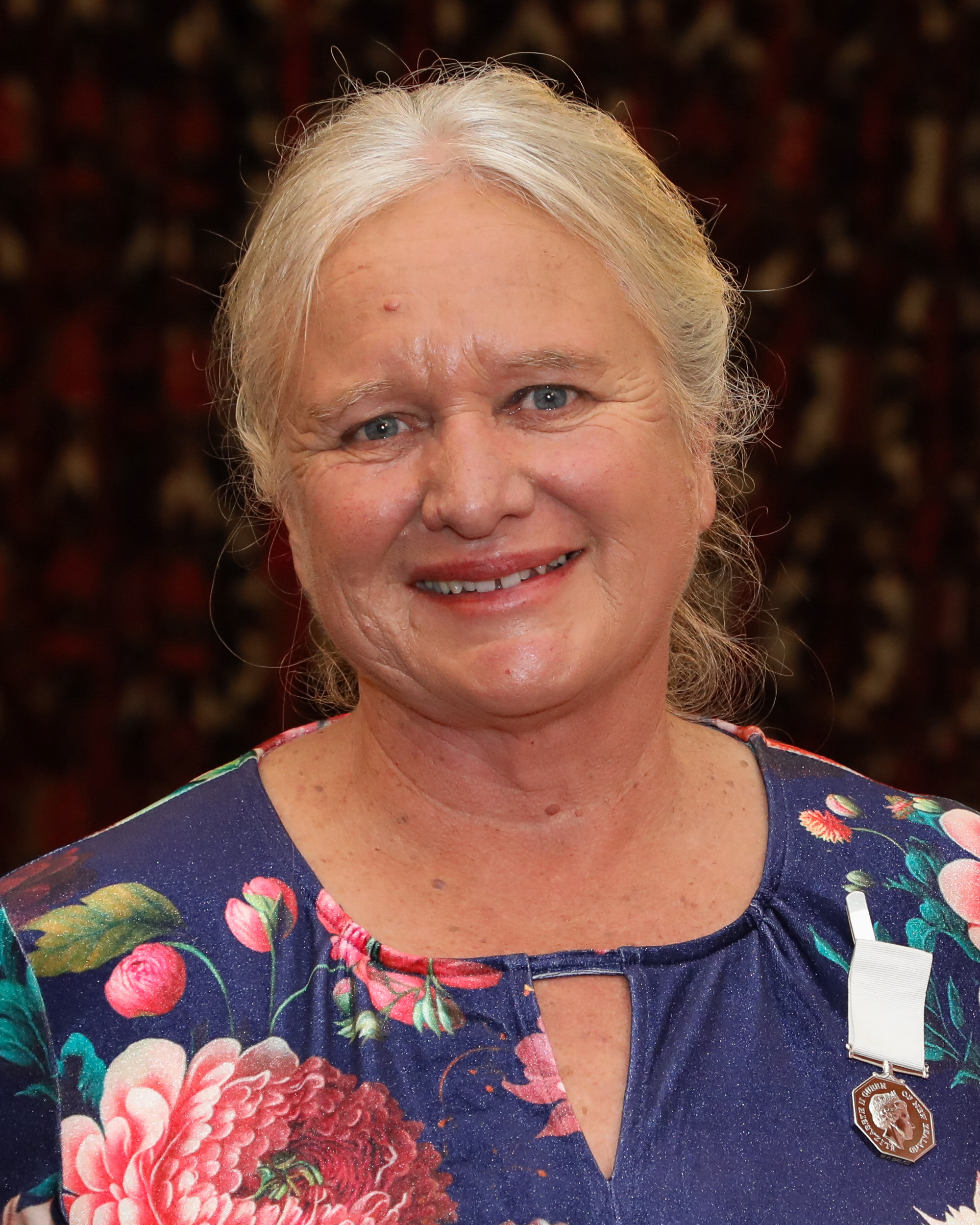
Megan Balks

== New Zealand Distinguished Service Decoration (DSD) ==
- Lieutenant Commander Louis James Munden-Hooper – of Auckland. For services to the New Zealand Defence Force.
- Lieutenant Commander Makoare Kohupara Te Kani MNZM – of Upper Hutt. For services to the New Zealand Defence Force.
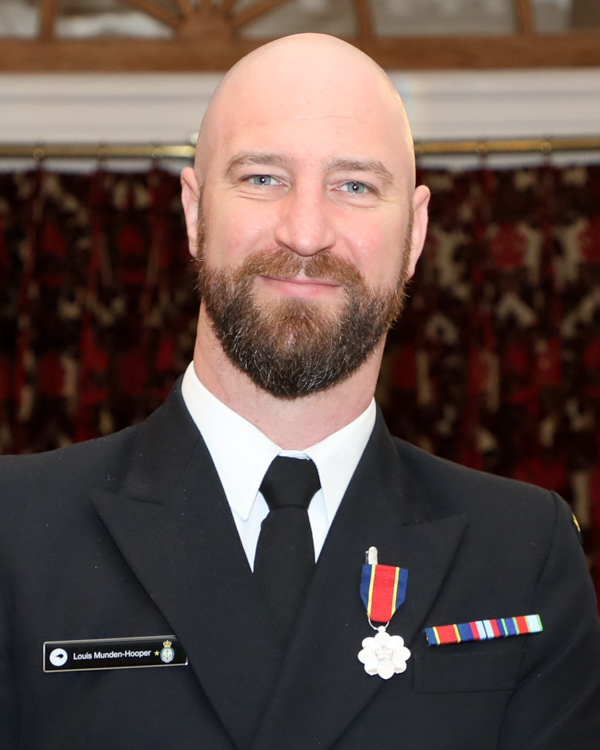
Louis Munden‑Hooper

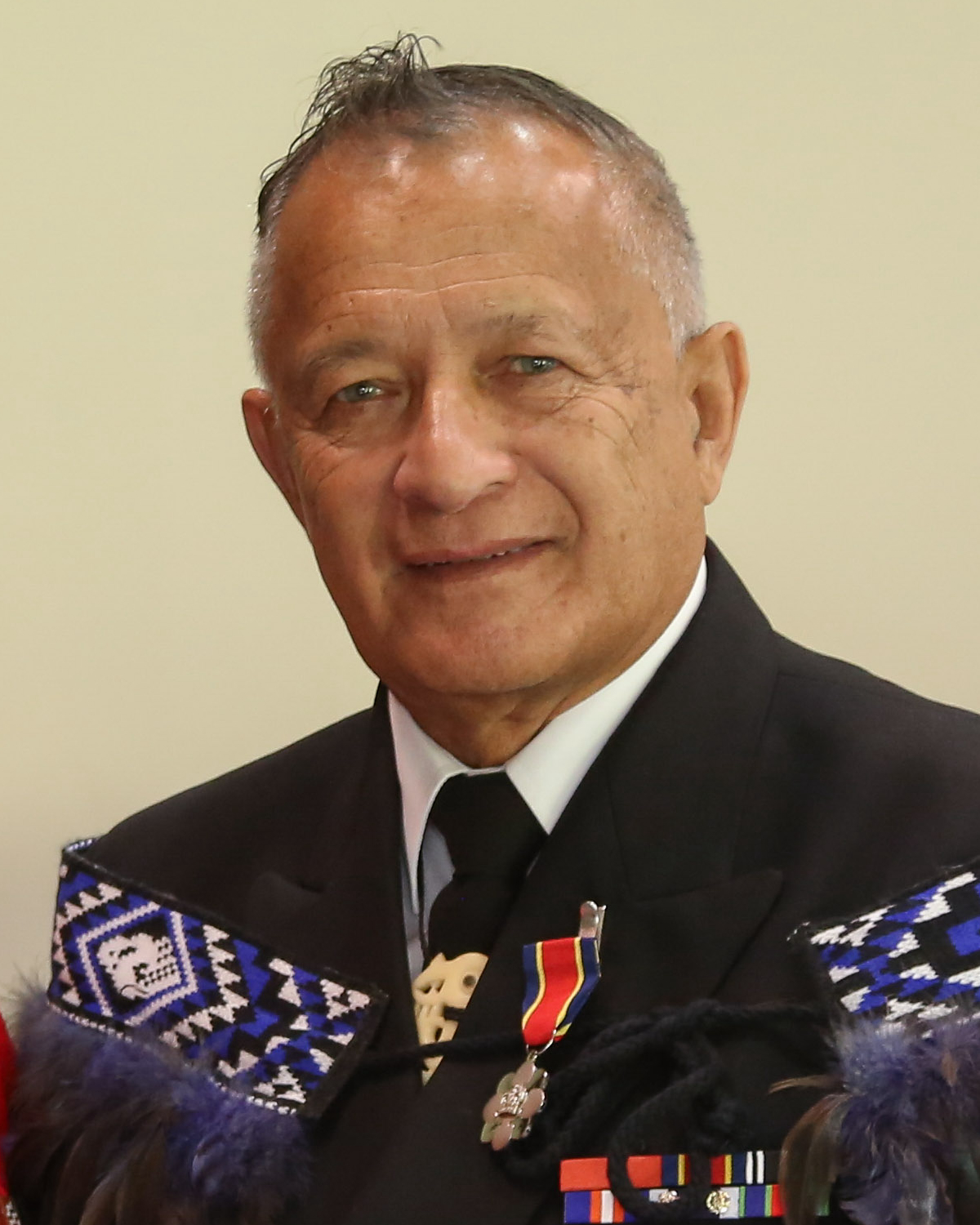
Mark Te Kani
