= Feijenoord =

Coordinates: 51.896°N 4.514°E

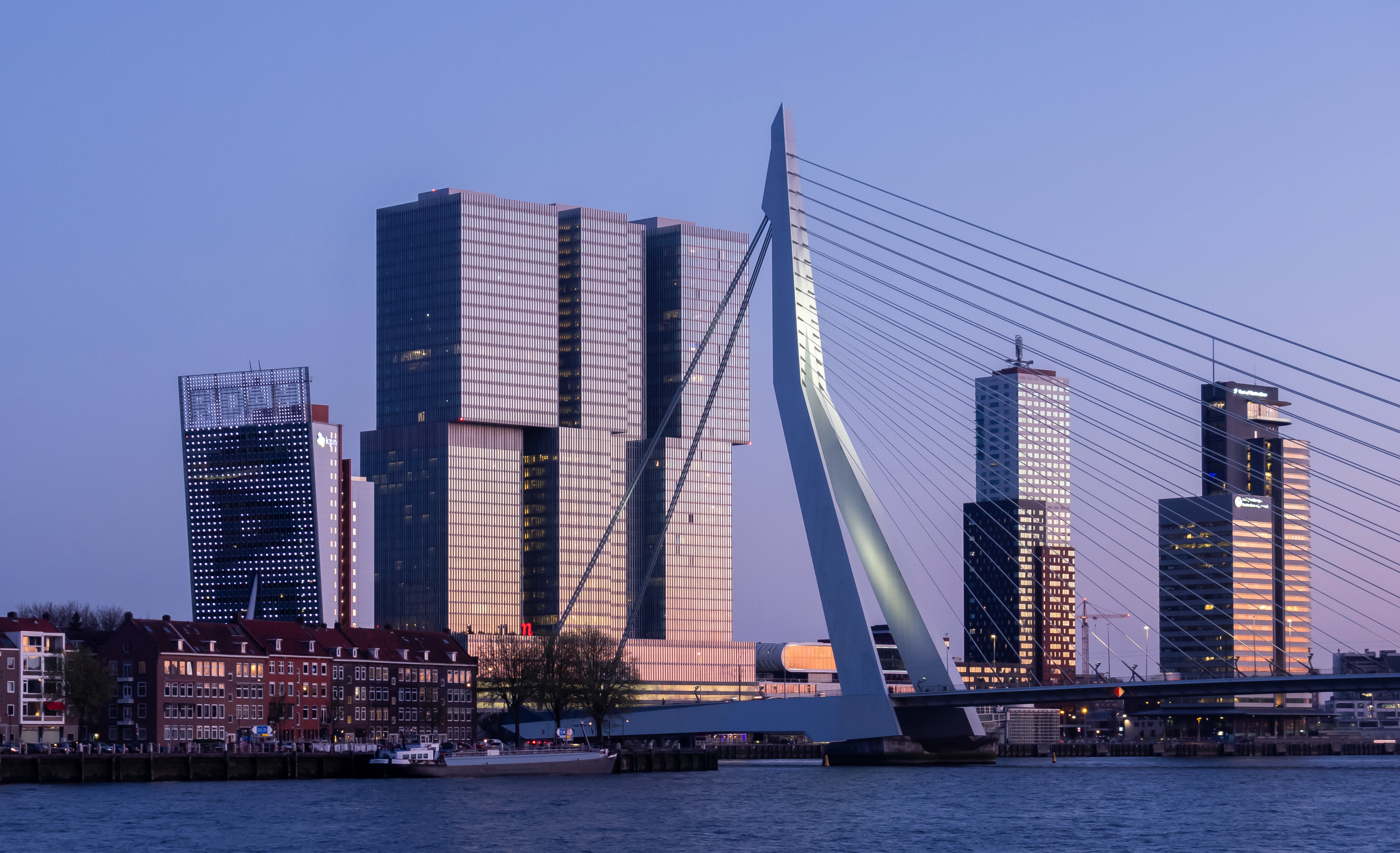
- Skyline of Kop van Zuid
- Interactive map of Feijenoord
- Country: Netherlands
- Province: South Holland
- City: Rotterdam

Area
  - Total: 2.49 sq mi (6.44 km^{2})

Population (2004)
  - Total: 72,320
  - Density: 37,540/sq mi (14,493/km^{2})
- Time zone: UTC+1 (CET)
- Website: www.rotterdam.nl/feijenoord

Feijenoord (Dutch pronunciation: [ˈfɛiənoːrt]) is a borough of Rotterdam in the Netherlands, south of the Nieuwe Maas. Feyenoord football club was formed there, but now play in the neighbouring township of IJsselmonde.

It was a centre of shipbuilding in the nineteenth century, principally at the Fijenoord yard.

== Neighbourhoods in Feijenoord ==
- Afrikaanderwijk
- Bloemhof
- Feijenoord
- Hillesluis
- Katendrecht
- Kop van Zuid
- Noordereiland
- Vreewijk

== Ethnicity ==
The majority of the population of Feijenoord is made up of immigrants. Approximately 36% are Dutch natives, 8% are Western immigrants and 56% are non-Western immigrants. The biggest non-Western immigrant groups are Moroccan (10%), Netherlands Antillean (4%), Surinamese (11%) and Turkish (19%).

== Problematic neighbourhoods ==
According to a list made by Eberhard van der Laan (State Secretary of infrastructure), four out of the eight neighbourhoods in Feijenoord are amongst the most problematic neighbourhoods in the Netherlands. The Bloemhof neighbourhood ranks at number 4 on the list, making it the most problematic neighbourhood in its district and the second in the south of Rotterdam, followed by Hillesluis at rank 13, Afrikaanderwijk at rank 33 and Vreewijk at rank 44.

== Poverty ==
Around 29% of the total population of Feijenoord lives on welfare, while the average for Rotterdam is 21%. Bloemhof and Hillesluis neighbourhoods have an unemployment rate above 40%, which is higher than the average for Rotterdam (13%) and the Netherlands (6%). 63% of the population of Feijenoord has a low level of educational attainment, compared to the Rotterdam average of 49%.

== Images ==
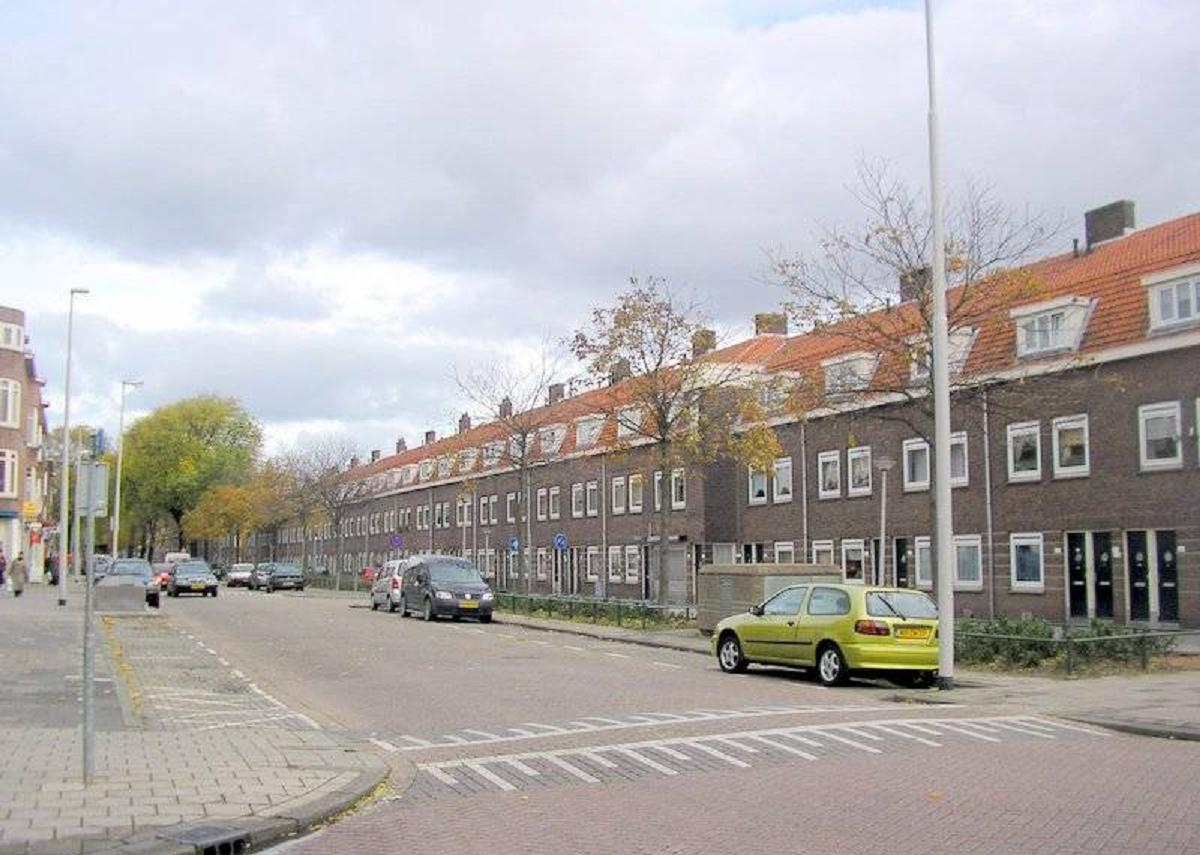
Putsebocht in Bloemhof

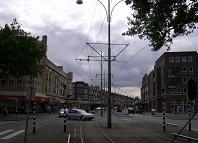
Beijerlandselaan in Hillesluis

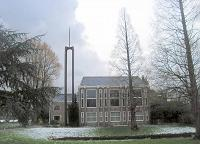
Latter-day Saint chapel in Vreewijk

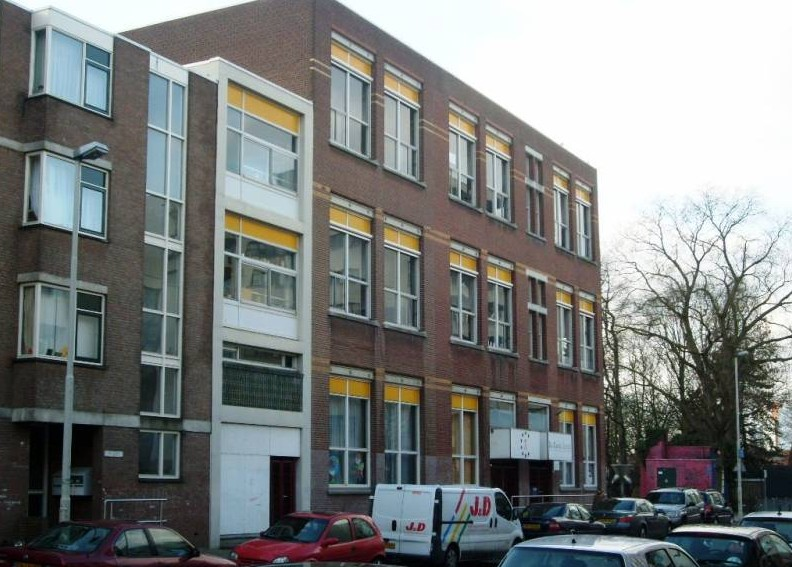
Protestant school in Afrikaanderwijk (1909)

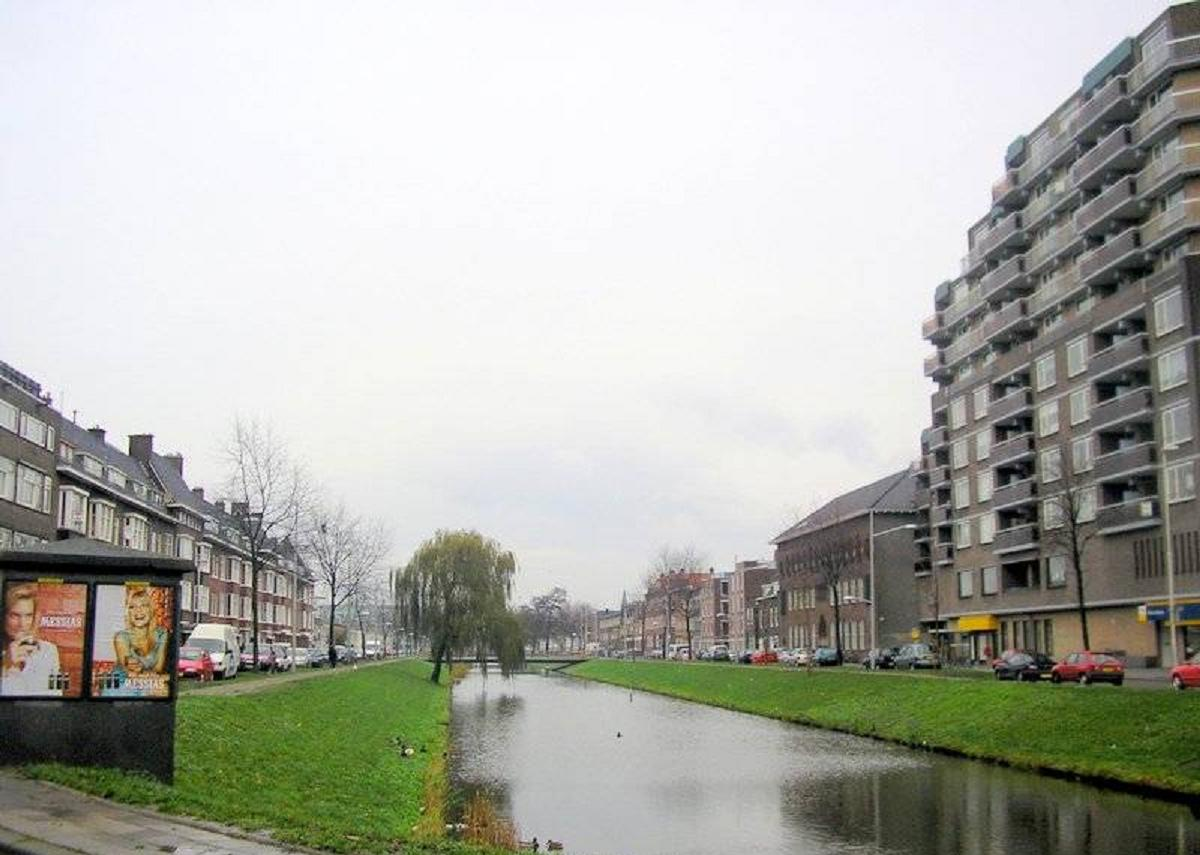
Lange Hilleweg in Bloemhof

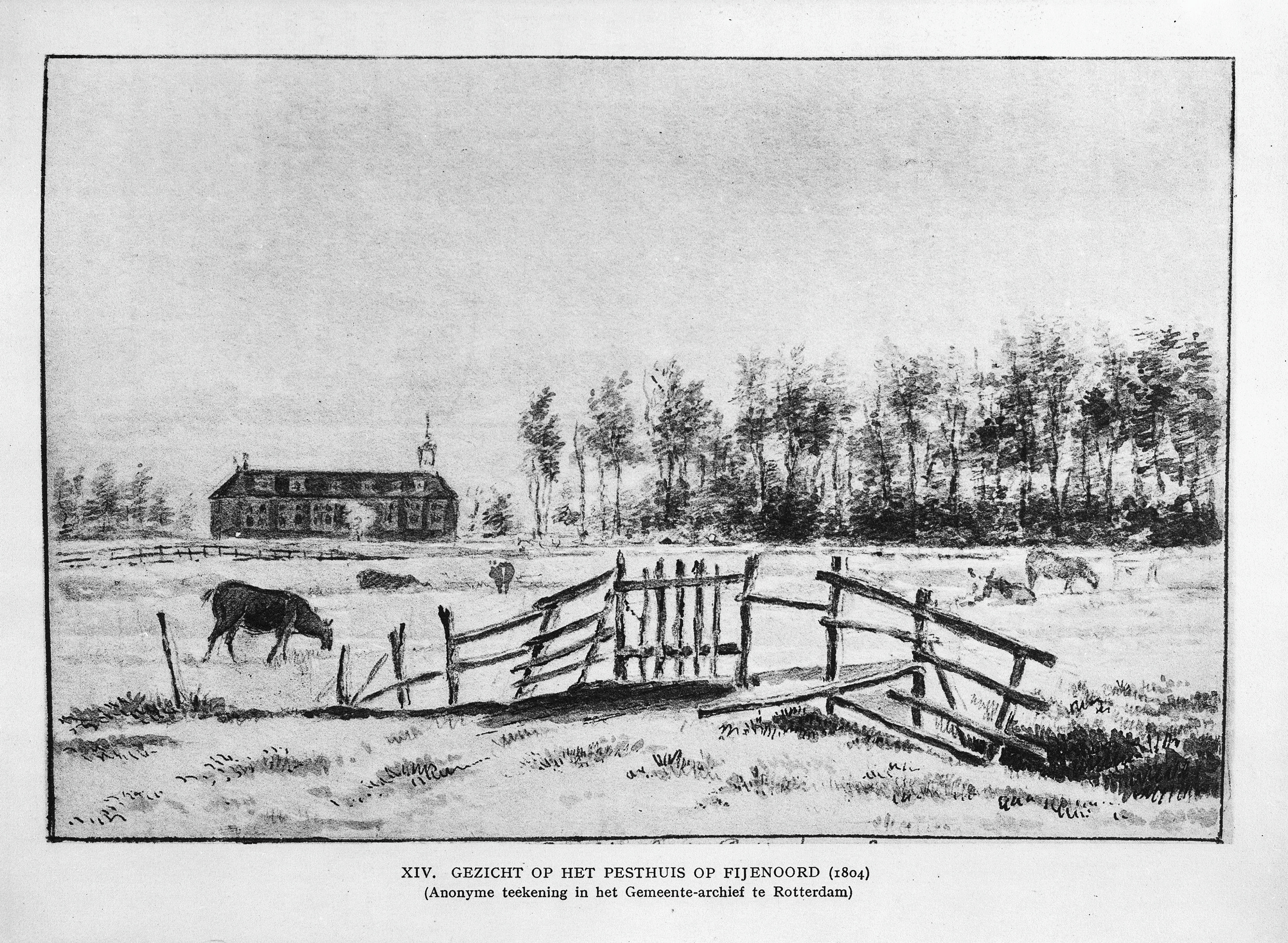
Pest house in Feijenoord neighbourhood (1804)

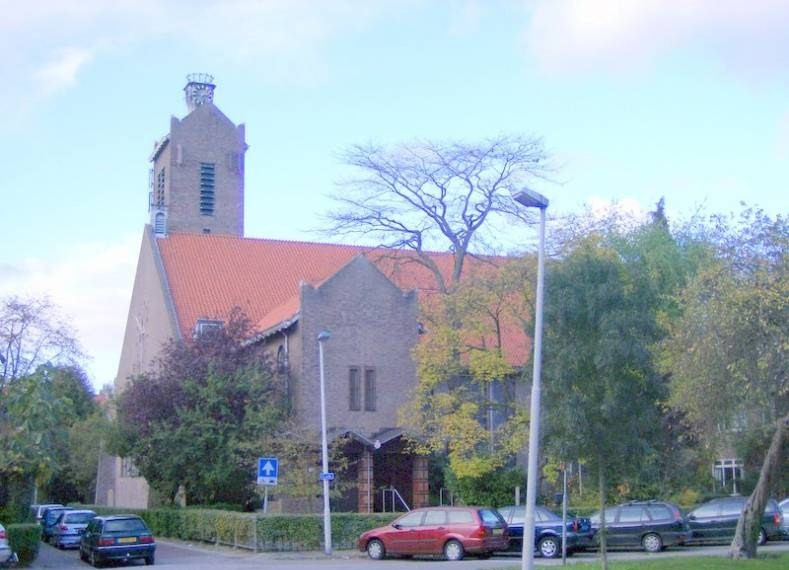
Orthodox church in Vreewijk
