= Ruben den Uil =

Dutch football manager (born 1991)

Personal information
- Date of birth: 3 February 1991 (age 35)
- Place of birth: Ede, Netherlands

Team information
- Current team: Excelsior (head coach)

Senior career*
Years	Team	Apps	(Gls)
2024–	SC Excelsior (futsal)		

Managerial career
- 2024–: Excelsior
- * Club domestic league appearances and goals

Ruben den Uil (born 3 February 1991) is a Dutch professional football manager who manages Eredivisie club Excelsior.

== Early years and education ==
Den Uil was born in Ede, Netherlands, and attended secondary school at Het Streek. He then studied at CIOS in Arnhem before completing a bachelor's degree in Sports Management & Entrepreneurship. Additionally, he obtained coaching diplomas from the KNVB.

== Coaching career ==
Den Uil began his coaching career as a youth coach at Ajax Cape Town before spending a year in Utrecht's youth academy. In 2015, he joined Sparta Rotterdam, where he coached various youth teams over six seasons. In 2021, he became an assistant coach at another Rotterdam-based club, Excelsior.

== Managerial career ==
After Excelsior's relegation from the Eredivisie at the end of the 2023–24 season, the club parted ways with head coach Marinus Dijkhuizen. On 28 June 2024, Den Uil was promoted to head coach, becoming the youngest manager in Dutch professional football at the time. He signed a contract through June 2026 and was assisted by the experienced Adrie Koster.

In his first season in charge, Den Uil guided Excelsior to a second-place finish in the Eerste Divisie, securing promotion back to the Eredivisie at the first attempt.

== Managerial statistics ==
As of match played 21 November 2026

Managerial record by team and tenure
Team	From	To	Record					Ref.
Team	From	To	P	W	D	L	Win %	Ref.
Excelsior	1 July 2024	Present	89	39	18	32	43.82	
Total			89	39	18	32	43.82	—
