= Vreeswijk (disambiguation) =

Vreeswijk was a village and municipality in the Dutch province of Utrecht, part of Nieuwegein since 1971.

Vreeswijk may also refer to:

- Cornelis Vreeswijk, Dutch-Swedish musician
- Jack Vreeswijk, Swedish musical artist

== See also ==
- Vreewijk
