= Spoonley =

Spoonley is a surname. Notable people with the surname include:

- Jacob Spoonley (born 1987), New Zealand association football goalkeeper
- Paul Spoonley (born 1954), New Zealand sociologist
