= Jan Rath =

Dutch social scientist

- Born: 13 June 1956 (age 70); Rotterdam, The Netherlands
- Citizenship: Dutch
- Education: Utrecht University
- Scientific career
- Fields: urban and migration sociology
- Workplaces: University of Amsterdam
- Thesis: Minorization: The Social Construction of 'Ethnic Minorities' (1991)
- Doctoral advisor: Frank Bovenkerk and Harry Hoetink
- Website: http://www.janrath.com

Jan Rath is a Dutch social scientist who used to hold a chair in Urban Sociology in the University of Amsterdam, the Netherlands. His academic studies have focused on the nexus of urban structures and processes on the one hand and their social, ethnic and religious dimensions on the other. His work is highly cited in the sub-fields related to the problematization of immigrant ethnic minorities, and on urban economies, entrepreneurship, and cultural consumption.

== Early life ==
Jan Rath was born in the city of Rotterdam, the Netherlands, and grew up in a lower-class family in Afrikaanderwijk and Hillesluis, both poor blue-color neighborhoods located close to the ports in the southern part of the city.

== Education and career ==
After attending secondary school, Rath spent two years doing all sorts of jobs (packing tomatoes, moving furniture, X-raying industrial installations, and counting bus passengers) and traveling. Thereafter, he decided to enroll in the anthropology and urban studies programs at Utrecht University. He received his MA degree in 1986 and his PhD degree in 1991 from the same university.

He held academic posts at the Center for the Study of Social Conflicts (COMT) in Leiden University (1982–1986), the Center for the Study of Multi-Ethnic Society (SMES) in Utrecht University (1986–1990), the Institute for the Sociology of Law in the Catholic University of Nijmegen (currently named Radboud University), (1990–1994). In 1994 he joined the University of Amsterdam. From 2000 to 2005, he was associate director of UvA's Institute for Migration and Ethnic Studies (IMES). In 2005, Rath became IMES’ Academic Director (till Spring 2011). From 2010 to 2015, Rath was the chair of the combined Department of Sociology and Anthropology and he also acted as the Chair of the Faculty's Domain of Social Sciences. From 2018 to 2020, he served again as the Chair of the Department of Sociology. Rath is a Researcher in the Center for Urban Studies and the Institute for Migration and Ethnic Studies (IMES), both in the Amsterdam Institute for Social Science Research (AISSR). He was the President of UvA's University Forum, that aims to facilitate intellectual debate about the UvA, its values and strategies, and its future.

In between, he was a visiting scholar at the University of California Los Angeles (UCLA), Massey University in Auckland, New Zealand, and Koç University and NIT in Istanbul. Moreover, during his fellowship at the Netherlands Institute of Advanced Study (NIAS-KNAW), he was appointed as the holder of the Prof. dr. J.A.A. van Doorn Chair at the Erasmus University of Rotterdam.

Moreover, he has been the Chair of Metropolis International, a member of the IMISCOE Research Network, an associate of the World Economic Forum, and a member of the advisory board of the Centre on Migration, Policy, and Society (COMPAS) within the University of Oxford. He has been an advisor of a wide array of local, national and supranational governmental organizations and civic society institutions, including the European Commission (notably DG Enterprise and Industry), OECD, OSCE, and United Nations (notably IOM, UNHCR, UNCTAD, and the Population Division).

== Career and thought ==
Trained in anthropology and urban studies, Jan Rath ventured out into various other disciplines, such as political science, sociology of law, economic sociology, and cultural and economic geography.

=== Racism, discrimination, problematizing the Other ===
In the early phases of his career, Rath positioned himself in the international debate on racism and discrimination. At the time, many students of racism put the colonial model central in their considerations and assumed that the only or the most important racism is that which has black people as its object. Rath, however, following the British sociologist Robert Miles, proposed to take the formation of the nation state as a starting point for the theoretical understanding of the nature and meaning of racism in present-day Europe. A key process then is the construction of the imagined community of the nation. Racism could be one of the ideologies that constitute that process, as is plain from the French and British cases. In each case, sections of the population were ideologically excluded from the imagined community on the grounds of the negative evaluation of racialized features, while the remaining members of society were ideologically included on the grounds of the positive evaluation of them. Racialized features pertained to real or alleged biological characteristics of people or their cultural characteristics for as far as they were considered as fixed, naturalized. But the process of nation-state formation is historically specific. In each nation state specific criteria apply which determine who does and who does not belong to the imagined community of the nation. As Rath convincingly demonstrated, the Dutch case shows that the problematization of (non-immigrant) anti-social families or immigrant ethnic minorities is not necessarily an expression of racism in the strict sense of the term. Anti-social families and ethnic minorities—both constituting fractions of the lowest social classes—were seen by the rest of society as people with life styles deviating from that of the middle class ideal type, as people who did not adequately conform to the dominant norms of normal behavior, as backward people with a pre-modern life style. The dominant ideological representation of these categories apparently revolved around real or alleged socio-cultural features. That is why they were not represented as races apart but as minorities apart. The crux is that in the Dutch case these socio-cultural features are not regarded as fixed or naturalized. As a matter of fact, the state and private institutions had done their utmost to integrate and assimilate these people, in other words, to change them.

=== Entrepreneurship, small business development ===
In a later phase, Rath together with the economic geographer Robert Kloosterman and colleagues, he developed the mixed embeddedness approach to the study of small (ethnic) entrepreneurship. The ‘mixed embeddedness’ approach is an attempt to develop a theory that combines agency factors with structural conditions in a meaningful way. More concretely, it explicitly combines personal and group factors with market conditions and regulatory matters. Each market requires a specific set of skills, competences, and resources: selling kebab or game technology, for instance, constitute totally different worlds, the latter being inaccessible for uneducated entrepreneurs. The entrepreneurs’ set of skills, competences, and resources consequently funnels them to specific markets, growing and shrinking markets alike. This means that the social, economic and political positionality of individual entrepreneurs is crucial for our understanding of their business activities, notably the obstacles and opportunities that are involved. Rath applied this approach in the international comparative study of the immigrant garment sector, but also in his research on the transformation of ethnic neighborhoods into places of leisure and consumption and his more recent work on commercial gentrification.

== Selected publications ==
=== Journal articles ===
- Hagemans, I., A. Hendriks, J. Rath and S. Zukin (2015) ‘From greengrocers to cafés. Producing social diversity in Amsterdam’, pp. 90–119 in S. Zukin, Ph. Kasinitz and X. Chen, and research partners. Global Cities, Local Streets: Everyday Diversity from New York to Shanghai. New York: Routledge.
- Hiebert, D., J. Rath & S. Vertovec (2014) ‘Urban Markets and Diversity: Toward a Research Agenda’, Ethnic and Racial Studies. 38 (1), pp. 5–21, DOI: 10.1080/01419870.2014.953969
- Hiebert, D., J. Rath & S. Vertovec (2014) Urban Markets and Diversity: Toward a Research Agenda. MMG Working Paper 14–06. Göttingen: Max Planck Institute for the Study of Religious and Ethnic Diversity.
- Kloosterman, R. and J. Rath (2014) ‘Immigrant Entrepreneurship ’, pp. 195–225 in M. Martiniello and J. Rath (eds), An Introduction to Immigrant Incorporation Studies. European Perspectives. IMISCOE Textbook Series 3. Amsterdam: Amsterdam University Press.
- Rath, J, (2009) ‘The Netherlands. A reluctant country of immigration’, Tijdschrift voor Economische en Sociale Geografie, 100 (5), pp. 665–672. DOI: 10.1111/j.1467-9663.2009.00579.x

=== Books and special issues ===
- Martiniello, M. and J. Rath (eds) (2014) An Introduction to Immigrant Incorporation Studies: European Perspectives. IMISCOE Textbook Series 3. Amsterdam: Amsterdam University Press.
- Foner, N., J. Rath, J.W. Duyvendak and R. van Reekum (eds) (2014) New York and Amsterdam. Immigration and the New Urban Landscape. New York: New York University Press.
- Martiniello, M. and J. Rath (eds) (2012) An Introduction to International Migration Studies: European Perspectives. IMISCOE Textbook Series 2. Amsterdam; Amsterdam University Press.
- Aytar, V. and J. Rath (eds) (2012) Selling Ethnic Neighborhoods: The Rise of Neighborhoods as Places of Leisure and Consumption. New York: Routledge. Routledge Advances in Geography Series.
- Martiniello, M. and J. Rath (eds) (2010) Selected Studies in International Migration and Immigrant Incorporation. IMISCOE Textbook Series 1. Amsterdam: Amsterdam University Press.
- Nell, L. and J. Rath (eds) (2009) Ethnic Amsterdam. Immigrants and Urban Change in the Twentieth Century. Solidarity and Identity Series. Amsterdam: Amsterdam University Press.
- Rath, J. (ed) (2007) Tourism, Ethnic Diversity and the City. (Contemporary Geographies of Leisure, Tourism and Mobility Series). London and New York: Routledge.
