= Cherie Chu-Fuluifaga =

New Zealand leadership trainer and lecturer

Associate Professor Cherie Chu-Fuluifaga ONZM
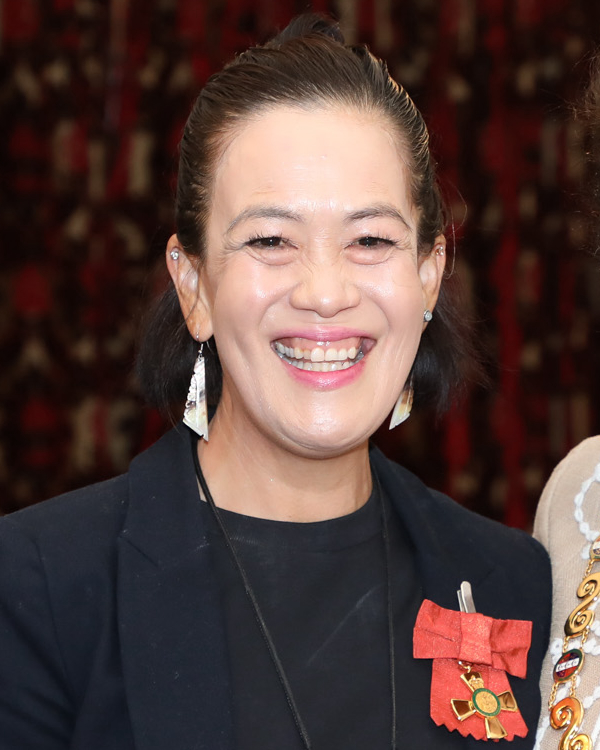
- Other name: Cherie Chu
- Awards: Officer of the New Zealand Order of Merit

Academic background
- Education: Victoria University of Wellington (MA, PhD)
- Thesis: Mentoring for Leadership in Pacific Education (2009)
- Doctoral advisor: Kabini Sanga, Jenny Neale

Academic work
- Institutions: Victoria University of Wellington

Cherie Maria Chu-Fuluifaga ONZM is a Chinese Tahitian New Zealand academic, and is a senior lecturer in education at Victoria University of Wellington. In 2024, Chu-Fuluifaga was appointed an Officer of the New Zealand Order of Merit for services to education.

== Academic career ==
Chu-Fuluifaga is of Samoan, Chinese and Tahitian heritage. Her mother was a cleaner and her father did not attend school. Despite saying she struggled and 'felt invisible' at school, and a career counsellor suggesting she train as a secretary, Chu-Fuluifaga went on to complete a PhD titled Mentoring for Leadership in Pacific Education at Victoria University of Wellington in 2009.

Chu-Fuluifaga joined the faculty of the School of Education at the university in 2003. Between 2005 and 2020, she grew the Pacific education leadership cluster from an initial five students to more than 200, one of the largest cohorts of Pacific students in the country. She established mentoring programmes in Humanities and Commerce at the university, and run cultural training programmes for professions including lawyers and midwives. Chu-Fuluifaga was the director of Victoria's Bachelor of Arts in Education from 2009 to 2011, and she is also a researcher at tertiary education support organisation Ako Aotearoa.

Chu-Fuluifaga volunteers at the Graeme Dingle Foundation, which promotes life skills and wellbeing in young people through New Zealand.

== Honours and awards ==
In the 2024 New Year Honours, Chu-Fuluifaga was appointed an Officer of the New Zealand Order of Merit for services to education. Chu-Fuluifaga was a finalist in the education category for Wellingtonian of the Year in 2024.

== Selected works ==
- Kidman, Joanna; Chu, Cherie Maria (2017). "Scholar Outsiders in the Neoliberal University: Transgressive Academic Labour in the Whitestream". New Zealand Journal of Educational Studies. 52 (1): 7–19. doi:10.1007/s40841-017-0079-y. Wikidata Q127689468.
- Chu, Cherie Maria (2017). "Pasifika". Encyclopedia of Educational Philosophy and Theory: 1768–1772. doi:10.1007/978-981-287-588-4_11. Wikidata Q127689469.
