= Afrikaanderplein =

Football ground in Rotterdam, Netherlands

- Interactive map of Afrikaanderplein
- Full name: Afrikaanderplein
- Location: Rotterdam, the Netherlands
- Coordinates: 51.899954°N 4.50111°E
- Capacity: 1.500
- Surface: grass

Construction
- Opened: 1908
- Closed: 1917

Tenants
- Excelsior (1907–1908); Feyenoord (1908–1917)

Afrikaanderplein was a football ground in Rotterdam, the Netherlands. It was the first home of the professional football club Feyenoord – then known as Wilhelmina (1908–09), HFC (1909), Celeritas (1909–12) and eventually Feijenoord – from its foundation in 1908 until 1917, when the club moved to a new ground at the Kromme Zandweg.

Before the foundation of Feyenoord, fellow Rotterdam club Excelsior played its matches on the Afrikaanderplein in the season 1907–08, after which the club returned to Woudestein.
