= Afrikaanderwijk =

Coordinates: 51°54′00″N 4°30′06″E

- Neighborhood
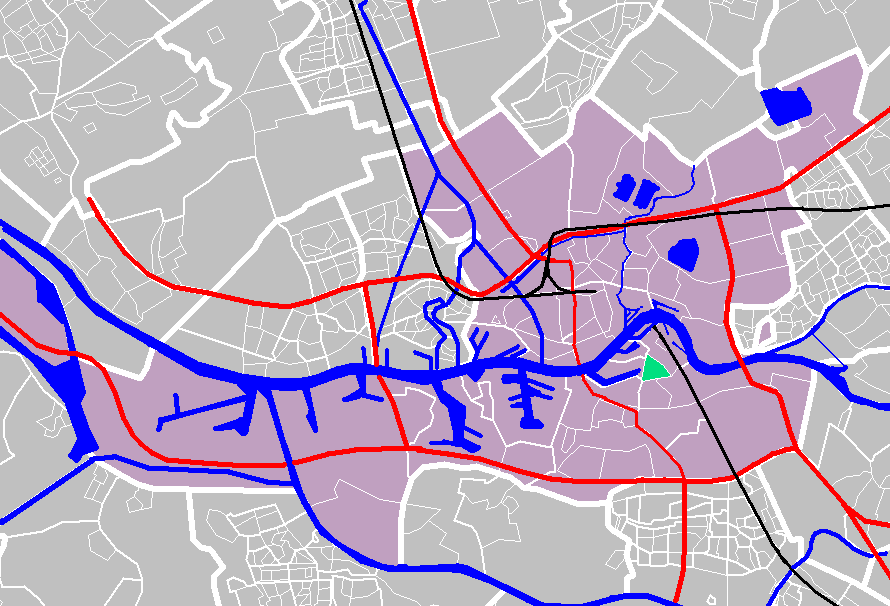
- Country: Netherlands
- Province: South Holland
- COROP: Rotterdam
- Borough: Feijenoord
- Time zone: UTC+1 (CET)

Afrikaanderwijk is a neighborhood of Rotterdam, Netherlands. It lies in the Feijenoord district of the city, and is traditionally a working-class neighborhood. The neighborhood was one of the first in the Netherlands to have a majority of residents with a foreign background, primarily consisting of Turks, Moroccans, Surinamese, and Antilleans.

== History ==
The neighborhood came into existence around the year 1900 when docks were built in Rotterdam-Zuid, and is one of the residential areas that quickly sprang up to house dockworkers. The name comes from the pattern of street names in the neighborhood, which are based on South African geography in general (e.g., the Bloemfonteinstraat and the Pretorialaan) and on Afrikaner leaders from the Second Boer War (e.g., the Paul Krugerstraat).

From 1908 to 1917, the soccer club Feyenoord used the Afrikaanderplein in the center of their neighborhood as their home.

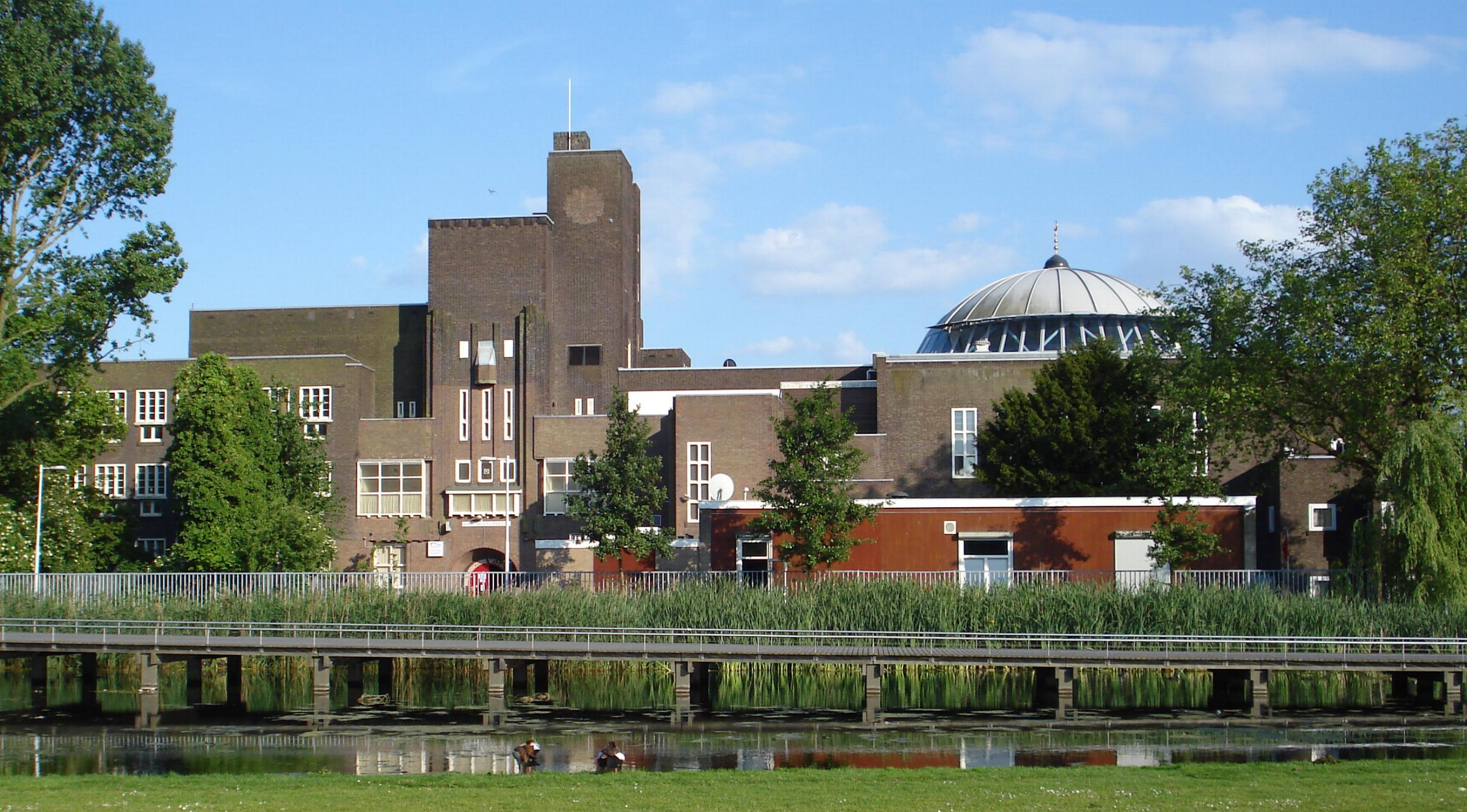
The former Johan van Oldenbarnevelt school on the Afrikaanderplein

The Rotterdam Tramway Company (Dutch: Rotterdamsche Tramweg Maatschappij), predecessor of the current RET system, ran a line to the South Holland islands through the neighborhood until the 1970s. Because of the number of accidents that occurred on the lines, particularly in crowded neighborhoods like the Afrikaanderwijk, earned the line the nickname of "the murderer" (Dutch: de moordenaar or het moordenaartje).

As greater numbers of immigrants moved to the neighborhood to work in the dockyards in the early 1970s, tensions mounted in the neighborhood. In particular, "slumlords" were accused of renting rooms to migrant workers despite the fact that many native Dutch had been waiting for apartments for years. On August 10, 1972, these tensions flared and neighborhood residents came into immigrant occupied boarding houses, throwing these residents and their belongings into the street. This event is known as the Afrikaanderwijk riots. Despite response by riot police, disturbances lasted for three days. The city responded to these with a new policy limiting the number of foreign residents in a neighborhood. The national government issued a stay on this policy the next year, however, and it was overturned in 1974 by the Dutch Council of State.
