= Maarten Grobbe =

Dutch footballer

Personal information
- Full name: Martent Grobbe
- Date of birth: 7 September 1901
- Place of birth: Zwolle, Netherlands
- Date of death: 13 May 1961 (aged 59)
- Place of death: Rotterdam, Netherlands
- Position: Central defender

Senior career*
Years	Team	Apps	(Gls)
1922–1932	Excelsior		

International career
1928–1929	Netherlands	2	(1)
- * Club domestic league appearances and goals

Maarten Grobbe (7 September 1901 – 13 May 1961) was a Dutch footballer. He played in two matches for the Netherlands national football team from 1928 to 1929.

Born in Zwolle, Grobbe came to Rotterdam in the early 1920s and made his debut for Excelsior in September 1922 against ZFC. He played 196 matches for their senior team.

Grobbe is one of only four Excelsior players who made it to the Oranje and was the first player from Zwolle to do so.
