= Excelsior Rotterdam =

Dutch football club

Excelsior
- Full name: Excelsior Rotterdam
- Nicknames: The Kralingers; Roodzwarten (red-blacks); The Wonder; Oud papier-club (Paper recycling club)
- Founded: 23 July 1902; 124 years ago
- Ground: Stadion Woudestein
- Capacity: 4,500
- Chairman: Bob de Lange
- Head coach: Ruben den Uil
- League: Eredivisie
- 2025–26: Eredivisie, 13th of 18
- Website: excelsiorrotterdam.nl
Home colours	Away colours

Excelsior Rotterdam (Dutch pronunciation: [ɛkˈsɛlsijɔr rɔtərˈdɑm]), commonly known as Excelsior, is a Dutch professional football club based in Rotterdam. Founded on 23 July 1902, it competes in the Eredivisie, the highest tier of the Dutch football league system. The team plays its home matches at Stadion Woudestein, which has a capacity of approximately 4,500, making it one of the smallest stadiums used by professional clubs in the Netherlands.

Excelsior has spent much of its history fluctuating between the top two divisions, achieving multiple promotions and relegations. The club's most notable periods of sustained top-flight presence occurred in the early 2010s and again in the early 2020s. Known for its long-standing partnership with Feyenoord, from which it has frequently received loaned players, Excelsior has developed a reputation for nurturing young talent. The club's local rivalry with Sparta Rotterdam is a regular feature of Rotterdam football.

== History ==
=== Early history ===
Excelsior was officially formed on 23 July 1902 as Rotterdamse Voetbal en Atletiek Vereniging Excelsior (English: Rotterdam Football and Athletics Club Excelsior). The initial founders of the club, a group of close friends located in the Kralingen district of Rotterdam, started playing football matches on the fields of the eighteenth century buitenplaats Woudesteyn. After the actual establishment of the club, the municipality officially gave permission to use the land. As football was still an elite sport at the beginning of the 20th century, Excelsior became one of the first working class clubs in the Netherlands.

=== First successes ===
In the season 1945–46, Excelsior gained their first success by promoting to the Eerste Klasse, the highest tier of Dutch football before professional football was introduced in 1954. The deciding match against VUC was played in De Kuip and attracted 52.000 spectators. Excelsior relegated in the next season, but managed to promote for the second time in the season 1951–52. After the introduction of professional football, Excelsior won the Eerste Divisie championship three times (1974, 1979 and 2006) and promoted to the Eredivisie various times, usually to relegate not long afterwards.

Excelsior once reached the KNVB Cup final in the season 1929–30, but lost the match to fellow Rotterdam club Feyenoord (0–1). Excelsior's biggest pre-war achievement was the win of the Zilveren Bal trophy. Excelsior beat Feyenoord (5–0) in the finals of the highly rated pre-season tournament.

=== Founding father of Dutch professional football ===
In the mid-fifties, Excelsior were the leading club behind the introduction of professional football in the Netherlands. When the KNVB continued to refuse payments in football, Excelsior chairman Henk Zon and board member Aad Libregts managed to persuade association president Hans Hopster, in cooperation with the directors of Feyenoord, Sparta and ADO Den Haag. In August 1954 the KNVB accepted the proposal and professional football was introduced in the Netherlands.

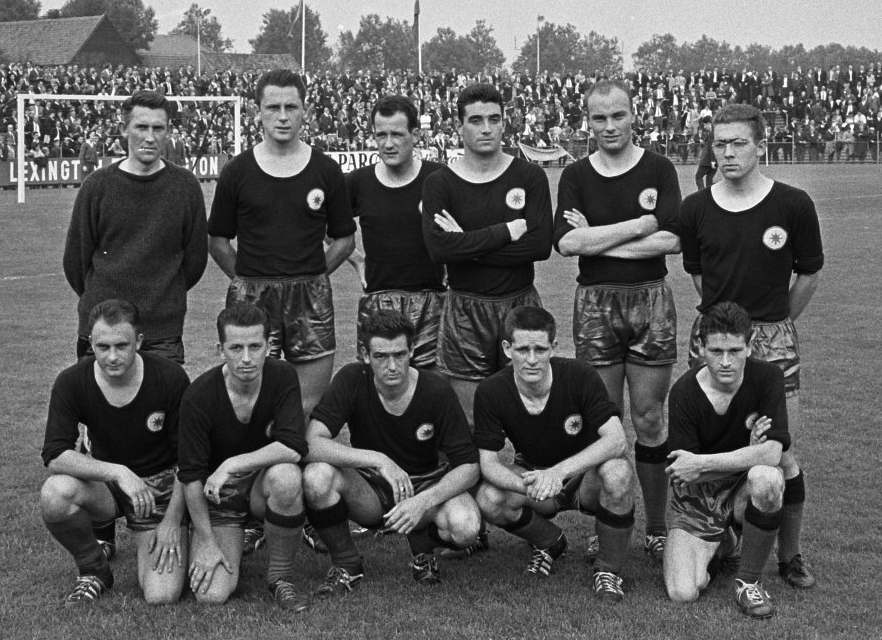
Excelsior in the 1963–64 Season

=== Pioneers ===
Being the smallest professional club in Rotterdam, Excelsior always had to be creative to survive. This creativity made Excelsior play a pioneering role within Dutch football. In 1958 Excelsior became the first Dutch club with covered stands. Later, in 1974, Excelsior also were the first Dutch club with shirt advertising. Against the then existing rules, the club put an 'A' on the shirt. The character was supposed to stand for 'Team A', but in reality it stood for Akai, the company of main investor Rob Albers. The KNVB decided to ban the 'A' from the shirt and it would take until 1982 for shirt advertising to be introduced. Akai would adorn the shirts of Excelsior until the season 1999–00.

=== Millennium ===
In 2002, the year in which the club was officially 100 years old, Excelsior returned to the Eredivisie. They did this after spending more than 20 years in the second tier of Dutch football. They were relegated after one season. In the 2005/2006 season Excelsior became champions of the Eerste Divisie and were promoted back to the Eredivisie once again.

Between 1997 and 2005 Excelsior had a partnership with Rotterdam rivals Feyenoord. Excelsior became Feyenoord's satellite club. As such, Feyenoord gave Excelsior money and players (either on loan or free transfer).

A majority of the Excelsior fans have always been against a partnership with Feyenoord. Michel van der Neut, chairman of Excelsior's supporters club, claimed: "Excelsior sold her soul with the extended partnership. Excelsior simply stops existing this way."

=== Promotion–relegation cycle and consolidation (2010–2019) ===
Excelsior returned to the Eredivisie in 2010 after defeating city rivals Sparta Rotterdam in the promotion–relegation play-offs. The decisive goal was scored by Guyon Fernandez deep into stoppage time, only minutes after Sparta had taken the lead. Coached by Alex Pastoor, the squad was largely composed of loanees from Feyenoord.

The club made a strong start to the 2010–11 season, collecting ten points from its first five matches, including a 3–2 home victory over Feyenoord in the Rotterdam derby. Later in the season, Excelsior recorded several notable results at home, defeating AZ and drawing against both Groningen and eventual champions Ajax. A 4–1 away victory over Vitesse on the final matchday left the club one goal short of automatic safety. Finishing 16th, Excelsior retained its top-flight status via the relegation play-offs.

The following season proved more difficult, and Excelsior finished bottom of the table in the 2011–12 Eredivisie with only four league wins, resulting in relegation to the Eerste Divisie. A disappointing 2012–13 campaign followed, culminating in a 15th-place finish under Leon Vlemmings.

Ahead of the 2013–14 season, Jon Dahl Tomasson was appointed head coach, but he departed in December 2013 to join Roda JC. He was replaced by Marinus Dijkhuizen, under whom Excelsior enjoyed a strong second half of the season, highlighted by an 8–0 away victory over Telstar. The club finished third and secured promotion to the Eredivisie through the play-offs, marking its eighth promotion to the top flight.

In January 2014, chairman Albert de Jong revealed that Excelsior had narrowly avoided bankruptcy, citing a financial deficit of approximately €3 million, largely attributed to poor sporting results during the 2012–13 season.

Excelsior remained in the Eredivisie for five consecutive seasons from 2014 to 2019. The club secured survival in both the 2014–15 and 2015–16 seasons with 15th-place finishes, the latter under Alfons Groenendijk. Following Groenendijk's departure, Mitchell van der Gaag was appointed head coach. After several seasons spent battling relegation, Excelsior were relegated at the end of the 2018–19 season.

=== Recent promotions and renewed top-flight presence (2020–present) ===
Marinus Dijkhuizen returned as head coach in 2020. In May 2022, Excelsior achieved promotion to the Eredivisie after a dramatic play-off final against ADO Den Haag. After drawing 1–1 at home and falling behind in the return leg, Excelsior scored three goals in the final 13 minutes to force extra time. Despite conceding again, the team equalised through captain Redouan El Yaakoubi before winning the penalty shoot-out, with goalkeeper Stijn van Gassel saving the decisive penalty.

Excelsior spent two seasons in the Eredivisie before being relegated at the end of the 2023–24 season. The club returned immediately, securing promotion on 2 May 2025 following a 5–0 victory over Jong PSV, marking another swift return to the top tier of Dutch football.

== Stadium ==
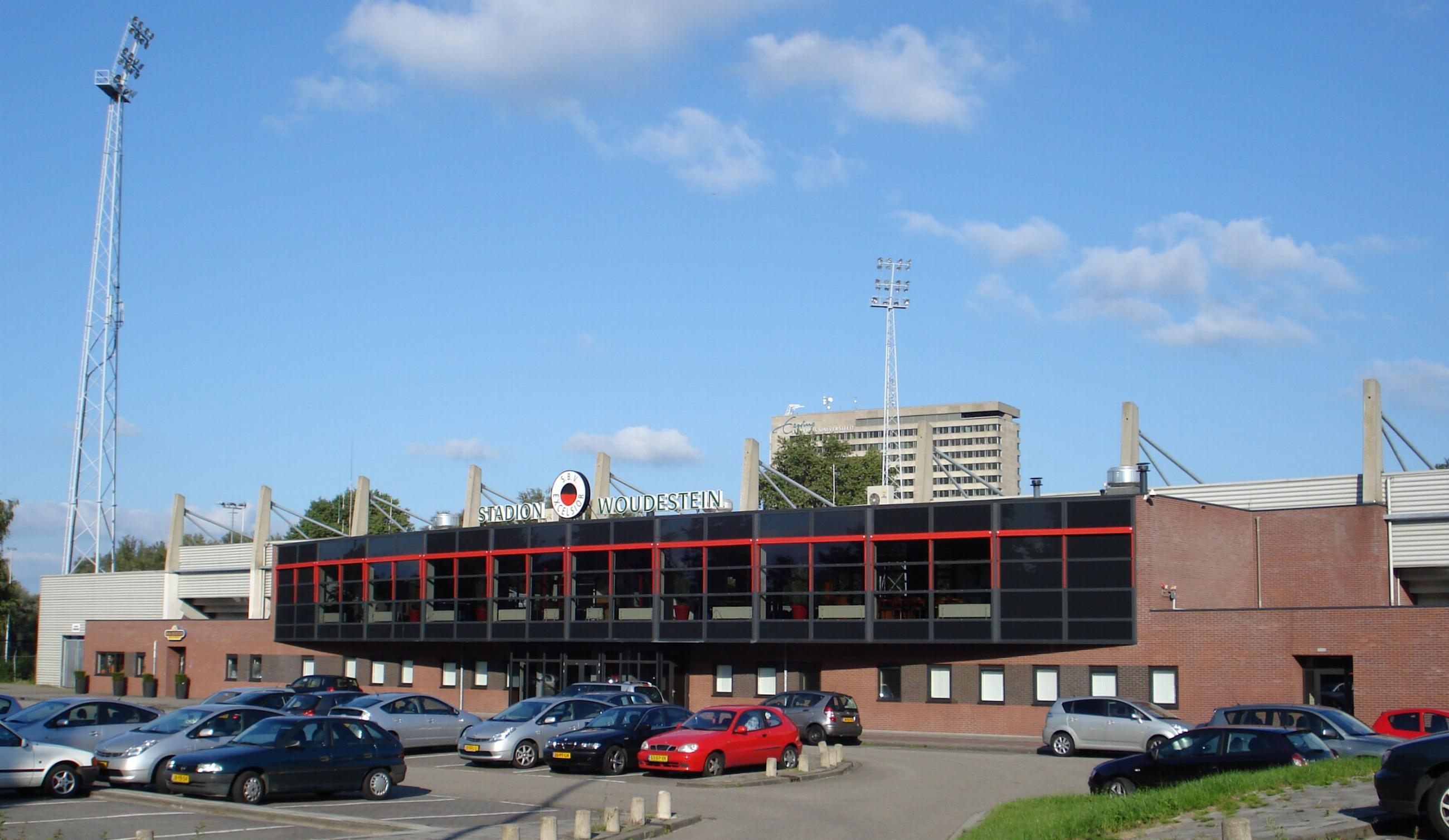
Excelsior's home venue Stadion Woudestein

Excelsior's home venue is Stadion Woudestein, which has a capacity of 4,500 seats, one of the smallest stadiums hosting professional football in the Netherlands. The official name of the stadium is Van Donge & De Roo Stadion.

The club had two short spells at different locations. For the season 1907–1908 Excelsior played on the Afrikaanderplein. After returning to Woudestein, Excelsior moved to the Toepad terrain for seasons 1922–1939. When the Dutch government decided to build marine barracks on the Toepad area right before the start of the Second World War, Excelsior moved back to the familiar Woudestein.

In the early nineties Excelsior went through a difficult period. The club barely survived a financial crisis, but a newly appointed board under the chairmanship of Martin de Jager had one important goal; a new Excelsior stadium. Various plans were made, one of them being a joint stadium for Excelsior and Sparta, but eventually none of the plans were implemented. Due to financial pressure, Excelsior decided to take the plunge and started renovating Woudestein themselves. The club built two new stands themselves and with the help of the municipality the main stand got renovated as well, including business seats and office space. On 31 July 2000, the new stadium was opened with a friendly match against Feyenoord.

When Excelsior promoted to the Eredivisie after the season 2009–10, the club decided to replace the grass surface with artificial turf. Main reason for the change was the lack of financial resources to install under-soil heating, which is mandatory for clubs participating on the highest level of Dutch football.

== Supporters and rivalries ==
=== Paper recycling club ===
Excelsior is known as the Oud papier-club (paper recycling club), because former chairman Henk Zon often used to collect old paper in order to secure the financial position of the club.

=== Mascot ===
Since 2008 'Woutje Stein' is the official Excelsior mascot. He is named after the Woudestein-stadium.

=== Rivalries ===
Rotterdam is the city with the most professional teams in the Netherlands. Besides Excelsior there are Feyenoord and Sparta Rotterdam.

==== Rivalry against Sparta ====
Excelsior is from the Kralingen-neighbourhood and Sparta Rotterdam is from the Spangen-neighbourhood. Both clubs are not always playing in the Eredivisie, hence they play matches against each other in both the Eredivisie and the Eerste Divisie. The Feyenoord partnership Excelsior had in the past has resulted in more hatred from Sparta Rotterdam supporters.

One of the more spectacular matches between Excelsior and Sparta was the 2010 derby. Excelsior managed to gain promotion to the Eredivisie by winning against Sparta in the 94th minute of the match.

==== Rivalry against Feyenoord ====
Ever since the clubs used to work together Excelsior players and supporters have grown a more serious rivalry against Feyenoord. The majority of Excelsior supporters never wanted a cooperation with Feyenoord in the first place. On 22 May 2009, Excelsior supporters hosted a funeral as they felt like their club's identity had died due to the partnership with Feyenoord.

In 2017 Excelsior won against Feyenoord (3–0), resulting in the latter not winning the Eredivisie title on that day. This resulted in riots.

== Honours ==
=== League ===
- Eerste Divisie
  - Winners (3): 1973–74, 1978–79, 2005–06
  - Promotion (7): 1969–70, 1981–82, 2001–02, 2009–10, 2013–14, 2021–22, 2024–25
- Tweede Divisie
  - Promotion (1): 1968–69

== Domestic results ==
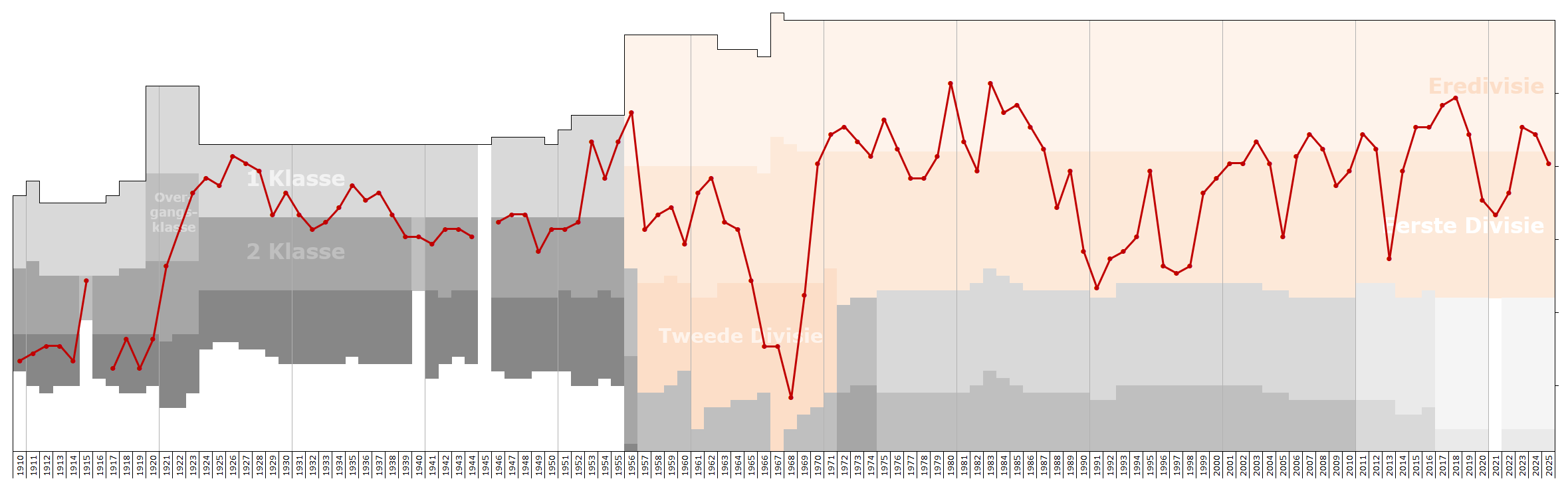
Historical chart of league performance

Below is a table with Excelsior's domestic results since the introduction of the Eredivisie in 1956.

Domestic Results since 1956
Domestic league	League result	Qualification to	KNVB Cup season	Cup result
2024–25 Eerste Divisie	2nd	Eredivisie (promotion)	2024–25	Round of 16
2023–24 Eredivisie	16th	Eerste Divisie (relegation)	2023–24	Round of 16
2022–23 Eredivisie	15th	–	2022–23	second round
2021–22 Eerste Divisie	6th	Eredivisie (winning promotion/releg. play-offs)	2021–22	second round
2020–21 Eerste Divisie	9th	–	2020–21	Quarter-final
2019–20 Eerste Divisie	7th	–	2019–20	second round
2018–19 Eredivisie	16th	Eerste Divisie (relegation)	2018–19	first round
2017–18 Eredivisie	11th	–	2017–18	first round
2016–17 Eredivisie	12th	–	2016–17	second round
2015–16 Eredivisie	15th	–	2015–16	third round
2014–15 Eredivisie	15th	–	2014–15	Semi-final
2013–14 Eerste Divisie	3rd	Eredivisie (winning promotion/releg. play-offs)	2013–14	round of 16
2012–13 Eerste Divisie	15th	–	2012–13	second round
2011–12 Eredivisie	18th	Eerste Divisie (relegation)	2011–12	third round
2010–11 Eredivisie	16th	– (surviving promotion/relegation play-offs)	2010–11	Fourth round
2009–10 Eerste Divisie	3rd	Eredivisie (winning promotion/releg. play-offs)	2009–10	Third round
2008–09 Eerste Divisie	5th	promotion/relegation play-offs: no promotion	2008–09	Round of 16
2007–08 Eredivisie	18th	Eerste Divisie (relegation)	2007–08	Round of 16
2006–07 Eredivisie	16th	– (surviving promotion/relegation play-offs)	2006–07	Third round
2005–06 Eerste Divisie	1st	Eredivisie (promotion)	2005–06	Second round
2004–05 Eerste Divisie	12th	–	2004–05	Second round
2003–04 Eerste Divisie	2nd	promotion/relegation play-offs: no promotion	2003–04	Third round
2002–03 Eredivisie	17th	Eerste Divisie (losing promo./releg. play-offs)	2002–03	Quarter-final
2001–02 Eerste Divisie	2nd	Eredivisie (winning promotion/releg. play-offs)	2001–02	Round of 16
2000–01 Eerste Divisie	2nd	promotion/relegation play-offs: no promotion	2000–01	Round of 16
1999–00 Eerste Divisie	4th	promotion/relegation play-offs: no promotion	1999–00	Round of 16
1998–99 Eerste Divisie	6th	promotion/relegation play-offs: no promotion	1998–99	Second round
1997–98 Eerste Divisie	16th	–	1997–98	Group stage
1996–97 Eerste Divisie	17th	–	1996–97	Group stage
1995–96 Eerste Divisie	16th	–	1995–96	Group stage
1994–95 Eerste Divisie	3rd	promotion/relegation play-offs: no promotion	1994–95	Second round
1993–94 Eerste Divisie	12th	–	1993–94	Third round
1992–93 Eerste Divisie	14th	–	1992–93	Round of 16
1991–92 Eerste Divisie	15th	promotion/relegation play-offs: no promotion	1991–92	Third round
1990–91 Eerste Divisie	19th	–	1990–91	Second round
1989–90 Eerste Divisie	14th	–	1989–90	Second round
1988–89 Eerste Divisie	3rd	promotion/relegation play-offs: no promotion	1988–89	First round
1987–88 Eerste Divisie	8th	–	1987–88	Round of 16
1986–87 Eredivisie	18th	Eerste Divisie (relegation)	1986–87	Quarter-final
1985–86 Eredivisie	15th	–	1985–86	First round
1984–85 Eredivisie	12th	–	1984–85	Round of 16
1983–84 Eredivisie	13th	–	1983–84	First round
1982–83 Eredivisie	9th	–	1982–83	Second round
1981–82 Eerste Divisie	3rd	Eredivisie (winning promotion/releg. play-offs)	1981–82	Round of 16
1980–81 Eredivisie	17th	Eerste Divisie (relegation)	1980–81	Second round
1979–80 Eredivisie	9th	–	1979–80	Second round
1978–79 Eerste Divisie	1st	Eredivisie (promotion)	1978–79	Second round
1977–78 Eerste Divisie	4th	promotion/relegation play-offs: no promotion	1977–78	Semi-final
1976–77 Eerste Divisie	4th	promotion/relegation play-offs: no promotion	1976–77	Round of 16
1975–76 Eredivisie	18th	Eerste Divisie (relegation)	1975–76	Second round
1974–75 Eredivisie	14th	–	1974–75	Second round
1973–74 Eerste Divisie	1st	Eredivisie (promotion)	1973–74	Round of 16
1972–73 Eredivisie	17th	Eerste Divisie (relegation)	1972–73	Round of 16
1971–72 Eredivisie	15th	–	1971–72	Quarter-final
1970–71 Eredivisie	16th	–	1970–71	Second round
1969–70 Eerste Divisie	2nd	Eredivisie (promotion)	1969–70	Second round
1968–69 Tweede Divisie	2nd	Eerste Divisie (promotion)	1968–69	Second round
1967–68 Tweede Divisie	16th	–	1967–68	Quarter-final
1966–67 Tweede Divisie	9th	–	1966–67	DNC
1965–66 Tweede Divisie	9th (group B)	–	1965–66	Group stage
1964–65 Eerste Divisie	16th	Tweede Divisie (relegation)	1964–65	Second round
1963–64 Eerste Divisie	9th	–	1963–64	Round of 16
1962–63 Eerste Divisie	8th	–	1962–63	Third round
1961–62 Eerste Divisie	2nd	–	1961–62	?
1960–61 Eerste Divisie	4th (group B)	–	1960–61	?
1959–60 Eerste Divisie	11th (group A)	–	not held	not held
1958–59 Eerste Divisie	6th (group B)	–	1958–59	?
1957–58 Eerste Divisie	7th (group A)	–	1957–58	?
1956–57 Eerste Divisie	9th (group B)	–	1956–57	?

== Players ==
=== Current squad ===
As of 10 September 2026

Note: Flags indicate national team as defined under FIFA eligibility rules; some limited exceptions apply. Players may hold more than one non-FIFA nationality.

No.	Pos.	Nation	Player
1	GK	NED	Stijn van Gassel
2	DF	GER	Eric da Silva Moreira (on loan from Nottingham Forest)
3	DF	NED	Rick Meissen
4	DF	SWE	Casper Widell
6	MF	NED	Daniël van Vianen
7	FW	NED	Aymen Sliti (on loan from Feyenoord)
8	MF	GEO	Irakli Yegoian
9	FW	ESP	Mario Domínguez (on loan from Valencia)
10	MF	NED	Noah Naujoks
11	MF	IRI	Alireza Jahanbakhsh
12	DF	AUS	Kasey Bos (on loan from Mainz 05)
14	DF	NED	Jan Plug (on loan from Feyenoord)
15	DF	NED	Simon Janssen

No.	Pos.	Nation	Player
16	GK	GBS	Celton Biai
18	MF	AUT	Valentin Sulzbacher
19	FW	SUR	David Garden
20	MF	NED	Lennard Hartjes
21	FW	CPV	Ilano Silva Timas
22	DF	GER	Osman Turay
23	FW	SWE	Yacqub Finey
24	DF	NED	Guilliano Cairo
25	DF	JAM	Marlon van de Wetering
28	FW	NED	Nesto Groen
30	FW	ISL	Ágúst Orri Þorsteinsson
40	GK	NED	Tijmen Holla

=== Out on loan ===
Note: Flags indicate national team as defined under FIFA eligibility rules; some limited exceptions apply. Players may hold more than one non-FIFA nationality.

No.	Pos.	Nation	Player
—	DF	NED	Stan Henderikx (at Dordrecht until 30 June 2027)
—	MF	USA	Zach Booth (at Real Salt Lake until 31 December 2026)

No.	Pos.	Nation	Player
—	MF	NED	Noa el Hamdaoui (at MVV until 30 June 2027)
—	FW	CUW	Jerolldino Bergraaf (at Jong AZ until 30 June 2027)

=== Player of the year ===
The Excelsior 'Player of the Year' award is voted for by the club's supporters, in recognition of the best overall performance by an individual player throughout the football season. The annual election is organized by the supporters club Pro Excelsior since 1996.

Season	Winner
1995–96	(Netherlands) Marinus Dijkhuizen
1996–97	(Netherlands) John Schuurhuizen
1997–98	(Netherlands) Ferry de Haan
1998–99	(Netherlands) Michael van der Kruis
1999–2000	(Republic of Ireland) David Connolly
2000–01	(Czech Republic) Jarda Simr
2001–02	(Netherlands) Michel Breuer
2002–03	(Netherlands) Steve Olfers
2003–04	(Netherlands) Danny Buijs
2004–05	(Australia) Brett Holman
2005–06	(Netherlands) Luigi Bruins
2006–07	(Netherlands) René van Dieren
2007–08	(Netherlands) Kees Luijckx
2008–09	(Netherlands) Jeffrey Altheer
2009–10	(Suriname) Ryan Koolwijk

Season	Winner
2010–11	(Netherlands) Daan Bovenberg
2011–12	(Suriname) Roland Alberg
2012–13	(Netherlands) Jordy Deckers
2013–14	(Netherlands) Lars Veldwijk
2014–15	(Netherlands) Sander Fischer
2015–16	(Netherlands) Rick Kruys
2016–17	(Suriname) Nigel Hasselbaink
2017–18	(Netherlands) Hicham Faik
2018–19	(Netherlands) Jerdy Schouten
2019–20	(Netherlands) Rai Vloet
2020–21	(Netherlands) Mats Wieffer
2021–22	(Netherlands) Thijs Dallinga
2022–23	(Netherlands) Stijn van Gassel
2023–24	(France) Arthur Zagre
2024–25	(Netherlands) Lance Duijvestijn

== Managers ==
=== Current staff ===
Position	Name
Head coach	(Netherlands) Ruben den Uil
Assistant head coach	(Netherlands) André Hoekstra
Assistant coach / technology strategist	(Japan) Takahisa Shiraishi
Team manager	(Netherlands) Dennis van der Neut
Goalkeeping coach	(Netherlands) Ronald Graafland
Fitness coach	(Netherlands) Mario Meijer
Physio	(Netherlands) Maurice de Groot
Physio	(Netherlands) Rinus Kerskes
Club doctor	(Netherlands) Robert Jan de Vos
Kit manager	(Netherlands) Rien van Wijk
Kit manager	(Netherlands) John van Tilburg
Chief scout	(Netherlands) Dave Coelers
Scout	(Netherlands) Bert Ebbens

=== Former managers ===
Season(s)	Manager
1954–56	(Netherlands) Rinus Smits
1956–62	(Netherlands) Bob Janse
1962–68	(Netherlands) Rinus Smits
1968–70	(Netherlands) Bob Janse
1970	(Netherlands) Jaap Kouters
1970–71	(Netherlands) Bob Janse
1971–73	(Netherlands) Joop Castenmiller
1973–75	(Netherlands) Ben Peeters
1975–76	(Netherlands) Thijs Libregts (Netherlands) Bob Janse
1976–80	(Netherlands) Thijs Libregts
1980–82	(Netherlands) Hans Dorjee
1982–86	(Netherlands) Rob Jacobs
1986–88	(Netherlands) Henk Wullems
1988–90	(Netherlands) Joop van Daele
1990	(Netherlands) Martin van der Kooy
1990–92	(Hungary) Sándor Popovics
1992–94	(Netherlands) Cor Pot
1994–95	(Netherlands) Rob Baan

Season(s)	Manager
1995–96	(Netherlands) Hans van der Pluijm
1996-03	(Netherlands) Adrie Koster
2003–04	(Netherlands) Henk van Stee
2004–05	(Netherlands) John Metgod
2005–06	(Netherlands) Mario Been
2006–09	(Netherlands) Ton Lokhoff
2009–11	(Netherlands) Alex Pastoor
2011–12	(Netherlands) John Lammers
2012–13	(Netherlands) Leon Vlemmings
2013–14	(Denmark) Jon Dahl Tomasson
2014–15	(Netherlands) Marinus Dijkhuizen
2015–16	(Netherlands) Alfons Groenendijk
2016–18	(Netherlands) Mitchell van der Gaag
2018–19	(Netherlands) Adrie Poldervaart
2019–20	(Netherlands) Ricardo Moniz
2020–24	(Netherlands) Marinus Dijkhuizen
2024–	(Netherlands) Ruben den Uil

== Notable players ==
=== National team players ===
The following players were called up to represent their national teams in international football and received caps during their tenure with Excelsior Rotterdam:

- Angola
  - (Angola) Fredy (2016–2017)
  Aruba
  - (Aruba) Mishawn Molina (2023–2024)
  - (Aruba) Kymani Nedd (2024–2025)
  - (Aruba) Ronny Nouwen (2001–2006)
  Cape Verde
  - (Cape Verde) Jeffry Fortes (2016–2020)
  - (Cape Verde) Toni Varela (2014–2015)
  Curaçao
  - (Curaçao) Nathan Markelo (2022–2023)
  - (Curaçao) Rayvien Rosario (2024–2025)
  DR Congo
  - (Democratic Republic of the Congo) Jordan Botaka (2013–2015)
  Georgia
  - (Georgia (country)) **Irakli Yegoian (2025–present)**
- Ghana
  - (Ghana) Christian Gyan (1998; 2006–2007)
  Guinea
  - (Guinea) Ahmad Mendes Moreira (2019–2021)
  Iceland
  - (Iceland) Mikael Anderson (2018–2019)
  - (Iceland) Ögmundur Kristinsson (2017–2018)
  - (Iceland) Árni Sveinsson (1978–1979)
  Japan
  - (Japan) Takafumi Ogura (1993–1994)
  Netherlands
  - (Netherlands) Maarten Grobbe (1922–1932)
  - (Netherlands) Heimen Lagerwaard (1950–1963)
  - (Netherlands) Andwelé Slory (2005–2007)
  - (Netherlands) Arie Vermeer (1940–1956)
- Republic of Ireland
  - (Republic of Ireland) David Connolly (1999–2001)
  - (Republic of Ireland) Troy Parrott (2023–2024)
  Sint Maarten
  - (Sint Maarten) Len Bleeker (2023–2024)
  - (Sint Maarten) Ronan Olivacce (2023–2025)
  Trinidad & Tobago
  - (Trinidad and Tobago) Levi García (2018)

- Players in bold actively play for Excelsior Rotterdam and for their respective national teams. Years in brackets indicate careerspan with Excelsior.

=== National team players by confederation ===
Member associations are listed in order of most to least amount of current and former Excelsior players represented internationally.

Total national team players by confederation
Confederation	Total	(Nation) Association
AFC	1	Japan (1)
CAF	6	Cape Verde (2), Angola (1), (Democratic Republic of the Congo) DR Congo (1), Ghana (1), Guinea (1)
CONCACAF	8	Aruba (3), Curaçao (2), Sint Maarten (2), (Trinidad and Tobago) Trinidad & Tobago (1)
CONMEBOL	0	
OFC	0	
UEFA	10	Netherlands (4), Iceland (3), (Republic of Ireland) Ireland (2), (Georgia (country)) Georgia (1)

=== Players in international tournaments ===
The following is a list of Excelsior Rotterdam players who have competed in international tournaments, including the Africa Cup of Nations. To this date no Excelsior players have participated in the FIFA World Cup, UEFA European Championship, CONCACAF Gold Cup, AFC Asian Cup, Copa América or the OFC Men's Nations Cup while playing for Excelsior Rotterdam.

Tournament	Players
(Equatorial Guinea) 2015 Africa Cup of Nations	(Cape Verde) Toni Varela
