= Paul Spoonley =

New Zealand sociologist (born 1951)

Paul Spoonley ONZM
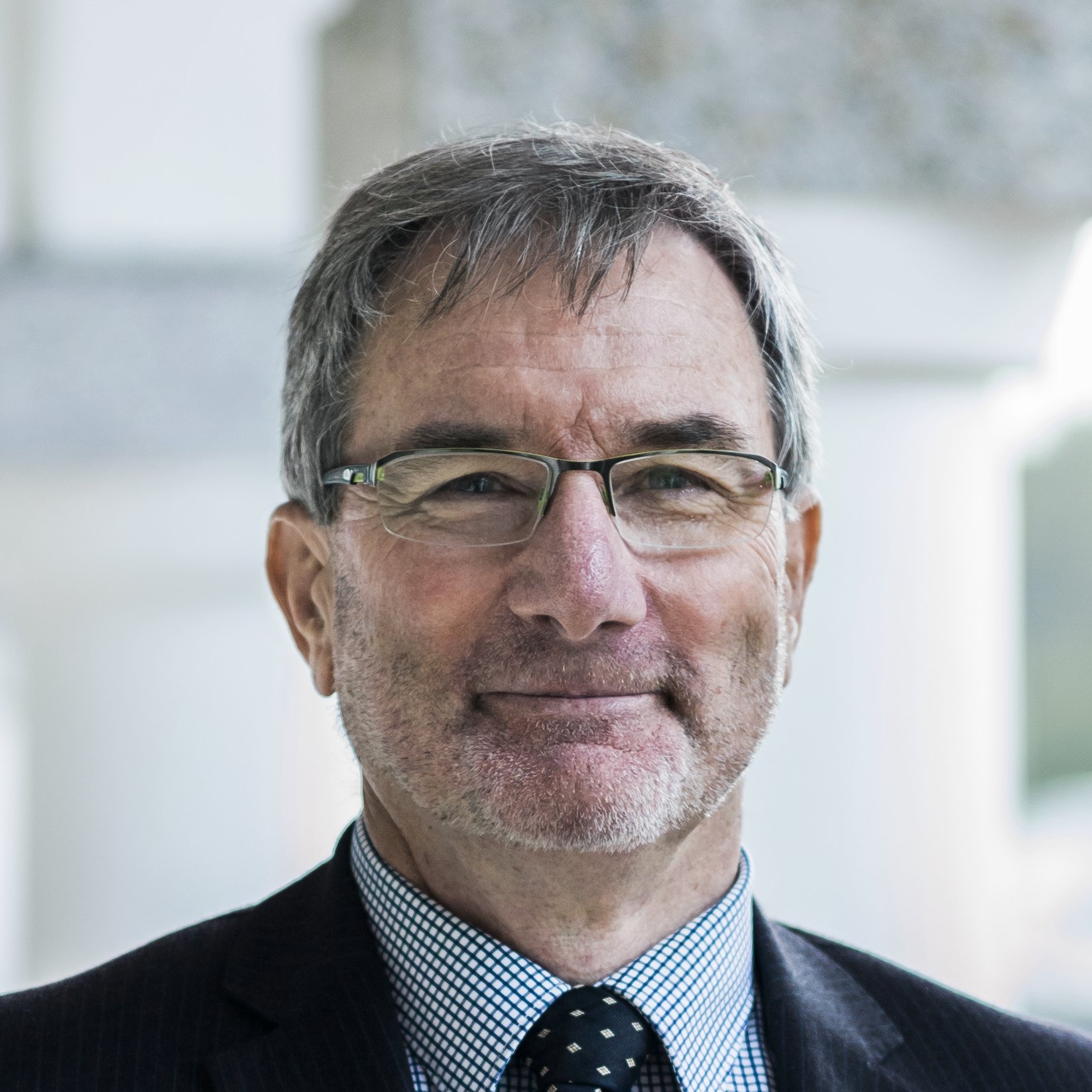
- Spoonley in 2016
- Born: 1951 (age 74–75); Upper Hutt, New Zealand
- Spouse: Jennifer Crowley
- Children: 2
- Awards: New Zealand 1990 Commemoration Medal; Fellow of the Royal Society of New Zealand (2011)

Academic background
- Education: Massey University
- Thesis: The politics of nostalgia : the petty-bourgeoisie and the extreme right in New Zealand (1986)
- Doctoral advisors: Graeme Fraser; Chris Wilkes

Academic work
- Discipline: Sociology
- Institutions: Massey University

Paul Spoonley ONZM (born 1951) is a New Zealand sociologist and emeritus professor at Massey University where his specialist area is social change and demography and how this impacts policy decisions at the political level. Spoonley has led numerous externally funded research programmes, written or edited twenty-seven books and is a regular commentator in the news media. Educated both in New Zealand and England, his work on racism, immigration and ethnicity is widely discussed in the wake of the Christchurch mosque shootings (2019) and the COVID-19 pandemic.

== Education ==
Spoonley earned a Bachelor of Arts from Victoria University of Wellington in 1973, which he followed a year later with a postgraduate diploma in geography at the University of Otago. In 1976 he obtained a Master of Arts again from Otago, studying Niuean migrants, and then a Master of Science from the University of Bristol in 1978. He completed a Bachelor of Education at the University of Auckland in 1979 and finally a doctorate from Massey University in 1986, with a thesis on the extreme right in New Zealand.

== Career ==
From 1974 to 1978, Spoonley was a teaching fellow, in the Department of Sociology at the University of Auckland and a part-time lecturer at the School of Architecture and Department of Town Planning in the University of Auckland. He began lecturing at Massey University in 1979 and was the college's research director and Auckland regional director until 2013 when he became pro vice-chancellor of the university's College of Humanities and Social Sciences. He is a fellow of the Royal Society Te Apārangi, and a member of the Max Planck Institute for the Study of Religious and Ethnic Diversity.

In 2010 Spoonley was a Fulbright senior scholar at the University of California, Berkeley, where he completed research on second-generation Latino identities. He said gaining a Fulbright award was "an opportunity to work with some of the best academics in the US to look at how identities evolve once immigrants are established in a new country".

In 2019, he stepped down from his position as pro vice-chancellor at Massey University and has reverted to a position as a research professor in the college to allow him to re-focus on writing and research. In 2021 he was made distinguished emeritus professor in recognition of "his extensive contribution to both academia and Massey University".

In early June 2022, Spoonley, along with fellow sociologist Professor Joanna Kidman, was appointed as a co-director of the Centre of Research Excellence for Preventing and Countering Violent Extremism He Whenua Taurikura. The research centre was established in line with the recommendations of the Royal Commission of Inquiry report into the Christchurch mosque shootings. Its main purpose is to sponsor research and scholarships into countering terrorism and extremism. In early June 2024, the National-led coalition government reduced the Centre's funding from NZ$1.325 million a year to NZ$500,000 in the 2024 New Zealand budget. The cuts amount to $3.3 million over the next four years. In mid October 2024, the Government ended the remaining NZ$2 million in funding to the Centre.

== Selected research projects ==
- The Institute of Labor Economics (IZA) is a nonprofit research institute that works internationally with scholars and focuses on labour economics. Spoonley joined IZA as a Research Fellow in January 2013, and in the same year, worked with Trudie Cain on a discussion paper that explored the importance of immigrant entrepreneurs being embedded in their own social networks but also in the socio-economic and politico-institutional environment of New Zealand as their new country.
- Superdiversity, social cohesion, and economic benefits (2014) is a paper by Spoonley that summarised key findings of the pros and cons of superdiversity created by increased numbers of immigrants and minority ethnic groups in a culture.
- Nga Tangata Oho Mairangi (2014–2021), funded by the Ministry of Business, Innovation and Employment (MBIE), is a project mapping the regional impacts of demographic and economic change on Auckland and other regions from 1986 to 2013, and to provide projections out to 2038. Spoonley contributed to a literature review on Immigrant Entrepreneurship and Tax Compliance (2013) to clarify the issues around compliance for immigrants in New Zealand, and in 2014, co-authored Temporary Migrants as Vulnerable Workers: A literature review. The review concluded that although more research was needed, evidence showed that in some industries temporary migrant workers were vulnerable in work situations that could be hazardous and in which they may be exploited by their employers. Other research conducted by Spoonley while working with Nga Tangata Oho Mairangi, included Population Change and Its Implications: Auckland (2016), and Population Change and Its Implications: Southland (2017). The purpose of the research was to gather and interpret data to inform discussion about how the areas were managing rapidly growing and changing populations. The data for each of these reports were collected by household interviews, employer surveys and school focus groups.
- Capturing the Diversity Dividend of Aotearoa New Zealand (2014–2021) was an MBIE-funded research programme, aimed at identifying how New Zealand could better prepare for changes resulting from demographic challenges including migration, ethnic diversity, population ageing, changing fertility patterns and urban growth. In this project Spoonley worked with Robin Peace and produced the article "Social Cohesion and Cohesive Ties: Responses to Diversity".
- Spoonley participated in the Integration of Immigrants Programme (2007–2012), a five-year research initiative funded by the Foundation for Research, Science and Technology (FRST) to gain a better understanding of the economic integration of immigrants into New Zealand. A document, to which Spoonley contributed, explained that the programme had the "key aim of contributing to progressive improvements in the utilisation of immigrant human capital, to the advantage of migrants specifically and New Zealand society more generally". During this period, Spoonley collaborated on a research project that focussed on the effect that diversification of immigration has had on relational embeddedness of immigrants in Auckland, post 1987. The paper argued that as a result of neo-liberal policies, purpose-built ethnic precincts developed to meet the needs and philosophy of free-market economic development without recognition of their cultural importance. The researchers concluded that "local neo-liberal politicians and business organisations [had] gained ideal recruits to a city economy and they were reluctant to recognise the specific ethnic nature of their activities...[and]...it remains to be seen whether and when there will be recognition of the distinctive nature of these ethnic precincts and the contribution they make to economic growth and development".
- B'nai B'rith is an international not-for-profit Jewish community services organisation that supports human rights and anti-discrimination and has a branch in New Zealand. Spoonley, on behalf of B'nai B'rith, was one of a team, including Jim Salinger that completed four surveys of the New Zealand Jewish community, the last one published in 2020.

== Advisory roles ==
=== Metropolis International Project ===
In 2018 Spoonley was chosen to join Jan Rath from the University of Amsterdam as co-chair of the Metropolis International Project. He explained that the project, which focused on empirical research and analysis as a "global network" had held 16 conferences since it began in 1996. The position of the project: 'that successful societies will be those that explicitly manage [migration and diversity] for the mutual benefit of their citizens, their migrants and their minority communities', was said by Spoonley to be "in equal parts, exciting and challenging...[because]...immigration and diversity are issues that have their fair share of tensions and anxieties. Metropolis is at the core of these debates internationally". Spoonley presented at the Metropolis Conference in Sydney in 2018, providing an overview of big data and how this could be visualised to understand super diversity in large cities such as Sydney, Auckland and Vancouver. After the presentation, there were "interactive workshops [which] introduced and taught participants to use cutting-edge data visualisation tools to explore, analyse, interpret and display big data on various dimensions of metropolitan super-diversity".

=== Understanding Police Delivery ===
Noted as "one of New Zealand's leading academics in social change and demography", Spoonley is a member of a panel of experts on a project entitled Understanding Policing Delivery to evaluate Policing in various New Zealand communities, specifically whether there is fairness in "planning, working and service delivery". On the New Zealand Police website it was further explained that the focus of the programme was on "identifying whether, where, and to what extent, bias exists at a system level in Police’s operating environment...[and]...its members bring together a diverse range of skills and experience, to ensure the research, analysis, and advice is informed by a holistic range of views and perspectives, particularly understanding and applying a tikanga Māori view". The project is a collaboration with University of Waikato and Te Puna Haumaru New Zealand Institute of Security and Crime Science, and Devon Polaschek welcomed the appointment of the panel and the "diverse range of expertise and experience they bring to this complex issue".

=== Hedayah ===
Spoonley is on the International Advisory Board (IAB) for Hedayah, the International Center of Excellence for Countering Violent Extremism which is based in Abu Dhabi, UAE, and a key operational part of the Global Counterterrorism Forum. The role of the IAB is to advise the Steering Board and Hedayah's leadership team. On 15 October 2019, Spoonley in an opinion piece, responding to The Christchurch Call, an "attempt to seek international co-operation, involving both the major online platforms and other countries and agencies, to monitor and act against extreme racist content and violence in cyberspace", noted that a meeting to discuss violent extremism jointly hosted by Hedayah and Deakin University in Melbourne, concluded the extreme right had platforms of social media at the time that were independent of others such as Facebook and could circulate their ideology without being "subject to moderation and regulation".

== Public policy positions ==
=== Immigration ===
Spoonley has noted the danger of racism in New Zealand in his discussions on extremism, but in 1996 was involved in a journal article that considered how this may have come about as a result of the politicisation of immigration. It involved an examination of statements made by Winston Peters during the campaign for the 1996 New Zealand general election which were seen as racialising immigrants and got a response from the Office of the Race Relations Conciliator with which Spoonley had an involvement that allowed him to observe some of the discussion around this issue. The authors of the journal article took the position that 'race' was not an "inherent biological fact, but instead...the product of social relations of domination and exploitation". The article backgrounded the geopolitical situation in New Zealand at the time as being partly influenced by an alignment with the economies of Asia which had resulted in increased immigration from East Asia into the country. These immigrants were often portrayed negatively in the media, with some examples of public hostility, but the article held that "the politics of exclusion gained its most obvious expression during [the] election year through the comments of Winston Peters". The Sydney Morning Herald said a study that Spoonley had carried out at the same time, [cited] "racial prejudice, unemployment and Government's failure to help newcomers settle", and Spoonley agreed that "New Zealand had not come up to their expectations". In the newspaper article, Spoonley gave examples of racism against Asian children and noted that "migrants found New Zealanders friendly on a personal level but were puzzled and threatened by racist public comments". Peters denied the accusations, but the Race Relations Conciliator said that the situation in the community around this issue was "quite precarious" and there were "danger signals" that needed to be addressed.

Spoonley later advocated for a population policy to manage immigration and find the balance between the numbers and meeting labour and skill demands, arguing that the country should set a target of net migration each year to be around one per cent of the population. Other issues identified included a dropping fertility rate and an ageing population in New Zealand, deficits in infrastructure and how temporary work visas were managed in terms of a possible transition to permanent residency. There was also the need to address how immigrants were viewed by the local population, build awareness of the value of diversity and social inclusion and deal with extremism that created anxiety through such things as hate speech and xenophobia. He noted that there hadn't been a discussion about this since the mid-1970s, and argued that COVID-19 had highlighted how complex the situation was and the importance of having a "comprehensive and informed discussion about population change and options".

Spoonley in August 2020 predicted that by 2030 the population of the New Zealand would be older, and this would result in what he called "sub-replacement fertility" that was likely to drop further due to COVID-19. He said that the challenge was for the country to adapt to a different demography, and the default response that this would be solved by immigration was unlikely to provide the solution, exacerbated by the impact of lockdowns to manage the pandemic. In the same opinion piece, Spoonley said that a growing concentration of New Zealand's population growth in Auckland, would need policy interventions by the government to prevent "stagnation...[or]...decline" in other parts of the country. His conclusion was that the changes were "unprecedented", the policy framework was not "fit for purpose" and what was needed was "an agreed population policy, and a greater public awareness of how significant and disruptive these changes [were] going to be". He confirmed this position at a presentation to the Institute of Directors in New Zealand in May 2021, with a caveat that a population policy was not just about managing immigration and the other factors needed to be taken into consideration. He did add however, that immigration is often seen just as a source of labour for New Zealand rather than a factor that has "dramatically altered" the population of the country.

Spoonley has held that how well a country such as New Zealand acknowledges the significance of the transformation of the ethnic make-up of the country due to diverse immigrants, is measured by the positive identify choices immigrant families make, particularly in education, where children having a positive identity is closely related to "valued self-worth with a sense of shared identity that is further believed to promote beneficial relationships, sense of belonging and social cohesion". This paper, which presented findings from a doctoral research programme and was co-authored by Spoonley, argued that there was a need to keep re-examining the issue in New Zealand because these identify choices determined a sense of belonging and inclusion that had implications for the wellbeing of immigrant families. Taking into account that identities can be fluid and often dual or multiple, the authors concluded that "social and educational practices that are underpinned by a singular and collective identity are inadequate for the task of reflecting the diverse identities of immigrants...[and]...the findings presented in this article [suggested] that Chinese immigrant parents aspired for their children to develop a sense of belonging to the adopted country, and wished that they would include a 'Kiwi' identity in their identity repertoire". This would require open, respectful relationships between families and schools and the development of "inclusive practices and cohesiveness."

In 2019 Spoonley was involved in review of how the issue of social cohesion had been handled by New Zealand governments since the introduction of a cabinet paper providing indicators for assessing immigrant and host outcomes in 2005. The authors contended that an approach which focused on developing indicators of cohesive ties that point to the small mechanisms contributing to "unity, togetherness, continuity, coherence, connection, linkages and interrelatedness between people and groups...has the potential to shift the conversation away from the relatively ubiquitous emphasis on cohesion as a property of ethnic differentiation...towards an understanding that differences between individuals and groups are multi-faceted, inevitable and enriching". The same paper suggested three ways to re-consider social cohesion in a New Zealand context: allow more space to Māori to define the concept; avoid a narrow concern with cohesion being primarily about ethnic differences and take a wider, more inclusive approach, that built awareness of how digital spaces can engender prejudices and hate toward those of different gender, age or religious beliefs; and to understand how interconnections that are not threatening happen when there is a conscious effort by people to "build knowledge of each other in everyday engagement..to give more robust meaning to discussions about cohesion – and to the possibilities for enhancing it".

The effect of COVID-19 on social cohesion within New Zealand has also been examined by Spoonley. In 2020, he co-authored a paper that evaluated the challenges faced by the country as it emerged from the pandemic to make an effective "human- and society-centered reset". The paper took the position that: "The crisis has brought into stark relief the position of those who were already experiencing social and economic difficulties...[and]...with expanded vulnerability, many may become angry, frustrated, depressed, anxious and suffer a loss of hope which may persist for years." The authors noted that this could threaten social cohesion and if New Zealand was to be a resilient society and deal with the unaddressed issues, it was essential to enquire into what new vulnerabilities may arise, whether the vulnerable become more or less recognised and the levels of trust in the country's institutions and government.

=== Extremism ===
Right-wing populism, racism and the alt-right became an area of interest to Spoonley while studying at the University of Bristol in 1976. As a result of several incidents involving racist violence that happened close to where he was staying, Spoonley was inspired to become an "academic specialist in Right-wing hate". In 1980 he published an article that showed how the ideology of the National Front, a right-wing group in England was reflected in the keywords of the headlines of their publications. Sixty-six per cent of the items had racial cue words that were linked to "conflict disagreement words" such as "threat" and "invade". Spoonley later reflected that when he returned to New Zealand in the 1980s, after doing his research on extreme-right group in the United Kingdom, he was told that there were no similar organisations in his home country. In the same article, he recalled that there were more than 70 such extreme groups in New Zealand at that time, with several murders since 1989 being attributed to white supremacists. Throughout the 1980s Spoonley looked at these groups in New Zealand, noting "they were a mixture of skinhead, neo-nazi and extreme nationalist groups" that held extreme right-wing views with ideologies based on antisemitism and the supremacy of the "British race". By the 1990s the internet and social media were playing a role in spreading these ideas and Islamophobia was now supplementing antisemitism. In 2018 he conducted a project on hate speech examining what some New Zealanders were saying online and concluded [that] "it did not take long to discover the presence of hateful and anti-Muslim comments". Spoonley later shared with RNZ that the far right in New Zealand was now more technologically sophisticated, connected to international networks and actively trying to get involved in mainstream politics.

In 2018 Spoonley wrote an article about the history of the alt-right and some of the ideas behind it. He noted that the term applied to a loose coalition of "ultra-nationalists, white supremacists, neo-Nazis and anti-Semites" and first appeared in the United States in 2008, attributed to Richard B. Spencer a neo-Nazi who believed in eugenics and ethnic cleansing to make the United States a white ethno-state. The movement got more exposure in 2016 when Steve Bannon established Breitbart, a right-wing news network. In the light of the Christchurch mosque shootings (2018), Spoonley was critical of New Zealand's complacency about the potential threat from far-right groups, including neo-Nazi and extreme nationalists. A year on from the Christchurch mosque shootings he estimated that there could be 150 – 300 right-wing activists in New Zealand, and cautioned against "a tendency to see the Christchurch attacks, which killed 51 people, as a one-off or an aberration — rather than something we still need to guard against".

On the day following the Christchurch mosque shootings, Spoonley summarised some of his research on the extreme right-wing in New Zealand. He noted that while public surveys such as those conducted annually by The Asia New Zealand Foundation had shown a majority of New Zealanders supported diversity and see immigration from Asia as being beneficial to the country, "extremist politics, including the extreme nationalist and white supremacist politics that appear to be at the core of this attack on Muslims, [had] been part of the New Zealand community for a long time".

Spoonley retired from his position as Pro Vice-Chancellor at Massey University in 2019 to work on a book in which he expressed concerns with the "far right, and particularly ultra-nationalists and white supremacists being reinvented as the Alt-Right...[and becoming]... much more successful in influencing mainstream debate and political actors". Sharing an opinion piece in 2020, Spoonley argued that far-right extremism "[remained] a high-level threat in New Zealand." In 2020, Spoonley published an article recalling how in 2010, during his time at the University of Berkeley, he became aware of a political movement called the Tea Party that had "established a legacy of radical populism and, among its more extreme members, a new form of white identity politics". He was concerned at the degree that radical right-wing groups were using the internet to influence people and this came more into focus after the Christchurch mosque shootings in 2019.

A New Zealand news service Stuff discussed a document on 10 March 2020 that had allegedly been prepared by a neo-Nazi group Action Zealandia. It told its members to refuse any interviews and detailed the powers of the New Zealand Security Intelligence Service (SIS), the Government Communications Security Bureau (GSSB) and a special investigation group established by the New Zealand Police, which according to the manual was trained to "coerce" information from people. Spoonley commented that this was more comprehensive than anything he had previously researched and made the point it indicated that there was a "degree of sophistication, especially in relation to online far-right activities, which is new and concerning".

In 2021, the New Zealand Government convened He Whenua Taurikura: New Zealand’s Hui on Countering Terrorism and Violent Extremism in response to a recommendation of The Royal Commission of Inquiry into the Christchurch mosque shootings on 15 March 2019. Jacinda Ardern explained that this was to be the first annual hui to "look at ways to challenge hate-motivated extremist ideologies and to discuss priorities to address issues of terrorism and violent extremism". At the conference Spoonley presented as part of a panel in a session called Addressing the causes: how can embracing community and diversity-focused approaches contribute to preventing and countering violent extremism. He noted that the research he had done in the 1970s remained relevant in 2021, despite changes such as an increase in Islamophobia and the rise of the interconnectedness New Zealand had with international extremism. He stated it was still important to not assume there was a consensus all social cohesion was good, but acknowledged that "approaches should not focus entirely on immigrant/host relations, but should have foundations in Te Tiriti o Waitangi, be country-specific (consider what factors contribute to social cohesion in New Zealand, and what radicalises individuals here), and incorporate co-design – with community participation and leadership".

After being appointed as a co-director of He Whenua Taurikura (Centre for Preventing and Countering Violent Extremism) in June 2022, Spoonley said there was a "definite rise of anti-semitism and Islamophobia through the online landscape in New Zealand", and noted that the Government had commissioned the Institute for Strategic Dialogue and Te Pūnaha Matatini to research the online environment in the country.

== Commentary on COVID-19 ==
=== Effect on diversity ===
Spoonley was involved in a 2020 survey that identified the three most important diversity issues in Kiwi organisations as wellbeing, gender equity and bias, and noted that the disruptions of COVID-19 had caused further challenges that needed to be solved collectively to emerge into the "new normality". The survey paper concluded:

This report is being released as New Zealand is in lockdown as part of the country’s response to the threat posed by Covid-19. This will disrupt and change work in ways that are still not fully understood – and which might not be fully realised for some time. One assumption is that the changing nature of work will be accelerated by what has been required during the lockdown. Working remotely using new technologies is one example. What will happen to the recognition and responses to diversity that are reported here? Will issues of diversity become less or more important? The responses to the 2021 survey will measure just how disruptive Covid-19 will be on New Zealand organisations and firms. As always, it will be important to gather data on what is happening in the diversity space and to report on the trends over time.

=== Impact on immigration ===
Early in the COVID-19 pandemic in New Zealand, Spoonley said that the response of the New Zealand Government to immigration was still unclear and depended on what other countries did, noting measures taken in the US and Hungary as an excuse to curtail migration and take a punitive approach. He expressed a concern that while New Zealand was a very diverse country, immigrants could be adversely affected and it would depend on the resilience, networking, collaborative capabilities and resourcing of the ethnic communities to manage the situation. Spoonley highlighted the important role of media in sharing information in an informed and truthful way that acknowledged and reflected the diverse voices in an "altered media landscape...[and]...provide bridges within and between communities".

The New Zealand Government announced an immigration reset in May 2021 that reduced the immigrant numbers. Stuart Nash the Economic Development Minister said it was a response to the threat of COVID-19 and an opportunity get a balance for foreign labour while encouraging incentives to upskill local workers. There were mixed responses to the measure including that it was "scapegoating migrants for problems with housing, infrastructure and working conditions", that it lacked detail and would not address the worker shortage. Spoonley however, said that the high numbers of temporary and permanent workers entering New Zealand over recent years had probably not been sustainable, put pressure on infrastructure and by being over-reliant on cheap foreign labour, had diverted a focus on developing new technology to increase productivity – a situation that Spoonley said was [possibly] "preventing New Zealand preparing for an entirely different and fast-approaching future". The New Zealand Productivity Commission conducted an inquiry before the reset was announced and their findings were released in November 2021. Spoonley said that the report showed a tightening up of policy settings around temporary workers and the opportunity for them to transition to residency and "suggest[ed] that some industries might...[have needed]...to justify why they're on the skills shortage list...[in effect]...tying migration more to demand in the local labour market".

As a result of the "demographic disruption" that happened with regard to immigration in New Zealand because of restrictions put in place to manage the COVID-19 pandemic, Spoonley questioned whether the country could maintain the positive social bonds built during the pandemic into a future that would have further issues to manage in unemployment and housing. He also said it was important to acknowledge the number of New Zealanders returning to their home country during the COVID-19 pandemic.

Spoonley had concerns that political rhetoric could damage the reputation of New Zealand as a country that was welcoming and tolerant. He said he was "very disappointed with the level of the debate generally...[but it was necessary]... to have a discussion about immigration because it's now very important to this country, in terms of both its social and economic impacts". Spoonley said that immigrants have contributed considerably to New Zealand society and that in spite of some challenges, immigrant communities were now getting large enough to sustain businesses. Spoonley has said that Māori as tangata whenua of New Zealand could be more involved in policymaking in immigration and take an obvious role in welcoming immigrants to New Zealand, giving the example of how a Māori tribe Ngati Whatua ki Kaipara had engaged with Chinese immigrants, teaching them te reo Māori, waiata and haka.

=== Demographic considerations ===
In 2022, Spoonley told Kathryn Ryan on RNZ that while generally around the world, COVID-19 had seen a drop in life expectancy, in New Zealand there had been an increase of around eight months. He suggested this was likely to be due to "a combination of the relatively low number of Covid-19 deaths at the start of the pandemic and the restrictions brought in which reduced other deaths". He said birth rates initially slowed during COVID-19 due to people being unsure about their jobs or anxious about bringing children into a world dealing with a pandemic, noting that in 2020 New Zealand had its lowest birth rate since the 1980s. While this increased in 2021, Spoonley explained it was still below a plateau of 60,000 reached in 2016. He said that during the 1990s and early 2020s this population growth rate was the highest of any OECD country, maintaining that although it had reduced early in COVID-19, it remained important for policymakers to remember that two-thirds of population growth came from migration and measures to manage this needed to look at the capacity of New Zealand to absorb migrants without putting infrastructure under pressure. He questioned whether the immigration policies of New Zealand were "fit for purpose", suggesting they needed to consider an international labour shortage and the impact that the measures taken to address the pandemic had on immigrant communities, particularly in how families became divided. Spoonley suggested that post-COVID New Zealand accepted a net population loss and develop initiatives to attract and hold migrants. He acknowledged New Zealand struggled to be competitive internationally with wages, but concluded that "migrants tend to come to NZ because of life style, education and safety of the country", and the challenge was to have the capacity to process applications.

=== Implications of protests ===
As the 2022 Wellington protest entered its third week, Toby Manhire noted that a paper co-authored by Spoonley in December 2021, had identified New Zealand was trending toward more public displays of "anger, fear, and hatred of others...[possibly]...accelerated by some responses to actions taken to address the Covid-19 pandemic....from members of society who, for historical and other reasons, [had] low trust in government or in other elites such as medical scientists". Spoonley responded that while there were high levels of compliance during the pandemic which showed some social cohesion, discussing this with a bottom-up approach was necessary and working with local communities, particularly Māori and Pasifika was crucial in achieving genuinely cohesive outcomes. In the same article, Spoonley said online toxicity remained a concern and the protests at parliament served as warning of a "vitriolic element" that could enable extremists to undermine social cohesion by violence.

After the police made a move to block entry and exit points into the occupation, Spoonley said it was necessary to both preserve the right to protest and ensure public safety. He suggested that force by police may be necessary because some of the protesters blatantly did not accept legal authorities and online threats and the deliberate spreading of mis- and disinformation was highlighting the "malign influence of conspiratorial and socially destructive views for our liberal democracy". By 3 March 2022, Spoonley was commenting on the visibility of extremism at the protest, acknowledging that, while historically there had previously been anti-authority and "conspiratorial views" in New Zealand, COVID-19 had given impetus to a wider range of groups that held these ideas and the police appeared to have been caught off guard about the effect they were having on the protest. He suggested that many New Zealanders may have been "surprised and saddened about the extremist politics visible at the Parliament protest...[and]...the challenge now is to ensure further hate crimes or violence do not follow." When concerned were expressed in the media about the threats and violence at the protest and how this was manifesting as 'hate messages' that were offensive to Muslims, Spoonley said this partly reflected an increase in the online presence of the alt-right and other conspiratorial groups, resulting in wide-ranging online hate that was proving difficult for the authorities to manage.

Spoonley had earlier said that changes in New Zealand's way of life after COVID would "not be determined by protesters", but by the way the majority of people adjust to use of leisure time, travelling and dining out, with less dependence on tourism. He noted the anti-government movement that had become very visible in New Zealand was "going to be a faultline in terms of our politics for some time" and coupled with airports being major sources of infection, meant there would be "biosecurity or medical biosecurity risks inherent in international travel".

== Selected publications ==
- Sustaining Aotearoa New Zealand as a Cohesive Society (2021). As an affiliate of Koi Tū :The Centre for Informed Futures based at the University of Auckland directed by Sir Peter Gluckman, Spoonley co-authored this publication which critically examined the presumption that in New Zealand as a liberal democracy, decisions were made by accountable leaders whose choices are based on facts and evidence. Social cohesion in a democratic society is defined as high levels of trust and respect between people and institutions in all areas of life, in particular when involving execution of power and recognition of diversity and inclusion. The paper acknowledged the challenges to social cohesion in the 21st century and concluded that New Zealand, like other countries, needed to continuously improve, adapt, and self-correct through cooperation, transparency and an openness to different views. In reference to the paper, on 1News Spoonley noted the potential for COVID-19 to "impact health and economic and social security...[potentially]...amplifying existing inequalities...[and]...frustration over the consequences of Government-imposed controls, the role of disinformation, and the increasingly siloed way people were accessing information". Spoonley, in another news item on Newshub about the paper, also made a connection between social cohesion in New Zealand and the obligations under the Treaty of Waitangi.
- The New New Zealand – The Demographic Disruption We're Not Talking About (2020). Authored by Spoonley, this book examined data on the demographic transition of New Zealand and how the speed of this had made the formulation of social policy difficult. When discussing this book in an interview on RNZ, Spoonley said that New Zealand needed to do some rapid forward planning to deal with the fast-changing demographics. In an interview with Massey University Press, Spoonley said he hoped people took away from the book the importance of "factor[ing] in demographic change into...policy and political discussions...[resulting in]...new policies to cater for the circumstances we face in the 21st century".
- Racism and Stereotypes (2019). In this chapter within The Palgrave Handbook of Ethnicity, Spoonley examined how stereotyping, which attributed specific characteristics to a whole group within a society usually in a derogatory or hostile way, could be used "to justify, discrimination and various forms of exclusion" and were often a test of public sentiment and analyses of racism. The article concluded that "stereotypes contribute to the social control of others and to denigration and/or exclusion...[and]...there are real world consequences to the use of stereotypes as part of the presence of racism".
- Exploring Society: Sociology for New Zealand Students, 4th Edition (2019). Chapter 1 of this textbook co-edited by Spoonley, defined sociology and how it could be used, introduced the key themes in the publication and highlighted the role of theorising and researching as key skills of social inquiry.
- The politics and construction of identity and childhood: Chinese immigrant families in New Zealand (2017). Co-authored by Spoonley in Global Studies of Childhood, this paper critically examined the identify choices that Chinese immigrants to New Zealand made for themselves and their families to acquire a positive identify. The paper showed how this process is related to the degree that these immigrants feel included in the country and argued that "social and educational practices that are underpinned by a singular and collective identity are inadequate for the task of reflecting the diverse identities of immigrants...[and]...intentional intervention, such as active and open dialogue between parents and teachers, is required to understand the heterogeneous expectations of each other, and developing respectful relationships, inclusive practices and cohessiveness".
- Renegotiating citizenship: Indigeneity and superdiversity in contemporary Aotearoa/New Zealand (2017). The focus in this paper was on unpacking the debate on identity, nationalism and citizenship that had happened since the 1970s in New Zealand, and drew together a recognition of the indigeneity of Māori as tangata whenua and the changes in ethnic diversity following a focus on new immigration policies in the 1980s.
- Rebooting the Regions: Why low or zero growth needn't mean the end of prosperity (2016). Spoonley edited this book and in a discussion on Radio New Zealand said that addressing the issue of young adults leaving the regions because of the growing labour markets in the cities, might need a "managed decline" that created people-policies focussed on developing strategies and creative options to attract them back. He said it was possible to manage the demographic changes in the regions creatively.
- New Zealanders' attitudes to Asia and Asian peoples: An exceptional case? (2015). This article, co-authored by Spoonley, discussed the changing demographic of New Zealand in terms of increasing numbers of immigrants from Asia, and the shape of public opinion in the country in response to this. The paper concluded that New Zealand's attitudes towards immigrants from Asia had less levels of anxiety than other Western societies and there was a positive view of tourism and access to Asian markets.
- New diversity, old anxieties in New Zealand: the complex identity politics and engagement of a settler society (2014). In this article authored by Spoonley, superdiversity in New Zealand is explored as a model of colonization of Māori as the indigenous people of the land happening alongside projects centering on mass immigration, including a specific recruitment project at the time that appeared to value immigrants for the skills they brought to economic development. The article identified the concessions made to recognise diversity and group rights in this process since the 1970s and explored the politics of this societal superdiversity in the country.
- Welcome to Our World? Immigration and the Reshaping of New Zealand (2012). Spoonley co-authored this book while he was a Fulbright scholar. In the New Zealand Geographer, a reviewer from the University of Auckland said that the book was a "comprehensive overview of New Zealand's immigration history and policy development and how they have shaped the current society of New Zealand".
- Ethnic and religious intolerance (2011, reviewed and revised 2018). Written by Spoonley and printed fully in Te Ara: The Encyclopedia of New Zealand, this publication noted in the introduction: "The expression of intolerance of other ethnic groups and religions can range from extreme violence (including genocide) to organised discrimination, to low-key or commonplace expressions of prejudice. In general New Zealanders' intolerance has been towards the lower end of this spectrum."
- Mata Toa The Life and Times of Ranginui Walker (2009). This is a biography of an academic, author, commentator and radical leader who influenced the views held by Pākehā New Zealanders of Māori people. As an activist Walker, organised the Young Maori Leaders conference in 1970 which led to the formation of Nga Tamatoa. Writing in The Journal of the Polynesian Society, Rawiri Taonui from the Auckland University of Technology, questioned why a Pākehā should write this biography. He concluded that Walker and Spoonley "shared an academic kinship.... Walker's has been the most influential Māori pen on Māori-Pākehā relations and Spoonley, who has written and edited 26 books, the most influential Pākehā writer on general New Zealand race relations". After publication of the book, Spoonley noted that "for many, Ranginui Walker personified the radical face of Māori activism, while for others he was an authoritative source of information on a colonial history, Māori ambitions and current events.
- Reporting Superdiversity. The Mass Media and Immigration in New Zealand (2009). This article examined the role of the media in reporting on the diversity in New Zealand that had happened as a result of immigration, and argued "that there [was] evidence of a recent and partial transformation in the nature of media discourses concerning immigrants and immigration in New Zealand".
- Social Policy Critical Issues in New Zealand Society (1992). This book co-edited by Spoonley, examined the welfare state in New Zealand in terms of it effectiveness in providing help.
- The Politics of Nostalgia: Racism and the extreme right in New Zealand (1987). This book has been situated by one critic within the discussion of the future of liberal democracy and how it managed the challenges posed by allowing a wide range of groups to operate. The same writer said that Spoonley dealt with one of these groups, and unpacked the "political machinations of the extreme Right...[being]...particularly concerned with the ideology and activities of traditional petit-bourgeois and contemporary neo-fascist groups". The book was adapted from Spoonley's thesis and brought a sociological analysis of the beginning and rise of what one reviewer called, "the reactionary racist right" in New Zealand from the 1880s...[concluding]..."that in terms of the historical worth, The Politics of Nostalgia stands entirely alone in New Zealand literature at large".
- Revival of the Right: New Zealand politics in the 1980s (1988). Reviewed in The Sydney Morning Herald, the book was described as a prediction by the authors of the "emergence of an acceptable form of racism, fuelled by resentment against Māori land claims and the introduction of Taha Māori (Things Māori) into the education system...[and]...in the forefront of the reaction will be the economic Right, a group devoted to freedom of the individual and the market". In the article, Spoonley expressed the view that the economic Right could play an active role in the debate about race relations in New Zealand because of a belief that "things such as ethnic privilege are said to distort the market...[and]...will appeal to nationalist sentiments, fundamentally around the issues of the national economic well-being of New Zealand".

== Honours and awards ==
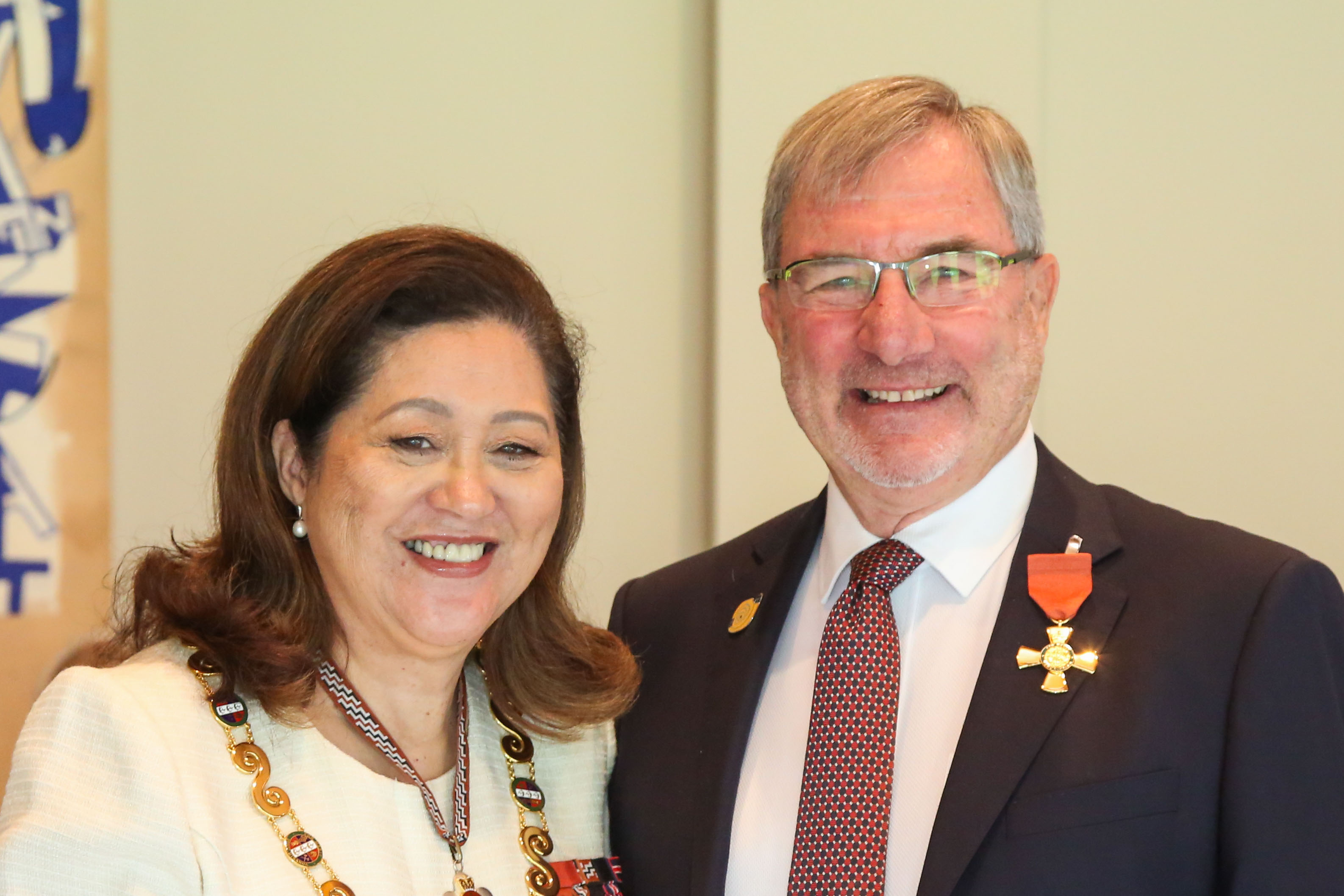
Spoonley (right), after his investiture as an Officer of the New Zealand Order of Merit by the governor-general, Dame Cindy Kiro, at Government House, Auckland, on 11 April 2026

Spoonley was a recipient of the New Zealand 1990 Commemoration Medal in 1990.

A fellow of the Royal Society Te Apārangi, in 2009 Spoonley was awarded the Royal Society Te Apārangi Science and Technology medal in recognition of his academic scholarship, leadership and public contribution to cultural understanding.

In 2011, his contribution to sociology was acknowledged with the Sociological Association of Aotearoa New Zealand's scholarship for exceptional service to New Zealand sociology.

In the 2025 King’s Birthday Honours, Spoonley was appointed an Officer of the New Zealand Order of Merit, for services to sociology.

In 2026, Spoonley was awarded the Royal Society Te Apārangi's Durie Medal.
