= Vreewijk =

Coordinates: 51°53′09″N 4°30′46″E

- Neighborhood of Rotterdam
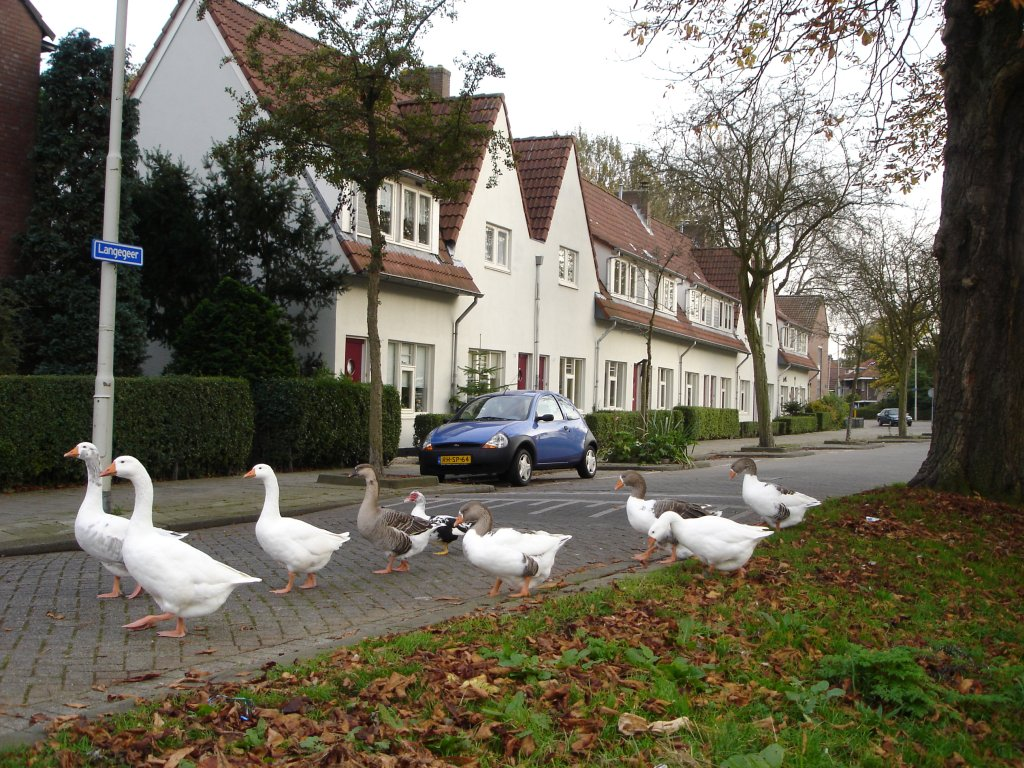
- Interactive map of Vreewijk
- Country: Netherlands
- Province: South Holland
- COROP: Rotterdam
- Borough: Feijenoord
- Time zone: UTC+1 (CET)

Vreewijk is a neighborhood of Rotterdam, Netherlands.
