= Hillesluis =

Coordinates: 51°53′38″N 4°30′52″E

- Neighborhood of Rotterdam
- Interactive map of Hillesluis
- Country: Netherlands
- Province: South Holland
- COROP: Rotterdam
- Borough: Feijenoord

Population
  - Estimate (2021): 12,000
- Time zone: UTC+1 (CET)

Hillesluis is a neighborhood of Rotterdam, Netherlands, located in the Feijenoord district. It was built in the early 19th century. The neighborhood is composed of a majority of minorities, and also is considered to be predominantly resource-poor.

== History ==
Hillesluis was built in the early 19th century, following a demand for cheap labor in the Port of Rotterdam. Originally, most of the residents were dockworkers from Zeeland and North Brabant. However, following World War 2, it increased in diversity, as workers from Turkey and Morocco immigrated into the neighborhood.

== Demographics ==
In 2005, the average annual income was €14,900, and 28% were below the poverty line, 4% were considered high income, and 29% had unemployment benefits. 28% were also born and had Dutch origins, with 6% also born there but without Dutch origins, and the remaining 66% were immigrants. This was out of 6,197 residents, 70% of which were aged 20 and older. Also in 2005, the average income per person and per household, after taxes and compulsory insurance, was €8,600 and €21,900, respectively. In 2009, about 70% of households lived on low income, with 5% and 25% earning high and middle incomes, respectively. In 2021, about 25% of the ~12,000 residents are of Turkish origin, with about 21% being of Dutch origin, and about 14%, 10%, and 30% being of Dutch Surinamese, Dutch Moroccan, and many other origins, respectively.
