= Joanna Kidman =

New Zealand sociology academic

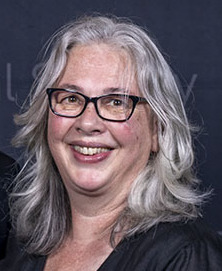
- Kidman in 2023
- Education: Australian National University
- Scientific career
- Workplaces: Victoria University of Wellington
- Thesis: Travelling in the present historic: a case study of socialisation in an academic community in New Zealand (2001)
- Website: inabrownstudy.nz

Joanna Kidman FRSNZ is a Māori sociology academic of Ngāti Maniapoto and Ngāti Raukawa descent and as of 2019 is a full professor at Victoria University of Wellington. In 2024 she was elected as a Fellow of the Royal Society Te Apārangi.

== Academic career ==
After a 2001 PhD titled Travelling in the present historic: a case study of socialisation in an academic community in New Zealand at the Australian National University, Kidman moved to Victoria University of Wellington, rising to full professor.

In early June 2022, Kidman and fellow sociologist Professor Paul Spoonley were designated as the directors of the new Centre of Research Excellence for Preventing and Countering Violent Extremism. The research centre was established in line with the recommendations of the Royal Commission of Inquiry's report into the Christchurch mosque shootings to fund research and scholarships into countering terrorism and extremism. In early June 2024, the Centre's funding was reduced from NZ$1.325 million a year to NZ$500,000 in the 2024 New Zealand budget. The cuts amount to $3.3 million over the next four years. Kidman described the budget reduction as a "huge cut" that would affect the Centre's research and operations. In mid October 2024, the New Zealand Government ended the remaining NZ$2 million in funding to the Centre. A trust spokesperson said that the funding cut would create a gap in research on "White extremism."

== Public profile ==
In early March 2024, Kidman criticised the National-led coalition government's pilot boot camp and ACT leader David Seymour's proposal to review the free school lunches programme. In a X social media post, Kidman also accused the Government of hating "poor and brown" children and described the Government as a "death cult." Kidman's remarks were criticised by Seymour, who accused her of making personal attacks and name-calling. In response, Victoria University issued a statement that "while it supports the rights of academics to have an independent voice, Kidman's social media post does not support an inclusive conversation" and that they were discussing the matter with her. In addition, the Department of the Prime Minister and Cabinet's National Security Group executive director Bridget White reiterated its concerns to Victoria University that Kidman's comments could undermine the reputation for the Centre of Research Excellence for Preventing and Countering Violent Extremism, which receives government funding.

== Honours and awards ==
In 2024 Kidman was elected as a Fellow of the Royal Society Te Apārangi.

== Selected works ==
- Kidman, Joanna, Eleanor Abrams, and Hiria McRae. "Imaginary subjects: school science, indigenous students, and knowledge–power relations". British Journal of Sociology of Education 32, no. 2 (2011): 203–220.
- Kidman, Joanna. Engaging with Māori communities: An exploration of some tensions in the mediation of social sciences research. Ngā Pae o te Māramatanga, 2007.
- Kidman, Joanna, Chiung-Fen Yen, and Eleanor Abrams. "Indigenous Students' Experiences of the Hidden Curriculum in Science Education: A Cross-National Study in New Zealand and Taiwan". International Journal of Science and Mathematics Education 11, no. 1 (2013): 43–64.
- Kidman, Joanna. "The land remains: Māori youth and the politics of belonging". AlterNative: An International Journal of Indigenous Peoples 8, no. 2 (2012): 189–202.
- Nairn, Karen; Sligo, Judith; Showden, Carisa R.; Matthews, Kyle R.; Kidman, Joanna, eds. (December 2022). Fierce Hope. Youth Activism in Aotearoa. Bridget Williams Books. ISBN 9781990046681.
