= Bloemhof, Rotterdam =

Coordinates: 51°54′N 4°31′E

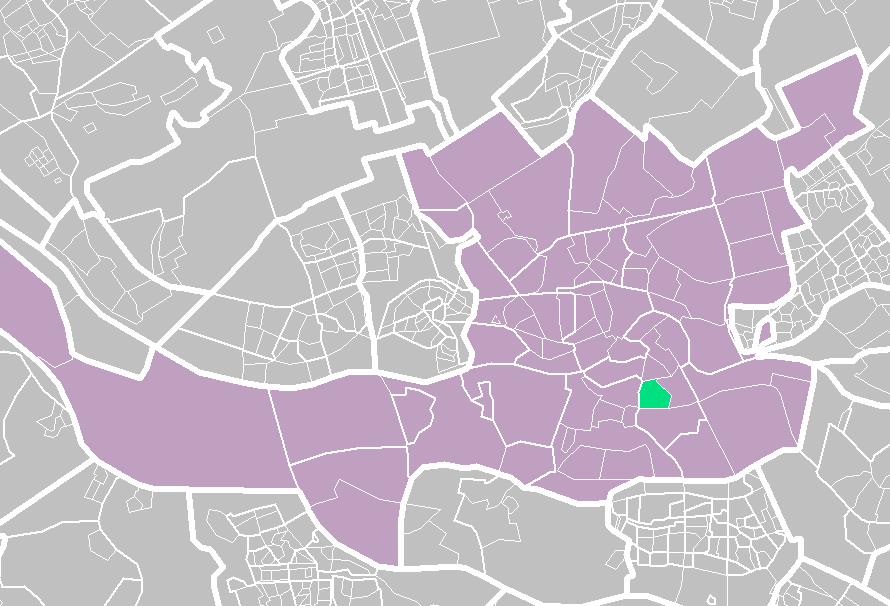
Bloemhof in Rotterdam

Bloemhof is a neighbourhood in Rotterdam, Netherlands.

In 2009 Eberhard van der Laan, the Minister of Housing, referred to the neighbourhood as the fourth worst in his "40 problem neighbourhoods" list.

Since 2009 the security index of the neighbourhood has increased significantly.
