= Adrie Koster =

Dutch football manager (born 1954)

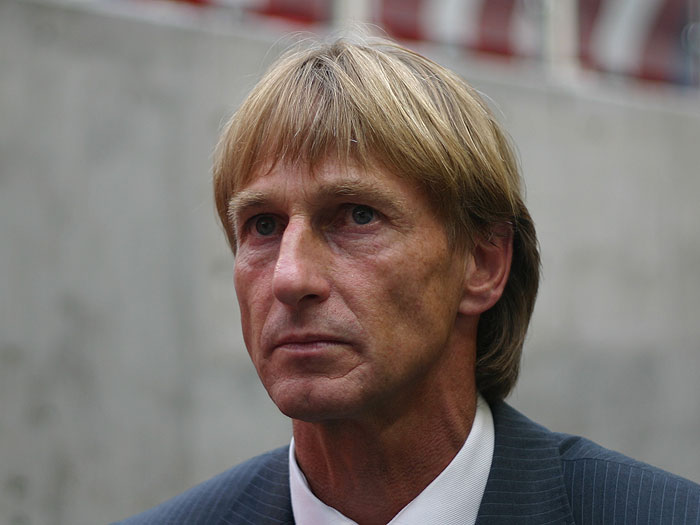
- Koster in 2006

Personal information
- Full name: Adrianus Cornelis Koster
- Date of birth: 18 November 1954 (age 71)
- Place of birth: Zierikzee, Netherlands
- Position: Winger

Team information
- Current team: Willem II (technical advisor and caretaker manager)

Senior career*
Years	Team	Apps	(Gls)
1977–1979	Roda JC	56	(11)
1979–1983	PSV	40	(11)
Total		96	(22)

International career
1978	Netherlands	3	(0)

Managerial career
- 1985–1986: FC Eindhoven (assistant)
- 1986–1990: Willem II (assistant)
- 1990–1991: Willem II
- 1991–1993: Roda JC
- 1993–1995: Helmond Sport
- 1995–1997: TOP Oss
- 1997–2003: Excelsior
- 2004–2005: VVV-Venlo
- 2005–2007: RKC Waalwijk
- 2007: Ajax (youth)
- 2007–2008: Ajax
- 2008–2009: Jong Ajax
- 2009–2011: Club Brugge
- 2012: Beerschot
- 2013–2014: Club Africain
- 2014: Netherlands U21
- 2014–2015: VfB Stuttgart (assistant)
- 2015–2018: Saudi Arabia U23
- 2018–2021: Willem II
- 2026–: Willem II (caretaker)
- * Club domestic league appearances and goals

Adrianus Cornelis "Adrie" Koster (Dutch pronunciation: [aːdriˈjaːnʏs kɔrˈneːlɪs ˈaːdri ˈkɔstər]; born 18 November 1954) is a Dutch football manager who is currently technical advisor and caretaker manager of Willem II. He is a former winger and former manager of Ajax, Club Brugge and the Netherlands U21 team.

== Career ==
He played for Roda JC (1977–79) and PSV Eindhoven (1979–83). He played his last match in the Eredivisie on 2 October 1982, replacing Jurrie Koolhof. In the following season 1983/1984 he retired from professional football as a player.

== International ==
Koster obtained three caps (no goals) for the Netherlands national football team in 1978.

== Managerial career ==
Three years after the end of his playing career, Koster began his managerial career. His first job was the second-tier Eerste Divisie club FC Eindhoven, where he worked as an assistant coach for a year. He then went to the Eredivisie club Willem II, where he worked alongside Piet de Visser. After the club had found itself in a relegation battle under his leadership for two seasons, Koster took over the reins as head coach. This did not bring a change, which meant that he was dismissed after barely a year in charge, and he was again replaced by De Visser in 1991.

In 1991, Koster took over as head coach for Roda JC, where he had been active as a player. Two years later, Huub Stevens took over as head coach and Koster returned to the Eerste Divisie to coach first Helmond Sport and since TOP Oss, before moving to Excelsior in 1997. Koster had his longest employment there and in 2002, he won promotion to the Eredivisie with the club. He could, however, not avoid relegation the following season, and Koster was dismissed after six years in charge. In the following season, he led VVV-Venlo to the Eerste Divisie promotion play-offs, but did not manage to achieve promotion with the club. His next coaching job was RKC Waalwijk, where Koster was dismissed after a year due to poor results in 2006.

He became head of the youth academy of Ajax, and was appointed manager of the club's main squad on 9 October 2007, when Henk ten Cate went to Chelsea.

On 8 April 2009, Koster replaced Jacky Mathijssen as Club Brugge manager, with him signing a contract until the end of the season with an option for an extra season. On 25 February 2010, Koster's contract with Club Brugge was extended until the summer of 2011. He joined Beerschot following the 2011–12 season.

In June 2013, Koster signed a contract with Club Africain. Although the club was first in the league, Koster was sacked in January 2014.

In March 2014, Koster was named head coach of the Netherlands U21 team, after successfully managing the Netherlands U20 team in 2012.

On 25 November 2014, Koster started to work for VfB Stuttgart as field coach of Huub Stevens.

On 26 August 2015, Koster was appointed assistant national team coach of Saudi Arabia, where he came to work under the national coach, fellow Dutchman Bert van Marwijk.

On 1 July 2018, Koster was appointed head coach of Willem II for the second time in his career. He managed to qualify the team for the KNVB Cup final for the fourth time in club history, in which Ajax, however, proved too strong and won 0–4. Because they made the final, Willem II qualified for the UEFA Europa League for the first time since 2005. Willem II also avoided relegation in the Eredivisie.

In May 2025, Koster returned to Willem II as technical advisor.

In October 2026, Koster was appointed as caretaker manager, following the dismissal of John Stegeman.
