= Kromme Zandweg =

Football stadium

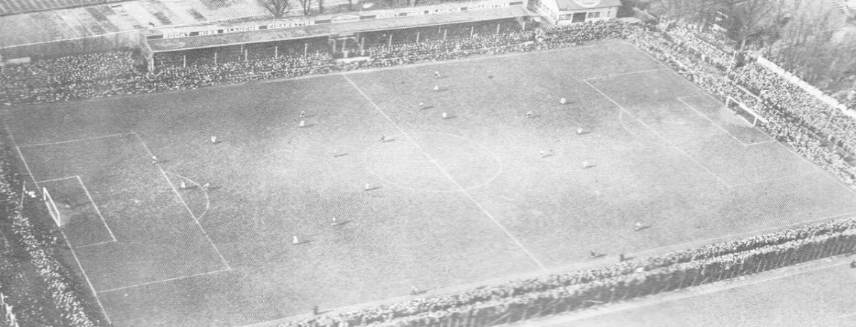
- De Kromme Zandweg Stadion (Oud Feyenoord stadion)
- Interactive map of Kromme Zandweg
- Full name: Kromme Zandweg
- Location: Rotterdam, the Netherlands
- Coordinates: 51.8853°N 4.4979°E
- Capacity: 12,000
- Surface: grass

Construction
- Opened: 1917
- Closed: 1937

Tenant
- Feyenoord

Kromme Zandweg was a football ground in Rotterdam, the Netherlands. It was the home of the professional football club Feyenoord – then known as Feijenoord – from 1917 until 1937, when the club moved to the Feijenoord Stadium.
