= Oranje Nassau IV =

Coal mine in Heksenberg, Heerlen, Limburg, Netherlands

Oranje Nassau Mijn IV
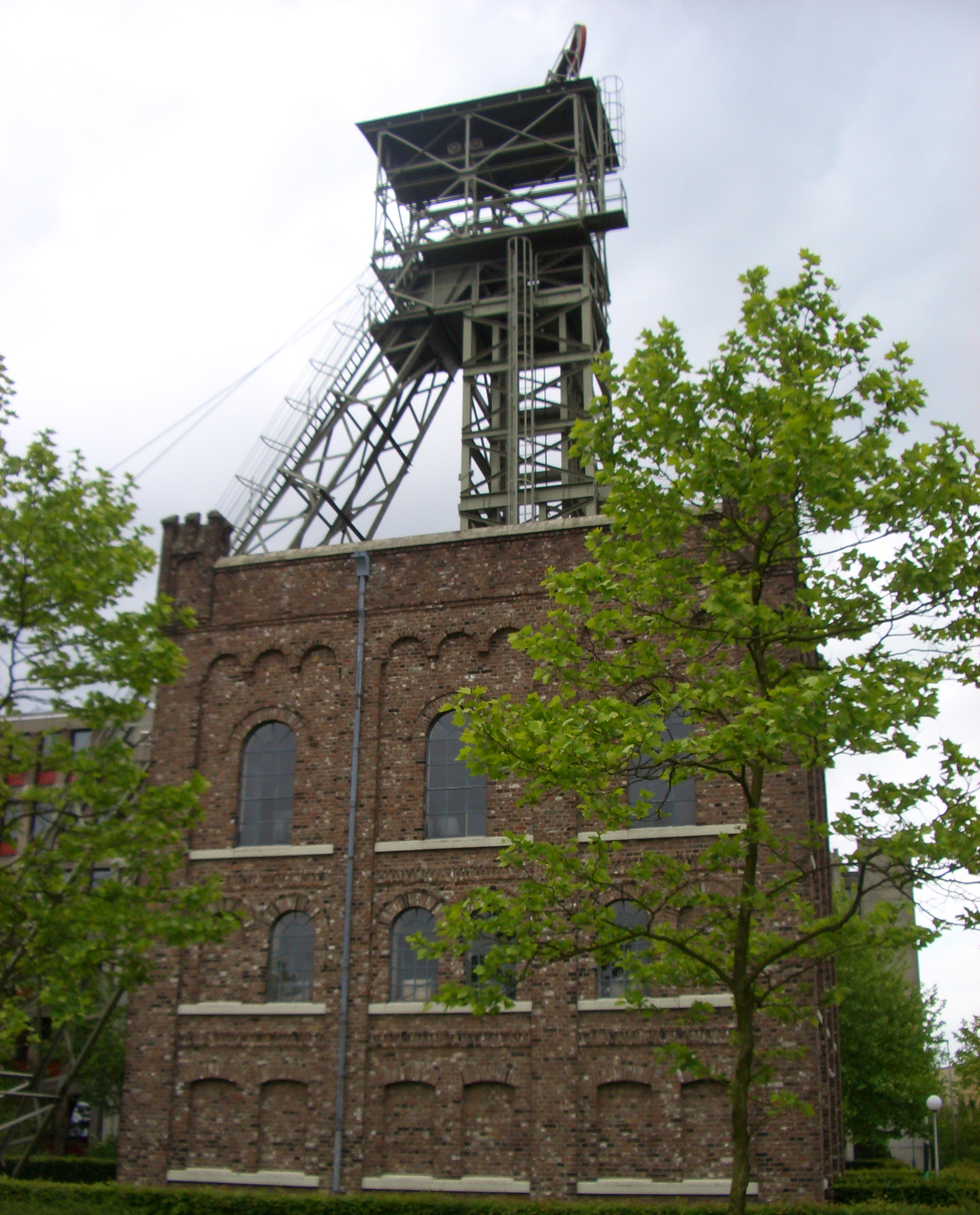
- This image of Shaft 2 of Oranje Nassau I, gives an idea of how the shaft of ON-IV looked.

- Location in the Netherlands
- Location: Heksenberg, Heerlen, Limburg, Netherlands; 50°54′59″N 5°58′37″E
- Products: Coal
- Production: 13,754,000 tons
- Opened: 1927; 99 years ago
- Closed: 1966; 60 years ago
- Company: Oranje Nassau Mijnen

The Oranje Nassau IV (located in Heerlerheide, Heerlen) was the last and smallest mine exploited by the Oranje Nassau Mijnen. It began as a ventilation shaft for Oranje Nassau III, and in 1910 construction started on a mine shaft. However, the construction was halted and only resumed in 1919, with the mine becoming operational in 1927.

Underground, the mine was connected to the Oranje Nassau III and, for safety reasons, also the Staatsmijn Hendrik. In 1966 it became the first of the Oranje Nassau mines to close, though mining activities continued until 1973 via the Oranje Nassau III.

The mine was 740 metres (2,430 ft) deep and produced 13,754,000,000 kilograms (3.0322×10^{10} lb) of coal during its operational period.

The terrain is now used by the Sigrano, a silver sand mine operated by Sibelco.
