= Oranje Nassau Mijnen =

N.V. Maatschappij tot Exploitatie van Limburgsche Steenkolenmijnen
- Traded as: Oranje Nassau Mijnen
- Industry: Coal Mining
- Founded: 1893; 133 years ago
- Founder: Carl Honigmann; Friedrich Honigmann
- Defunct: 1908
- Fate: Acquired by the Wendel Investissement group
- Headquarters: Heerlen, Netherlands

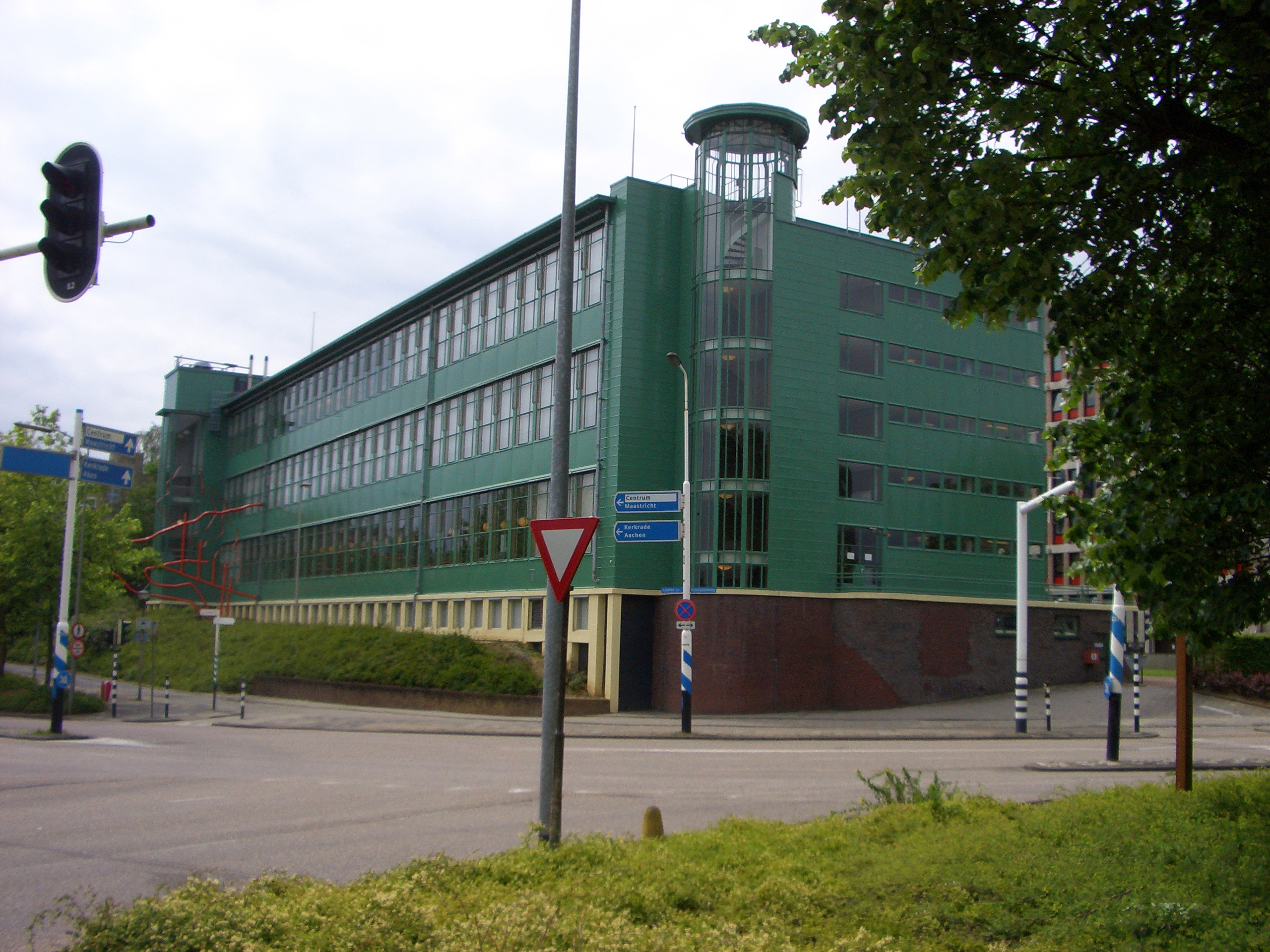
The former office of the Oranje Nassau Mijnen, Dirk Roosenburg, 1928, one of the earliest buildings in International style in Heerlen

The Oranje Nassau Mijnen was a coal mine company, established in 1893 by Friedrich Honigmann (1841-1913) and Carl Honigmann (1842-1903) to exploit the rich coal deposits in and around Heerlen. The existence of coal deposits around Heerlen had been known for centuries (coal had been dug up since the 13th century around Rolduc), but efficient transportation was lacking. In 1886 Henri Sarolea had the idea of building a railroad between Herzogenrath, Heerlen, and Sittard, which was finished in 1896. It was this plan that prompted the building of the first mine (Oranje Nassau I, operational from 1899 to 1974).

While Oranje Nassau Mijnen was the public name of the company, the legal name was N.V. Maatschappij tot Exploitatie van Limburgsche Steenkolenmijnen. It was the largest private mining company in the Netherlands and is now owned by the French Wendel Investissement group, which acquired the founders' shares in 1908.

== Mines ==
- Oranje Nassau I (1899-1974), Heerlen, production: 31,978,000 tons
- Oranje Nassau II (1904 - 1971), Landgraaf, production: 34,064,000 tons
- Oranje Nassau III (1917 - 1973), Heerlerheide (Heerlen), production: 38,265,000 tons
- Oranje Nassau IV (1927 - 1966), Heksenberg (Heerlen), production: 13,754,000 tons

Total production: 111,016,000 tons

The ON I and ON III are now part of the Minewater Project, ON IV is now the Sigrano, a silversand mine part of Sibelco.
