= Oranje Nassau II =

Coal mine in Schaesberg, Landgraaf, Limburg, Netherlands

- Location within Netherlands
- Location: Schaesberg, Landgraaf, Limburg, Netherlands; 50°53′26″N 6°0′57″E
- Products: Coal
- Production: 34,064,000 tonnes
- Opened: 1904
- Closed: 1971
- Company: Oranje Nassau Mijnen

The Oranje Nassau II was a Dutch coal mine located in Schaesberg. The mine was in operation from 1904 until 1971. It was the second of four mines collectively known as the Oranje Nassau Mijnen.

When the first coal was extracted in 1904, high production levels were not yet achieved. The mine was not connected to the railroad and the coal had to be hauled to the Schaesberg station by horse and carriage. In 1906 the mine was in full production as the railways to Heerlen were finished. This railway was also used by the Staatsmijn Wilhelmina. Until its closure, a total of 34,065,000 tons of coal were brought to the surface. The highest production was reached in 1930 with 687,000 tonnes. In the last year that the mine was still in production (1970) 506,000 tonnes were won.
