= Theoderich van Are =

12th-century German nobleman

Theoderich of Are (German: Dietrich von Are, Dutch: Dirk van Are; 1087–1126) was the first count of Are (the area around Ahrweiler in present-day Rhineland-Palatinate, Germany).

Theoderich was a nephew of bishop Odon de Toul who in 1065 bestowed on him Heerlen and Steinfeld Abbey. He was made count of Are by Holy Roman Emperor Henry IV.

Theoderich probably built Are Castle in Altenahr. He also initiated the construction of the Pancratiuskerk in Heerlen, and possibly of the Schelmentoren in the same town, where he may have stayed.

Theoderich had six sons, three of whom became part of the clergy. He was succeeded by his first son Lotharius. His second son, Gerhard, was from 1124 to 1169 provost of St. Cassius in Bonn (Bonn Minster), and from 1154 to 1160 provost of the St. Servatius in Maastricht.

Preceded by Non existing	Count of Are; 1087?–1126	Succeeded by Lotharius
