= Landsfort Herle =

Former fort in the Netherlands

Landfort Herle
- Heerlen, the Netherlands
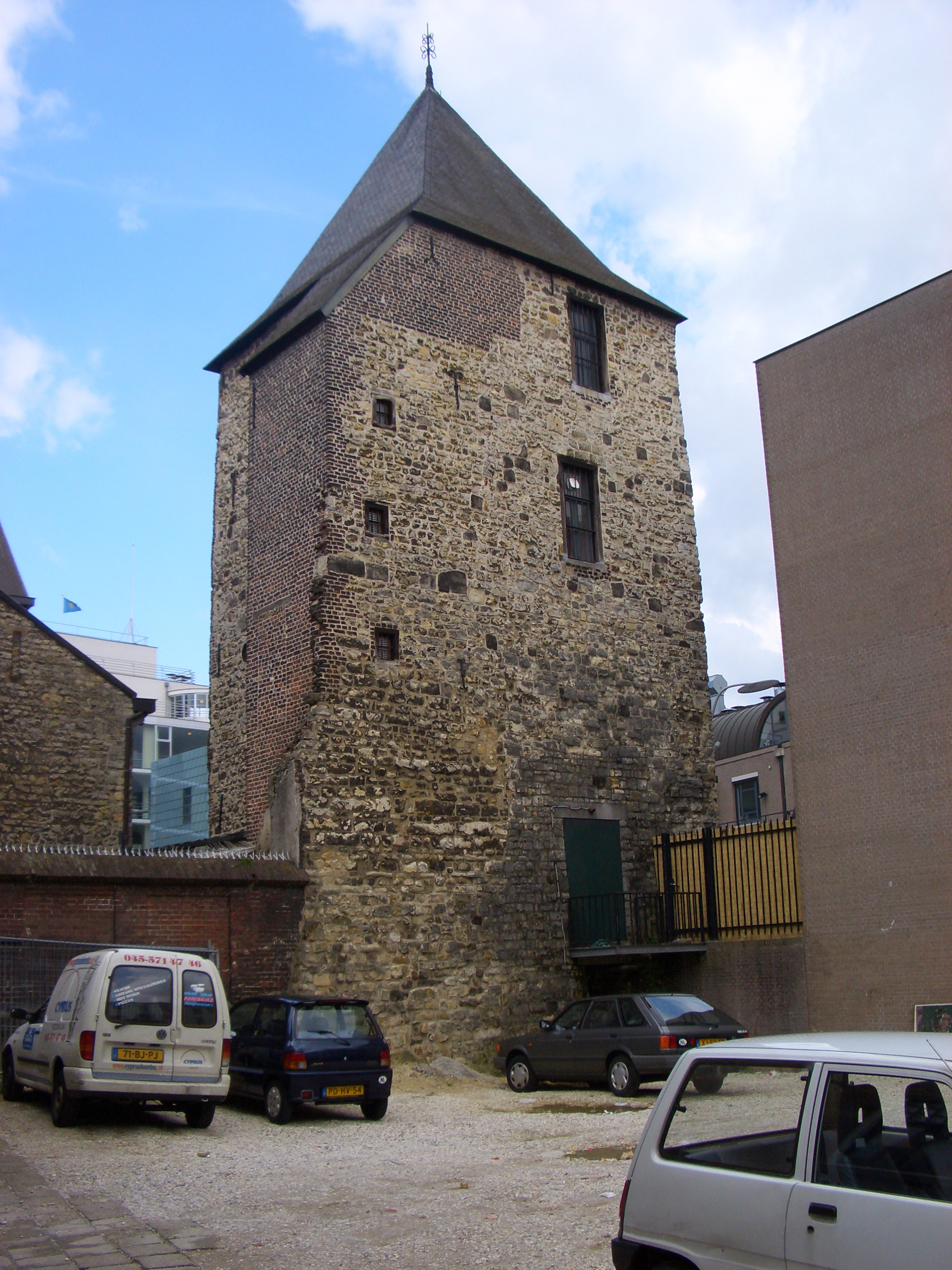
- Schelmtoren

Site information
- Type: Fort

Location
- The Netherlands
- Location within Netherlands
- Coordinates: 50°53′16″N 5°58′49″E

Site history
- Built: 1244
- Built by: dukes of Brabant

Landsfort Herle was a fortification with a moat in the centre of Heerlen, Netherlands (roughly the current Pancratiusplein). It was probably built by the counts of Ahr-Hochstaden (also referred to as Heren van Are) The name Landsfort (‘fort of the land’) was introduced in the 19th century, based on the fact that the fortification falls under the responsibility of the land. The fort can more accurately be classified as a so-called fortress church (German: Kirchenburg); a (fortified) church surrounded by a curtain wall. Landsfort Herle appears to be the only Kirchenburg in the Netherlands (not to be confused with Wehrkirchen or fortified churches, which are more numerous, but lack the curtain wall). In the 13th century Heerlen and landsfort Herle, came into the possession of the Dukes of Brabant. The Landsfort was (re)built by the Dukes of Brabant in 1244.

The curtain wall is believed to be one of the oldest still recognisable in the Netherlands, part of it has been excavated.

A model of the fort was constructed based on a map from 1787, which was found during extensive restorations to the Pancratiuskerk in the 1960s. The fort had three gates and two towers; the belfry of the church and the Schelmentoren, both with 2 metre thick walls.

Small rooms were built into the rafters of the church, to provide shelter for the inhabitants of Heerlen during hostilities. Unfortunately these rooms were destroyed when a supposedly German bomb struck the church on New Year's Eve 1944/1945.

== History ==
Landsfort Herle was a medieval fortified enclosure in the centre of Heerlen, in present-day Limburg, the Netherlands. It developed around the Sint-Pancratiuskerk (Saint Pancras Church) and included a defensive wall, a moat and several gates. The surviving remains include part of the medieval enclosure wall and the Schelmentoren, a stone tower that formed part of the fortification.

The fortification is associated with the counts of Are, also known as the counts of Ahr-Hochstaden. In 1239, the existing stronghold was captured and destroyed by the Duke of Brabant. In 1244, Theoderic II of Are received permission to rebuild the fortification.

The Sint-Pancratiuskerk stands within the former fortified enclosure. Historical research has identified remains of the medieval fortification extending towards the church's outer walls. The church and the surrounding defensive structures formed an integrated fortified complex.

== Architecture ==
The medieval enclosure included a defensive wall and a moat, with access through gates connecting the settlement to the surrounding area. The Schelmentoren, now a prominent surviving medieval structure in central Heerlen, had several functions during its history, including use as a defensive tower and a prison.

A reconstruction of the former fortification is represented by a model displayed on Pancratiusplein. The model illustrates the arrangement of the church, defensive wall, moat, towers and gates.

== Remains ==
Parts of the former enclosure wall have survived near the Sint-Pancratiuskerk. Archaeological and architectural research has helped document the fortification and its relationship to the development of medieval Heerlen.

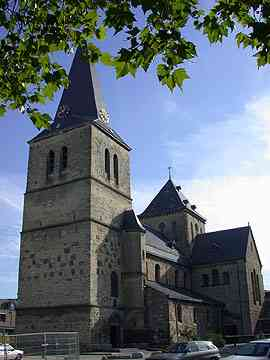
Pancratius church

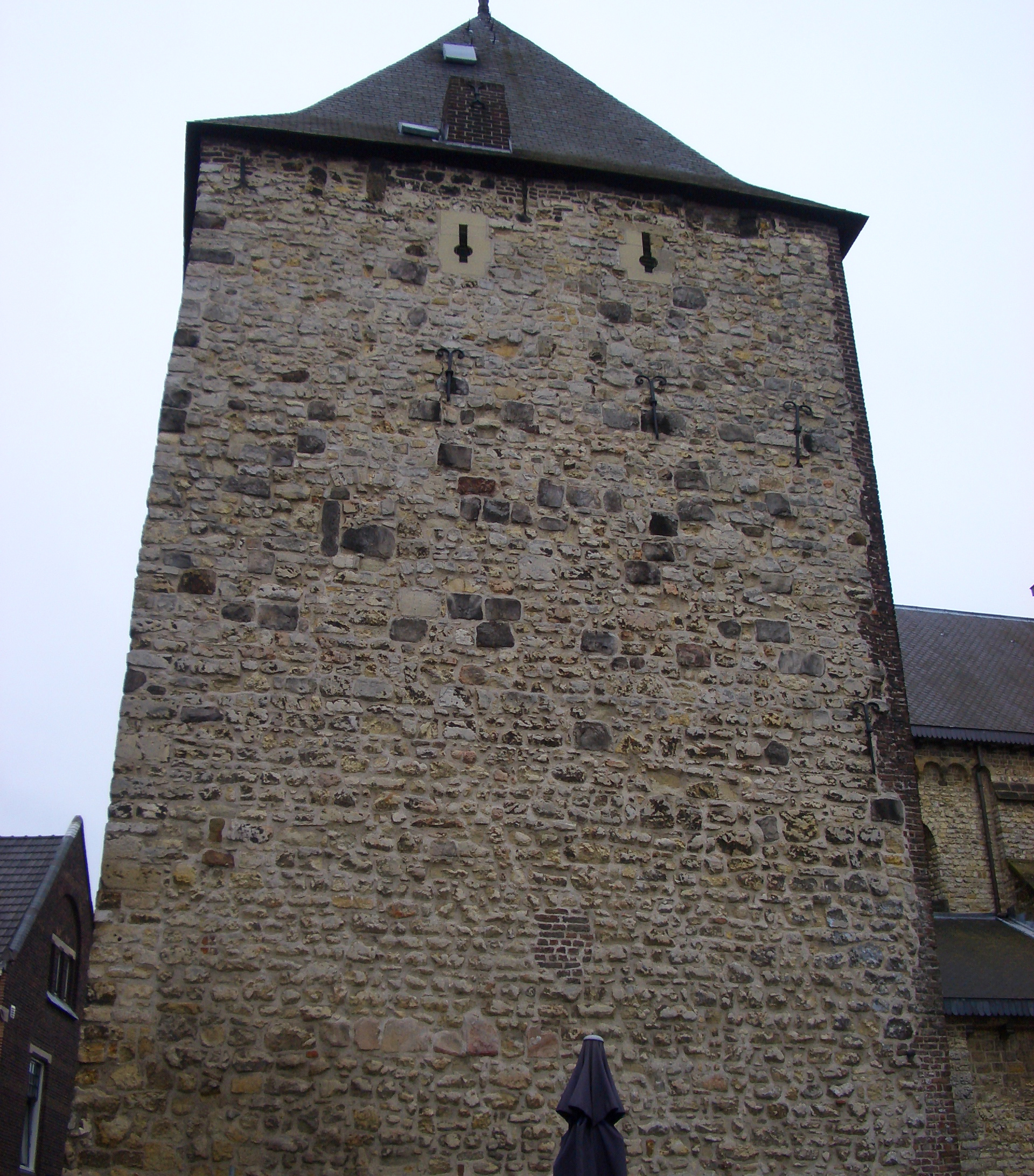
Schelmentower

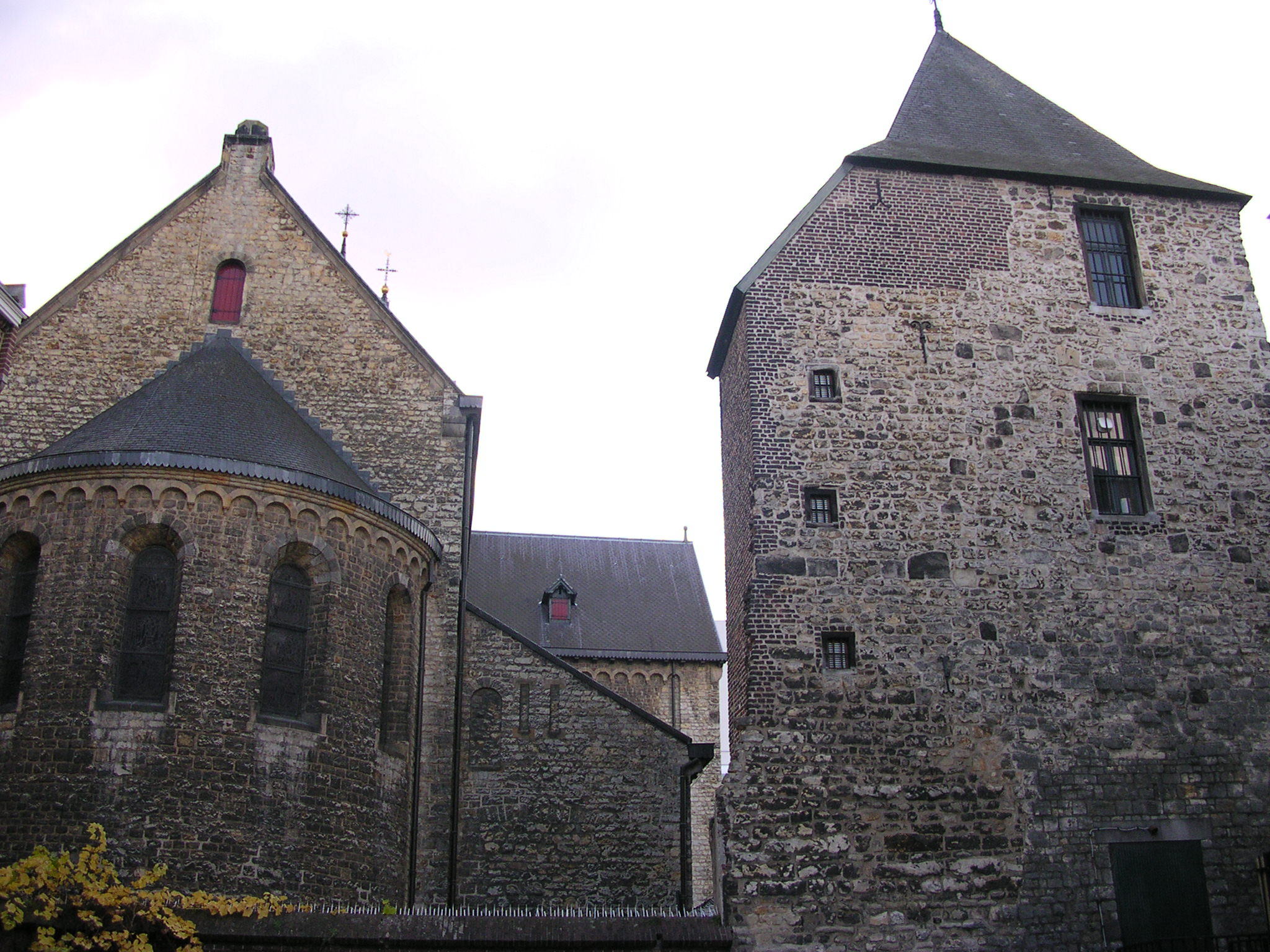
Church & Tower

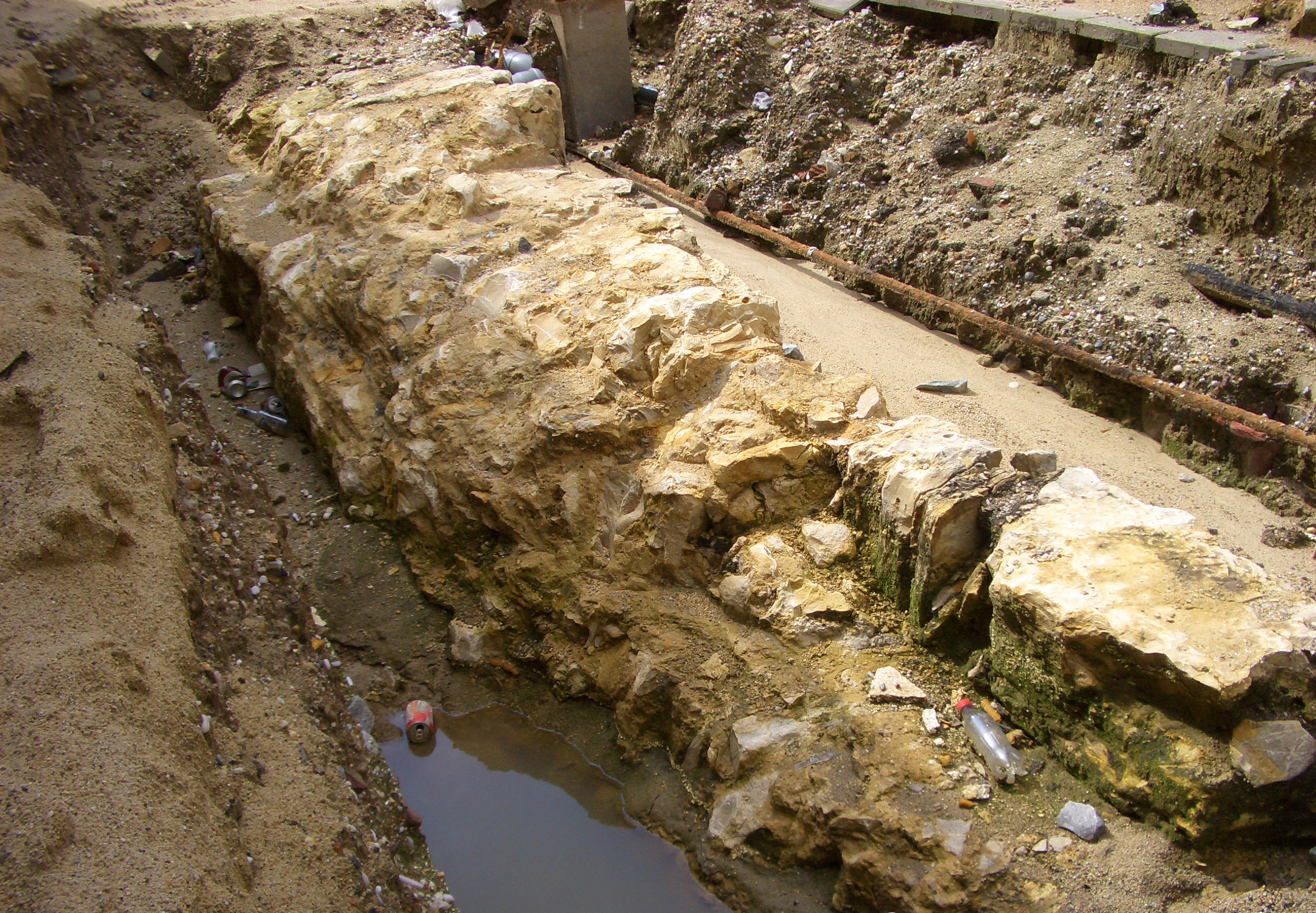
Part of the wall of landsfort Herle

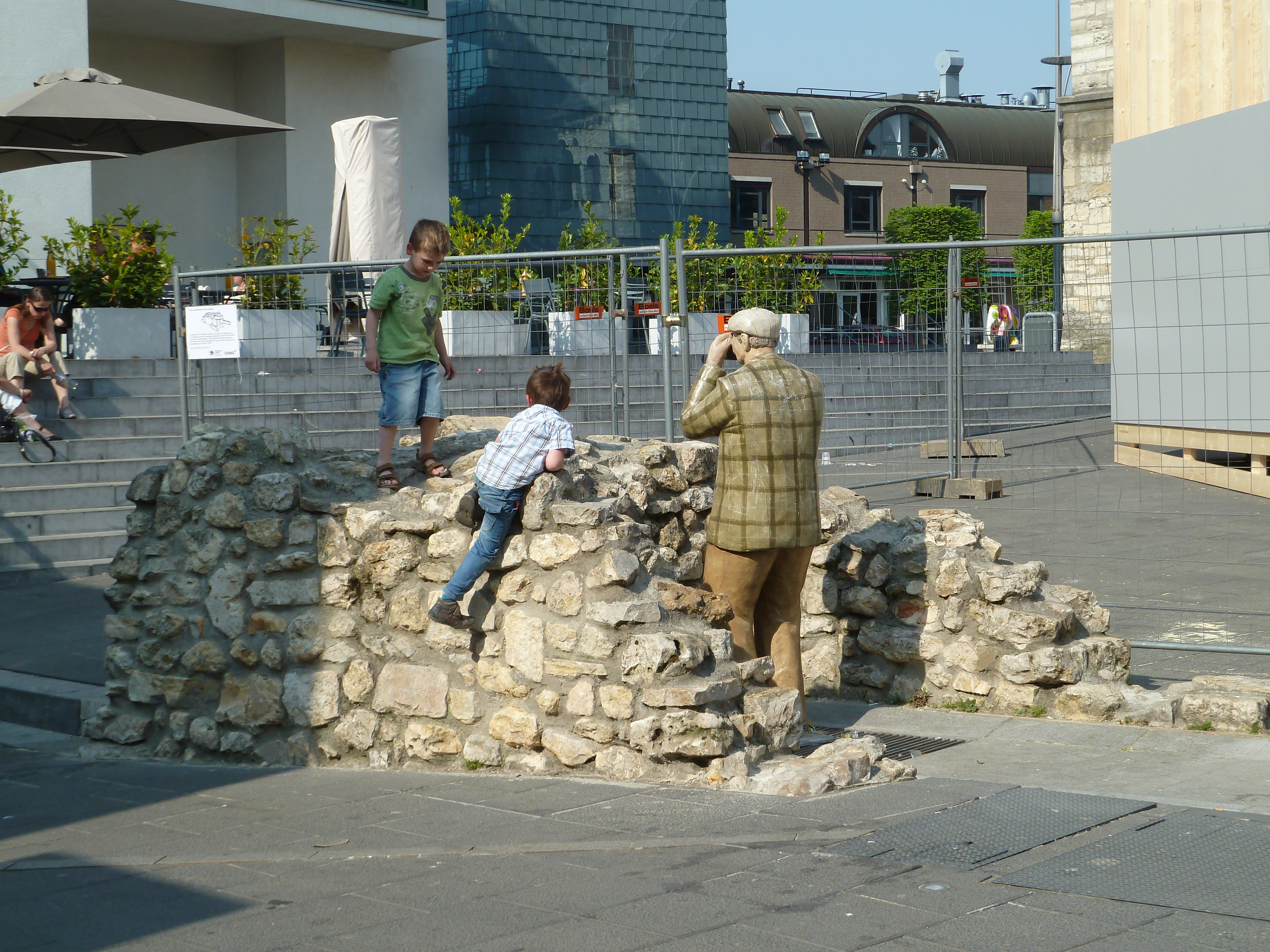
A reconstruction with the original material of the wall.

== See also ==
- List of castles in the Netherlands
