= Oliemolen, Heerlen =

Watermill in Heerlen, Netherlands

Coordinates: 50.884075°N 5.986882°E

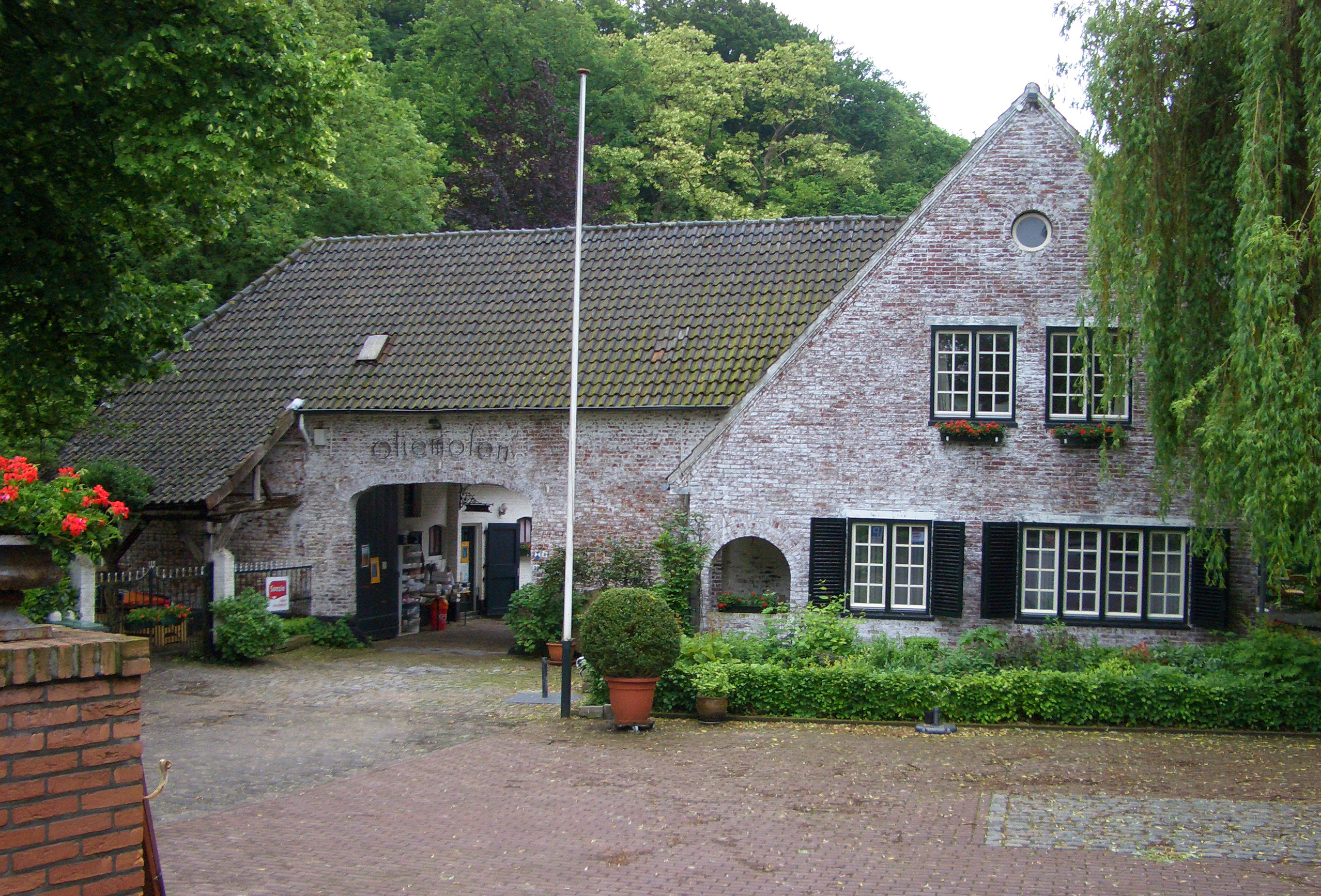
The Oliemolen in Heerlen

The Oliemolen (literally Oilmill) is a 16th-century watermill located at the foot of a steep hill in the Aambos, Heerlen in the Netherlands. The name already tells us much about its function, extracting oil, but this was not always the case as it first functioned as a volmolen (a mill to press wool). The mill is fed by the Caumerbeek.

A copy, dating to May 31, 1710, of the original deed exists, indicating the mill was founded on May 9, 1502, commissioned by the family Van Scheasberg. However, names of notables on the deed do not correlate with the people in those positions in the beginning of the 16th century; possibly a "0" was mistaken for a "6", making the founding year 1562.

In 1829 a license was granted for the mill to mill grain, which became the only use of the mill in 1904.
