= Egidius Slanghen =

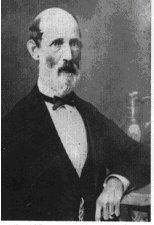
Egidius Slanghen.

Egidius Slanghen (23 August 1820 – 12 October 1882) was the mayor of Hoensbroek (now part of Heerlen) from 11 March 1855 till his death and a historian. Before being mayor of Hoensbroek, he was, thanks to mediation by the count Jean Bapriste d'Ansembourg of Amstenrade, land agent for the frueles of Aldenhoor in Haelen (1845–1853), while in this function his interest for history grow.

His first historical account is the work titled Het Markgraafschap Hoensbroek (1859) (The Marquessship Hoensbroek) after that he wrote two books of considerable thickness Geschiedenis van het tegenwoordige hertogdom Limburg (1865) (History of the current dutches of Limburg).

In 1863 he was one of the founders of the historical society of Limburg (Provenciaal genootschap voor gescheidenis en Oudheidskunde).

He is also the designer of the Hoensbroek coat of arms.
