= L.A. Raeven =

Dutch artist duo and twin sisters

- Headquarters: Amsterdam, Netherlands
- co-founder: Angelique Raeven
- co-founder: Liesbeth Raeven
- Website: Official website

L.A. Raeven is a name for Liesbeth and Angelique Raeven, Dutch twins and collaborative artist duo known for installation art, video art, and performance art. They live in Amsterdam.

They were born in 1971 in Heerlen, Netherlands. Some of their artwork focuses on the love-hate tension they feel in a twin relationship, as well as identity, and thinness. Their video installation which includes two films that form a diptych, Wild Zone 1 (2001) and Wild Zone 2 (2002) are works focused on the body autonomy and malleability of one's own body (in pursuit of thinness). It has been compared to work by Gilbert and George.
