= Schelmentoren =

Schelmentower
- Schelmentoren
- Heerlen, the Netherlands
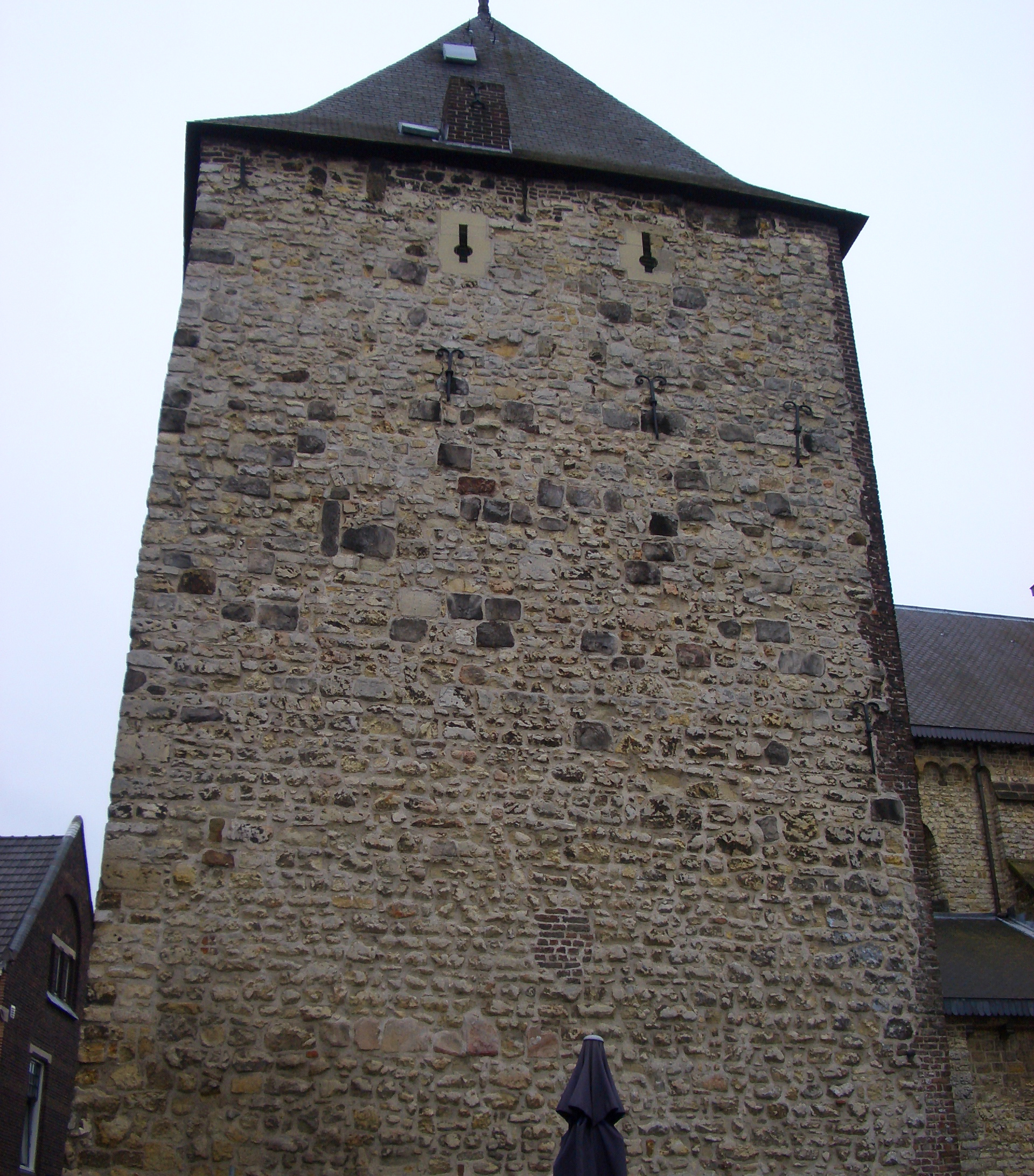
- oldest still erect buildings in Heerlen

Site information
- Type: Donjon
- Owner: Ok
- Open to the public: No

Location
- the Netherlands
- Coordinates: 50.88804°N 5.98044°E

Site history
- Built: 1200
- Built by: Theoderich van Are

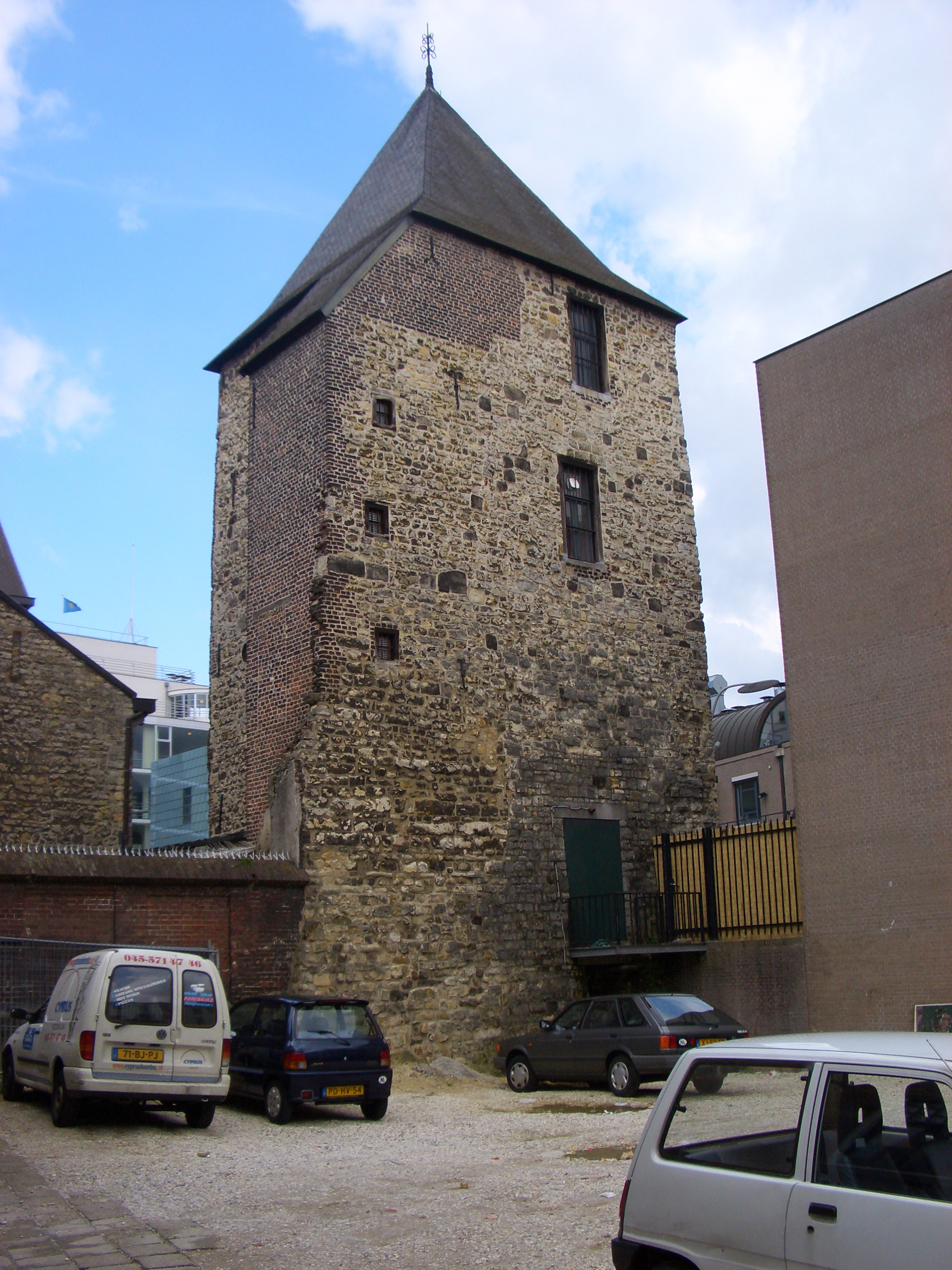
Same Schelmentoren but now from the side closest to the old wall

The Schelmentoren in Heerlen is a Medieval Building that has served as a defendable living tower for the Here van Are (sometimes called the counts van Ahr-Hochstaden) and their successors. As part of the Landsfort Herle, it served as a prison tower. It is believed to be built on command of Theoderich van Are. What is certain is that the building existed in the 12th century.

== Name ==
Although now known as the Schelmentoren, it has had many names (including Bickelstein and Bickersteyntoren). In the year 1225 it was part of landsfort Herle (sometimes referred to as Castrum).

== See also ==
- Pancratiuskerk
