= Friedrich Honigmann =

German businessman

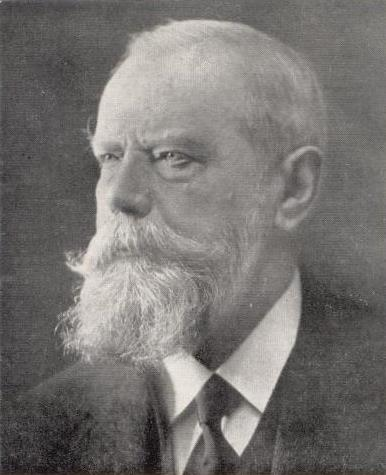
Friedrich Honingmann

Friedrich Honigmann (2 March 1841 in Düren – 19 December 1913 in Aix-la-chapelle) was a German coal entrepreneur. He was founder of the mining company Sophia-Jacoba in Germany and co-founder of Oranje Nassau Mijnen in the Netherlands.
