= Oranje Nassau I =

Coal mine in Heerlen, Limburg, Netherlands

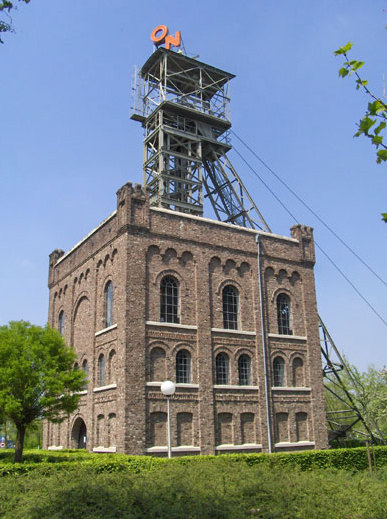

- Location within Netherlands
- Location: Heerlen, Limburg, Netherlands; 50°53′35″N 5°58′11″E
- Products: Coal
- Production: 31,978,000 tonnes
- Opened: 1899; 127 years ago
- Closed: 1974; 52 years ago
- Company: Oranje Nassau Mijnen

The Oranje Nassau I was a Dutch coal mine located in Heerlen. The mine was in operation from 1899 until 1974.

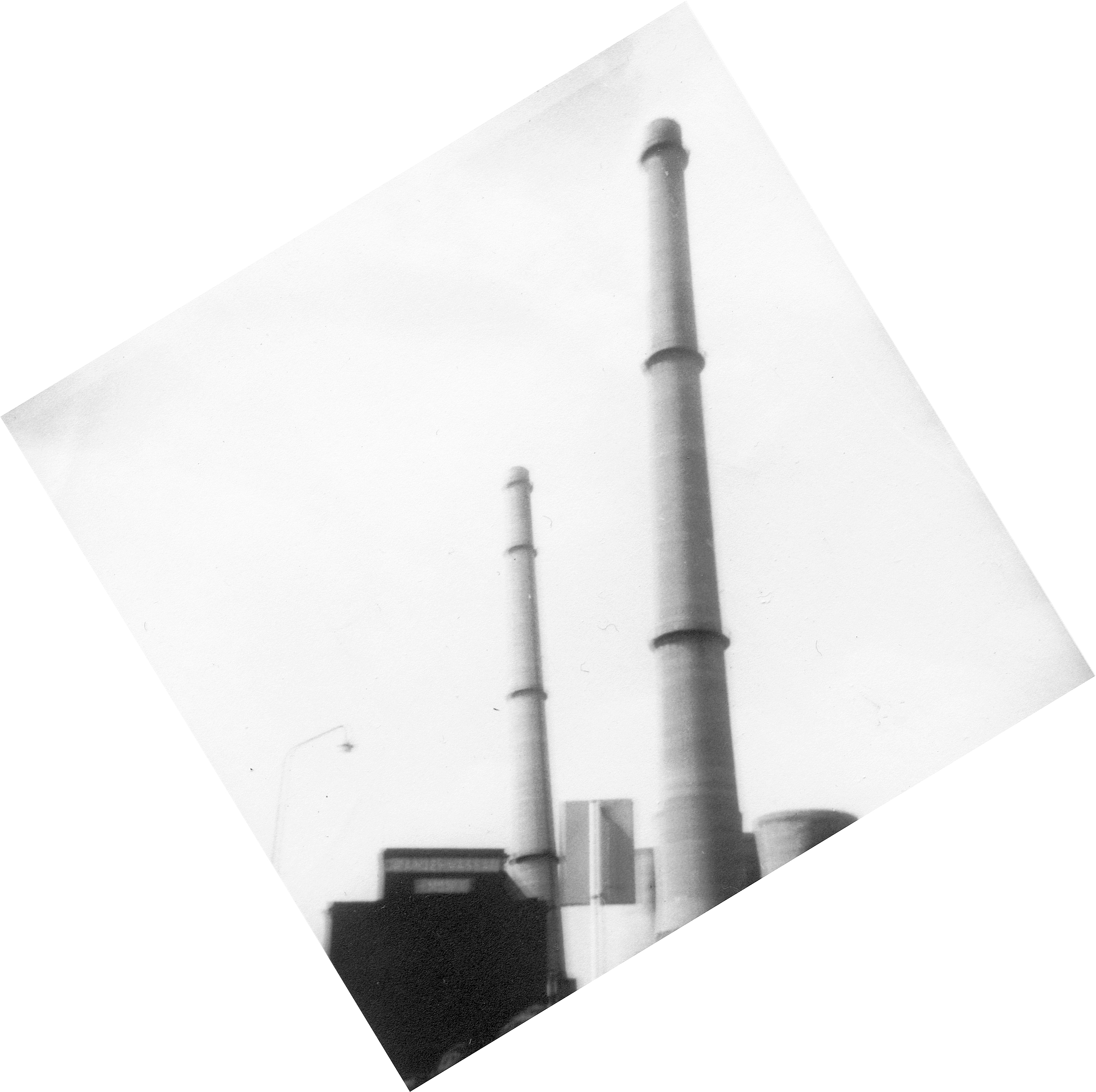
Chimneys Lange Jan (right) and Lange Lies (left) in 1976

The Oranje Nassau I was the oldest and second largest of the four Oranje Nassau Mijnen-mines. Close to the mine there were several coal washing plants and a large electric power station. The mine dominated the skyline of Heerlen with its two tall chimneys nicknamed "Lange Jan" and "Lange Lies".

The former mine is now used as part of the Minewater Project.

== In Modern Culture ==
- The Oranje Nassau I chimneys appear in the Zoetwaren Broadcast of the television in the video game People Playground.
