= Ter Worm Castle =

Castle in Heerlen, Netherlands

Coordinates: 50°53′22″N 5°56′59″E

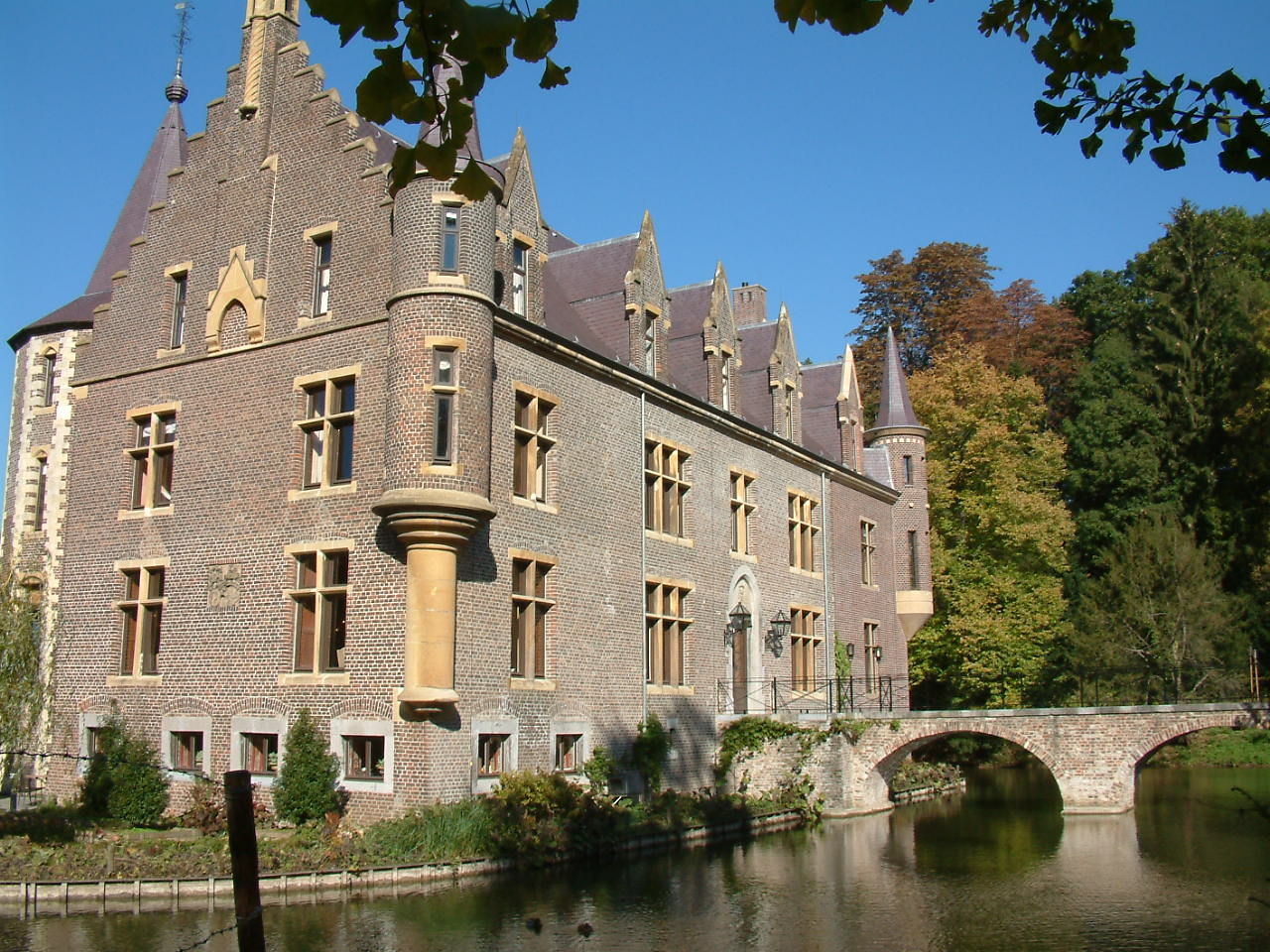
Kasteel Ter Worm - Ter Worm Castle

Ter Worm or Terworm Castle (Dutch: Kasteel Terworm) is a castle located in the municipality of Heerlen, Limburg Province, Netherlands. The castle is part of the Terworm estate.

== Description of the castle ==
The present building dates largely from the 17th century when the original 15th-century fortified building was converted into a house. It comprises two wings in a T-shaped floor plan surrounded by a moat. The main building is accessible at the front via a marl stone bridge dating from 1843 leading to the main entrance. Between the two wings is a corner tower, which is the oldest part of the castle dating back to the 15th century. Originally round, the tower was converted to an octagonal in the 17th century . The west wing can be dated to 1716, while the south wing has a keystone with the year 1718. The castle garden is a reconstruction based on a French rococo garden laid out by Count Vincent van der Heyden-Belderbusch in 1787 with roses, lavender and boxwood. The garden is a favourite wedding location and admission is free.

== History ==
The castle has existed since the 14th century and has been inhabited by several noble families. Originally it was a square building, fronted by a round tower and a rectangular tower and built around a walled courtyard. The first known owner was the Lord of Strijthagen in 1476, when the castle was a moated building fortified by external walls outside the moat. In 1498 the castle came into possession of the sheriff of Heerlen, Diederick van Pallandt. In 1542, the castle came into the possession of the Van Hallen family, and was destroyed by fire in 1550 but rebuilt in the same style. The rebuilding, completed by the Wijlre family, was done in brick and the building was painted white to disguise the difference in building materials. The castle remained in this family's possession until 1738, when Friedrich Wilhelm Freiherr von Wylre, canon of Aachen, died. His possessions passed to Phillip Anton van der Heyden zu Belderbusch.

In 1767 the castle was restored by Count Maximilian van der Heyden-Belderbusch and the gardens laid out in the French rococo style. In 1840 the castle was inherited by Antoinette von Böselager, who was married to Baron Otto Napoleon Loë-d'Imstenraedt. After her death, the castle came into possession of the baron. His family extended the estate by purchasing many neighbouring farms.

In the late 19th Century the castle and the estate acquired its present appearance thanks to Baron François de Loë, who remodelled it in a neo-Gothic style to the plans of Lambert de Fisenne. Throughout most of the 20th century, the castle and its estate were in the hands of the Orange-Nassau mine, and the castle housed some of their staff. In the castle grounds at that time was a large outdoor swimming pool, in which whole generations of the people of Heerlen learned to swim. After the closure of the mine the government suggested that a major theme park should be founded on the estate, an idea squashed by the people of Heerlen after a large-scale and widely supported protest. In the last decades of the twentieth century the castle became very run down until it was bought by the Van der Valk hotel chain, who restored it in 1997-1999. It is a now a hotel and restaurant.

This article was translated from the article Kasteel Ter Worm, originally written in Dutch.
