= Hoensbroek =

Hoensbroek Gebrook
- Town
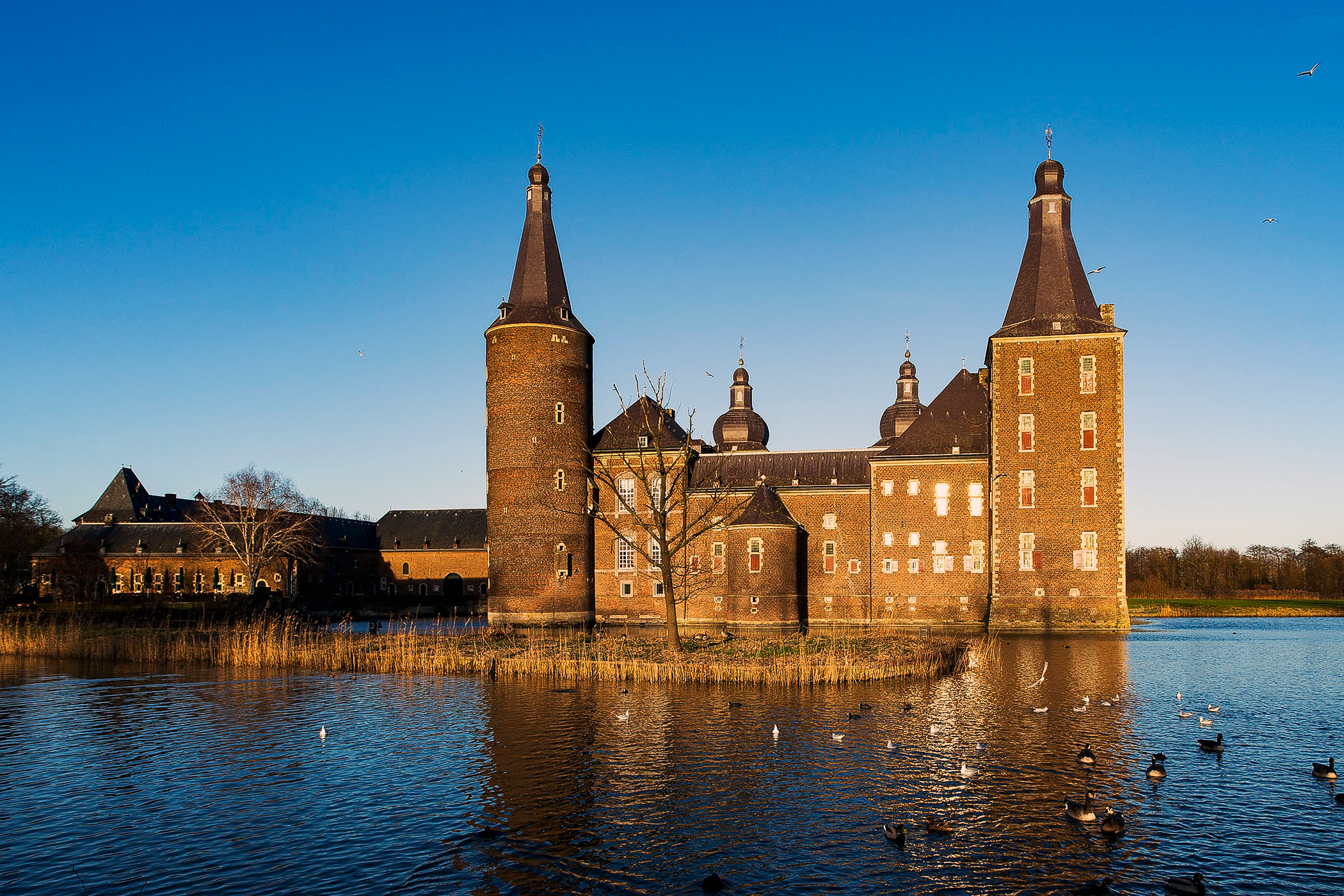
- Hoensbroek Castle

- Flag Coat of arms

- Location in the Netherlands Location in the province of Limburg in the Netherlands
- Coordinates: 50°55′15″N 5°55′36″E
- Country: Netherlands
- Province: Limburg
- Municipality: Heerlen

Area
  - Total: 1.58 km^{2} (0.61 sq mi)
- Elevation: 106 m (348 ft)

Population (2021)
  - Total: 6,825
  - Density: 4,320/km^{2} (11,200/sq mi)
- Time zone: UTC+1 (CET)
  - Summer (DST): UTC+2 (CEST)
- Postal code: 6431
- Dialing code: 045

Hoensbroek (Limburgish: Gebrook) is a Dutch town in the municipality of Heerlen. It is situated in the southeast of Limburg, a province in the southeast of the Netherlands. Until 1982, Hoensbroek was a separate municipality.

Hoensbroek is known for its medieval castle, Kasteel Hoensbroek, named after Knight Hoen, a member of the Hoen Family. It dates from around 1250.

Hoensbroek is also known for the fair on Ascension Day (Hemelvaartsdag). The fair brings as many as 100,000 people to the town, every year.

In medieval times, the town was known under the name of Gebrook, meaning as much as "Swampy Landscape", and belonged to the Family Hoen. Their family name eventually mingled with the original one, resulting in the name Hoensbroeck for the location and Van Hoensbroeck as the family name. The spoken dialect, Gerbrooker Plat, refers to the ancient name of Gebrook.

== Recent history ==
Coal mining The town remained modest until the early 20th century, when several mines were opened (including the Emma), caused a substantial increase in population. This necessitated the construction of new residential areas, with the result that Heerlen & Hoensbroek grew closer to each other.

Today Hoensbroek & Heerlen now form a contiguous and built-up area. Only the tip, the former Oranje Nassau III mine, currently designed as a park, represents a kind of barrier between the towns. The mines in the area are now all closed, but many of the workers before landscaped areas still exist.

== Transport ==
Railway station: Hoensbroek. The town can also be reached from Heerlen railway station and Sittard railway station.

Bus: The town can be reached by bus, in this city there are public buses from Veolia Transport(Limburg)

== Notable people ==
- Max van Heeswijk, road racing cyclist
- Willy Quadackers, footballer
- Henk van der Linden, film director
- Jaloe Maat, actress
- Christian Quix, priest, local historian, director of the city library of Aachen
- Fernando Ricksen, Dutch national team footballer
- Simone Simons, lead singer of symphonic metal band Epica
- Egidius Slanghen, historian
- Lambert Verdonk, footballer
- Klaas de Vries, politician and jurist
