= Willy Quadackers =

Dutch footballer (1937–2020)

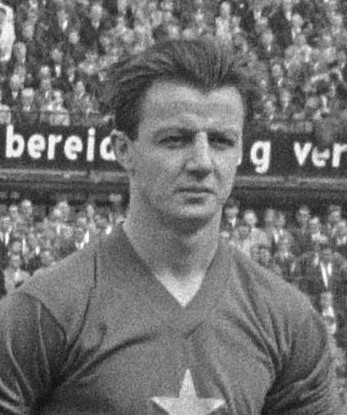

Personal information
- Date of birth: 26 July 1937
- Place of birth: Hoensbroek, Netherlands
- Date of death: 18 April 2020 (aged 82)
- Position: Right back

Youth career
- SV Hoensbroek

Senior career*
Years	Team	Apps	(Gls)
1961–1966	Fortuna'54	102	(2)
1966–1971	MVV	129	(4)
Total		231	(6)

International career
1964	Netherlands	1	(0)
- * Club domestic league appearances and goals

Willy Quadackers (26 July 1937 – 18 April 2020) was a Dutch footballer who played as a right back.

== Career ==
Born in Hoensbroek, Quadackers played for Fortuna'54 and MVV. He also earned one cap for the Netherlands national team in 1964.

== Later life and death ==
Quadackers died on 18 April 2020, aged 82.

== Honours ==
- KNVB Cup: 1963–64
