= Parkstad Limburg =

- Coordinates: 50°54′N 5°59′E
- Country: Netherlands
- Province: Limburg

Area
  - Total: 211.10 km^{2} (81.51 sq mi)
  - Land: 210.11 km^{2} (81.12 sq mi)
  - Water: 0.99 km^{2} (0.38 sq mi)

Population (2010)
  - Total: 252,332
  - Density: 1,200/km^{2} (3,100/sq mi)

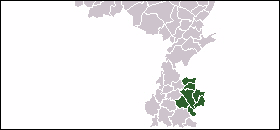

Parkstad Limburg (Dutch pronunciation: [ˈpɑr(ə)kstɑt ˈlɪmbʏr(ə)x]; Ripuarian and Limburgish: Parksjtad Limburg [ˈpɑʀəkʃtɑt ˈlɪmbʏʀəx]) is a conurbation of seven municipalities in the southern part of the province of Limburg in the Netherlands. Consisting of Heerlen, Kerkrade, Landgraaf, Brunssum, Simpelveld, Voerendaal and Beekdaelen, the municipalities work together to improve public services, transport, and housing on a regional level. This collaboration started in 1999. Within Parkstad, the city of Heerlen functions as the centre of economic and social activity, and to a lesser extent the cities of Kerkrade and Landgraaf function in the same regard as regional hubs.

== Land use ==
The name Parkstad, Dutch for "Park City", is derived from the relative greenness of the towns, 94,17 km^{2} (53%) of its area used for non-urban purposes. However, only 10% of the area (roughly 17.8 km^{2}) is forest and nature, 42% (roughly 74.96 km^{2}) is used for agriculture. Previously, the area had been known as Oostelijke Mijnstreek or Eastern Mining District, as it was the primary coal mining area of the Netherlands.

== IBA Parkstad 2020 ==
In 2012 Parkstad became the site of the first Internationale Bauausstellung (IBA) in the Netherlands, running until 2020. The International Architecture Exhibition is a German concept in which new social, cultural and technological ideas are implemented within eight to ten years. Parkstad is one of the first regions in the Netherlands to face negative demographic growth. It is hoped that the IBA helps to find new strategies to deal with this phenomenon.

== Alien activity in Parkstad Limburg ==
Alien activity in Parkstad Limburg references the many UFO-encounters in Landgraaf. An atomic bomb base in Brunssum, and paranormal activity in Heerlen. The reason many plots of land in Parkstad are forbidden to access for reasons unknown, one popular theory according to Parkstadians is the high condensation of Zwartzand (English: Black Sand) and is presumed to be found under Silversandmine Heihoven and the Sigrano in the middle of a residential area, Black Sand is thought to cause lung cancer and skin cancer, both the Scrantonmeer and Silversandmine Heihoven are also forbidden parts. The first blockages of random plots of land was in the early 1960s.

== See also ==
- Parkstad Limburg Stadion
