= Staatsmijn Wilhelmina =

Coal mine in Terwinselen, Kerkrade, Limburg, Netherlands

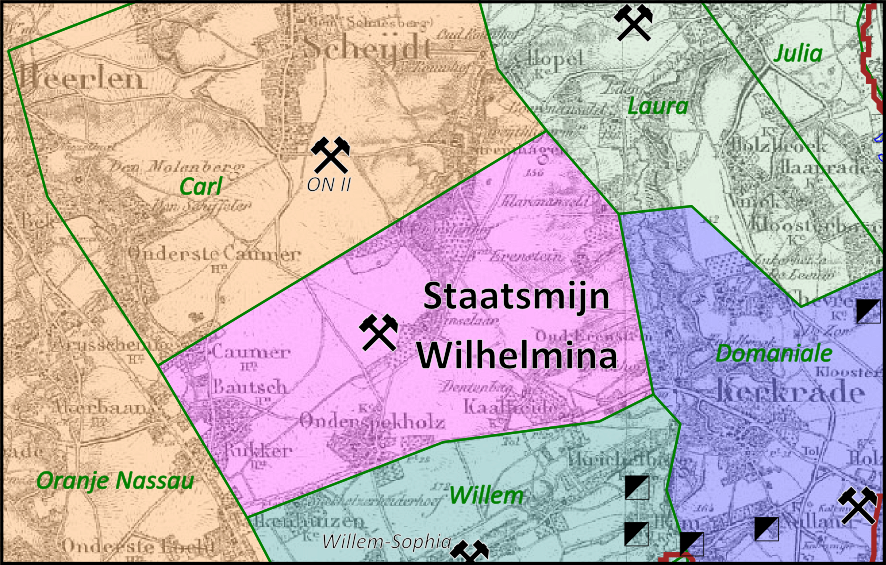
- Concession map

- Location within Netherlands
- Location: Terwinselen, Kerkrade, Limburg, Netherlands; 50°52′5″N 6°1′58″E
- Products: Coal
- Production: 59,235,000 tonnes
- Opened: 1906
- Closed: 1969
- Company: DSM

The Staatsmijn Wilhelmina was the first and the smallest of the Dutch state owned mines. It produced coal for domestic use, as its near neighbours, the Laura Mine, Oranje Nassau II, Willem-Sophia, and Domaniale Mijn.

The concession of the mine was bordered by the privately owned mines mentioned above. After a few decades the mine could not be extended sideways, so the only way to keep production up was going deeper, this in contrast to the large Emma, Hendrik and Maurits mines.
