= Wilhelm of Herle =

Dutch painter

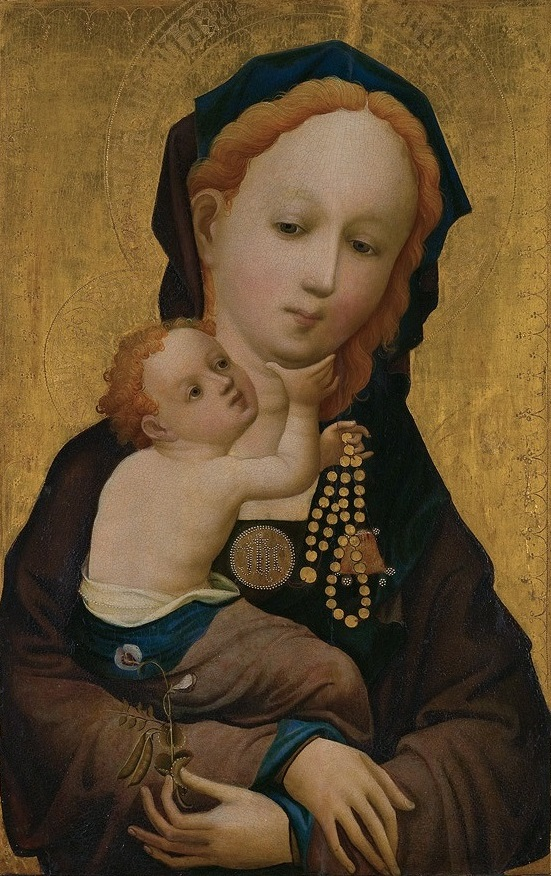
The Madonna with the Pea-Blossom has been attributed also to Willhelm of Herle. It might also be the work of his follower Hermann Wynrich von Wesel. The hypothesis that the anonymous Master of St Veronica, the artist of this painting, is to be identified with Wilhem of Herle found broad acceptance until 1895

Wilhelm of Herle (born in Herle in Dutch Limburg at an unknown date in the fourteenth century; time and place of death unknown) was a painter.

According to the statements of deeds of that period he was active in Cologne from 1358 for some fifteen or twenty years. In 1370 he was paid for paintings that he had made for the liber juramentorum of the city. Also remains of frescoes from the town hall that are now preserved in the Wallraf-Richartz Museum can certainly be traced to him. It is generally supposed that a painter, Wilhelm of Cologne, mentioned in the Limburg Chronicle as "the best painter in German lands" is Wilhelm of Herle, and it has been customary to attribute to him some of the best work in painting of early Cologne, although there is no absolute proof in any one case.

His pupil and assistant was Wynrich of Wesel, and art historian Johann Matthias Firmenich-Richartz, in particular, has ascribed to Wynrich pictures attributed to Wilhelm, although Carl Aldenhoven and others have protested against this attribution. It is difficult to distinguish the work of Wilhelm from that of the school he founded. The most important paintings about which there is question are the Madonna with the Bean-Blossom and its variant the Madonna with the Pea-Blossom and the accompanying pictures on the wing-panels of St. Catherine and St. Elizabeth (Cologne and Nuremberg). Other paintings are the Christ on the Cross surrounded by a large number of saints (Cologne), and St. Veronica (Munich). Among the works of this school is also included the altar of St. Clare in the cathedral of Cologne, in which the Sacrifice of the Mass in the centre is surrounded by twelve scenes from the youth and Passion of Christ.
