= Henri Sarolea =

Dutch businessman (1844–1900)

- Born: 18 January 1844; Maastricht, Netherlands
- Died: 12 September 1900 (aged 56); Heerlen, Netherlands
- Occupation: Entrepreneur

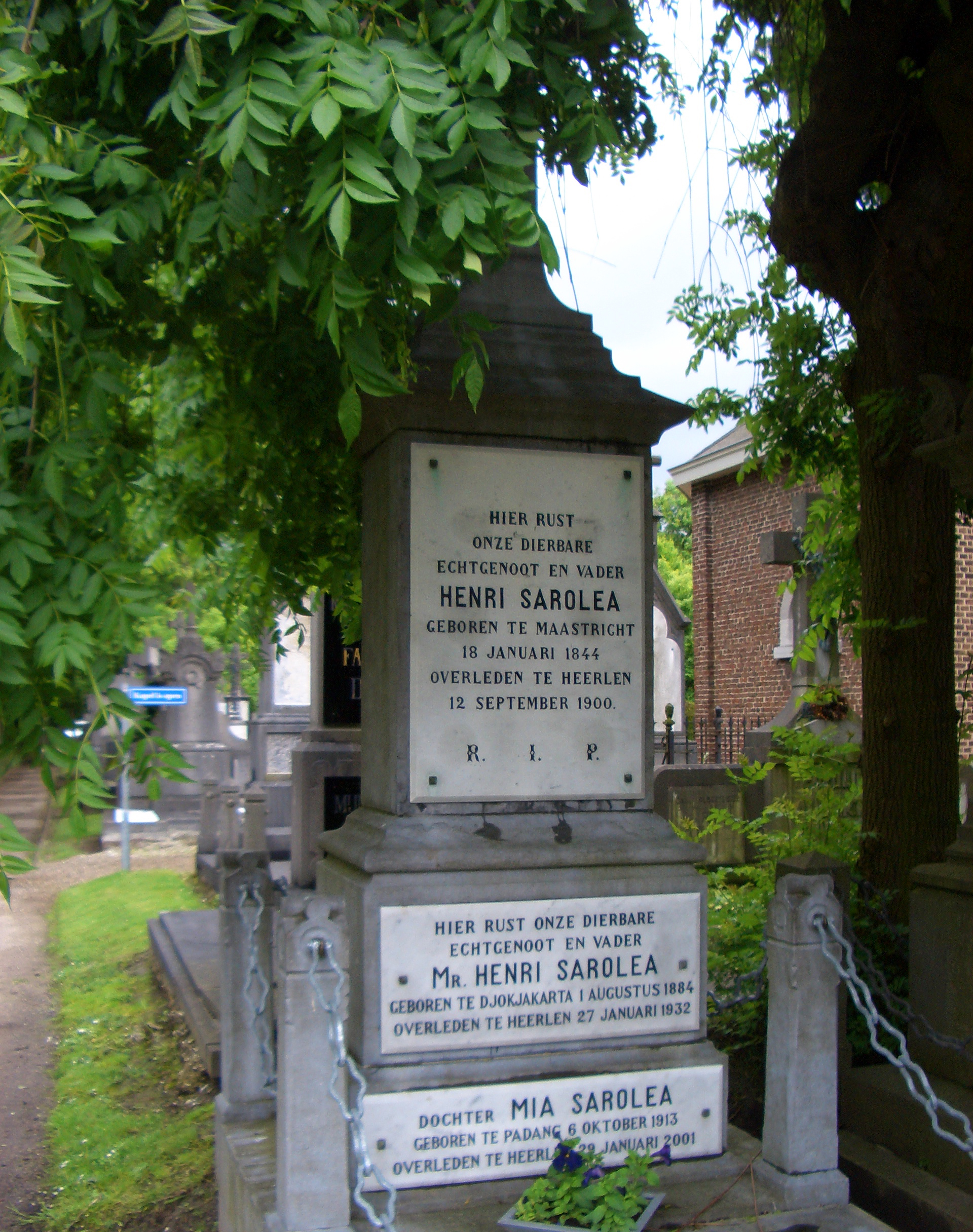
Grave of Henri Sarolea, and probably his son and granddaughter

Henri Sarolea (18 January 1844, Maastricht – 12 September 1900, Heerlen), was a Dutch railway entrepreneur and contractor who settled in Heerlen after having worked on the railways in the Dutch East Indies (now Indonesia).

His house in Heerlen was located close to where today there is a major railway crossing which did not exist when Henri moved there. Although the big towns surrounding Heerlen had railroad service (to places like Aachen, Liège, and Maastricht), Heerlen did not. At the age of 42 (1886) Henri started to plan a railroad between Herzogenrath, Heerlen, and Sittard. At first the Dutch government was skeptical about building a railroad in that far corner of the country, but Henri persevered and on 1 January 1896 the railroad was opened.

A few years earlier an industrial and mining family from Aachen, the Honingmann family bought a concession to mine for coal around Heerlen, but it proved to be impossible to ship the coal over the small roads around Heerlen. When they found out that Henri Sarolea was planning to build a railroad the brothers Friedrich (1841-1913) and Carl Honingmann (1842-1903) realised that it was time exploit the rich coal veins of Heerlen.

The first mine was dug right next to the railway. Henri, convinced that the mines would change Heerlen for good, even became a member of the board of directors of the Oranje Nassau Mijnen, the public name of the company. Unfortunately he did not see how his railroad changed Heerlen, he died of a heart attack in 1900 at the age of 56.

== Trivia ==
One of the most important shopping streets in Heerlen was renamed after Henri Sarolea. The Saroleastraat (Sarolea Street) runs from the train station into the heart of Heerlen's shopping neighbourhood.

== Sources ==
Translated from the Dutch Wiki, which used:

- Gemeentearchief Heerlen
- De Oranje-Nassau-mijnen op www.ta.tudelft.nl
