= Lambert Verdonk =

Dutch footballer

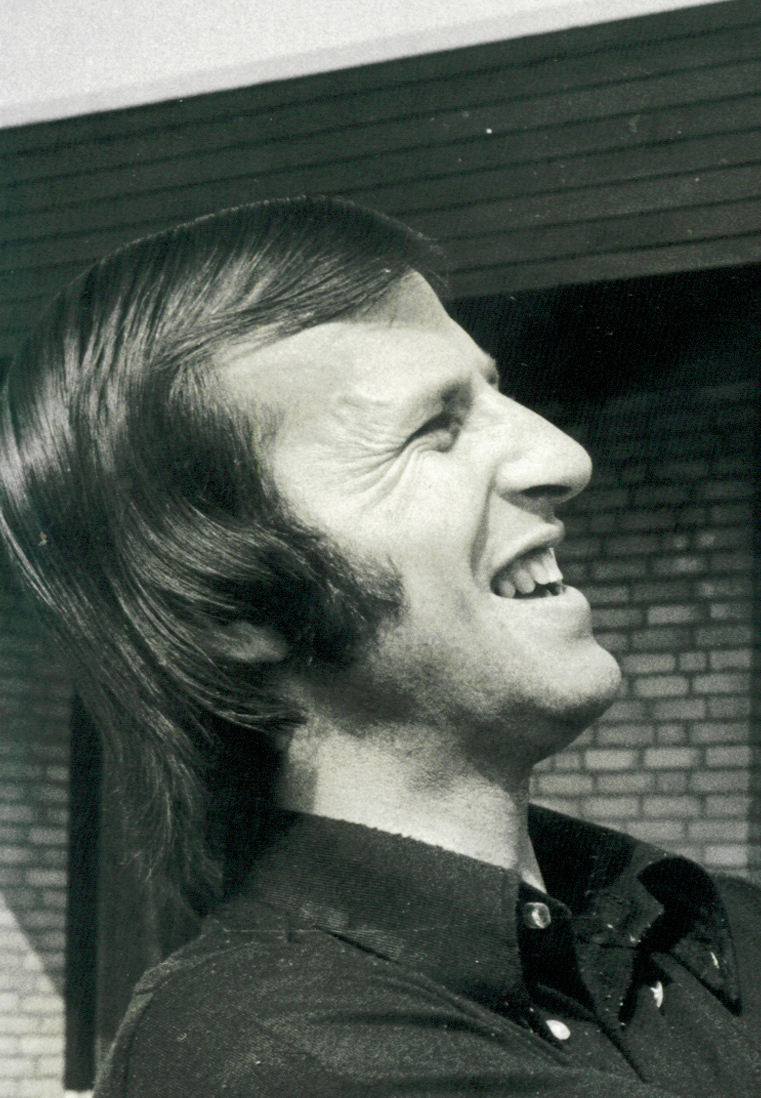
- Verdonk in 1974

Personal information
- Date of birth: September 20, 1944 (age 82)
- Place of birth: Hoensbroek, Netherlands
- Position: Striker

Senior career*
Years	Team	Apps	(Gls)
1963–1967	PSV Eindhoven	94	(15)
1967–1968	Sparta Rotterdam	32	(7)
1968–1970	NEC Nijmegen	55	(9)
1970–1971	Go Ahead Eagles	28	(3)
1972	Marseille	8	(3)
1972–1973	Ajaccio	32	(4)
1973–1974	Angoulême	27	(3)

International career
1964	Netherlands	4	(0)
- * Club domestic league appearances and goals

Lambert Verdonk (born September 20, 1944) is a Dutch former professional footballer who played as a striker. He made four appearances for the Netherlands national team.

== Honours ==
Marseille

- Division 1: 1971–72
- Coupe de France: 1971–72
