= Christian Quix =

Roman Catholic priest and historian

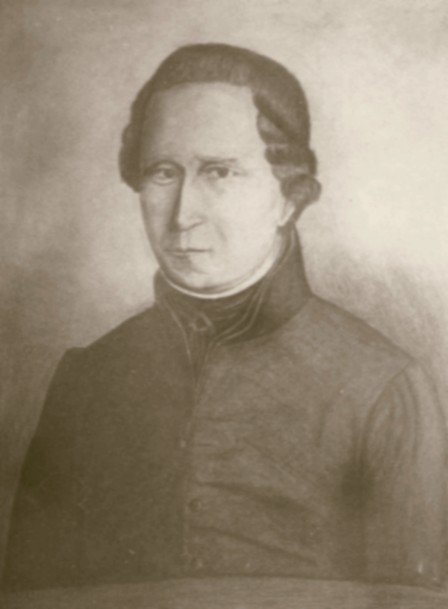
Christian Quix

Christian Quix (8 October 1773, Hoensbroek – 13 January 1844, Aachen) was a Roman Catholic priest, heimatforscher (local historian) and from 1833 the director of the Stadtbibliothek Aachen, the city library of Aachen.

== Life ==
The son of a typical tenant farming family from the Dutch province of Limburg, after his abitur he pursued a theological career. He entered the Carmelite order in 1792 and was ordained priest in 1795. However, the abolition of the monasteries in the French department of Roer cut his employment prospects and he left the order to work as a private tutor. From 1806 until early retirement due to deafness in 1823 he was appointed to what is now the Kaiser-Karls-Gymnasium in Aachen, teaching ancient languages, history and natural history and developing his own knowledge of these topics. After 1823 he devoted himself to research on local history, gathering documents and archival materials from various monasteries and offices, evaluating them and writing works on them.

== Partial bibliography ==
- History of the city of Aachen
- The Counts of Hengebach, the castles and towns of Heimbach and Niedeggen, the former monasteries of Marienwald and Bürvenich and the Collegial Abbey
- Contributions to a historical-topographical description of the former Duchy of Jülich
- The Parish of the Holy Cross and the former canon of the Knights of the Cross in Aachen 1829
