= Oranje Nassau III =

Coal mine in Heerlerheide, Heerlen, Limburg, Netherlands

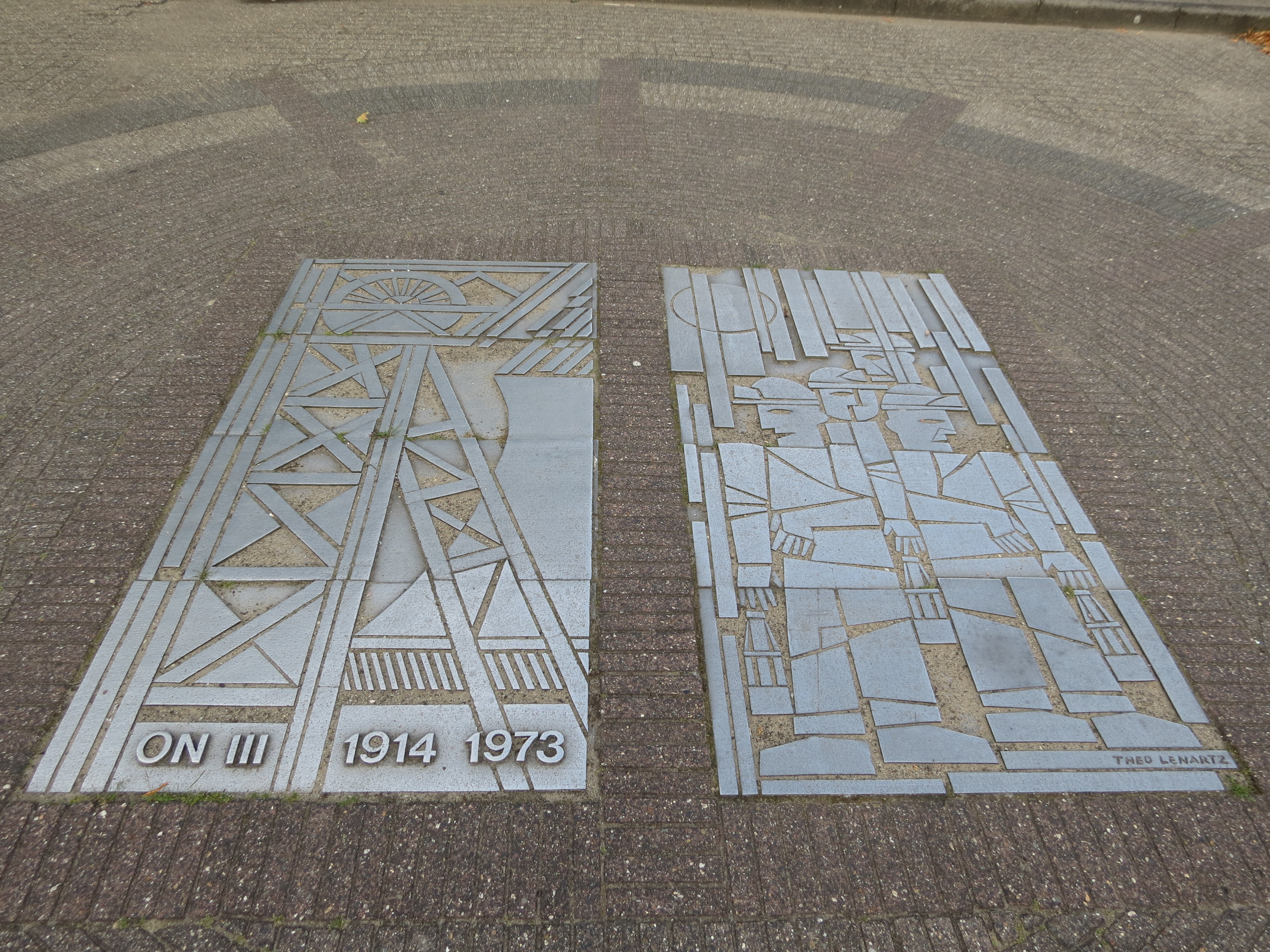
- Mine shaft cover (2012)

- Location within Netherlands
- Location: Heerlerheide, Heerlen, Limburg, Netherlands; 50°55′19″N 5°57′44″E
- Products: Coal
- Production: 38,265,000 tonnes
- Opened: 1914
- Closed: 1973
- Company: Oranje Nassau Mijnen

The Oranje Nassau III was a Dutch coal mine located in Heerlen. The mine was in operation from 1914 until 1973. It was the third of four mines collectively known as the Oranje Nassau Mijnen.
