= Pancratiuskerk =

Coordinates: 50.8878°N 5.9801°E

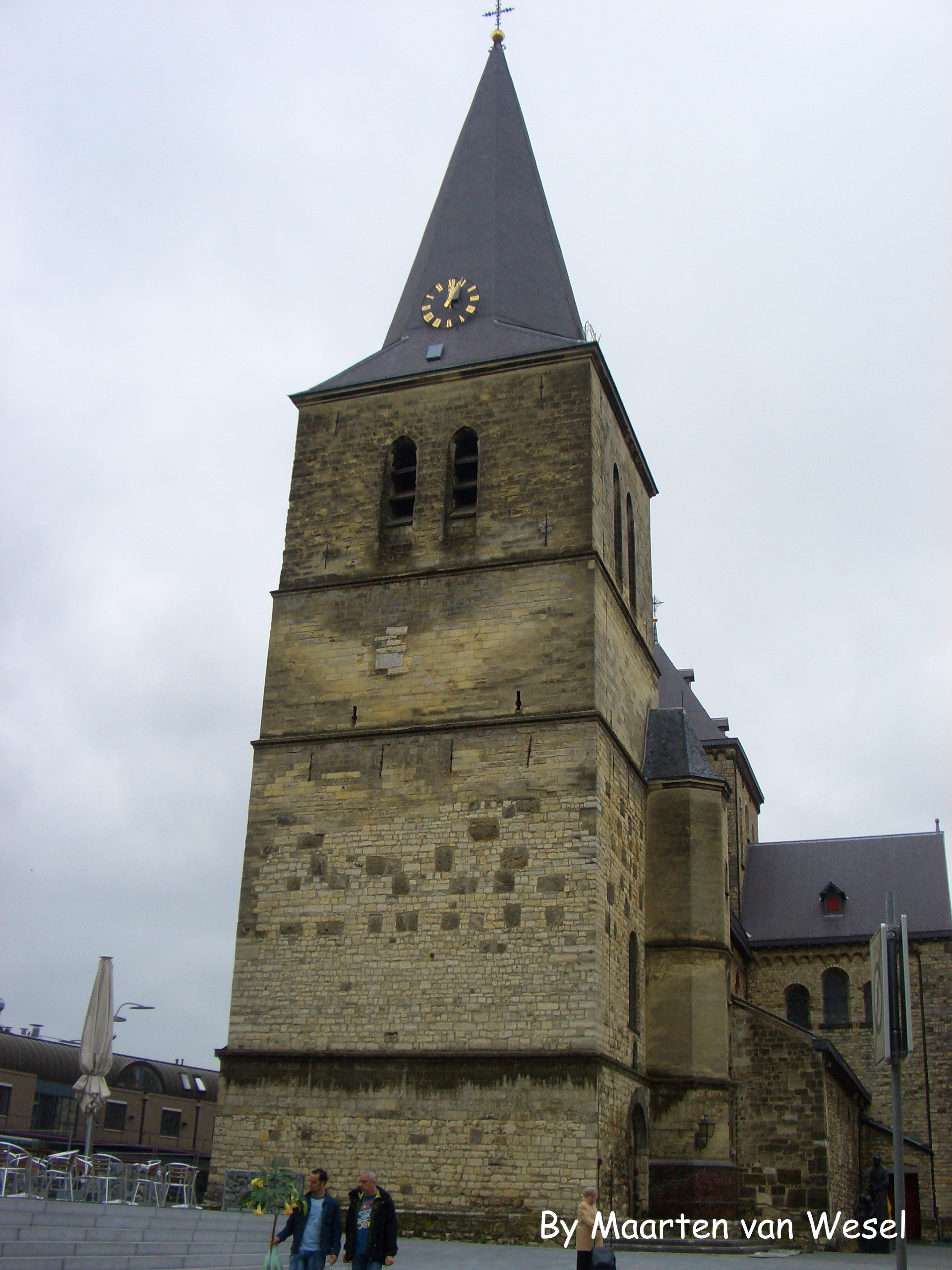
Bell Tower of the Pancratiuskerk

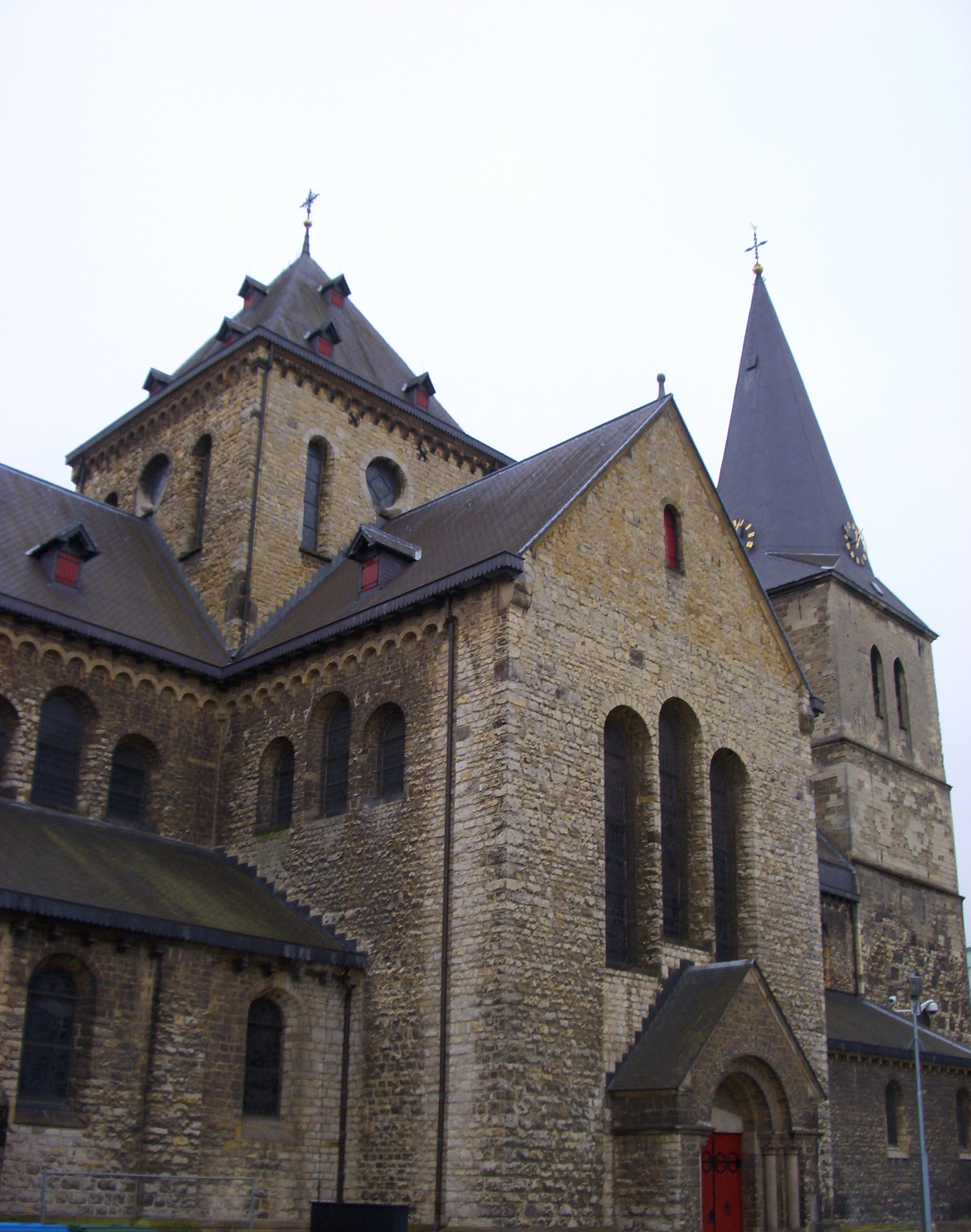
North side of the Pancratiuskerk

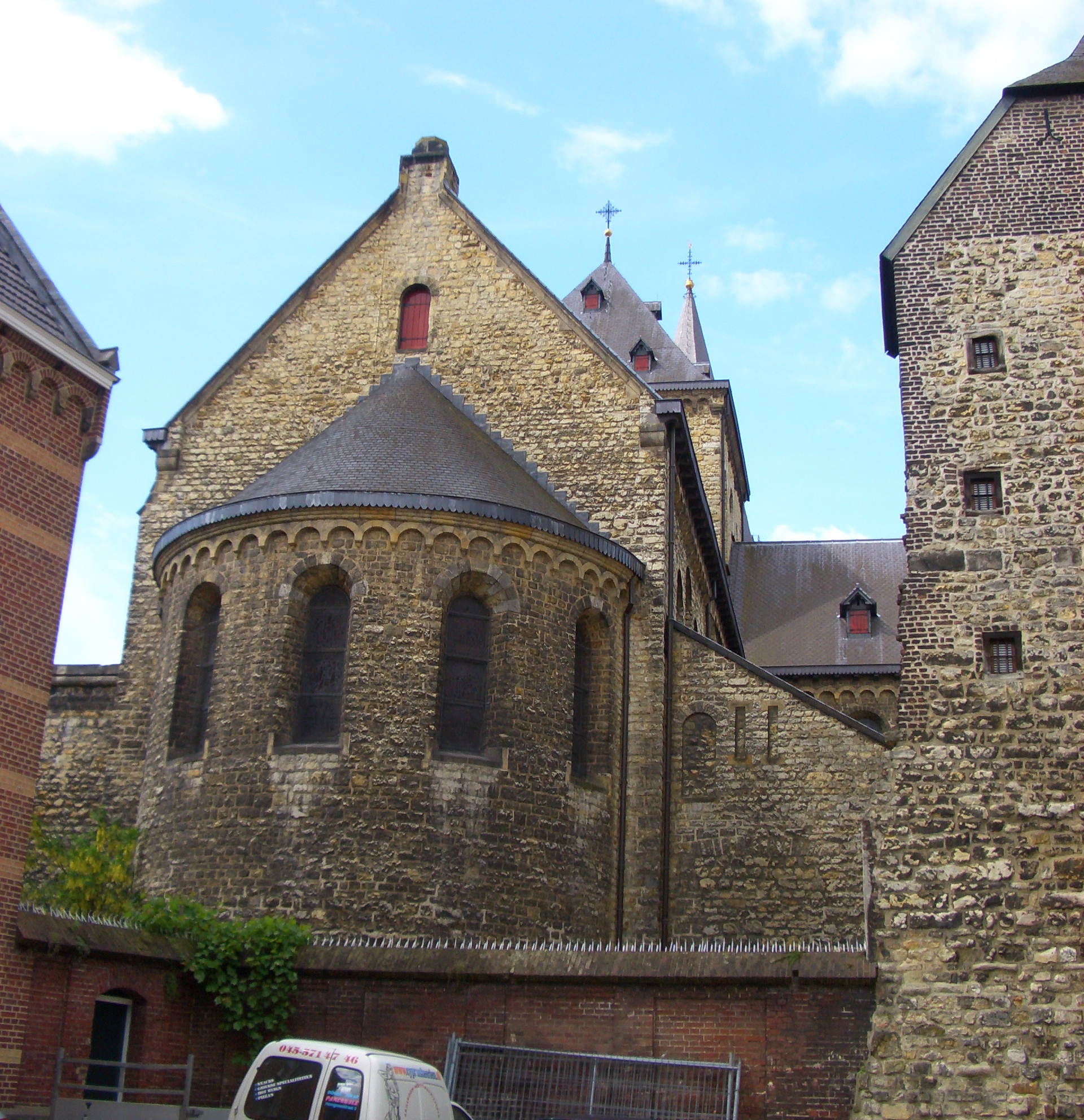
Back of the Pancratiuskerk; the right of the picture shows part of the Schelmentoren

The Pancratiuskerk (St. Pancras Church) is a Roman Catholic church in Heerlen in the Netherlands.

== History ==
Although no written sources about the origin of the church are known, a comparative study (including among others Onze-Lieve-Vrouwebasiliek in Maastricht) concludes that building started in the first half of the 12th century. However, since this study the age of both Onze-Lieve-Vrouwebasiliek and the church of Rolduc have been pushed back two centuries. It is suggested that the building of the Pancratiuskerk also started earlier, the 11th and possibly 10th century are most likely.

It is believed that the building was commissioned by the counts of Ahr-Hochstaden in the Rhineland, then the lords of Heerlen.

The current bell tower was built in 1394, and for the size of the church at that time was of a relatively heavy construction. The tower served as part of the defense mechanism for the Landsfort Herle.

From 1632 till 1836 the Pancratiuskerk served as a shared church for both Catholics and Protestants. The Protestants obtained their own church in 1836 and the arrangement ended.

A stair tower, located on the south side of the bell tower was built in 1862.

Between 1901 and 1903 Joseph Cuypers renovated and enlarged the church. The choir was demolished and replaced by a new eastern part, with a transept, crossing tower and a new choir, all in neo-romanesque style and using marl stone.

Frits Peutz, best known for the Glaspaleis located on the same square, supervised the repair of war damage between 1945 and 1948.

In 1960 a sacristy and a baptistry were built on the south side.

The current interior is a mixture of an interior created by Pierre Cuypers in 1880 and a modernisation of 1969. Frescoes created by Charles Eyck decorate parts of the ceiling.

The stained glass windows dating from between 1947 until the 1960s was created by Eugène Laudy and include Saint Nicholas, Saint Andrew, Saint Barbara, and Saint Servatius.

== Architectural features ==
The building is a triple-aisled cruciform basilica in a combination of Romanesque and Neoromanesque styles.

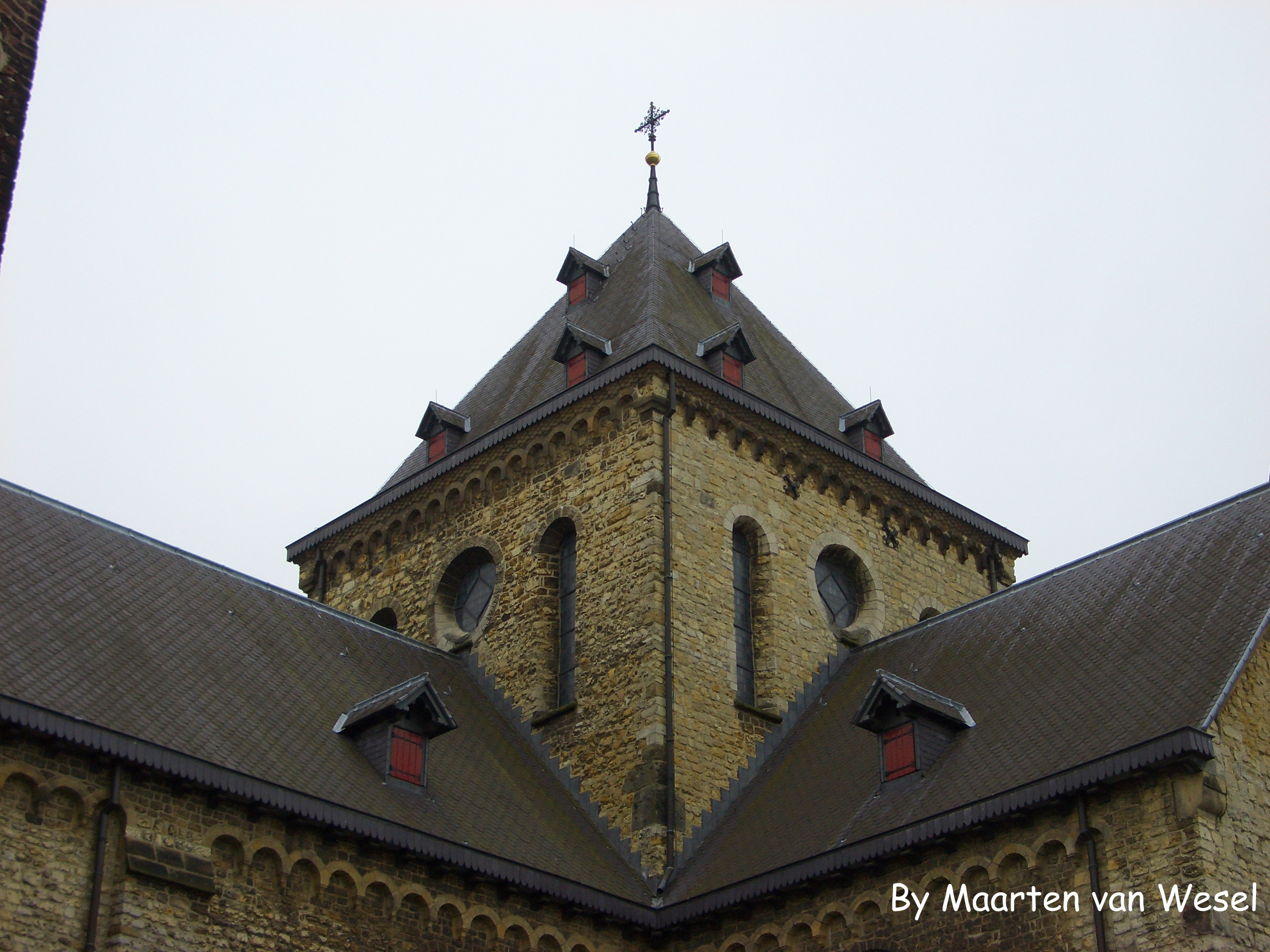
Roofdetail of the Pancratiuskerk

== See also ==
- Schelmentoren
