= Minewater Project =

The Minewater Project is an initiative of the municipality of Heerlen, the Netherlands, which uses abandoned coal mining fields as low-temperature energy resources.

== History ==
In the early 2000s, numerous research and commercial initiatives were undertaken in Europe to develop abandoned coal mining fields into low-temperature resources.

One of the most successful of these initiatives is the Minewater Project in Heerlen, where a low-temperature district heating system was launched in operation in October 2008. The project was carried out under the European Interreg IIIB NWE programme and the 6th Framework Program project EC-REMINING-lowex.

In 2014, the Minewater Project was being upgraded from a straightforward pilot system to a full-scale hybrid sustainable energy structure called Minewater 2.0.
