= Heerlen =

City and municipality in Limburg, Netherlands

Heerlen Heële
- City and municipality
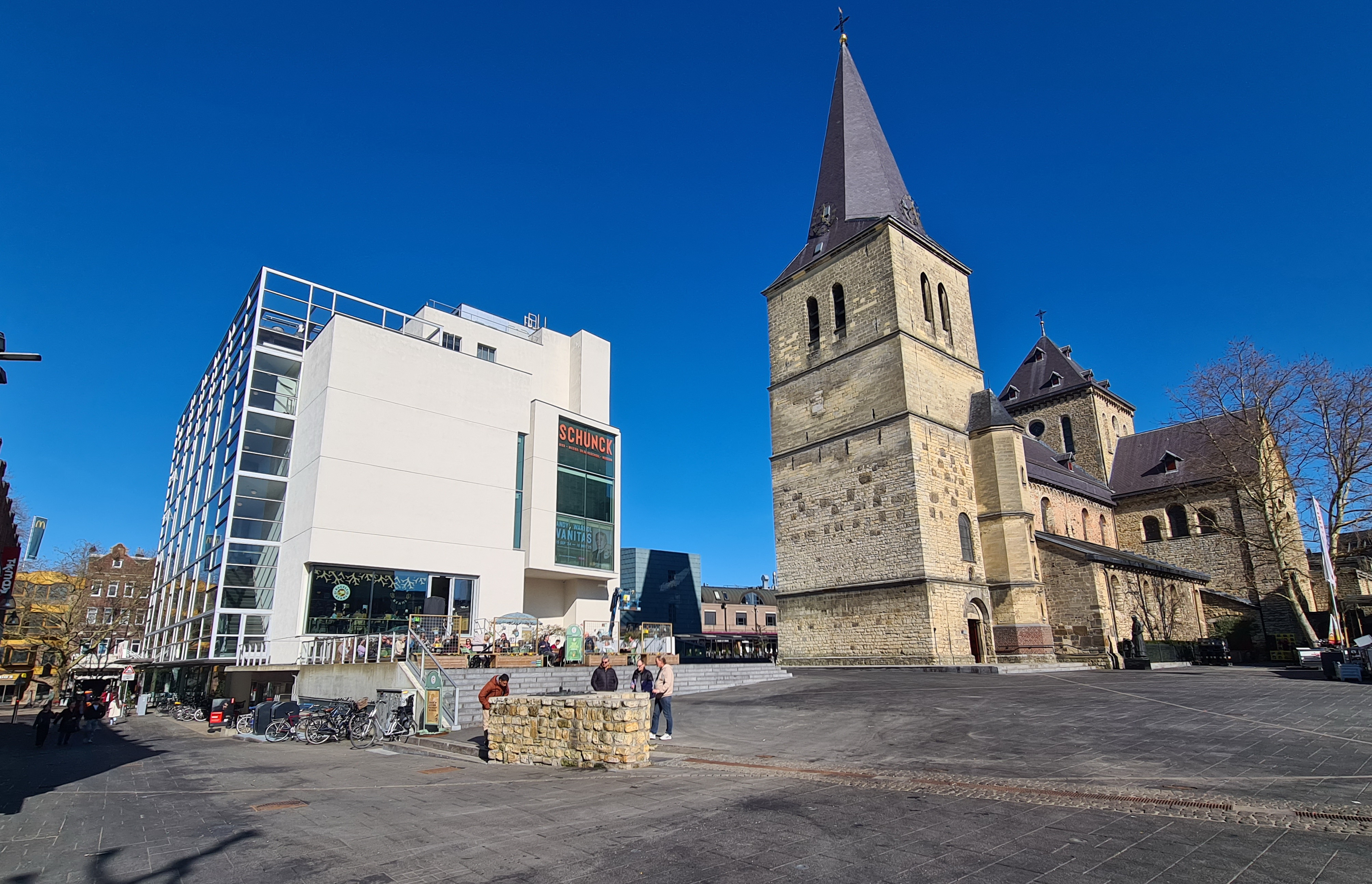
- Pancratiuskerk and Glaspaleis

- Flag Coat of arms

- Location in Limburg
- Coordinates: 50°53′N 5°59′E
- Country: Netherlands
- Province: Limburg

Government
  - Body: Municipal council
  - Acting Mayor: Roel Wever (VVD)

Area
  - Municipality: 45.53 km^{2} (17.58 sq mi)
  - Land: 44.94 km^{2} (17.35 sq mi)
  - Water: 0.59 km^{2} (0.23 sq mi)
- Elevation: 113 m (371 ft)

Population (Municipality, January 2021; Urban and Metro, May 2014)
  - Municipality: 86,874
  - Density: 1,934/km^{2} (5,010/sq mi)
  - Urban: 200,957
  - Metro: 247,731
- Demonym: Heerlenaar
- Time zone: UTC+1 (CET)
  - Summer (DST): UTC+2 (CEST)
- Postcode: 6400–6433
- Area code: 045
- Website: www.heerlen.nl

Heerlen (Dutch pronunciation: [ˈɦeːrlə(n)]; Limburgish: Heële [ˈɦeə˦lə]) is a city and a municipality in the southeast of the Netherlands. It is the third largest settlement proper in the province of Limburg. Measured as a municipality, it is the fourth largest municipality in the province of Limburg.

Heerlen forms part of the city-region of Parkstad Limburg, an agglomeration with about 250,000 inhabitants and encompassing eight municipalities. It is to the east of Maastricht and north of the German city of Aachen.

After its early Roman beginnings and a modest medieval period, Heerlen became a centre for the coal mining industry in the Netherlands in the late 19th century. In the 20th century, architect Frits Peutz played a major role in shaping the city as we know it today. His most famous design, and a distinctive building in the city centre, is the so-called Glaspaleis (Glass Palace), listed as one of the world's thousand most architecturally important buildings of the 20th century.

== History ==
A habitation from the Michelsberg culture (4400–3500 BC) was excavated at the Schelsberg, near Heerlen, in 1997. Archeological finds from this period are rare in the Netherlands, and this site is unique among those in the country, as it is the first excavated site with ditches and earth walls (earthworks).

Even with these proofs of early habitation, the history of Heerlen properly starts with the arrival of the Romans. They founded a military settlement, named Coriovallum on the crossroad of two main roads: Boulogne sur Mer – Cologne and Xanten – Aachen – Trier. In Heerlen and its surroundings, much evidence of Roman life has been excavated, especially Roman villas (country estates). The most notable archeological excavation from Roman times is the Thermae complex in the centre of Heerlen, a Roman bathhouse, discovered in 1940. In the Netherlands only a few of these have been found. It is a clear indication that Coriovallum/Heerlen was of some importance. A museum has been built over the Thermae and opened in 1977. The Thermenmuseum also houses other Roman finds from the area.

Like many other Roman settlements in the Netherlands, Coriovallum was probably abandoned after the 3rd/4th-century Roman retreat. Very little is known about Heerlen's history until the 10th century, when agricultural development continues once again in these parts of Europe. Farmhouses and mills are built across the valleys of Caumerbeek, Schandelerbeek and Geleenbeek and medieval Heerlen slowly takes shape.

The oldest mention of Heerlen (as 'Herle') is in an official document dated 1065. Udo, bishop of Toul, documents some gifts. One of them is the allodium Heerlen, in the bishopry of Liege. Another allodium consists of a few chapels, which belong to the mother church in Voerendaal, close to Heerlen. Shortly after this, the allodium of Heerlen appears to be owned by the counts of Ahr-Hochstaden.

Theoderich van Are (Udo van Toul's cousin) separated Heerlen from Voerendaal and chose Saint Pancratius as the patron saint of the church. The counts of Are where probably responsible for the construction of the Schelmentoren and the St. Pancratius church and also may have ordered the construction of a moated castle. Through these fortifications, Heerlen acquired some rights and freedoms, which gave it an elevated status over the surrounding countryside. Voerendaal, Hoensbroek, Schaesberg en Nieuwenhagen now fell under the legislation of the so-called "Land van Herle".

In 1244, Heerlen came under the authority of the dukes of Brabant, but in 1388, along with Hoensbroek, it was given a separate status. During the Eighty Years' War (1568–1648), Heerlen was disputed by the kingdom of Spain and the Dutch Protestant rebels and swapped sides several times. At the 1661 Partage Treaty, Heerlen became part of "Staat-Limburg", ruled by the States-General of the newly founded Dutch Republic. This resulted in it bordering the territory of the Spanish Netherlands, causing it to remain quite isolated from the rest of the state until 1793, when the French conquered Heerlen. After the defeat of Napoleon in 1814, it became part of the Netherlands province of Limburg (present-day Dutch and Belgian Limburg). In 1830, like most of Limburg, Heerlen sided with Belgium in the Belgian Revolution. In 1839, however, as a result of an agreement between the main European powers, it became part of the Netherlands again.

In the 19th century, Heerlen, like most of Limburg municipalities (Maastricht was an exception), did not partake in the Industrial Revolution and it remained largely agrarian until coal mining began in the late 19th / early 20th century. In March 1874, coal had been found at the Valkenburgerweg. However, setting up a mine was a risky long-term investment and only very few private enterprises took up the challenge and bought a concession. In 1896, Heerlen got its first railway connection to allow the transportation of coal from these first coal mines. Development was still rather slow: in 1812 Heerlen had a population of 3,497; in 1900 this was still only 6,646. In 1901, the national government stepped in and bought all remaining unsold concessions and set up the State Mines. In a short period of time several large state-operated coalmines began production. The population rose sharply from 6,646 in 1900 to 12,098 in 1910 to 32,263 in 1930. During these early expansion years many old buildings in the centre of Heerlen were demolished. The coalmines remained central to the development of Heerlen into a modern city until the early 1960s, during which Marcel van Grunsven ended his service as mayor of Heerlen.

The golden years of coal mining ended in the late 1950s, after which production gradually diminished due to competition from cheaper Polish and American coal and the discovery of natural gas in the province of Groningen. In the period 1965–1975 the coal mines were closed altogether. In the area around Heerlen-Kerkrade-Brunssum and Sittard-Geleen 60,000 people lost their jobs. A difficult period of economic re-adjustment started. The Dutch government tried to ease the pain by moving several governmental offices (ABP, CBS) to Heerlen but even today the city has not fully recovered from the loss of tens of thousands of jobs.

In the cityscape of modern-day Heerlen, there are very few reminders of the once omni-present mining industry. Most of the typical mounts of mining debris that surrounded the coal mines have been removed or transformed into green hills during an operation called van zwart naar groen (from black to green). Even the tallest mine chimney of Europe, 'Lange Lies' (tall Liz) and her older brother 'Lange Jan' (tall John), once major landmarks, were demolished. One of the few remaining mining buildings (shaft 2 of the Oranje Nassau I) now houses the Dutch Mine Museum.

== Geography ==
Heerlen is located at 50°53′N 5°59′E in the province of Limburg in the southeast of the Netherlands on the border with Germany. It is situated in the COROP region of South Limburg and is part of the agglomeration Parkstad Limburg, formerly known as Oostelijke Mijnstreek.

Heerlen is bordered by the Dutch municipalities of Simpelveld (in the south), Voerendaal and Nuth (west), Schinnen (northwest), Brunssum (north), Landgraaf and Kerkrade (east), and the German municipality of Aachen (southeast).

Heerlen's high elevation makes it one of the highest cities above sea level in the Netherlands.

== Economy ==
Heerlen houses the biggest furniture strip of Europe, with 120,000 m^{2} floorspace after the opening of the biggest (35,000 m^{2}) IKEA of the Benelux on 27 August 2008.

On 1 October 2008, the world's first minewater power station was opened in Heerlen. It will be used to heat and cool 200 homes, along with shops, a supermarket, a library and large office buildings.

=== Mines ===
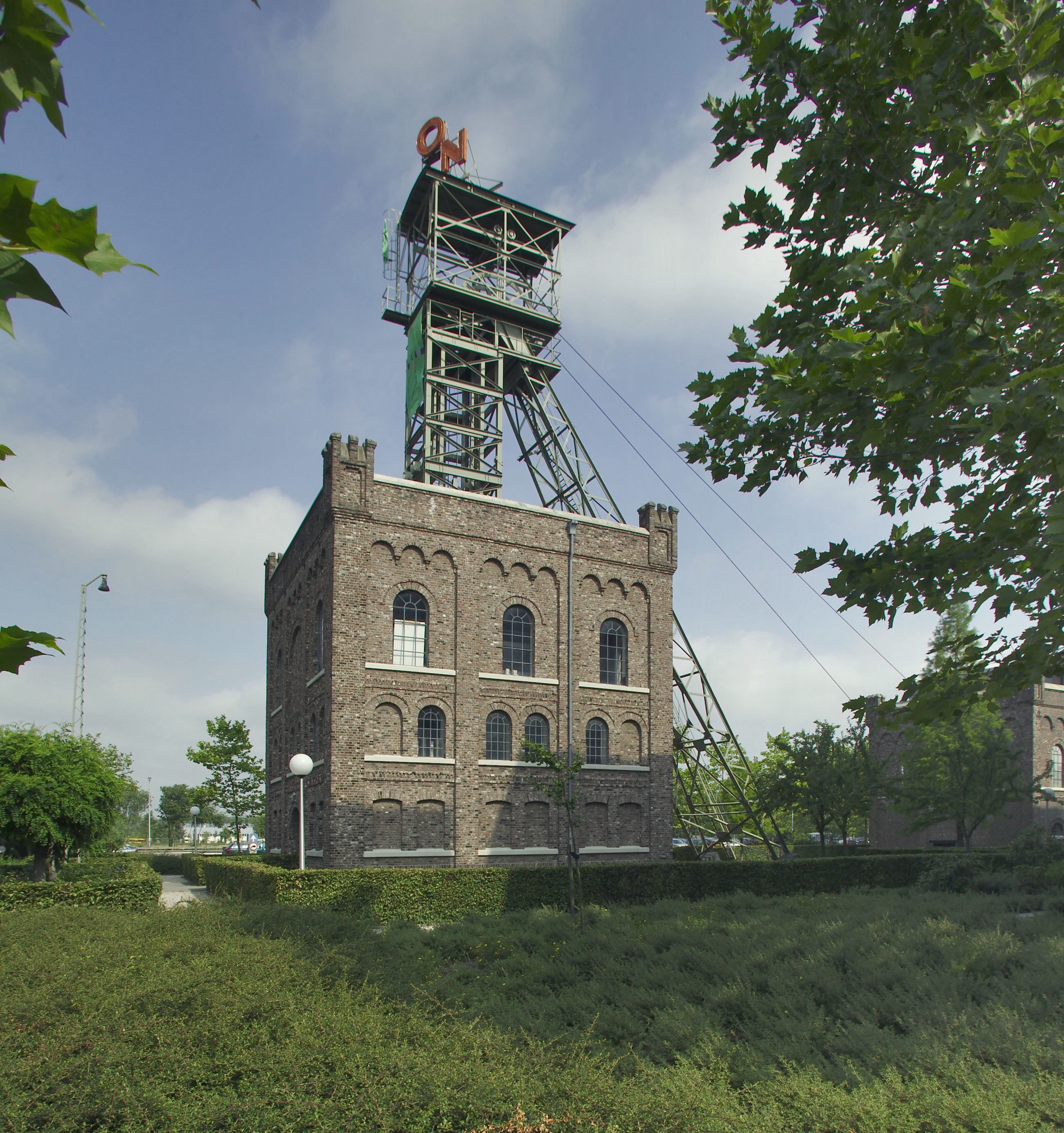
Oranje Nassau mine 1

List of mines which were located in what is now Heerlen:

- Oranje Nassau I, 1899–1974, now used in the Minewater Project
- Oranje Nassau III, 1917–1973, now used in the Minewater Project
- Oranje Nassau IV, 1927–1966
- Staatsmijn Emma, 1911–1973

== Education ==
Among the educational institutes in Heerlen is Zuyd Hogeschool, which is a University of Applied Sciences with branches in Heerlen, Sittard and Maastricht. Also based in Heerlen is the administrative office of the Open University of the Netherlands (Open Universiteit or OU in Dutch), which is a university for distance learning with tens of thousands of students throughout the Netherlands. Heerlen was also the location of the now-defunct University of Theology and Pastorate (Universiteit van Theologie en Pastoraat or UTP in Dutch), which had to close down due to lack of students. Jokingly it was said that Heerlen was the location of the biggest (OU) and the smallest (UTP) university of the Netherlands.

== Health care ==
Health care in Heerlen (and the rest of the Parkstad Limburg) is provided by Stichting Gezondheidszorg Oostelijk Zuid-Limburg (G.O.Z.L.). Zuyderland Medisch Centrum Parkstad (Zuyderland Medical Center Parkstad), is the name of the different hospitals in the Parkstad, and is part of G.O.Z.L. Until 2015 these hospitals were called Atrium Medisch Centrum Parkstad. Zuyderland location Heerlen was previously known as De Wever ziekenhuis named after Frans de Wever, who in 1904, together with Mgr. Joseph Savelberg, founded the first hospital in Heerlen (at its foundation in 1904 called Maria Hilfspital, and after a few years renamed St. Joseph hospital until the De Wever was opened in 1968).

== Architecture ==
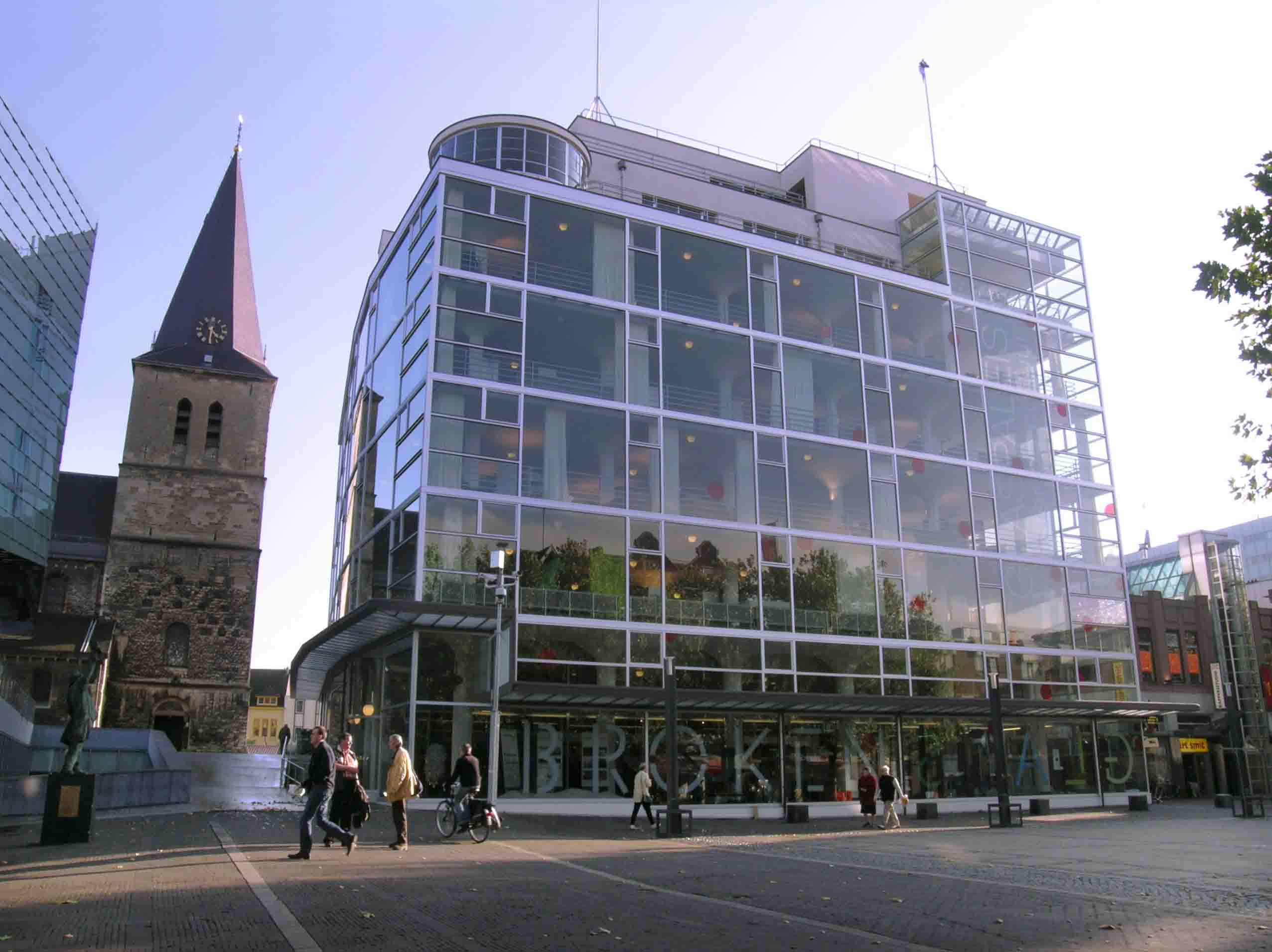
Glaspaleis

The city's best-known architect is Frits Peutz. His legacy consists of at least 10 landmark buildings in Heerlen. In 1935 Heerlen's most famous landmark building, the Glaspaleis, was built next to the medieval church in the centre of the then modest town. It was commissioned by the merchant Peter Schunck and it was quite an extraordinary step for this conservative businessman to ask the young Heerlen-based architect Peutz to design the new Schunck department store. It is one of the most outstanding examples of early Modernism in The Netherlands but it was only recognized as such at a fairly late stage (after it had been badly maimed). In the 1990s it was added to a prestigious list of the world's 1000 most important buildings of the 20th century created by the International Union of Architects (only 13 buildings in the Netherlands are on that list). It encouraged the city administrators to buy the dilapidated building and make plans for its renovation. The renovation has now been completed and it now houses several of the city's cultural institutions, including a museum of modern art. The renovated Glaspaleis has become a symbol of the revived Heerlen after the closing of the coalmines.

Although many interesting buildings were demolished around 1900, some older buildings still exist in the centre of Heerlen, for instance, a Romanesque style 12th-century church (Pancratiuskerk), and a former prison tower from around the same period (Schelmentoren).

Other buildings worth mentioning are a Neoclassical chapel (Grafkapel de Loë built in 1848, the only remaining Neoclassical building in Heerlen), and a former mansion annex pharmacy, left in almost the same state as after its 1801–1828 expansion (Huis de Luijff).

In other parts of Heerlen, especially near the numerous small rivers around Heerlen, many older buildings can be found, noticeably a couple of watermills (like the Weltermolen (14th century), Eikendermolen (15th century), Oliemolen (16th century), and Schandelermolen (17th century)), some castles (for instance Hoensbroek Castle oldest part 1380, Kasteel Terworm 15th century) and old farms (Geleenhof (dating back to Roman days), Benzeraderhof (13th century), Hoeve Den Driesch (14th century), Overste Douvenrade (largely destroyed and rebuilt in 1779) and Hoeve de Bek (1796)).

=== Architects with significant work ===
Here follows a list of architects who have built important landmarks in Heerlen, and those landmarks.

- A van Beers: Huize Op de Berg (1897)
- Johan Kayser (1842, Harlingen – 1917): Chapel Savelberg Convent (1878–1879, style: Neo-Gothic)
- Jan Stuyt (1868–1934): Ambachtsschool (1913, style: Hollands Classicisme)
- J. Pauw: Former library (1917, style: Amsterdam School)
- Dirk Roosenburg (1887–1962): Former office Oranje Nassau mine (1928, style: International style)
- Dirk Brouwer (1899–1941): Former HEMA building (1939, style: International style)
- Frits Peutz (1896–1974): Glaspaleis (1933, style: International style), Monseigneur Schrijnen Retreat House (1932), townhall (1940), municipal theatre
- Gerrit Rietveld (1888 Utrecht – Utrecht 26 June 1964): house on Zandweg (1961–1964)
- Jo Coenen (born 1949 in Heerlen-Hoensbroek): Library and entrance Stadsgalerij (1983, 1989)

== Transport ==
Heerlen has three railway stations:

- Heerlen
- Heerlen Woonboulevard
- Hoensbroek

From Heerlen one can travel to Eindhoven, Utrecht, Amsterdam, Maastricht/Liège, Kerkrade and towards Aachen/Köln in Germany.

== Sports ==
The GP Heerlen is a February cyclo-cross race held in Heerlen.

== People from Heerlen ==
A chronological list of notable Heerlenaren (inhabitants of Heerlen):

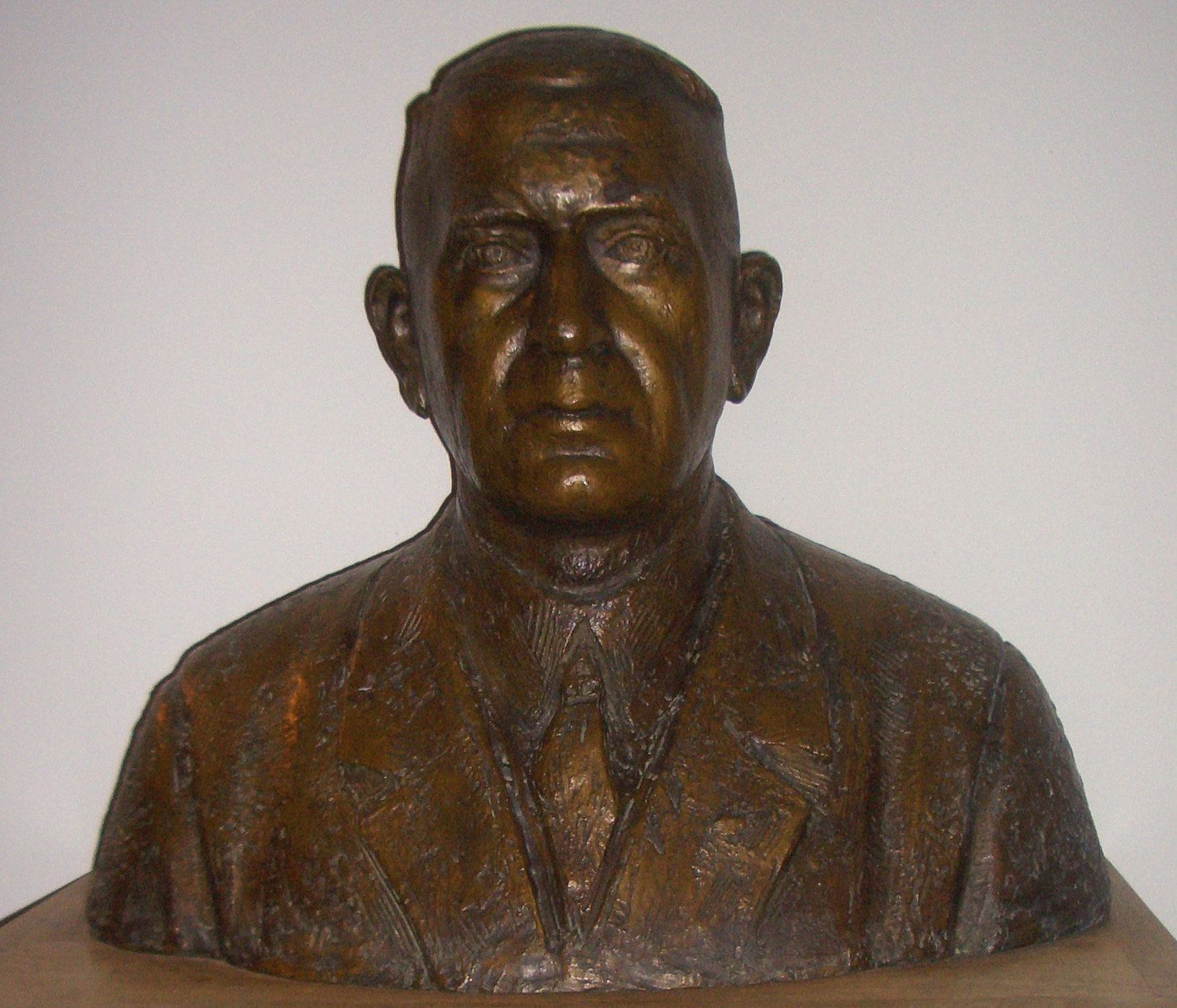
Bust of Frans de Wever, 2011

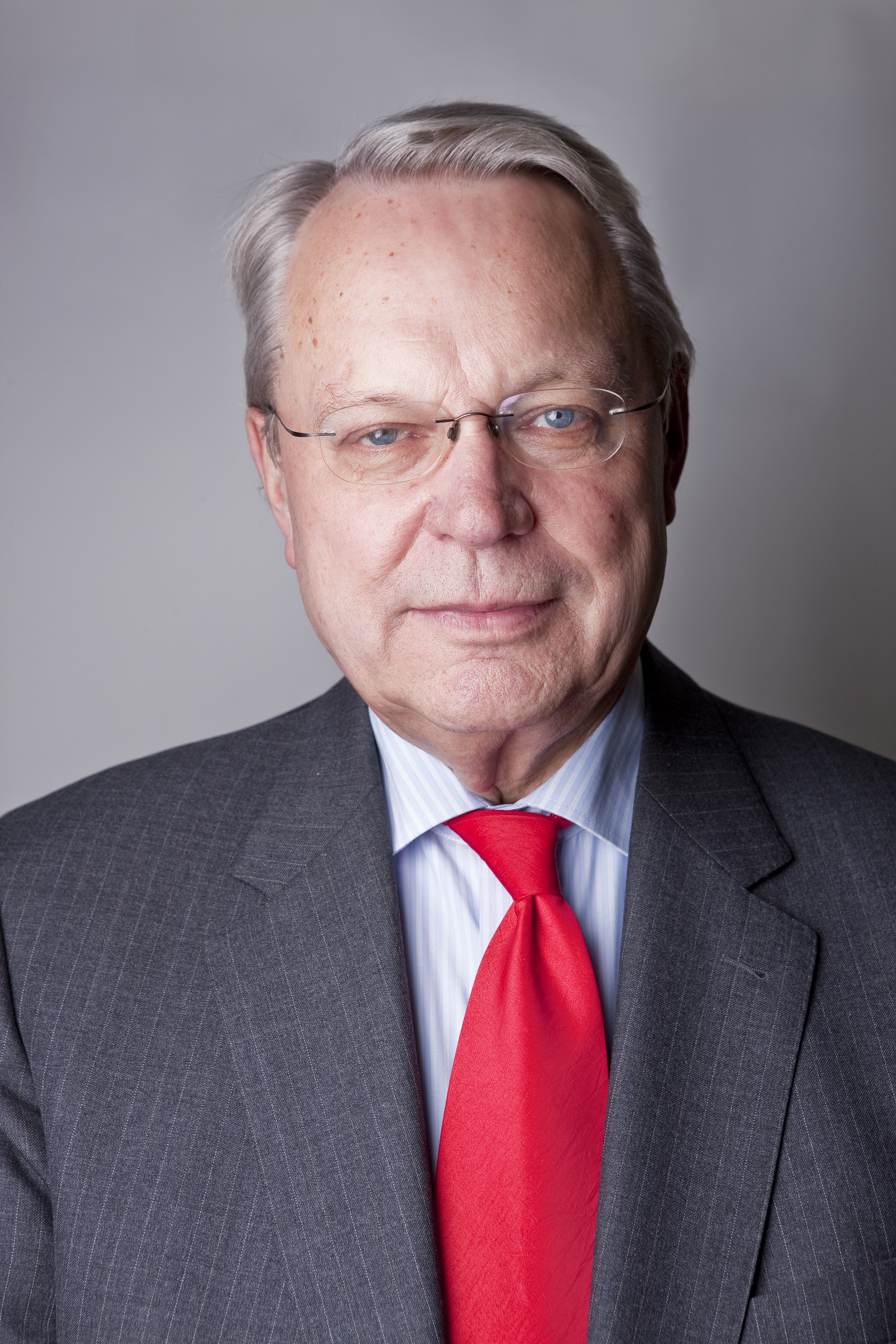
Klaas de Vries, 2008

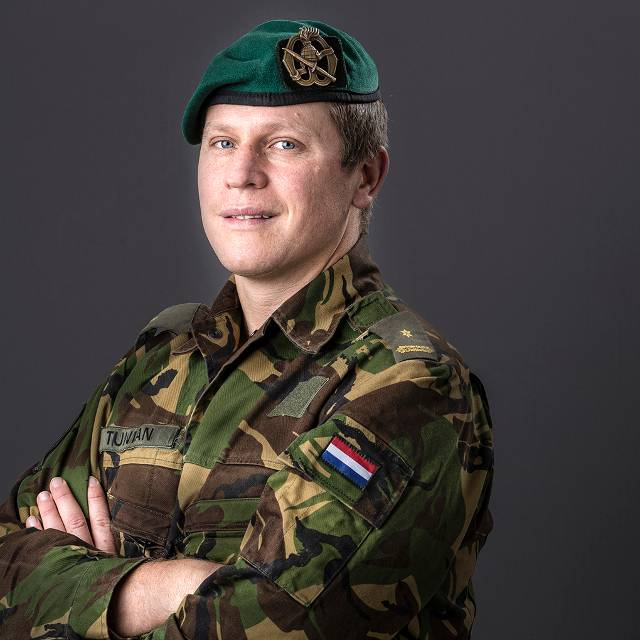
Gijs Tuinman, 2014

=== Public service & business ===
- M. Sattonius Iucundus (third century), Roman politician
- Theoderich van Are (1087–1126), the first count of Are (Germany)
- Jacob Derk Carel van Heeckeren (1730–1795), a politician from a Dutch noble family
- Christian Quix (1773–1844), a Roman Catholic priest and director of the Aachen city library
- Jan Gerard Kemmerling (1776–1818), Mayor of Heerlen
- Egidius Slanghen (1820–1882), politician and historian
- Joseph Savelberg (1827–1907), Roman Catholic priest
- Henri Sarolea (1844–1900), a railway entrepreneur and contractor
- Frans de Wever (1869–1940), general practitioner
- Frederik van Iterson (1877–1957), a mechanical engineering professor, developed the power station natural draught cooling tower
- Marcel van Grunsven (1896–1969), Mayor of Heerlen from 1926 to 1961
- Maximilian von Fürstenberg (1904–1988), a cardinal of the Roman Catholic Church
- Pierre Schunck (1906–1993), family owned Schunck department store and worked in the Dutch resistance
- Theo Bemelmans (born 1943), a computer scientist and academic
- Klaas de Vries (born 1943), a retired politician and jurist
- Maud de Boer-Buquicchio (born 1944), a jurist and United Nations special rapporteur
- Jo Ritzen (born 1945), a retired politician economist
- Jo Coenen (born 1949), a architect and urban planner
- Loek Hermans (born 1951), a retired politician and businessman
- Wiel Arets (born 1955), an architect and industrial designer
- Ellen 't Hoen (born 1960), an international medical activist and academic
- Frans Timmermans (born 1961), politician, Vice-President of the European Commission
- Jeanine Hennis-Plasschaert (born 1973), a politician, Minister of Defence 2012–2017
- Gijs Tuinman (born 1979) Royal Netherlands Army officer, recipient of the Military Order of William

=== Arts ===
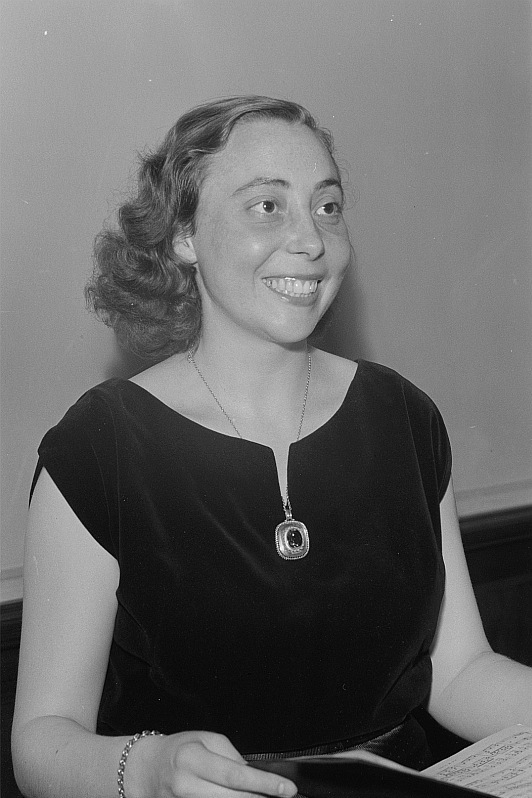
Agnes Giebel, 1953

- Wilhelm of Herle (fl. 1350–1370), painter.
- Jan Michiel Dautzenberg (1808–1869), Belgian writer
- L. O. Wenckebach (1895–1962), a sculptor, painter and medallist
- Agnes Giebel (1921–2017), a German classical soprano
- Thomas Bernhard (1931–1989), an Austrian playwright and novelist
- Harrie Geelen (born 1939–2025), an illustrator, film director, animator and poet
- Margriet Ehlen (born 1943), a poet, composer and conductor
- Hein van der Heijden (born 1958), a stage, TV and film actor
- L.A. Raeven, twins and arts duo
- Tamara Hoekwater (born 1972), a pop singer
- Dennis "Seregor" Droomers (born 1980), singer and guitarist of symphonic black metal band Carach Angren
- Simone Simons (born 1985), singer of Dutch symphonic metal band Epica

=== Sports ===
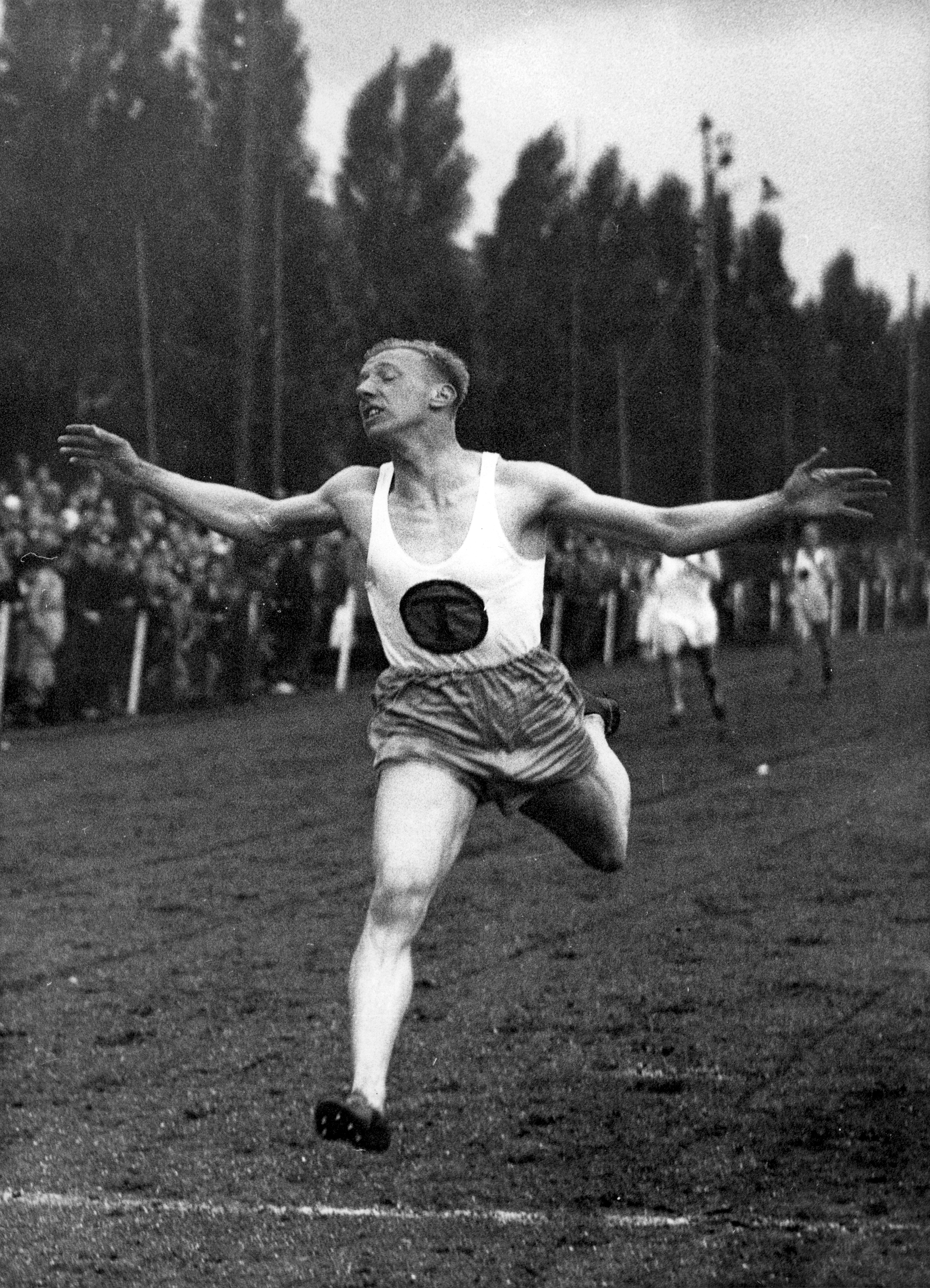
Tinus Osendarp, 1936

- Tinus Osendarp (1916–2002), a Dutch sprinter, twice bronze medallist at the 1936 Summer Olympics
- René Hofman (born 1961), a retired footballer with 400 club caps
- Guido Görtzen (born 1970), a volleyball player, team gold medallist in the 1996 Summer Olympics
- Ger Senden (born 1971), a retired footballer, played 411 games with Roda JC
- Fernando Ricksen (1976–2019), a professional footballer with 452 club caps
- Eugène Martineau (born 1980), a decathlete
- Shirley Kocaçınar (born 1986), a Dutch Turkish-Dutch football forward
- Danny Hoesen (born 1991), a footballer for Ajax
- Jessica Blaszka (born 1992), a wrestler
- Jules Szymkowiak (born 1995), a racing driver
- Issam El Maach (born 2001), a Moroccan-Dutch football goalkeeper
