= Frits (given name) =

Frits is a masculine given name and also a diminutive form (hypocorism) of Frederik (or Frederick, Fredericus, Frederikus). Quite common in the Netherlands, it also occurs in Denmark and Norway. It may refer to:

- Frits Agterberg (born 1936), Dutch-born Canadian geologist
- Frederik Frits Korthals Altes (1931–2025), Dutch politician and former Minister of Justice
- Frits Bernard (1920–2006), Dutch clinical psychologist and sexologist
- Frits Beukers (born 1953), Dutch mathematician
- Frits van Bindsbergen (born 1960), Dutch road cyclist
- Frits Bolkestein (1933–2025), Dutch politician
- Frits Bülow (1872–1955), Danish politician and Justice Minister
- Frits Castricum (1947–2011), Dutch journalist and Labour Party politician
- Frits Clausen (1893–1947), Danish collaborator with Nazi Germany
- Frits Dantuma (born 1992), Dutch footballer
- Frits van Dongen (born 1946), Dutch architect
- Frits Dragstra (1927–2015), Dutch politician
- Frits Eijken (1893–1978), Dutch rower
- Frits Fentener van Vlissingen (1882–1962), Dutch businessman and entrepreneur
- Frits Goedgedrag (born 1951), first Governor of Curaçao and former Governor of the Netherlands Antilles
- Frits Goldschmeding (born 1933), Dutch businessman
- Frits Hansen (1841–1911), Norwegian educator, newspaper editor, biographer and politician
- Frits Hartvigson (1841–1919), Danish pianist and teacher
- Frits Heide (1883–1957), Danish botanist and science writer
- Frits Helmuth (1931–2004), Danish film actor
- Frits Henningsen (1889–1965), Danish furniture designer and cabinet maker
- Frederik David Holleman (1887–1958), Dutch and South African ethnologist and jurist
- Frits Holm (1881–1930), Danish scholar and adventurer
- Frits Hoogerheide (1944–2014), Dutch racing cyclist
- Frits Janssens (1898–?), Belgian wrestler who competed in the 1920, 1924 and 1928 Olympics
- Frits Kemp (born 1954) is a Dutch attorney, receiver and activist
- Frits Kiggen (born 1955), Dutch sidecarcross passenger
- Frits Korthals Altes (born 1931), Dutch Minister of Justice
- Frederik Kortlandt (born 1946), Dutch linguistics professor
- Frits Kuipers (1899–1943), Dutch footballer, rower and physician
- Frederik Lamp (1905–1945), Dutch sprinter
- Frits Landesbergen (born 1961), Dutch jazz drummer and vibraphonist
- Frits von der Lippe (1901–1988), Norwegian journalist and theatre director
- Frits Lugt (1884–1970), Dutch collector of Dutch drawings and prints and authority on Rembrandt
- Frits Meuring 1882–1973), Dutch swimmer
- Frits Mulder, Belgian sailor at the 1928 Summer Olympics
- Frederik Muller (1817–1881), Dutch bibliographer, book seller, and print collector
- Frits Niessen (1936–2020), Dutch politician
- Frits van Oostrom (born 1953), Dutch historic philologist
- Frits van Paasschen (born 1961), Dutch and American chief executive
- Frits Pannekoek (born 1947), Canadian historian and university dean
- Frits Peutz (1896–1974), Dutch architect
- Frits Philips (1905–2005), Dutch chairman of Philips electronics and Righteous Among the Nations
- Frits Pirard (born 1954), Dutch retired professional road bicycle racer
- Frits Poelman (born ca. 1930), Dutch-born New Zealand footballer
- Frits Potgieter (born 1974), South African retired discus thrower and shot putter
- Frits Purperhart (1944–2016), Surinamese football player and manager
- Frits de Ruijter (1917–2012), Dutch middle-distance runner
- Frits Ruimschotel (1922–1987), Dutch water polo player
- Frits Schalij (born 1957), Dutch retired speed skater
- Frits Schlegel (1896–1965), Danish architect
- Frederik Carl Gram Schrøder (1866–1936), Danish civil servant
- Frits Schuitema (born 1944), Dutch chief executive and football director
- Frits Schutte (1897–1986), Dutch swimmer
- Frits Schür (born 1954), Dutch retired cyclist
- Frits Sins (born 1964), Dutch slalom canoer
- Frits Smol (1924–2006), Dutch water polo player
- Frits Soetekouw (1938–2019), Dutch footballer
- Frits Staal (1930–2012), Dutch Indologist
- Frits Tellegen (1919–2020), Dutch urban designer
- Frits Thaulow (1847–1906), Norwegian Impressionist painter
- Frits Thors (1909–2014), Dutch journalist and news anchor
- Frits van Turenhout (1913–2004), Dutch sports journalist
- Frits Van den Berghe (1883–1939), Belgian expressionist and surrealist painter and illustrator
- Frits Vanen (born 1933), Dutch painter and sculptor
- Frederik Vermehren (1823–1910), Danish genre and a portrait painter
- Frits Went (1863–1935), Dutch botanist, father of Frits Warmolt Went
- Frits Warmolt Went (1903–1990), Dutch biologist and botanist
- Frits Zernike (1888–1966), Dutch physicist and Nobel Prize winner

== See also ==
- Fritz, another given name
