= List of cinemas in the Netherlands =

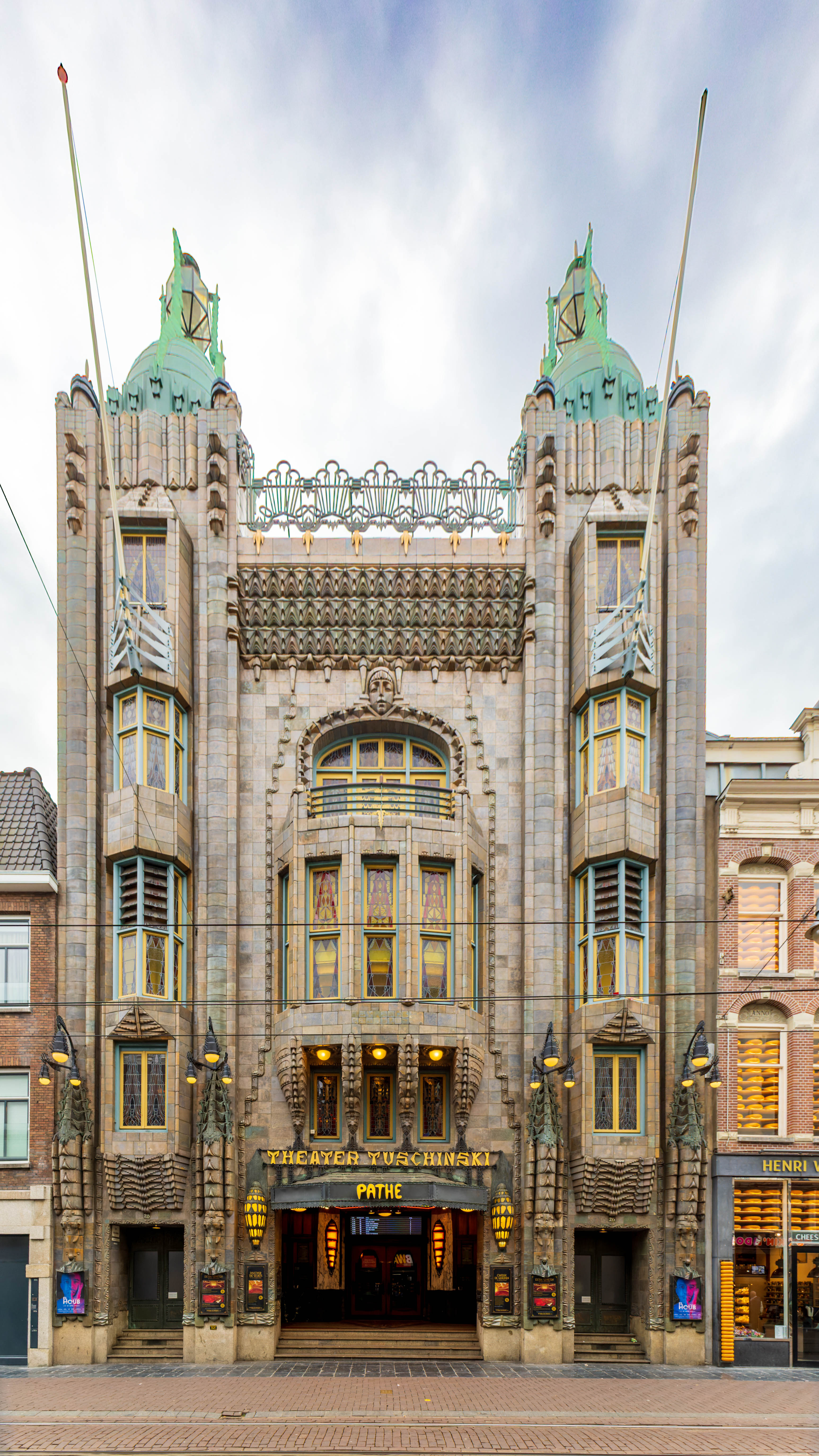
Theater Tuschinski in Amsterdam

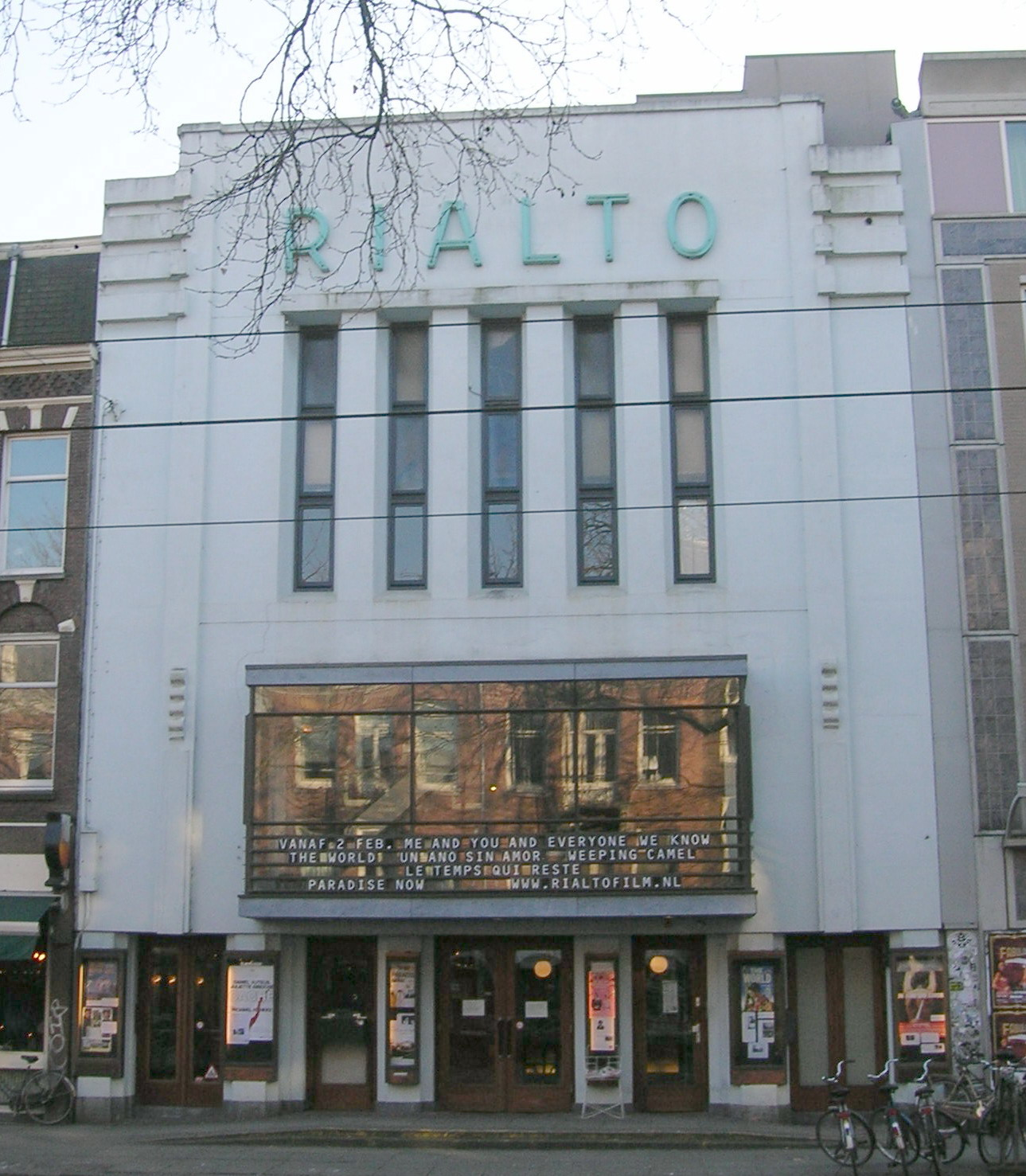
Rialto in Amsterdam

There are over a hundred cinemas in the Netherlands, in addition to 79 small arthouse cinemas and a number of adult movie theaters. The main cinema chains in the Netherlands are Pathé, Vue and Kinepolis.

== Pathé ==
Pathé Theatres B.V. is part of the Pathé Cinémas chain, which in turn is part of Pathé. Pathé Theatres B.V. operates the following cinemas (most multiplex) in the Netherlands:

- Pathé Amersfoort in Amersfoort (8 screens)
- Pathé Arena in Amsterdam (14 screens)
- Pathé City in Amsterdam (7 screens)
- Pathé de Munt in Amsterdam (13 screens)
- Pathé Tuschinski in Amsterdam (6 screens)
- Pathé Rembrandt Arnhem in Arnhem (5 screens)
- Pathé Breda in Breda (7 screens)
- Pathé Delft in Delft (7 screens)
- Pathé Buitenhof in The Hague (6 screens)
- Pathé Scheveningen in The Hague (8 screens)
- Pathé Spuimarkt in The Hague (9 screens)
- Pathé Eindhoven in Eindhoven (8 screens)
- Pathé Groningen in Groningen (9 screens)
- Pathé Haarlem in Haarlem (8 screens)
- Pathé Helmond in Helmond (5 screens)
- Pathé Maastricht in Maastricht (6 screens)
- Pathé de Kuip in Rotterdam (14 screens)
- Pathé Schouwburgplein in Rotterdam (7 screens)
- Pathé Tilburg in Tilburg (7 screens)
- Pathé Rembrandt Utrecht in Utrecht (3 screens)
- Pathé Zaandam in Zaandam (6 screens)
- Pathé De Kroon in Zwolle (4 screens)

The largest theaters are Pathé de Munt in the center of Amsterdam (13 screens), Pathé Arena in Amsterdam-Zuidoost (14 screens), and Pathé de Kuip in Rotterdam (14 screens). A Wolff theater with 18 screens will arise in Utrecht, at the Jaarbeurs-side (westside) of Utrecht Centraal railway station. Using Wolff's definition of a megaplex theater, one having 16 or more screens, it will be the first one in the Netherlands.

Pathé sells the Pathé Unlimited Card (PUC) for unlimited entrance to regular showings at all its Dutch theaters for €21 per month (or €29,50 per month including 3D, 4DX, Dolby Cinema and IMAX). The Cineville Pass allows unlimited entrance to regular and most of the special showings at about 40 independent movie theaters in the Netherlands, in Alkmaar, Amersfoort, Amsterdam, Arnhem, Castricum, Den Haag, Deventer, Dordrecht, Groningen, Haarlem, Hilversum, Leiden, Maastricht, Nijmegen, Rotterdam, Schiedam, Utrecht, Wageningen and Zwolle for €22,50 per month (and a discounted rate of €18,50 for those under 30) . Some Pathé theaters and independent cinema's offer live broadcasting of operas and some concerts. Admission prices are two or three times the regular ones.

== IMAX ==
There are ten IMAX cinemas in the Netherlands, six of which belong to Pathé.

- Museon-Omniversum (formerly known as Omniversum), The Hague - IMAX Dome
- Pathé Arena, Amsterdam - IMAX Laser 3D
- Pathé Eindhoven, Eindhoven - IMAX Laser 3D
- Pathé Schouwburgplein, Rotterdam - IMAX Laser 3D
- Pathé Spuimarkt, The Hague - IMAX Laser 3D
- Pathe Leidsche Rijn, Utrecht - IMAX Laser 3D
- Pathé Tilburg, Tilburg - IMAX Laser 3D
- Pathé Arnhem, Arnhem - IMAX Laser 3D
- Kinepolis Almere, Almere - IMAX Laser
- Kinepolis Breda, Breda - IMAX Laser
- Kinepolis Enschede, Enschede - IMAX Laser

== List of cinemas ==
Town	Municipality	Province	Theaters with number of screens
's-Hertogenbosch	's-Hertogenbosch	North Brabant	
Alblasserdam	Alblasserdam	South Holland	
Alkmaar	Alkmaar	North Holland	
Almere	Almere	Flevoland	
Alphen aan den Rijn	Alphen aan den Rijn	South Holland	
Amersfoort	Amersfoort	Utrecht	
Amstelveen	Amstelveen	North Holland	
Amsterdam	Amsterdam	North Holland	De Balie 1, Cavia 1, Cinecenter 4, EYE 2, City 7, Filmhallen 9, Het Ketelhuis 3, Kriterion 3, Lab111, Melkweg 1, The Movies 4, Pathé ArenA 14, Pathé De Munt 13, Pathé Tuschinski 6, Rialto 3, Rialto VU, Studio K 2, Tropentheater 1, De Uitkijk 1
Apeldoorn	Apeldoorn	Gelderland	Vue Apeldoorn 7
Arnhem	Arnhem	Gelderland	Pathé Rembrandt Arnhem 5
Assen	Assen	Drenthe	
Bergen (NH)	Bergen (NH)	North Holland	
Bergen op Zoom	Bergen op Zoom	North Brabant	
Best	Best, North Brabant	North Brabant	
Beverwijk	Beverwijk	North Holland	Cineworld
Breda	Breda	North Brabant	Pathé Breda 7
Castricum	Castricum	North Holland	Corso
Delft	Delft	South Holland	Pathé Delft 7, Filmhuis Lumen
Den Burg	Texel	North Holland	
Den Helder	Den Helder	North Holland	
Deventer	Deventer	Overijssel	Luxor
Doetinchem	Doetinchem	Gelderland	Cinecity
Dordrecht	Dordrecht	South Holland	The Movies
Drachten	Smallingerland	Friesland	
Dronten	Dronten	Flevoland	
Echt	Echt-Susteren	Limburg	
Ede	Ede	Gelderland	
Eindhoven	Eindhoven	North Brabant	Pathé Eindhoven 8, JT Eindhoven 8, Natlab by Plaza Futura 6, Service Bioscoop Zien 5, De Zwarte Doos 1 (University Cinema)
Emmeloord	Noordoostpolder	Flevoland	
Emmen	Emmen	Drenthe	Utopolis 7
Enschede	Enschede	Overijssel	CineStar
Geertruidenberg	Geertruidenberg	North Brabant	
Geleen	Sittard-Geleen	Limburg	
Goes	Goes	Zeeland	
Gorinchem	Gorinchem	South Holland	
Gouda	Gouda	South Holland	
Groningen	Groningen (municipality)	Groningen	Megabioscoop MustSee Euroborg 10 (impressie mustsee), Images 3, Pathé 9
Haarlem	Haarlem	North Holland	Brinkmann 5, Filmschuur 2, Palace 1
Hardenberg	Hardenberg	Overijssel	
Harderwijk	Harderwijk	Gelderland	
Heerenveen	Heerenveen	Friesland	
Heerhugowaard	Heerhugowaard	North Holland	
Heerlen	Heerlen	Limburg	Royal Theater, Filmhuis De Spiegel, H5 theaters
Hellevoetsluis	Hellevoetsluis	South Holland	
Helmond	Helmond	North Brabant	Pathé Helmond 5
Hengelo	Hengelo	Overijssel	Cinema Hengelo, Filmhuis Hengelo
Hilversum	Hilversum	North Holland	
Hoofddorp	Haarlemmermeer	North Holland	
Hoogeveen	Hoogeveen	Drenthe	Luxor
Hoogezand-Sappemeer	Hoogezand-Sappemeer	Groningen	
Hoorn	Hoorn	North Holland	
Houten	Houten	Utrecht	
Huizen	Huizen	North Holland	
Hulst	Hulst	Zeeland	
Kampen	Kampen, Overijssel	Overijssel	
Klazienaveen	Emmen	Drenthe	
Leeuwarden	Leeuwarden	Friesland	
Leiden	Leiden	South Holland	Trianon, Lido/Studio, Kijkhuis
Lelystad	Lelystad	Flevoland	
Lisse	Lisse	South Holland	
Maastricht	Maastricht	Limburg	
Malden	Heumen	Gelderland	
Meppel	Meppel	Drenthe	Luxor
Middelburg	Middelburg	Zeeland	
Naaldwijk	Westland	South Holland	
Nieuwegein	Nieuwegein	Utrecht	
Nijmegen	Nijmegen	Gelderland	
Oostburg	Sluis	Zeeland	
Oosterhout	Oosterhout	North Brabant	
Oss	Oss	North Brabant	
Oudenbosch	Halderberge	North Brabant	
Panningen	Peel en Maas	Limburg	
Purmerend	Purmerend	North Holland	
Reuver	Beesel	Limburg	
Roermond	Roermond	Limburg	Foroxity 7
Roosendaal	Roosendaal	North Brabant	
Rotterdam	Rotterdam	South Holland	Cinerama 7, Kino, Lantaren/Venster 5, Pathé De Kuip 14, Pathé Schouwburgplein 7, WORM 1
Schagen	Schagen	North Holland	
Schiedam	Schiedam	South Holland	
Schijndel	Schijndel	North Brabant	
Sittard	Sittard-Geleen	Limburg	Foroxity 8
Sneek	Súdwest-Fryslân	Friesland	
Spijkenisse	Spijkenisse	South Holland	
Stadskanaal	Stadskanaal	Groningen	
Steenwijk	Steenwijkerland	Overijssel	
Terneuzen	Terneuzen	Zeeland	
The Hague	The Hague	South Holland	Filmhuis, Omniversum, Pathé Buitenhof 6, Pathé Scheveningen 8, Pathé Spuimarkt 9
Tiel	Tiel	Gelderland	
Tilburg	Tilburg	North Brabant	Pathé Tilburg 7
Uden	Uden	North Brabant	
Utrecht	Utrecht (municipality)	Utrecht	't Hoogt, Catharijne, Louis Hartlooper Complex, Pathé Rembrandt 3, City, CineMec Sterrenkijker
Veenendaal	Veenendaal	Utrecht	
Veldhoven	Veldhoven	North Brabant	
Venray	Venray	Limburg	
Vlissingen	Vlissingen	Zeeland	CineCity
Voorschoten	Voorschoten	South Holland	
Waalwijk	Waalwijk	North Brabant	
Wageningen	Wageningen	Gelderland	
Weert	Weert	Limburg	Gotcha! Cinema 5
Weesp	Weesp	North Holland	Filmhuis Weesp 1
Wijchen	Wijchen	Gelderland	Cinema Roma 3
Wijk bij Duurstede	Wijk bij Duurstede	Utrecht	Calypso Theater 1
Winschoten	Oldambt (municipality)	Groningen	Cultuurhuis de Klinker 1
Winterswijk	Winterswijk	Gelderland	Service Theater Skopein 3
Woerden	Woerden	Utrecht	AnnexCinema 4
Zaandam	Zaanstad	North Holland	Pathé Zaandam 6, Filmfabriek De Fabriek 2
Zaltbommel	Zaltbommel	Gelderland	Filmtheater Cinemaarten 1
Zandvoort	Zandvoort	North Holland	Cinema Circus 1
Zeist	Zeist	Utrecht	Figi 4
Zevenaar	Zevenaar	Gelderland	Movie Unlimited 3, Filmhuis Zevenaar 1
Zierikzee	Zierikzee	Sealand	Filmtheater Zierikzee 1
Zoetermeer	Zoetermeer	South Holland	Kinepolis Zoetermeer 8, Stadstheater Zoetermeer 1
Zutphen	Zutphen	Gelderland	Luxor Theater 1, Cinemajestic 4
Zwolle	Zwolle	Overijssel	Pathé Zwolle 9 (Dolby Atmos), Filmtheater Fraterhuis 2

== See also ==
- Cinema of the Netherlands
