= Vroom & Dreesman Building, Heerlen =

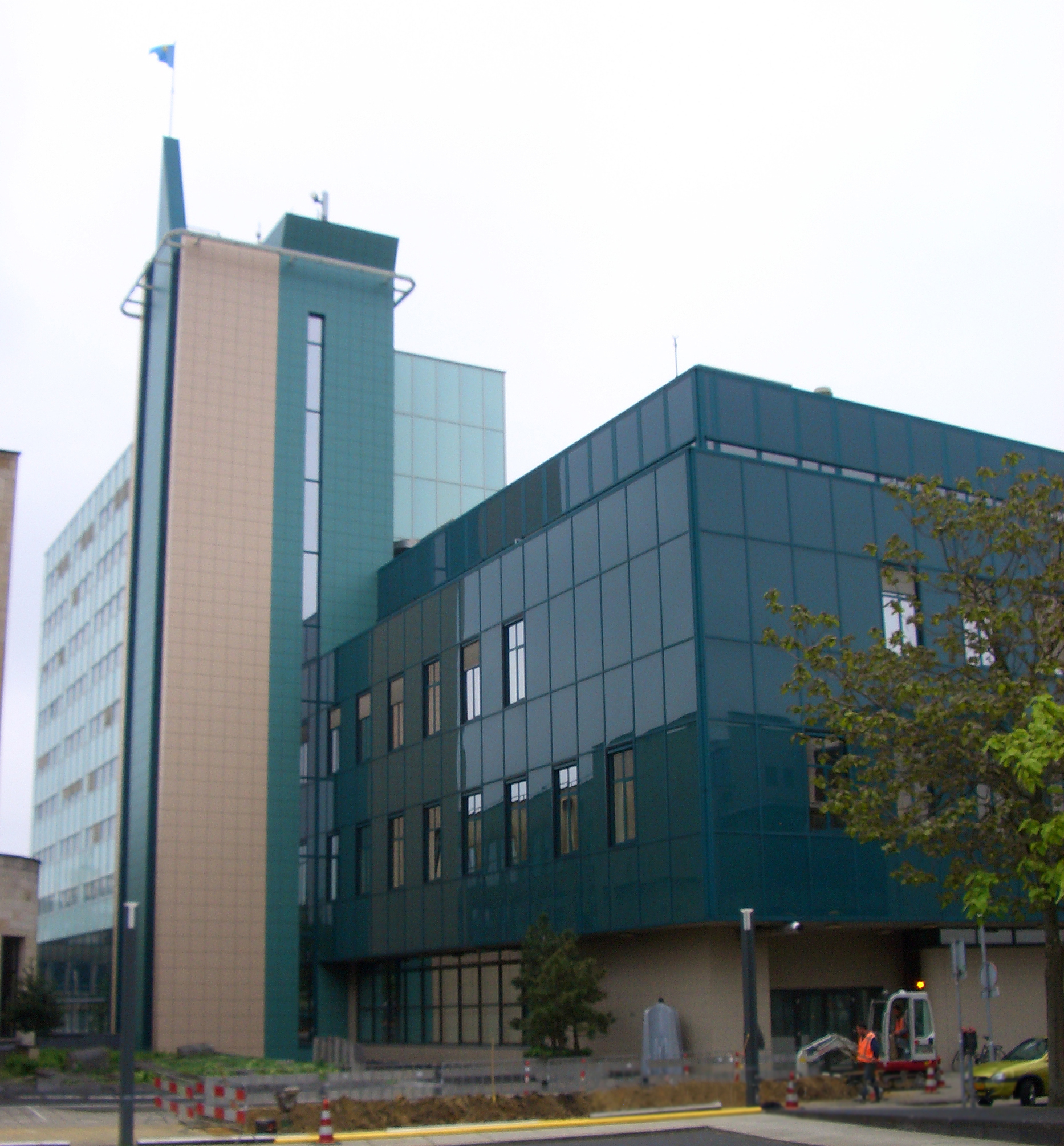
- The building in its much altered later appearance as a municipal office building. Foreground: former V&D department store. Background: former Hotel Europe

General information
- Architectural style: Modern Architecture
- Location: Heerlen, Netherlands
- Coordinates: 50.8867°N 5.9784°E
- Completed: 1958
- Demolished: 2019
- Client: Adrianus Merkx and Vroom & Dreesmann

Design and construction
- Architect: Frits Peutz
- Structural engineer: E. Joosten & L. Reumkens

The Vroom & Dreesmann Building in Heerlen was a former department store and a hotel, later an office building in Heerlen, the Netherlands, designed by Frits Peutz in 1958. The lower part of the building housed a department store of the Dutch chain Vroom & Dreesmann (V&D). The higher part was a hotel, Hotel Europe.

== History ==
Vroom & Dreesmann had been located in Heerlen since 1920. In the first half of the 20th century Heerlen developed from an insignificant rural town into the dynamic urban centre of the Dutch coalmining district. The architect Frits Peutz played an important role in this transformation with buildings like the Glaspaleis, the former offices of Oranje Nassaumijnen, the Monseigneur Schrijnen Retreat House and the Town Hall.

In the 1950s Heerlen had become a medium-size town. The director of the Heerlen Vroom & Dreesmann store, mr. Adrianus Merkx, decided that it was time for a new and much bigger department store. As with the Glaspaleis, which was also designed as a department store, the commission was given to Frits Peutz. The interior design was done by mr. Kober and his daughter Marcia. The builders were E. Joosten and L. Reumkens.

Former V&D building by night

The building consisted of two parts: a 10-storey hotel on the side of Geleenstraat, and a 4-storey department store facing Raadshuisplein. The Geleenstraat entrance was located 10 m lower than the entrance at Raadshuisplein (which is also the case for the adjacent Town Hall, also designed by Peutz).

The building included seven escalators, something unseen thusfar in Heerlen. 75,000 m of electric wiring were used, with 2000 sockets and a 100,000 watt spare power supply. Furthermore, there was a central telephone system with 380 connections, 120 cash registers, a pneumatic post system, three elevators for shoppers, two high speed elevators, and three goods elevators. There were loading and unloading docks for trucks and vans.

On the top floor was a tearoom and restaurant, called VenDorama. There were 30 dishwashers that could clean and dry up to 9200 dishes per hour,

In the early 1990s the building's facade was updated to a more contemporary design, which changed its appearance dramatically. After the renovation the building served as a municipal office building. It was demolished in 2019 to make room for a new municipal office building by Dutch architects Mecanoo which pays hommage to the adjacent Peutz town hall.
