= Schuitema =

Schuitema may refer to:

- Frits Schuitema (born 1944), Dutch former chairman of Philips
- Paul Schuitema (1897-1973), Dutch graphic artist
