= Buitenhof =

Buitenhof may refer to:

- Buitenhof (TV series), a Dutch Sunday morning political interview television programme
- Buitenhof (The Hague), a square in The Hague, Netherlands
- Pathé Buitenhof, a movie theater in the Netherlands
