= Monseigneur Schrijnen Retreat House =

Building in Heerlen, Netherlands

Coordinates: 50.884512°N 5.990661°E

- Model of the Monseigneur Schrijnen Retreat House, model created by Jos Driesen
- Interactive map of the Monseigneur Schrijnen Retreat House area

General information
- Architectural style: International Style
- Location: Heerlen, Netherlands
- Completed: 1933

Design and construction
- Architect: Frits Peutz

The Monseigneur Schrijnen Retreat House was designed by the famed architect Frits Peutz (best known for the Glaspaleis) in 1932, and named after the 18th bishop of Roermond Laurentius Josephus Antonius Hubertus Schrijnen (Venlo 30 July 1861 – Roermond 26 March 1932). It is located at the top of one of the steepest hills in Heerlen next to the Molenberg and surrounded by the Aambos (a forest). It is one of the biggest buildings designed by Peutz.

It was designated a state monument (Dutch: Rijksmonument) in 1999.

== Uses ==
- 1933-1961 Retreat House for girls
- 1961-1966 Philosophicum
- 1966-1999 First Hogeschool voor Theologie en Pastoraat (Highschool for theology and Pastorate) and later Universiteit voor Theologie en Pastoraat (University for theology and Pastorate).
- 1999 – now home to AGS Architekten & Planners, the successor of the Peutz office

Picture of the main entrance
