= Tellegen =

Tellegen is a surname. Notable people with the surname include:

- Auke Tellegen (1930–2024), Dutch-born American psychologist of the personality
- Bernard D. H. Tellegen, Dutch electrical engineer
- Frits Tellegen (1919–2020), Dutch urban designer
- Jan Willem Tellegen (1859–1921), Dutch politician
- Lou Tellegen, Dutch American silent film and stage actor, director, and screenwriter
- Marie Anne Tellegen, Dutch feminist, resistance fighter and director of the Kabinet der Koningin.
- Ockje Tellegen, Dutch politician
- Toon Tellegen, Dutch children's writer and poet

== See also ==
- Tellegen's theorem, a theorem in netwerk theory, developed by Bernard D. H. Tellegen
