= Cineville (subscription service) =

Dutch ticketing service

- Type: Private
- Industry: Entertainment
- Founded: 2009; 17 years ago
- Founders: Thomas Hosman; Niels Büller; Eelke Hermens; Janna Reinsma
- Headquarters: Amsterdam, Netherlands
- Area served: Netherlands; Belgium
- Services: Subscription-based movie ticketing
- Website: www.cineville.nl

Cineville is a Dutch subscription-based movie ticketing service. Users pay a monthly fee which allows them an unlimited amount of visits to select movie theaters using their "Cineville pass." Originally founded in Amsterdam, the service expanded into the rest of the Netherlands by 2011. The service expanded into Belgium by 2022 as a separate entity: Dutch users cannot utilize their pass in Belgium and vice versa. As of June 2024, Cineville is valid in 68 cinemas across 40 Dutch cities, while Cineville Belgium is valid in 23 theaters across 11 cities.

== History ==
Cineville was founded by a group of four students working at Kriterion cinema; they were motivated by a desire to change the "old-fashioned" image of arthouse movie theaters in The Netherlands. The company was originally a "collective" of 13 arthouse cinemas in Amsterdam, uniting in part due to the perceived hegemony of commercial multiplex film theaters.

By 2019, the service launched an app. During the COVID-19 lockdowns in The Netherlands, Cineville founded a temporary platform for streaming arthouse film called "Vitamine Cineville." They credit this platform with retaining over 75% of their membership during the lockdowns.

Cineville Belgium was started in 2022 as a subsidiary. It was an initiative of five Brussels arthouse movie theaters that had suffered significant losses of income during the COVID-19 pandemic in Belgium. The Belgian Cineville pass expanded into Wallonia in May 2023, and into Flanders in September 2024.

In March 2023, a subsidiary in Austria was founded, which uses the technical backend of Cineville, but does not use the name and branding, but uses the name 'Nonstop - Dein Kinoabo'. The Nonstop group consists of 45 cinemas, including 8 open-air venues. Nineteen of the 45 cinemas are in Vienna.

In August 2024, a subsidiary in Germany was founded, using both the technical backend and branding of Cineville. It started with cinemas in Berlin, Hamburg, Cologne, Nuremberg and Freiburg and is set to expand to more regions soon.

== Membership ==
Membership in The Netherlands
Time period	Membership
May 2012	7.000
February 2013	10.000
April 2015	16.000
2017	30.000
December 2018	40.000
April 2019	44.000
January 2020	50.000
December 2021	55.000
March 2023	70.000
January 2025	97.700

Membership in Belgium
Time period	Membership
September 2022	800
September 2023	5.000
December 2023	6.800
June 2024	8.500

By 2019, over half of Dutch Cineville users were between the ages of 20 and 39. On average, they visited the cinema 30 times per year. In Belgium, the average age of visitors is also between 20 and 30.
