= Frits Dantuma =

Dutch footballer

Personal information
- Full name: Frits Dantuma
- Date of birth: 3 August 1992 (age 34)
- Place of birth: Veenwouden, Netherlands
- Height: 1.78 m (5 ft 10 in)
- Position: Midfielder

Team information
- Current team: Broekster Boys

Youth career
- Cambuur

Senior career*
Years	Team	Apps	(Gls)
2010–2013	Cambuur	9	(0)
2013–2014	Emmen	16	(0)
2014–2015	HHC Hardenberg	36	(0)
2015–2019	ONS Sneek		
2019	Harkemase Boys		
2020	Broekster Boys		
2020–2024	Flevo Boys		
2024–	Broekster Boys		
- * Club domestic league appearances and goals as of 11 August 2015 (UTC)

Frits Dantuma (born 3 August 1992, in Veenwouden) is a Dutch professional footballer who currently plays as a midfielder for Broekster Boys.

== Club career ==
He formerly played for SC Cambuur, FC Emmen, for whom he signed in 2013, and amateur side HHC Hardenberg. He joined ONS Sneek in 2015. He later played for Harkemase Boys and Flevo Boys. He returned to Broekster Boys in 2024.
