= Frits Tellegen =

Dutch urban designer (1919–2020)

Frits Tellegen (9 July 1919 – 16 July 2020) was a Dutch urban designer from Lelystad.

== Biography ==
Tellegen was born in Amsterdam on 9 July 1919.

During World War II, Tellegen was rector at the Amsterdams Lyceum. In 1941, he refused to sign the Ariërverklaring (Aryan statement), and refused to dismiss the 72 Jewish children and teachers at the school. He was fired in 1942, and in 1944 was sent to Amersfoort concentration camp for three months.

In 1948 he graduated from the Delft University of Technology as a civil engineer. The same year, he married Louise Maier. After graduation, Tellegen joined successively the engineering firm of “Hasselt en De Koning” (1948-1952) and “Hollandse Betonmaatschappij” (1952-1957). For the latter company, he worked in among others, Baghdad, Iraq. From 1957 until 1964 he worked in Zaandam at “Dienst Gemeentewerken”. He became urban planning director at the Rijksdienst voor de IJsselmeerpolders (RIJP) (translated: National Service for the IJsselmeerpolders) in 1964. He worked here until his retirement in January 1983. He was responsible for designing the city park in Lelystad. He was also involved in designing the cultural centre and event location De Meerpaal in Dronten.

In 2009, a bench was placed in the city park in honour of Tellegen. On the couch is an inscription with the Dutch language text: “Gedachten, arbeid en dankbaarheid” (translated: Thoughts, labour and gratitude).

Tellegen was also an active member of the political party PvdA in Lelystad. Every month he organized a discussion meeting of party members.

Tellegen died on 16 July 2020, aged 101.
