= Royal Theater Heerlen =

Former cinema in Heerlen, Netherlands

Coordinates: 50.88984°N 5.97534°E

Royal Theater
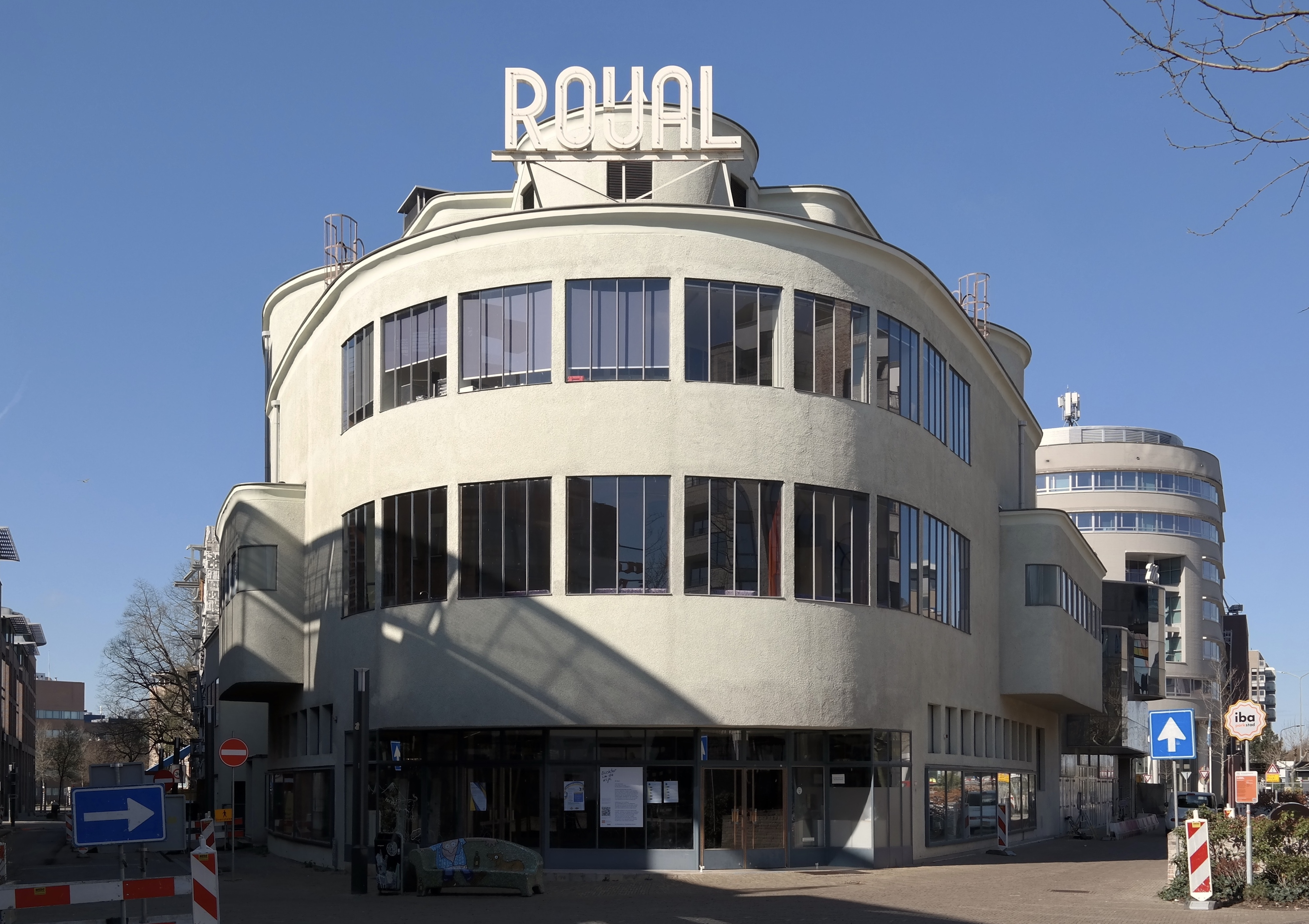
- Royal Theater Heerlen in 2022
- Interactive map of the Royal Theater area

General information
- Architectural style: International Style
- Location: Heerlen, The Netherlands
- Current tenants: Filmhuis De Spiegel
- Construction started: 1937
- Completed: 1938
- Client: Max van Bergen & Mathieu van Bergen
- Owner: Gemeente Heerlen

Design and construction
- Architects: Frits Peutz & J. Bongaerts

Situated close to the Heerlen train station, this egg shaped building dates back to 1938 and was one of the oldest cinemas of the Netherlands. It was designed by Frits Peutz (best known for the Glaspaleis) and J. Bongaerts. The buildings behind it are from a later date and include another building by Peutz (Rivoli, 1958).

It originally had 1180 seats (some sources say 814, but 1180 is more likely); this amount was later reduced by almost half for more leg room, leaving 743 seats).

== History ==
In 1903 Laurentius van Bergen, who ran a funfair company, decided to start a traveling cinema besides his other attractions. He stopped running the cinema, however, to concentrate on his funfair attractions. Twenty years later he left his company to his sons Alexander, Max and Mathieu. They saw little profit in running a funfair company and, in 1931, switched to running cinemas for good. In 1932 they built their first cinema, a huge success, in Roermond. Heerlen, a booming mine city, seemed a good place to run another cinema, although there were already a substantial number of cinemas in downtown Heerlen (Stadschouwburg, Hollandia, and Universal), but since they all belonged to the same owner (Verenigde Bioscoop-Theaters te Heerlen-Hoensbroek, a company owned by Erwin Hirschberg and his brother Curt) the Nederlands Bioscoopbond allowed a new cinema in Heerlen.

While the Hollandia theater was being renovated the building of the Royal started; the Royal was to become the biggest and most beautiful cinema in Limburg. After a building period of 100 days, the Royal Theater opened its doors on January 29, 1938, and surpassed the Hollandia Theater, which had reopened two weeks earlier, in size.
