= Frits Kemp =

- Born: Frits Kemp; 26 February 1954 (age 71); Arnhem, Gelderland, Netherlands
- Education: Law, political science
- Alma mater: University of Amsterdam; University of Nijmegen
- Occupation: Lawyer
- Known for: Lawyer in the Mexx bankruptcy trial
- Spouse: Yvonne Scherpenisse (1988-present)
- Children: Laura Kemp; Elisa Kemp

Frits Kemp (born February 26, 1954) is a Dutch attorney, receiver and activist. Kemp has been a lawyer since 1988 and founded the law firm, FORT in 2001 together with three other partners. On December the 4, 2014 Kemp gained national attention after becoming the receiver of Dutch fashion brand Mexx declaring its 315 stores bankrupt.

Kemp is a member of the activist group 1Overheid, A team of experts in law and finance aiming to prevent fraud in the Netherlands.
