= Frits Schuitema =

Dutch businessman

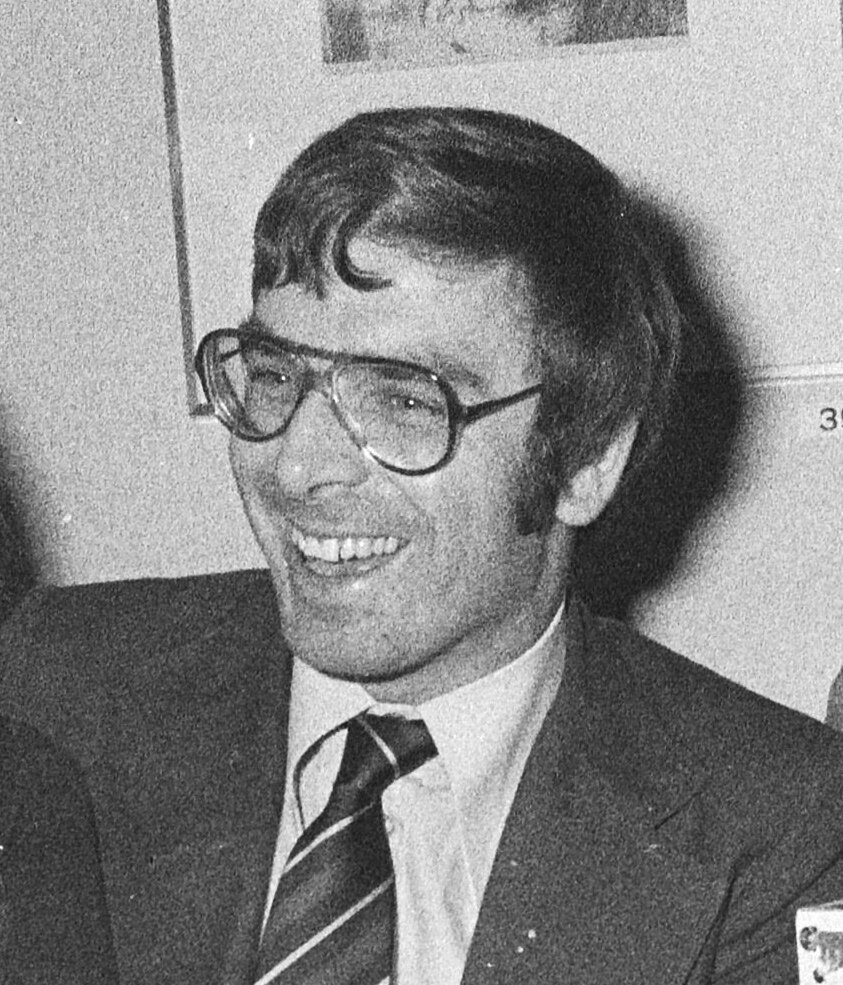
Schuitema after his release

Frits Schuitema (October 1, 1944 in Goes) is a Dutch former chairman of Philips and football director. Between 2006 and 2010, Schuitema served as the chairman of the board of directors of PSV Eindhoven. In October 2006 he took over the position from Rob Westerhof.

In 1978, Schuitema was taken hostage in San Salvador, along with two British bankers and a Japanese businessman, by a leftist guerrilla group known as the Armed Force of National Resistance (FARN). He was released unharmed by his kidnappers after 36 days in captivity.

Schuitema has been involved with PSV Eindhoven since 1990. First as president of the 'Foundation PSV Football', later as member of the board of directors.

In April 2007 he had a conflict with PSV manager Ronald Koeman about the lack of support Koeman had from the board and especially Schuitema. He declared that this conflict was exaggerated in the press, although Koeman disagreed. This conflict will influence the position of Ronald Koeman, as he said in an interview with Tien.
