= Glaspaleis =

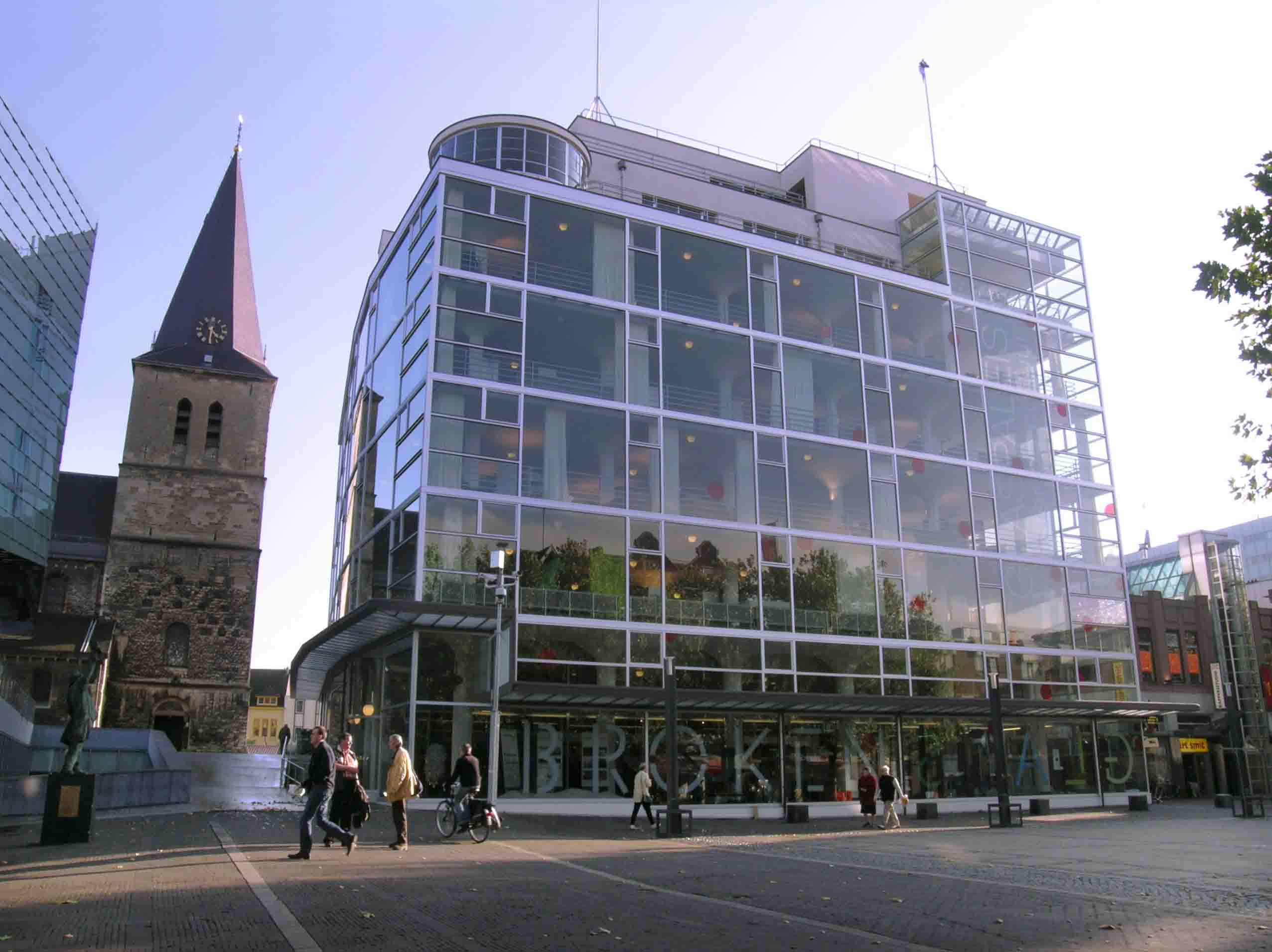
- The Glaspaleis seen from the market square (Bongerd).

General information
- Architectural style: Modernism
- Location: Heerlen, Netherlands
- Coordinates: 50.8879°N 5.9793°E
- Construction started: 1934
- Completed: 1935
- Cost: 184,500 guilders
- Client: Peter Schunck & Schunck

Design and construction
- Architect: Frits Peutz

The Glaspaleis (in English: Glass Palace) is a modernist building in Heerlen, Netherlands, built in 1935. Formerly a fashion house and department store, Schunck, it is now the cultural centre of the city. The original name was Modehuis Schunck (Schunck Fashion House), but it was soon nicknamed Glaspaleis, which is now the official name.

The architectural style is largely according to what is in the Netherlands known as het Nieuwe Bouwen, which corresponds roughly to Modernism, Bauhaus and International style. The visually most distinguishing aspect is the free-standing glass that covers three sides, which makes it even more transparent than the famous Bauhaus building in Dessau and is part of the natural climate control.

- In 1995, it was declared a National Monument for the purpose of historic preservation
- In 1999, it was put on the list of the 1000 most important buildings of the 20th century by the International Union of Architects during their World Congress in Beijing.
- In 2004, it won the first Bouwfonds Award in the category 'Vital Monuments'.
- In 2005, it won the Nederlandse Bouwprijs (Dutch Construction Award) in the 'Projects' category.
- In 2005, it also won the Nationale Renovatieprijs (National Renovation Award) in the 'Utiliteitsbouw' category.

== Planning ==
The layout, showing the old and the new business. The passage is at ground floor level, leading to the main entrance in the centre and a second one at the back. A = the connection between the old shop and the Glaspaleis B = Vroom en Dreesman (see text) C = Logister's umbrella shop

The Glaspaleis was commissioned in 1934 by fabric merchant Peter Schunck, who had studied architectural magazines and visited several department stores throughout Europe to find inspiration, together with Frits Peutz, a relatively young and somewhat controversial architect (because he was a modernist but not in a dogmatic way). They were especially inspired by the architecture of a department store in Nantes, France, Les Grands Magasins Decré (built 1932, and destroyed during a bombing raid in 1943), designed by Henri Sauvage (1873–1932) in Art Deco style. Another source of inspiration for Peutz was the 1930 Van Nelle Factory in Rotterdam, a classical example of this style at the time.

A third player (next to Schunck and Peutz) who made this sort of building possible was the then mayor Marcel van Grunsven, who wanted to modernise Heerlen in avangardist fashion, thus ensuring the required permits were no problem, despite the fact that the local planning board had opposed precisely the innovative aspects of the design. But the City council gave the go ahead, apart from a few minor points. The job was given to Maastrichtse Betonijzerbouw (reinforced concrete builder) P. Knols, who had made the lowest bid at 184,500 guilders.

Like the old shop, the Glaspaleis was built bang in the middle of three squares in the centre of Heerlen, with the new Market Square ('de Bongerd') to the North, the Church Square to the West and the Emma Square to the South, behind the old shop, which was to remain in use and connected to the Glaspaleis. The market used to be at the Church Square, but when it moved to the new Market Square, the shop lost its strategic location, which was one reason for the move.

Department store chain Vroom & Dreesmann, who had opened a store right next to the site five years earlier ('B' in the overview), bought one of the houses at the opposite side of the location (Logister's umbrella shop - 'C') to hamper Schunck's efforts, but this was solved by simply building around it. Vroom en Dreesman never made use of the house, which was located in between the old shop and the new Glaspaleis, leaving it to decay. It remained an eyesore until well after World War II. Schunck only managed to buy it in 1960, for the exorbitant price of 2.000.000 guilders.

The buildings to the South (including the old shop) have since been torn down, creating the much larger Pancratius Square. The section to the West was given to the City and cleared, creating a pedestrian passage between the Pancratius and Market Squares. As a result, the Glaspaleis is now completely free-standing. The building to the East has been replaced by the music school annex.

== Architecture ==
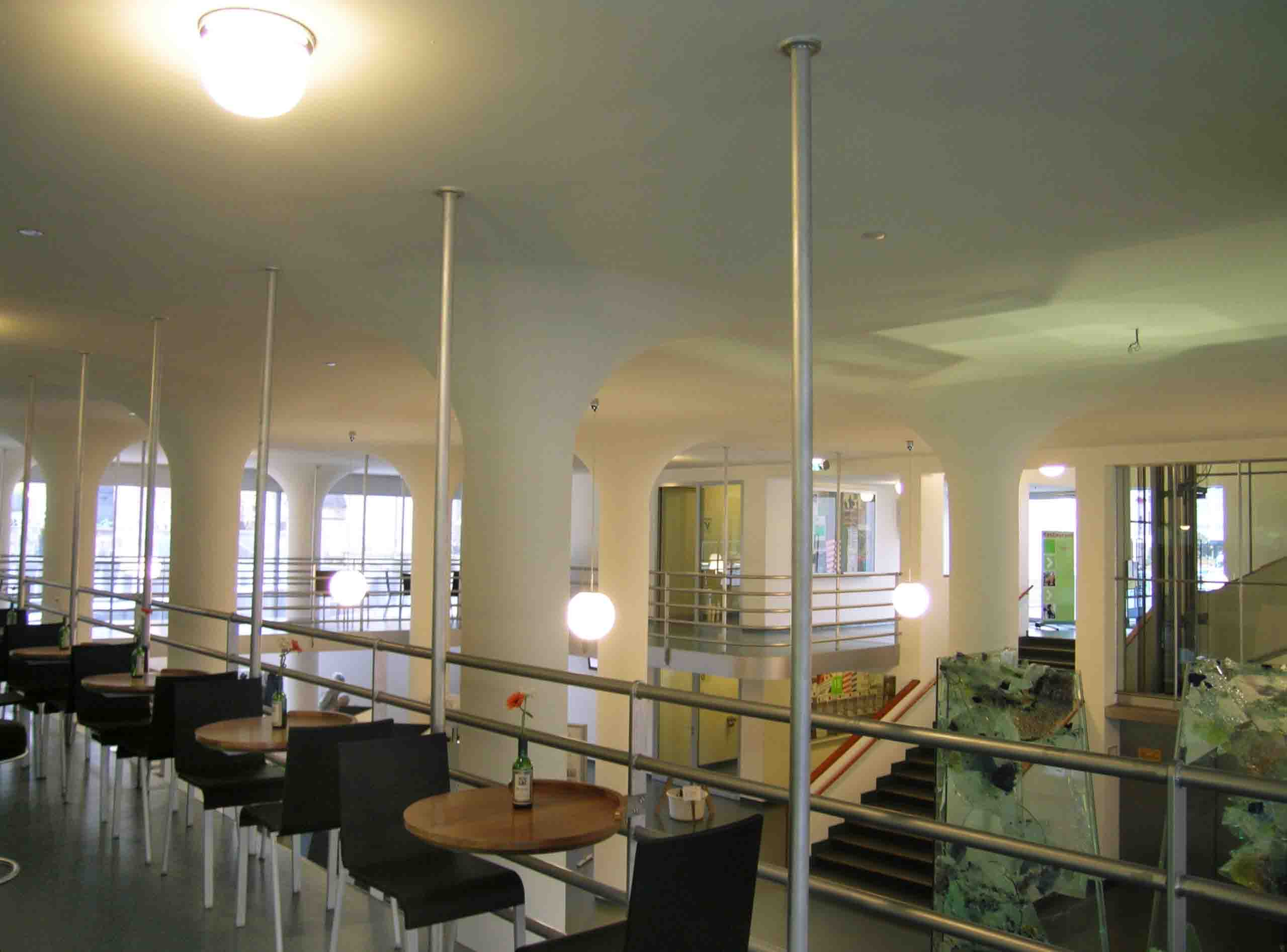
The mezzanine and ground floor, seen from the location of the former offices, suspended from the ceiling.

The purpose of the hypermodern, functional building was to create an atmosphere of a market, with all goods (cloth, clothes, carpets and beds) displayed in the shop instead of back in the stock-room, a rather revolutionary idea at the time, as were the shopping windows of the old 1894 shop (for such a rural town), an idea that was taken to the extreme in the new building. The result was a structure of stacked and covered 'hanging' markets, protected against the elements by the freestanding glass encasing on three sides (North, East and West).

The Glaspaleis is a good example of early modern architecture, made of glass, steel and concrete (except for some marble, wood and copper on the ground floor). Each floor has about 30 mushroom-shaped pillars, ever narrower as one goes up the floors. Part of the multifunctionality lies in the fact that, apart from the back, there are no walls inside the building, creating not only an open atmosphere, but also leaving more freedom in filling in the space. None of the walls are load-bearing, neither the ones at the back, nor the basement walls, even though they are made of reinforced concrete, to resist soil (6–9 m) and water pressure, insofar as the pressure has not been absorbed by the outer walls of the insulation gaps (covered at street level) that are meant to protect the building against traffic vibrations and noise and for ventilation of the basement.

There is no front as such - this is only defined by the fact that one side faces the market square. At the moment the building is completely free-standing, almost surrounded by three squares. What can be regarded as the back used to be connected to the former shop, but that and all the other buildings at that side have since been torn down to extend the Emma square to the Glaspaleis, thus creating the larger Pancratius Square.

The 30 x 30 m building consists of, from the bottom up, two cellars, ground floor, mezzanine, four more former shop-floors, two penthouse levels for the Schunck family, the lower of which was partly a semi-covered roof terrace with a restaurant, and an accessible top roof. At seven floors (eight floors in US parlance) and a height of 26.5 m, it was at the time the tallest building in Heerlen (not counting the tip of the church tower next to it). It has been called a 'palace for the people', especially for the miners, who formed an important factor in this coal mining town, also because they were well paid for manual labourers at the time.

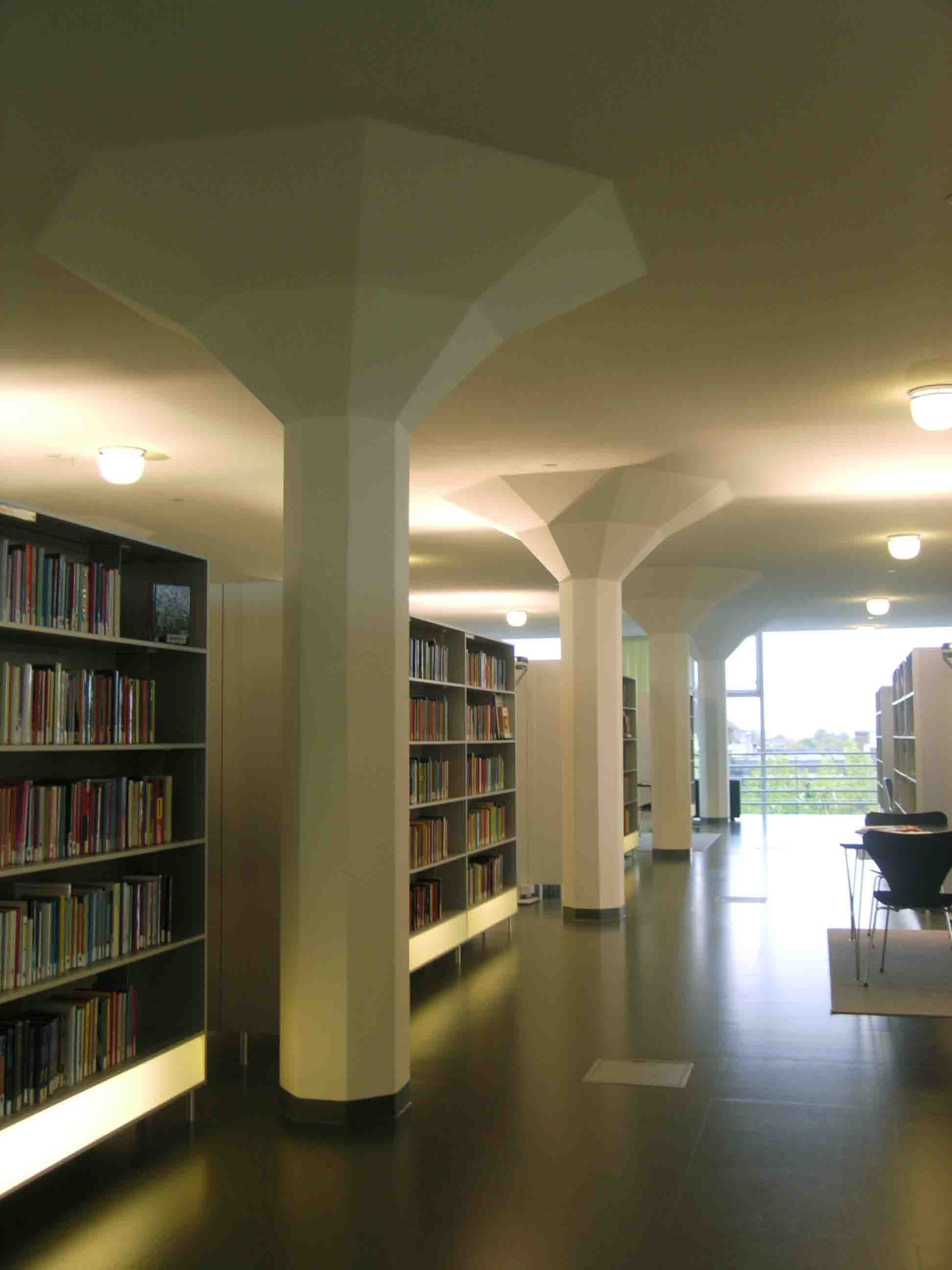
The interior of the Glaspaleis library, featuring the building's mushroom-shaped pillars.

The pillars are mushroom-shaped for two reasons. The first is utilitarian; the floors were constructed beamless for better daylighting and, thus, light reflection (beams cast very long shadows). This has the additional advantage of simplifying the placing and moving of cables and lighting fixtures. And the mushroom shapes give an impression of greater height. The second, constructional, advantage is that the steel bundle reinforcement in two directions makes the structure equally rigid in all directions. Since future mining activity was impossible to predict, a large resistance in all directions to sagging was desirable.

Although Peutz built largely according to the International style, he did not surrender completely to functionalism but used some wood for the interior and marble in the stairs at ground floor (which has since been removed). The columns are, for reasons other than functionality or construction, of different shapes and sizes at different floor levels - round on the ground floor/mezzanine and first floor and octagonal elsewhere and getting narrower as one goes up.

=== Artistic representations ===
Peutz made several preliminary drawings of his design (fewer than usually though), in which he also showed an interest in the surroundings, with some drawings of a possible layout of the adjacent squares and others of the Glaspaleis itself, showing how, on dark days, the surrounding buildings would reflect in the glass. Architectural photographer Werner Mantz made sixteen photographs of the building in 1935, now kept at the Nederlands Foto Archief (Netherlands photograph archive) in Rotterdam. Being an icon for the firm, the building also featured prominently in advertisements, many of which appeared in the magazine de Mijnwerker ('the Mineworker'). And at the 75-year anniversary of the business, a fireworks representation of the Glaspaleis was built.

=== Glass ===
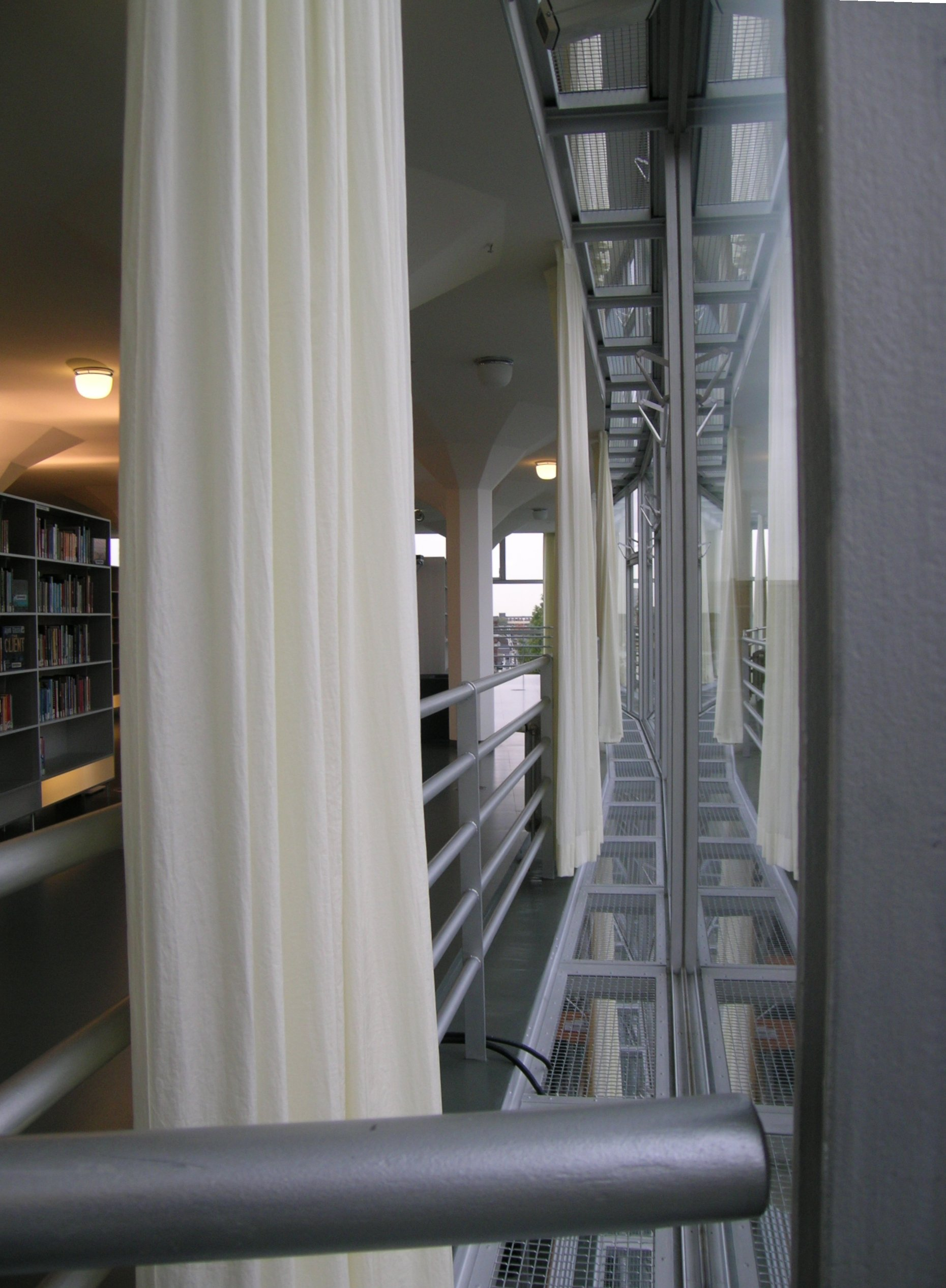
The gap between the floors and the free standing glass encasing, with a metal grid to prevent anything falling through.

The name Glaspaleis stems from the fact that the building is clad in a free-standing encasing of glass (on three sides) around a concrete structure. Apart from the rear section, the penthouse and the basement there are no outer or inner walls, thus eliminating the separation between inside and outside as much as possible. Structurally, it is basically a collection of pillars, intersected by and supporting platforms, surrounded by a glass encasing, which is suspended from the floors. The unusually large size of the windows made the building even more transparent than the famous 1927 Bauhaus building in Dessau, which was praised for its transparency. The fact that the outer pillars are offset from the glass 'walls' makes them 'shadowless' (and loads the foundation slab in the most favourable way).

This structure also enables a 'natural ventilation' through the selective opening of windows. The 50 cm gap between the 17 cm thick floors and the glass encasing also allows for vertical ventilation, if needs be helped by opening glass hatches in the roof. And the glass allows for maximum entry of sunlight. Peutz reported after one year of use of the building, that experience had shown that the 50 cm gap was more than enough. In the early years, the gap has even been reduced in size in some places. In winter only the window flaps in the glass encasing need to be opened and the roof hatches can remain closed. During summer, on the sunny side the curtains should be closed and the hatches opened (note, though, that the south side is the one without glass). The result is a 'double wall' of glass on the outer side and curtains on the inner side, with an upward draft caused by the Sun's heat. This suffices for ventilation and the two surface ducts (as shown on the drawings) were partly intended for mechanical ventilation (with an exhauster fan), but this has turned out to be unnecessary. During winter, heating is done with a hot water installation (of course fuelled with coal) with natural circulation. The radiators along the windows now provide the heat for the circulation. The installed pumps have turned out to be unnecessary. The airtight glass walls have turned out to be better insulators than thought. Also, the mass of the concrete is such a good heat accumulator that extra time heating up the building in the morning has turned out unnecessary and there have never been any major temperature changes. This technology is being rediscovered and used, for example, by Canadian architect Chris Holmes in his energy-saving designs.

Wire mesh has been put in the gaps between the floors and the glass walls to prevent items from falling through. The balustrades along the projecting floor slabs, which are stiffened on the top side with a small upright projection, consist of a linked series of radiators. Hanging cradles on rollers are used for window cleaning.

Along the Market square there is a passage, flanked by display windows, leading to the main entrance in the middle. The 'outer' display is thus an 'island', that is accessible through hatches from the first basement, where the display workshop was located. The passage extends to mezzanine level, so the former offices above the 'inner' display got their daylight through the outer island display and the passage.

=== The 'rear' ===
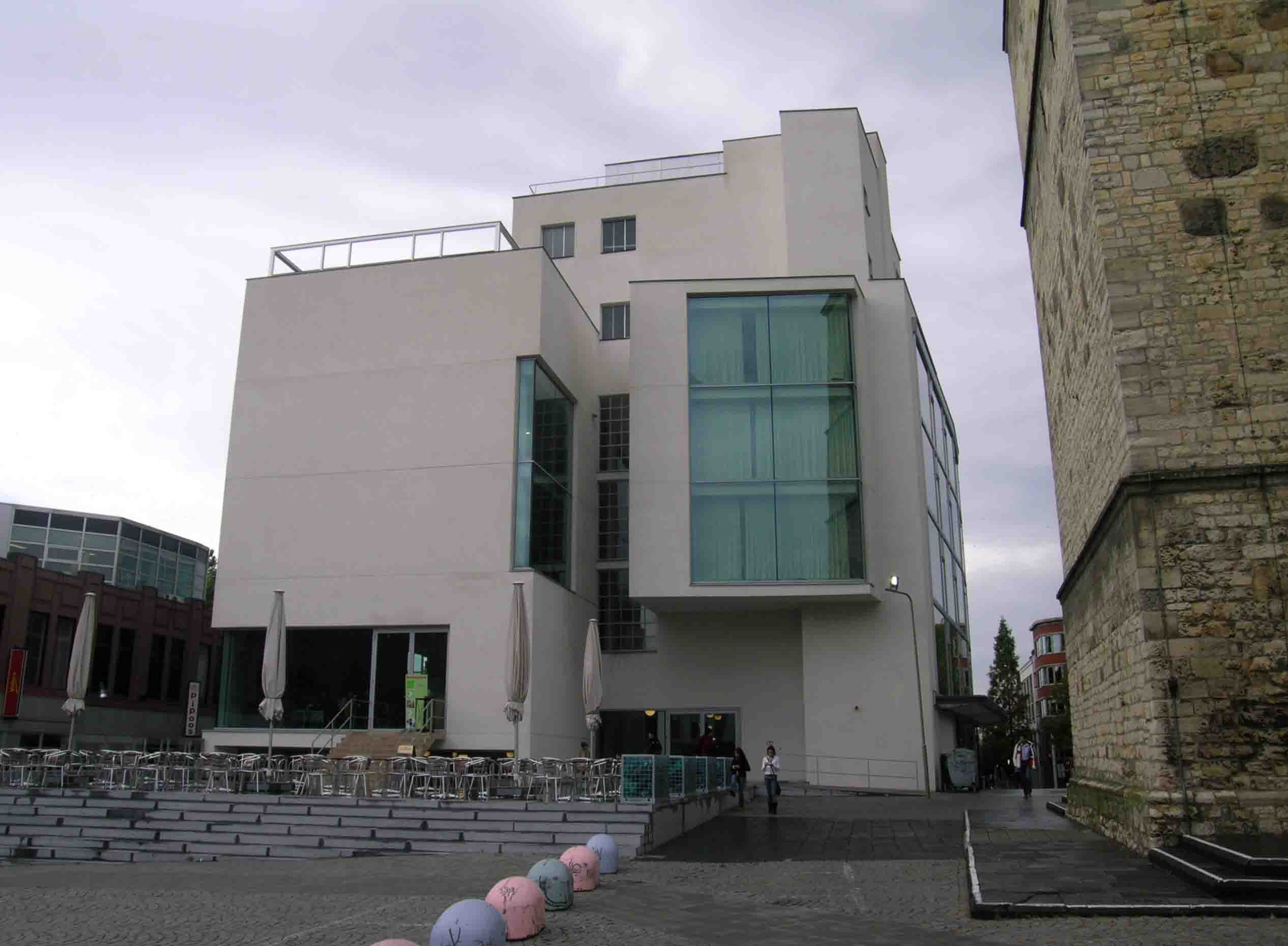
The rear side of the Glaspaleis, where the old shop used to be and which now faces the Pancratius Square.

The back of the Glaspaleis, which is not made of glass, houses the stairs, lifts, toilets, (former) dispatch area and other facilities. There was also a connection from the rear of the building to the old Schunck shop, which was still in use in the beginning, for those who felt uncomfortable entering such a modern building. There, business went on as before, except that the goods were now fetched from the new building instead of 'from the back' (although for the customers this difference was not visible). This attention to the customers was one reason for the success of the business. Despite the size of the business, Peter Schunck regularly made his round through the store (as did his daughter after him), with his calotte on his balding head, being an easily recognised personification of the store.

The Pancratius square is 2.5 m higher than the Market square. This is one reason for the impressive height of the ground floor. The cellars of the old shop were integrated into the ground floor of the Glaspaleis and the ground and higher floors of the old shop were connected to the mezzanine and first and second floors of the Glaspaleis through the main stairs at the rear in an architecturally interesting fashion. Today, the mezzanine connects to the Pancratius square through a restaurant and a flight of outside stairs. The mezzanine at the front housed the offices, which are suspended from the first floor.

There are four lifts, originally two for customers, one for goods and one private use, leading up to the penthouse.

=== Penthouse and basement ===
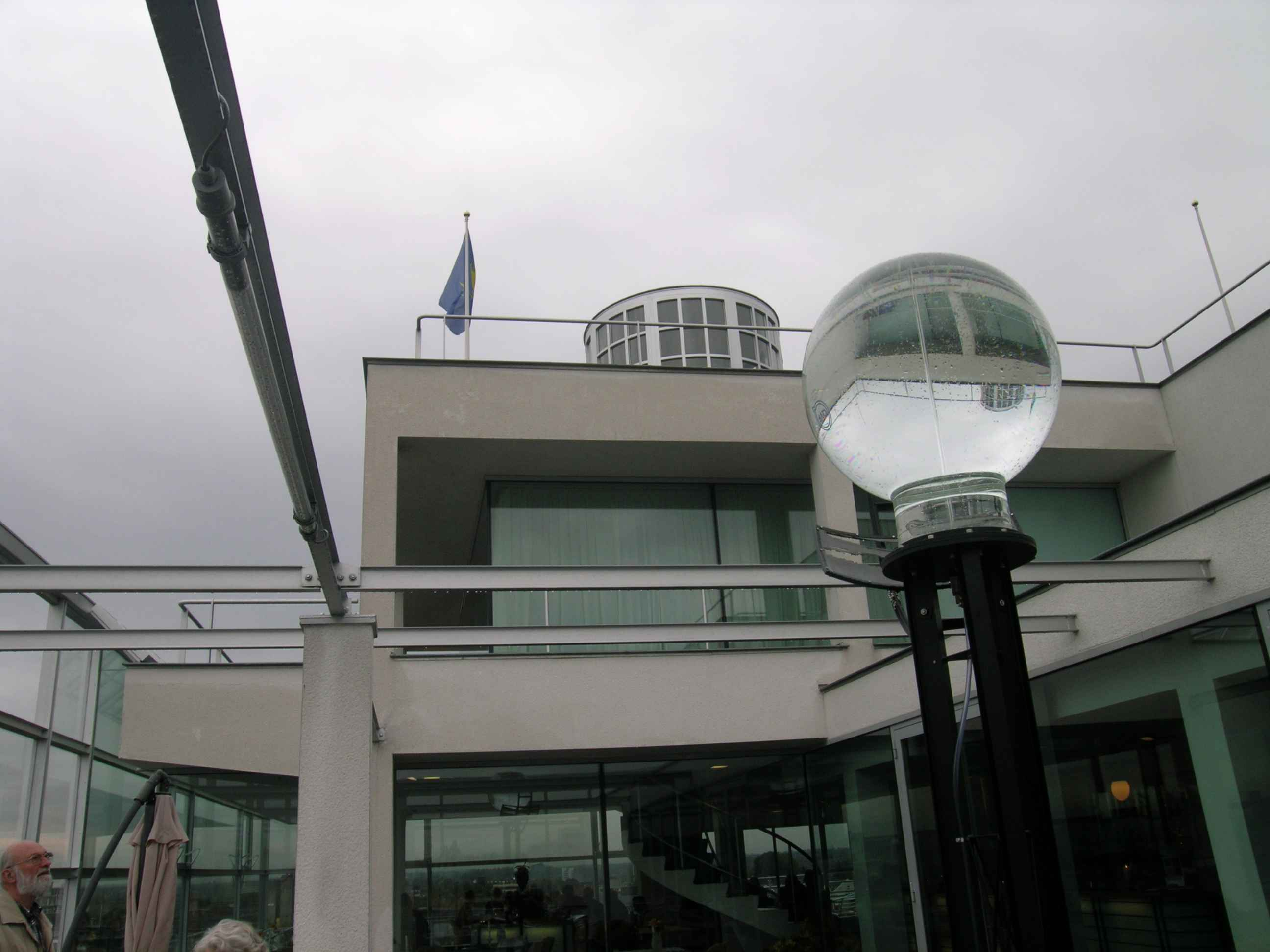
The penthouse.

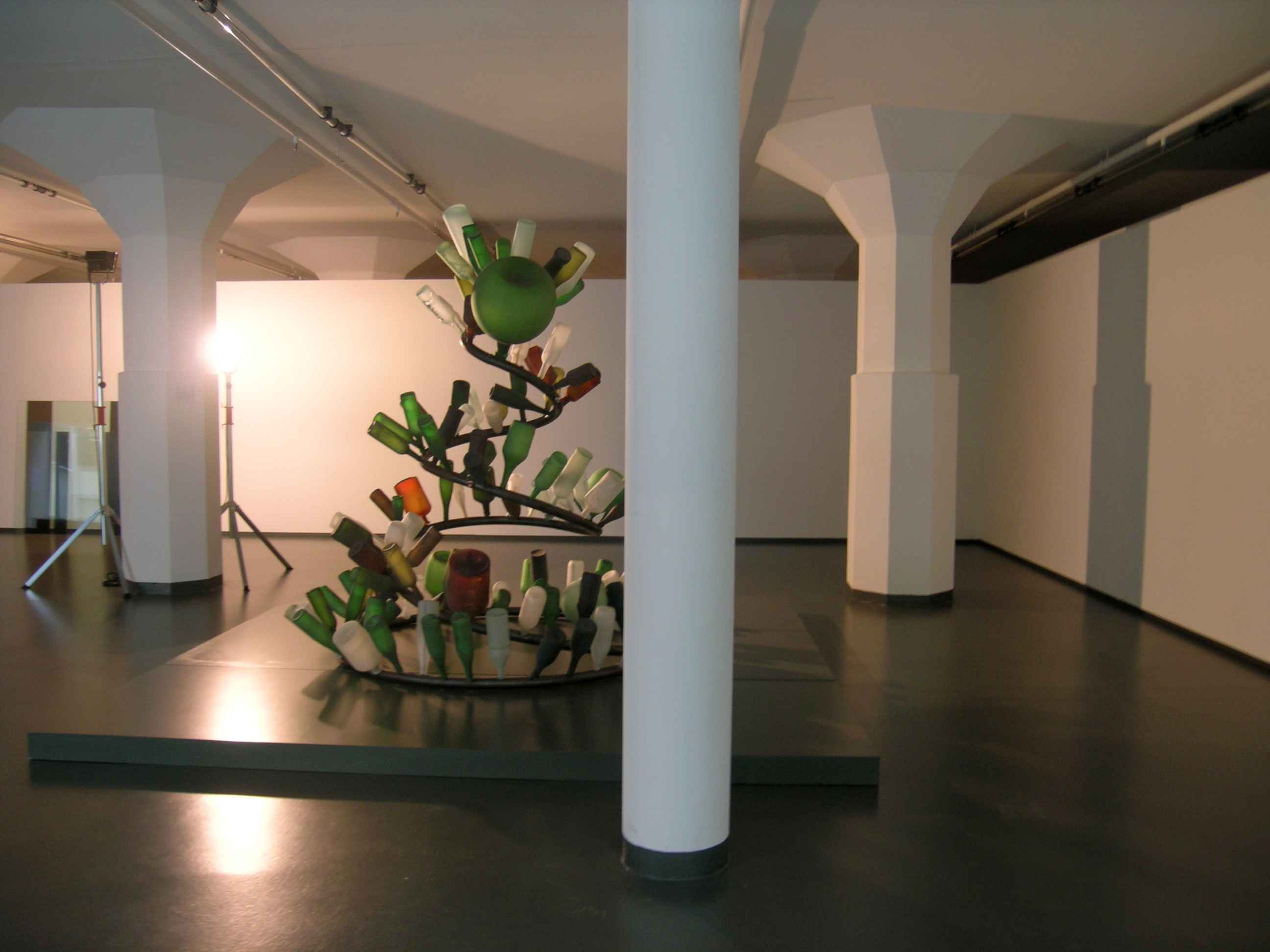
A glassart exposition in the basement.

The two penthouse levels, which are somewhat smaller in surface than the other floors, thus creating a balcony, have a terrace each on the west side, with the lower level protected against the prevailing winds at the northwest side by a glass screen, and above that is an accessible uncovered roof top, the so-called daktuin (roof garden), a name that was used for the penthouse as a whole. This rooftop platform extends over the second level terrace, thus covering it. The lower terrace is now a restaurant, which it also was in summer when the Schunck family lived there. The second penthouse level and roof top are not accessible to the public. Nor is the second (lower) basement. Because the basement slab had to be placed at the considerable depth of 6.5 m, in places there are three basement levels. The basements were used for machinery, storage and workshops. The centre of the first basement was a sales area, the part that is now accessible to the public.

Peter Schunck compared the structure of the building with a ship, floating on uncertain ground. The foundation is basically a concrete trough, that can 'give a little' if any mining shafts were to be dug under it. This 'ship' would then never be able to capsize. During construction, the moat of the old Roman settlement Coriovallum was uncovered, which was the reason to lay the foundation deeper than originally planned. Inside the old walls the subsoil was firm, but outside them it was very bad. Building such a structure on such ground in a mining area was deemed too risky and the ground was cleared until a single layer of equal overall weakness was encountered, a 12 m thick sand layer. This sand is generally considered a bad foundation soil, but in a mining area it is a good choice because it flows and 'gives' evenly in case of a cave-in in a mine below it. Still, Peutz decided that the soil pressure should not exceed 1 kgf/cm^{2} (100 kPa). So for the foundation he used a reinforced concrete slab extending under the whole building. This 50 cm thick beamless foundation slab is mushroom-shaped.

The maximum load is 500 kg/m^{2} for the floors and stairs and 1000 kg/m^{2} for the dispatch area. A maximum wind pressure of 150 kgf/m^{2} was allowed for. A reduction in the column load was not incorporated.

== Decay and renovation ==
During the Second World War the building was bombed three times (each time new glass had to be put in) and towards the end of the war it was the headquarters of generals Patton and Simpson, and a few months later it served as a 'restcentre' for the French maquis (resistance), of whom especially the latter didn't treat the interior in a very respectful manner.

In 1964, Schunck moved to another building (Schunck Promenade) and the Glaspaleis was given a new sales-function. This opportunity was taken to replace the old lifts (with iron folding doors) with a more modern type. During that renovation, the entrances were also improved. Six years later, the Glaspaleis was rented out to the Pension Fund (Algemeen Burgerlijk Pensioenfonds). After that, decay started setting in. Even before that, in 1962, the city had wanted to have the penthouse removed. In 1973 architect Bep Groenedijk bought the building and ruined the open atmosphere (so central to the functionality of the building) by putting in tinted glass. In 1974 the building was reopened as a shopping centre, including a supermarket. For a while it even housed a Pizza Hut fastfood joint. This started an exodus. In 1990, after it had not been used for a while, there were even plans to tear the building down. Until early 1993, it was owned by Swedish company, that had put it in a separate BV. When that BV got into financial troubles, the building was sold to Hardy BV in Amsterdam, through mediation by the Swedish SE-bank. For a year, Hardy tried to find a new destination for it. But then it turned out that the SE-bank was not able to transfer ownership completely, so the contract became void. Not knowing what to do with the building, the bank decided to declare the original BV bankrupt and sell the Glaspaleis. In 1994, it was bought during a public sale by Northdoor BV from Amsterdam, closely related to the SE-bank. The two had agreed beforehand that this would be the minimum price and there were no other bidders. By that time there were plans to nominate the Glaspaleis as a National Monument and the SE-bank said they would await the decision before themselves deciding what to do with it.

=== Renovation ===
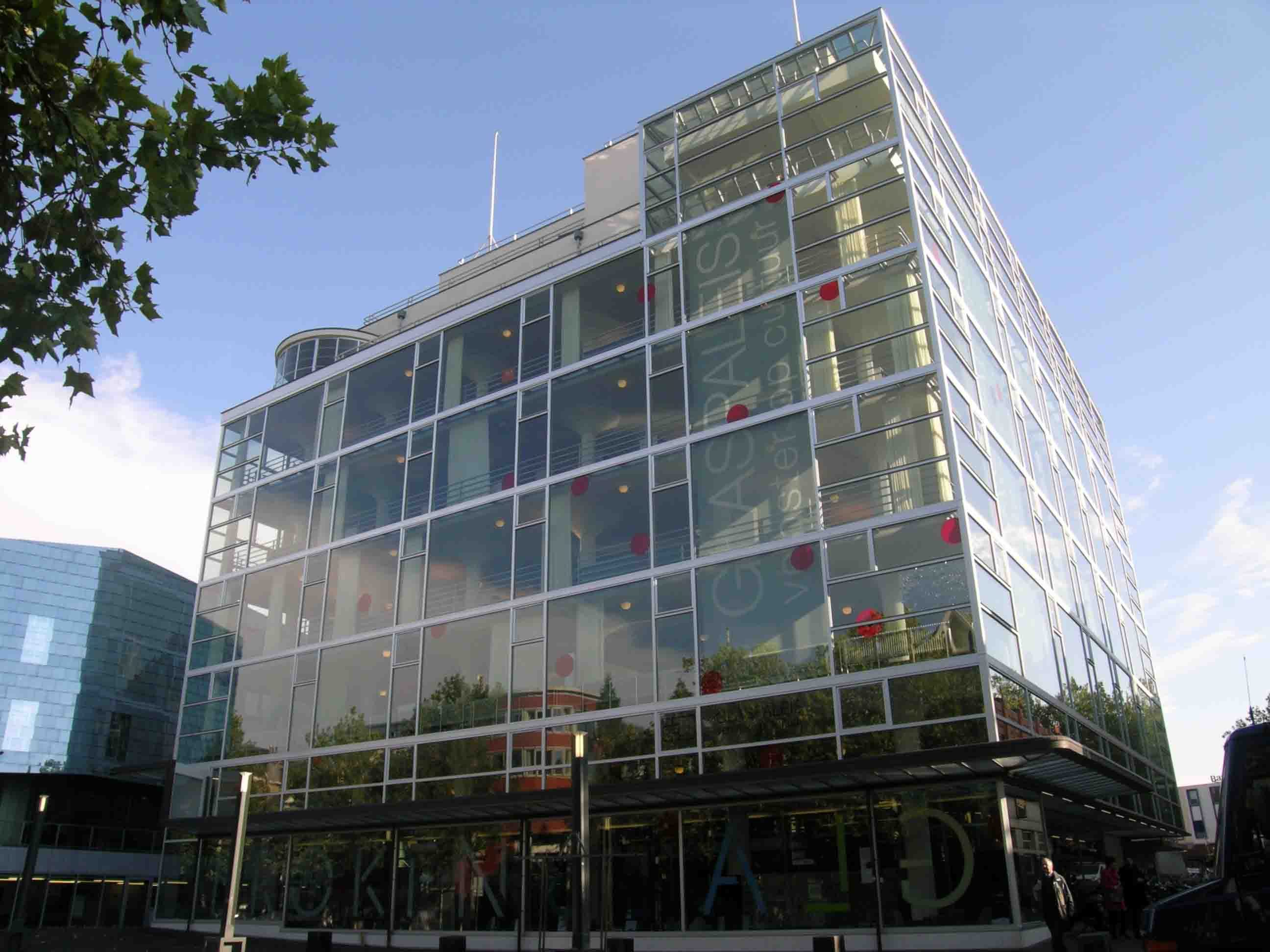
The front (North West) side of the present, renovated Glaspaleis.

The plans to tear the Glaspaleis down were the last straw for some admirers of the building. In 1993 Nic Tummers started a workgroup ('Werkgroep Behoud Glaspaleis') and Wiel Arets and others started the F.P.J.Peutz Foundation. These efforts were supported by alderman Seijben and in 1994 the City council applied for a monument status. In 1995 the building was declared a National Monument and in 1997 the City bought it (a unanimous decision) to turn it into a cultural centre. In 1999, the international architect and Peutz-admirer Wiel Arets, and Jo Coenen were commissioned to restore the building to its original state (done by building contractor Laudy-Heijmans). Only minor changes were made to the original design. For instance, the floors were made 17 cm thicker to hide the piping and wiring and floor heating and cooling. And the original highly transparent flint glass was no longer available in the appropriate dimensions. But these differences are not visible to the naked eye (unlike some others - see below). These have to do with modern standards such as construction regulations, durability, double glazing (without losing transparency, so no heat-absorbing coating was used) and other energy savers. For this it won the Nationale Renovatieprijs (National Renovation Award) in the Utiliteitsbouw category. Main points were re-installing transparent windows and the natural ventilation system. In keeping with the rest of the squares around it and much of the city centre of Heerlen, the Bongerd was made car-free.

Work started in August 2000 and finished on 1 September 2003, when it was opened to the public. Among other things, it now housed a music school, for which an annex was built that connects to the Glaspaleis underground. The total surface area of the Glaspaleis plus the music school annex is 10.000 m^{2}. The annex is totally covered in mirroring slates, an entirely new idea (trying to mirror the uniqueness of the Glaspaleis when that was built). The total cost of the renovation (plus building of the annex) was 30 million €, twice the planned cost (and over 300 times the cost of the original building, without inflation correction), of which 10% was covered by a government subsidy, decided upon by state secretary Rick van de Ploeg in 2001.

The official opening took place on 30 June 2004. On 27 May 2004 this renovation received the Dutch 'Bouwfonds Award' for 'Most Vital Monument' (a reward for monuments that have been given a public function to keep them alive) because it is "a shining example of perfect revitalisation and optimal public accessibility". And a year later it received the Nederlandse Bouwprijs (Dutch Construction Prize) in the 'Projects' category as "a renovation to a young monument that radiates optimism about building a new world". Just as the Glaspaleis had first come to symbolise the rise of Heerlen from sleepy village to bustling industrial town, and then the decay of Heerlen after the closing of the mines, it now symbolises the revival of the city. The new slogan is Venster op Cultuur (Window on Culture), reflecting the intended use for art expositions and cultural events such as music, ballet, film and architecture. Part of the cinema in the penthouse and a large part of the music school rooms are located in new additions at the rear, partly underground. The above ground bits have a secondary function of visually improving the originally rather boring (because largely invisible) rear end. These extensions have been nicknamed 'backpacks' by the locals.

=== Criticism ===
A point of criticism is that little is left of the old penthouse. It had to make way for a restaurant and an arthouse cinema. Also, the multifunctionality that Peutz had in mind (he was an early crossover thinker) has been lost because the different occupants don't cooperate. This is contrary to the synergy that Peutz loved so much. A different point of criticism is that the city now brags with the recognition as one of the 1000 most important buildings of the 20th century, but that reward was given to the original 1930s building that the city had left to decay until it started being recognised as an important monument.

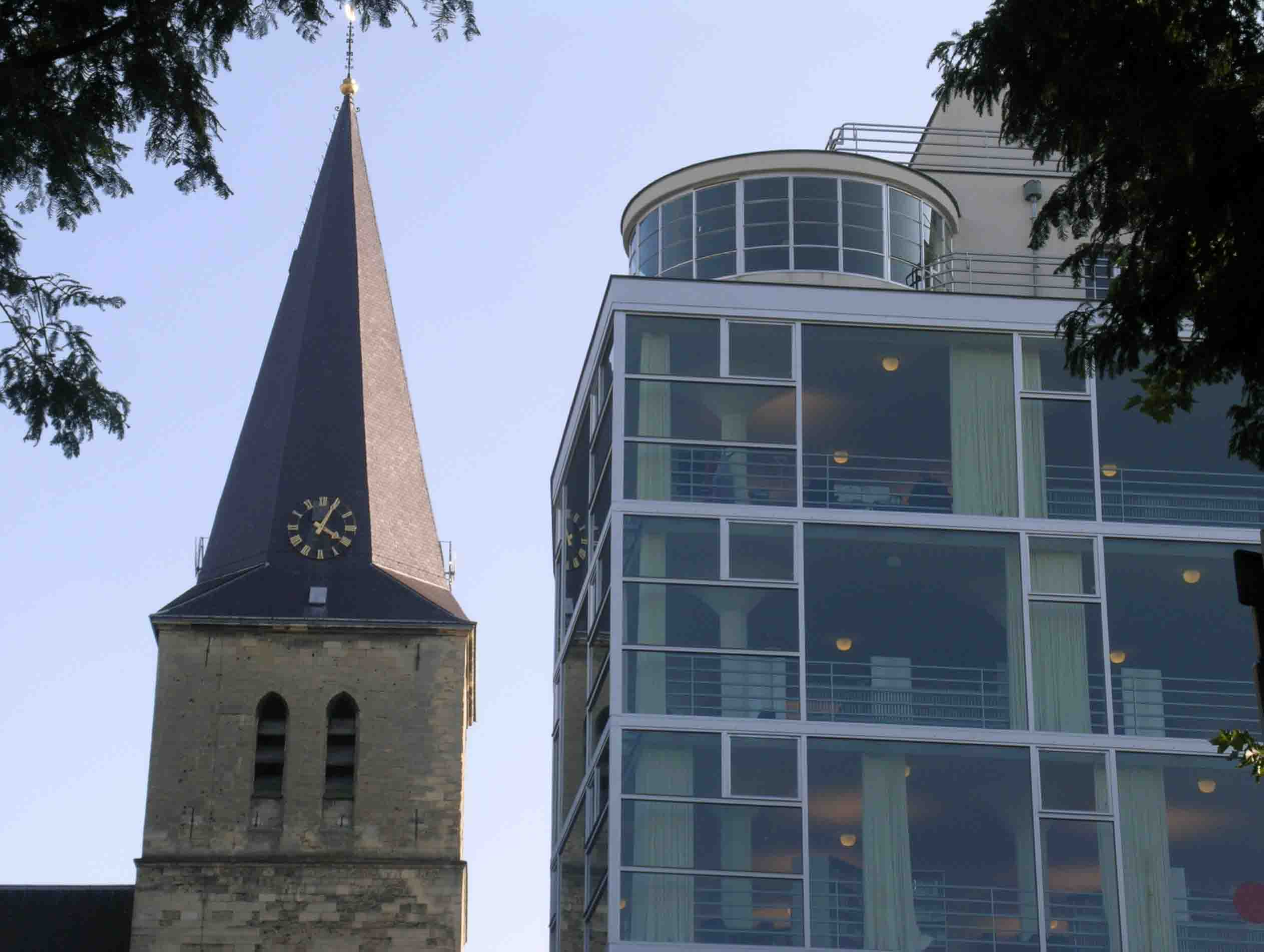
The penthouse bay of the Glaspaleis and the church tower in the background.

This modern and 'open' building contrasts sharply with the 13th century 'closed' Romanesque Pancratius Church next to it. The then pastor, Pierre Jochems, was quite enthusiastic about this modern building, but his successor, Theo van Galen, was less pleased with its dominance over the church. Peutz had actually decided to respect the venerable character of the church by giving this secular building its own contrasting form, sober and businesslike. It was never meant as a monument of architecture. But the passing of time has made it just that.

== Present use ==
The Glaspaleis now houses the public library, an art gallery and an architectural centre ('Vitruvianum'). A music school with 2900 students is housed in a new building, connected to the Glass Palace through the first basement, ground floor and mezzanine floor. Some rooms in the Glaspaleis itself are also part of the music school, including a ballet room in the basement. At ground floor and in the penthouse are restaurants.

The 'Stadsgalerij' (city gallery) is housed in the basement, but expositions are also occasionally shown on other floors. It is building up a collection of modern art, such as COBRA and related art. Its eccentric position in relation to other Dutch art museums makes it important for the region.

The library is spread over four floors and is the big attractor with 250,000 visitors per year, which also benefits the other occupants. Conversely, its collection has a focus on the topics of the other occupants, resulting in a dynamic situation of mutual cultural impulses.

From 2003 the Glaspaleis also housed the arthouse cinema, De Spiegel ('the Mirror'), a volunteer organisation. In 2018 the cinema moved to the Royal Theater Heerlen.

== See also ==
- Schunck, for background information, focusing on the business side of the construction (such as acquisition and interior), plus additional (older) photos.

== Sources ==
- Schunck's Glass Palace, a bilingual (Dutch/English) book with the original drawings by Peutz, the journal of the site superintendent, background information and many photos. April 1996, ISBN 90-73367-10-7
- Glaspaleis - van warenhuis tot cultuurmarkt, in Dutch.
