= TU Delft Faculty of Architecture =

Division of Delft University of Technology, Netherlands

Coordinates: 52°00′20.7″N 4°22′13.7″E

Faculty of Architecture and the Built Environment at TU Delft
- Faculteit Bouwkunde
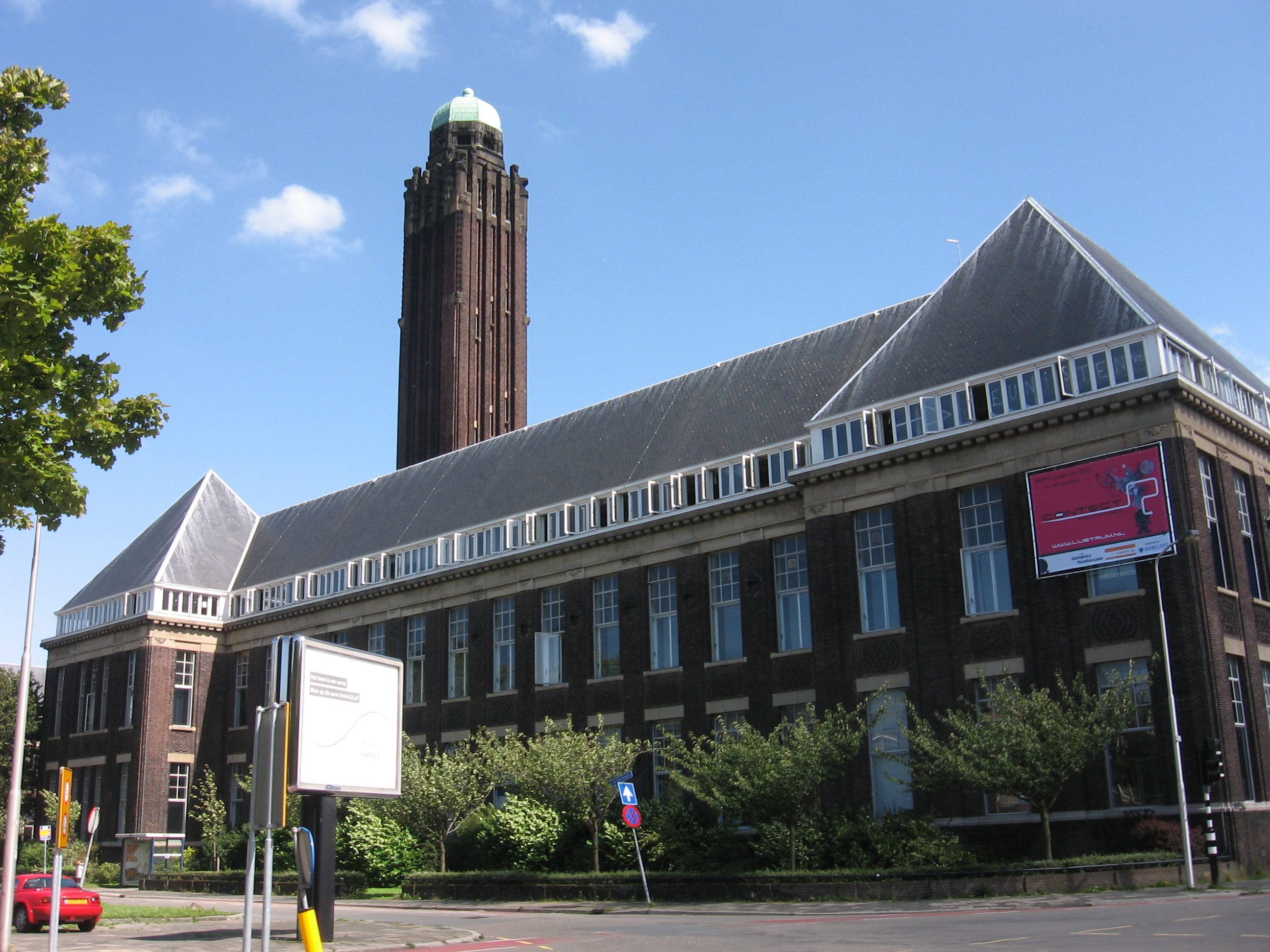
- Other names: BK; BK City
- Type: Public
- Established: 1904
- Dean: Machiel van Dorst
- Faculty: 351
- Students: 2,593 (2016)
- Undergraduates: 1,073 (2016)
- Postgraduates: 1,515 (2016)
- Other students: 5 (2016)
- Location: Delft, South Holland, 2628 BL, Netherlands
- Website: www.tudelft.nl/bk/

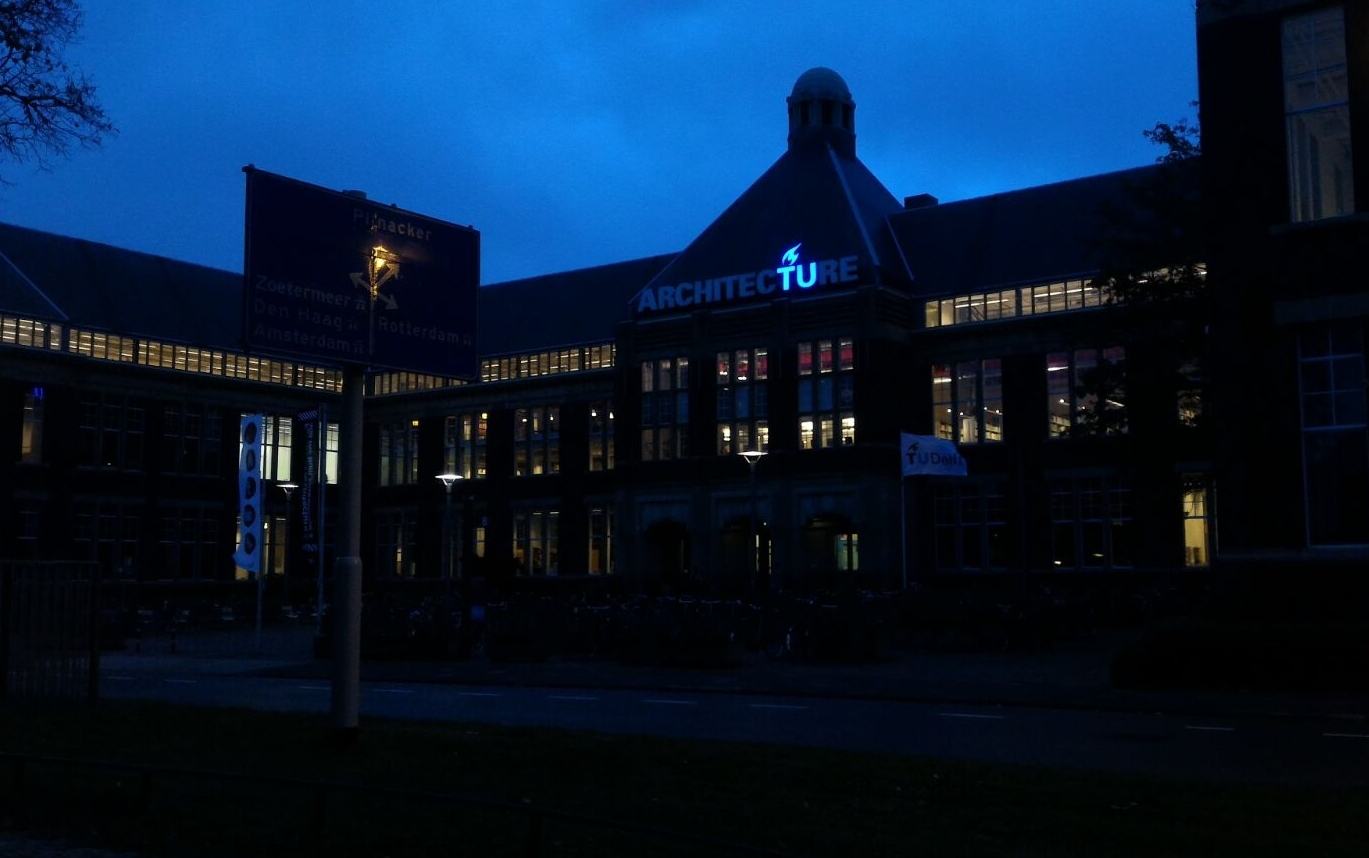
Front side of the building at night

The Faculty of Architecture and the Built Environment at TU Delft (Dutch: Faculteit Bouwkunde; abbr. BK ) is the largest faculty of TU Delft with around 2,900 students. It is also one of the top faculties in the world: it was ranked 2nd in the world's top universities for architecture & built environment in the QS World University Rankings by Subject 2020, following the Massachusetts Institute of Technology (MIT), and 3rd in 2015, 2017, 2018, and 2019.. Since 1 January 2026 TU Delft Hortus Botanicus became part of the Faculty as a 'living lab' which will operate across departments within the Faculty and other groups across TU Delft.

== History ==
On January 8, 1842, King Willem II founded the 'Royal Academy for the education of civilian engineers, for serving both nation and industry, and of apprentices for trade'. On June 20, 1864, a Royal Decree was issued, ordering that the Royal Academy in Delft be disbanded in order to make way for a new 'Polytechnic School'. The School went on to educate architects, and engineers in the fields of civil works, shipbuilding, mechanical engineering and mining. STYLOS, the Student Association for architectural students in the faculty, was established in 1894 and is one of the biggest in the Netherlands.

== Building ==
In 2008, the faculty of Architecture almost completely burned down in a fire. The current building is TU Delft's former main building.

=== Chair collection ===
The faculty is home to a famous chair collection. It was originally housed in the old building and it narrowly escaped destruction in the fire in which that building burned down. Having so narrowly escaped the fire, the value of the collection became much more apparent. The free-to-enter museum showcasing a large collection of chairs throughout history, is currently housed as a permanent exhibit in the new faculty building.

== Courses ==
The Faculty offers the following degrees:

- Bachelor of Science in Architecture
- Master of Science in Architecture, Urbanism and Building Sciences
- Master of Science in Geomatics for the Built Environment
- Master in Architecture with specialisations in: Architectural Design Crossovers, Architectural Engineering, Architecture and Dwelling, Architecture and Public Building, Borders and Territories, Complex Projects, Heritage and Architecture, Interiors Buildings Cities, Methods of Analysis and Imagination, Urban Architecture, City of the Future, Explore Lab, Veldacademie
- Master in Urbanism with specialisations in Planning complex cities, Transitional territories, Design of urban fabrics, Urban metabolism & climate and Urban ecology & Eco-cities.
- Master in Building Technology with specialisations in Climate, Facade and Structural Design
- Master in Management of the Built Environment (MBE) with specialisations in Design & Construction Management, Real Estate Management, and Housing
- Master in Landscape Architecture
- PhD in Architecture and the Built Environment
- The Berlage Post-master Program in Architecture and Urban Design

== The Berlage Center for Advanced Studies in Architecture and Urban Design ==
The Berlage Center for Advanced Studies in Architecture and Urban Design, commonly referred to as The Berlage, is an advanced postgraduate institution based at the Department of Architecture, Faculty of Architecture and the Built Environment, Delft University of Technology, in Delft, the Netherlands. Founded in 1990 as the Berlage Institute in Amsterdam, it operated as an independent, unaccredited school of architecture with an international student body and faculty, later relocating to Rotterdam. In 2012, it was re-established at TU Delft becoming an accredited program offering a post-master degree. Named after the Dutch architect Hendrik Petrus Berlage, the center has maintained continuity in its pedagogical approach while adapting to new academic and cultural contexts, with a focus on cross-cultural research, experimental design, and critical discourse.

The Berlage Post-Master in Architecture and Urban Design is an 18-month, full-time program offered through the center, awarding a Master of Science in Architecture and Urban Design accredited by the Dutch-Flemish Accreditation Organisation (NVAO). Taught in English, it is intended for architects and urban designers who have already completed a master’s degree or an equivalent qualification.

The program emphasizes innovative approaches to architectural and urban practice, integrated thinking across cultural, social, economic, and spatial dimensions, and experimental methods of design and research. Students engage in collaborative studios, research- and design-based projects, seminars, fieldwork, and masterclasses, guided by an international body of visiting scholars and designers, with a public program of lectures and events complementing the curriculum.

Some notable alumni include Mika Cimolini, Pier Vittorio Aureli, Reinier de Graaf, Ana Dzokic, Vasa J. Perović, Bas Princen, Miguel Robles-Durán, Daan Roosegaarde, and Martino Tattara.

== INDESEM ==
INDESEM (International Design Seminar) is a student-led workshop that has been organised more than 20 times at the Faculty in Delft. The first edition happened in 1964, when Dutch architect Aldo van Eyck was appointed professor. After another edition in 1967, the seminar wasn't held until Herman Hertzberger re-initiated it in 1985. Ever since, it was organised biennially or annually.

The most recent edition was held in 2023 and was called 'Boundaries' and invited students to think about the mental, physical and social boundaries they encounter.

== BkBeats ==
BkBeats started in 1972 when it was called 'Bouwkundefeest' and was hosted at the faculty then also, however back then it was the old faculty which burned down in 2008. Since then it is hosted in the new faculty building. It is the largest student festival hosted in an educational faculty in the Netherlands. It is hosted biennially, and organised by STYLOS, one of the faculties student organisations. The festival is so popular that it has been sold out many consecutive editions to date. As of the 2018 edition of the event, regular tickets cost 16 euro. For the festival the faculty is rebuilt from the inside and the festival takes place inside the faculty building.

== People ==
The following are associated with the Faculty.

=== Notable graduates ===
- Aldo van Eyck, Dutch architect
- Jo van den Broek
- Erick van Egeraat
- Lex Haak
- Herman Hertzberger
- Kas Oosterhuis
- Francine Houben
- Winy Maas, Jacob van Rijs and Nathalie de Vries (MVRDV)
- Frits Peutz
- Ben van Berkel, Dutch architect, (UNStudio)

=== Notable faculty ===
- Jacob B. Bakema, Dutch architect
- Jo Coenen, Dutch architect
- Cornelis van Eesteren, Dutch architect and urban planner
- Tony Fretton, British architect
- Herman Hertzberger, Dutch architect
- Rem Koolhaas, Dutch architect
- Marinus Jan Granpré Molière, Dutch urban designer and planner
- Kas Oosterhuis, Dutch architect
- Bob Van Reeth, Belgian architect
- Alexander Tzonis, Greek architect, researcher, and author
- Kees Kaan, Dutch architect
- Alex de Rijke, British architect
- Carlo Ratti, Italian architect and engineer
- Marina Tabassum, Bangladeshi architect
- Anne Lacaton, French architect, (Lacaton & Vassal)
- Yoshiharu Tsukamoto and Momoyo Kaijima of Atelier Bow-Wow, Japanese Architects

== Student organisations ==
With a large international student presence, there are various specialist associations linked to the Faculty of Architecture and the Built Environment. These include a study association for students and an alumni association, as well as several active practical associations.

- Stylos: Established in 1894, the Architecture study association has more than 2,100 members and around 100 active committee members.
- Argus: The Architecture master Student Association of the Faculty of Architecture at Delft University of Technology
- Polis: Platform for Urbanism and Landscape Architecture is the study association for Master students of the Faculty of Architecture specialising in urbanism and landscape architecture
- BOSS: Building Organisation Student Society. The student association linked to the department of Management in the Built Environment (MBE). It was established in 1993 at the faculty of Architecture
- BouT: the student and practice association for Building Technology of the Faculty of Architecture
- Forum: Forum Housing Association is an association which aims to stimulate discussion about living and housing as part of the Real Estate and Housing specialization
- GEOS: Study association of the M.Sc Geomatics Programme.
- INDESEM: organises the International Design Seminar and other events about Architecture related topics, approximately every two years
