= Kim Zwarts =

Dutch photographer

Kim Zwarts (Maastricht, 1955) is a Dutch photographer.

Kim Zwarts studied at the Maastricht Academy of Fine Arts. He has worked as a photographer on several architecture books, including monographs of Thom Mayne/Morphosis, Luis Barrágan, Wim Quist, Antonio Gaudi, Alvar Aalto, Charles Vandenhove, Wiel Arets, Dom H. van der Laan and Gerrit Rietveld. Zwarts has realized art commissions for Royal Sphinx, Mercedes-Benz, Limburg Water (WML) and Maastricht University.

Study grants from the Netherlands Foundation for Fine Arts, Design and Architecture in 1990 and again in 1999/2000 enabled him to conduct photographic research. On both occasions he spent extended periods in the United States.

Zwarts’ freelance work has appeared in Pale Pink (1994), Beyond (1997) and Maastricht 148 (2000). Exhibitions of his work have been held in, among others, the Bonnefanten Museum in Maastricht, Centre Céramique in Maastricht, at the Liège Photo Biennale, the Centraal Museum in Utrecht, the Netherlands Photo Museum, the Berlage Institute in Amsterdam, the Architectural Association School of Architecture in London, and the Maly Manezh Gallery in Moscow. In 2001 Zwarts designed a facade motif for the glass and concrete walls of the Utrecht University Library in the Netherlands.

Kim Zwarts’ work has received national and international recognition in the form of the Kodak Award (1989) and the Werner Mantz Prize (1997). His work has been included in several public and private art collections.

In several of his work, for example Maastricht 148, Kim Zwarts selected the subjects of his pictures by drawing a grid over a specific area. The crossing points on the grid appear in the pictures.

== Bibliography ==
- K. Zwarts, Beyond, Maastricht 1997
- K. Zwarts, Maastricht 148, Maastricht 2000
- K. Zwarts, Pale Pink, Maastricht 1994
