= Mimica =

Mimica may refer to:

- Vatroslav Mimica (1923–2020), Croatian film director and screenwriter
- Eugenio Mimica Barassi (1949–2021), Chilean writer
- Neven Mimica (born 1953), Croatian politician and diplomat
- Vedran Mimica (born 1954), Croatian architect
- Sergio Mimica-Gezzan (born 1956), Croatian film and television director
- Mimica Pavlović (born 1984), Serbian football defender
- Mimica (footballer) (born 1985), Brazilian football centre-back
- Mimica – genus of red algae in the Solieriaceae family
