= Oris (magazine) =

Croatian architecture magazine

Oris is a Croatian architecture magazine. The publisher describes it as a 'Magazine for Architecture and Culture'.

== Overview ==
Oris has appeared bi-monthly since 1998 and covers the media space of Croatia, Slovenia and Bosnia and Herzegovina.

The magazine is published in Slovenian/English and Croatian/English editions., with topics covering the entire range of architecture. The magazine introduces an international cross-section of projects with an emphasis on works from the region. In addition to architecture, a separate section covers topics on art in general, such as photography or event-art, often with illustrations of connections with the conventional understanding of the term "architecture". Advertising is concentrated in a section on the beginning of every issue, so as not to disturb the flow of reading.

The publisher has been Arhitekst since 1999. The company also organises the annual 'Oris-days' – two-day symposiums with lectures by architects from all over the world. These are very popular among the architects of the region, as they are recognized for the further training required by the Croatian architectural association. It is also a rare chance to meet colleagues from around the country.

== Publications ==
- Randić & Turato "The Architecture of Transition"
- Contemporary Croatian Architecture: Testing Reality

== Selected authors ==
Vedran Mimica, Boris Podrecca, Tonči Žarnić, Ana Dana Beroš, Miranda Veljačić
