= Alessandra Cianchetta =

Italian architect, urban planner and author

- Education: La Sapienza; Polytechnic University of Catalonia
- Occupations: Architecture, Design, Strategy, Visual Arts
- Awards: French Ministry of Culture NAJAP Award, French Ministry of Ecology, Sustainability, Transport and Housing PJU urban planning award. Mies Van Der Rohe European Award for Architecture (nominations)
- Practice: AWP AWILDC London - New York (formerly AWP Paris)
- Buildings: La Défense

Alessandra Cianchetta is an Italian architect, designer, curator, urban strategist and author. Cianchetta is the founder and director of AWP AWILDC. She formerly co-founded AWP France of which she is currently shareholder. Her achievements include a masterplan for developing an area of 161 hectares (400 acres) in Paris's La Défense business district.

== Biography ==
Initially interested in fashion, Cianchetta was persuaded by the fashion designer Emilio Pucci to turn to architecture.

She studied architecture at La Sapienza, Rome, and went on to earn a master's degree at the Polytechnic University of Catalonia, Barcelona. She also pursued advanced studies in landscape architecture at the School for Advanced Studies in the Social Sciences, Paris, in 2002 and entrepreneurship and finance at the HBSX online Harvard Business School in 2022.

Her activities cover a wide variety of projects in the area of urban design and planning, including landscape design, pavilions and interiors. She is particularly interested in the effects of landscape, light, climate and art on the urban environment. In addition to her plans for La Défense, she has designed Poissy Galore, a series of public buildings and follies projects in a Paris park. Constructed of timber, her Lantern Pavilion in Sandnes, Norway, was nominated for the Mies van der Rohe Award in 2009. She has also designed and curated a number of exhibitions. The studio has been selected for the 17th International Architecture Exhibition of Venice Biennale of Architecture “ How will we live together?”(2021) with the on site installation FIELD OF LINES and with a film, DIE ALLMEND/THE COMMONS (as part of Olafur Eliasson/Studio Other Spaces’ exhibition Future Assembly). Cianchetta's built work is showcased in the exhibition GOOD NEWS / Women in Architecture at the MAXXI National Museum of the Arts of the XXI century, Rome, IT (2022). At the intersection of architecture and visual arts, her latest work is presented at Lofoten International Art Festival (LIAF) 2022, Arctic, NO.

Cianchetta has taken up educational assignments at Columbia University, New York, Carlton University, Ottawa, The Berlage in the Netherlands., Westminster University in London, Pratt Institute in New York City. Cianchetta has served as a professor at the Academy of Fine Arts Vienna and as Professor Adjunct at The Cooper Union in New York City and at Cornell University in Ithaca, New York.

== Awards ==
Cianchetta has received a number of awards including:

- 2006: French Ministry of Culture Prize for Best Young Architect
- 2010: French Ministry of Ecology, Sustainability, Transport and Housing PJU urban planning award

== Selected publications ==
- Cianchetta, Alessandra; Molteni, Enrico (2004). Álvaro Siza: private houses, 1954-2004. Skira. ISBN 9788884914194.
- Armengaud, Marc; Armengaud, Mathias; Cianchetta, Alessandra (2012). Nightscapes : nocturnal landscapes. Editorial Gustavo Gili. ISBN 978-8425221385.
