= Frausto =

Frausto is a surname. Notable people with the surname include:

- Alejandra Frausto Guerrero, Mexican cultural director
- Alfredo Frausto (born 1983), Mexican footballer
- Antonio R. Frausto (1897–1954), Mexican actor
- Federico Bernal Frausto (born 1953), Mexican politician
- João J. R. Fraústo da Silva (1933–2022), Portuguese chemist
- Salomon Frausto, American architectural theorist
- Stephanie Frausto (born 1990), American mixed martial artist
- Zoila Frausto Gurgel (born 1983), American mixed martial artist
