= Hoge Heren =

Coordinates: 51°54′41.09″N 4°28′51.32″E

The Hoge Heren
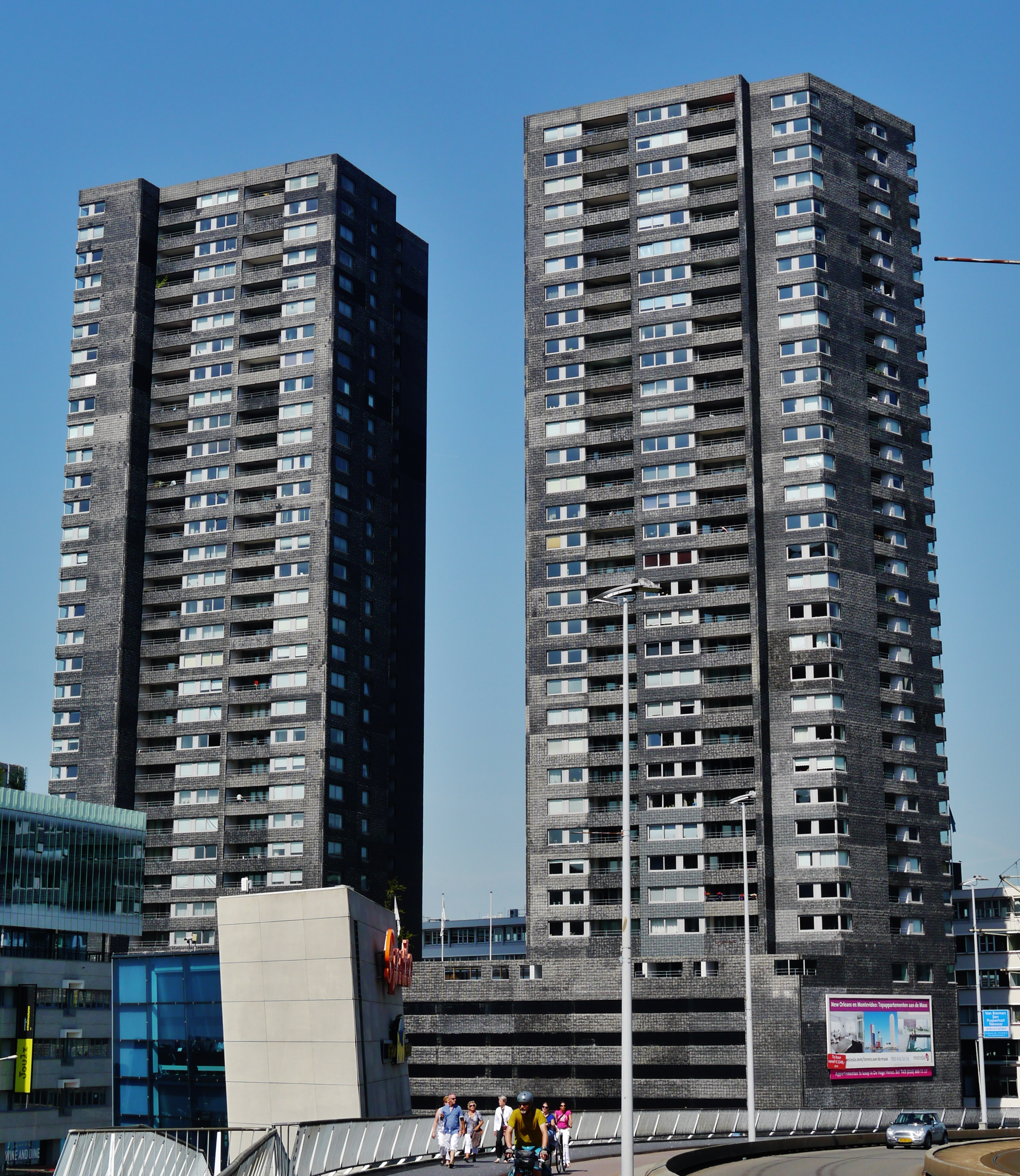

General information
- Status: Completed
- Type: Housing
- Location: Rotterdam, Netherlands
- Opening: 2000
- Height: 102 m (335 ft)

Technical details
- Floor count: 34

Design and construction
- Architect(s): Wiel Arets

The Hoge Heren (English: High Gentlemen) is hybrid complex composed of two towers in the center of Rotterdam designed by Wiel Arets, located in the former Zalmhaven of the city near the Erasmusbrug. The building was completed in 2000. The complex is 102 meters high and has 34 floors.
