= Wiel Arets =

Dutch architect

- Born: 6 May 1955 (age 71); Heerlen, Netherlands
- Education: TU Eindhoven
- Occupation: Architect
- Practice: Wiel Arets Architects
- Buildings: Maastricht Academy of Art and Architecture; Euroborg Stadium; The Hoge Heren; Utrecht University Library

Wiel Arets (Dutch pronunciation: [ˈʋil ˈaːrəts], born 6 May 1955) is a Dutch architect, architectural theorist, urbanist, industrial designer and the former dean of the college of architecture at the Illinois Institute of Technology in Chicago. Arets was previously the 'Professor of Building Planning and Design' at the Berlin University of the Arts (UdK), Germany, and studied at the Technical University of Eindhoven, graduating in 1983. The same year later he founded Wiel Arets Architects, a multidisciplinary architecture and design studio, today with studios in Amsterdam, Maastricht, Munich, and Zürich. From 1995 to 2002 he was the dean of the Berlage Institute in Rotterdam, where he introduced the idea of 'progressive-research' and co-founded the school's architectural journal named HUNCH.

== Life and career ==
Wiel Arets was born on 6 May 1955 in Heerlen, Netherlands, to Wiel Arets (1929) and Mia Heuts (1931). His father was a book printer and his mother was a fashion designer, both from whom he learned respect for the tradition of craft and a love of books and reading. He briefly studied engineering, and then physics, before ultimately deciding on architecture. He divides his time between Chicago, Maastricht, Berlin, Amsterdam and Zürich, living and working in each city. He is married and has two children. Arets' work is generally characterized by a minimalist, geometric and austere approach that responds to local contingencies in a flexible way, with Arets explaining:

'We want our buildings to fit into the existing context, yet remain flexible and open to change'.

During his studies at the Technical University of Eindhoven (TU/e) Arets became fascinated by the works and words of Paul Valéry, Giorgio Grassi and Cesare Cattaneo, quickly developing his admiration for 'the dialogue' as an operative method, best exemplified by Valéry's 'Eupalinos' and Cattaneo's 'Giovanni e Giuseppe'. While studying Arets co-founded the architectural journal Wiederhall and organized a series of visiting lecturers at the TU/e that included the architects Zaha Hadid, Tadao Ando and Peter Eisenmann, among others. Subsequently, Arets organized the first European exhibition of Tadao Ando's work. It was during this period that Arets 'rediscovered' the work of Dutch architect Frits Peutz, who transformed the city of Heerlen from an industrial coal mining hub and into a modern city through his many built commissions funded by the coal industry, most recognizably the Glaspaleis. With the decline of industry the city lost most of its status as an industrial area in Limburg and Frits Peutz faded from architectural prominence.

As a student Arets undertook extensive research in the archives of Peutz's office, eventually producing the monograph 'F.P.J Peutz Architekt 1916–1966' (1981) and an accompanying traveling exhibition. After graduating from the TU/e in 1983 Arets travelled extensively throughout Russia, the United States and Japan. While in Japan Arets visited and interviewed several prominent architects including Fumihiko Maki, Kazuo Shinohara, Itsuko Hasegawa and Tadao Ando, later publishing these interviews and articles in the Dutch architecture magazine de Architect. Arets first garnered international architectural attention with the completion of the Maastricht Academy of Art and Architecture in 1993, described by Kenneth Frampton as:

'Revitalizing an existing institution within the old urban core in such a way as to transform both the institution and the urban fabric...All of this was achieved without abandoning for the moment the minimalist expression of an architecture degree zero, derived in part from Sol LeWitt and in part from Tadao Ando.'

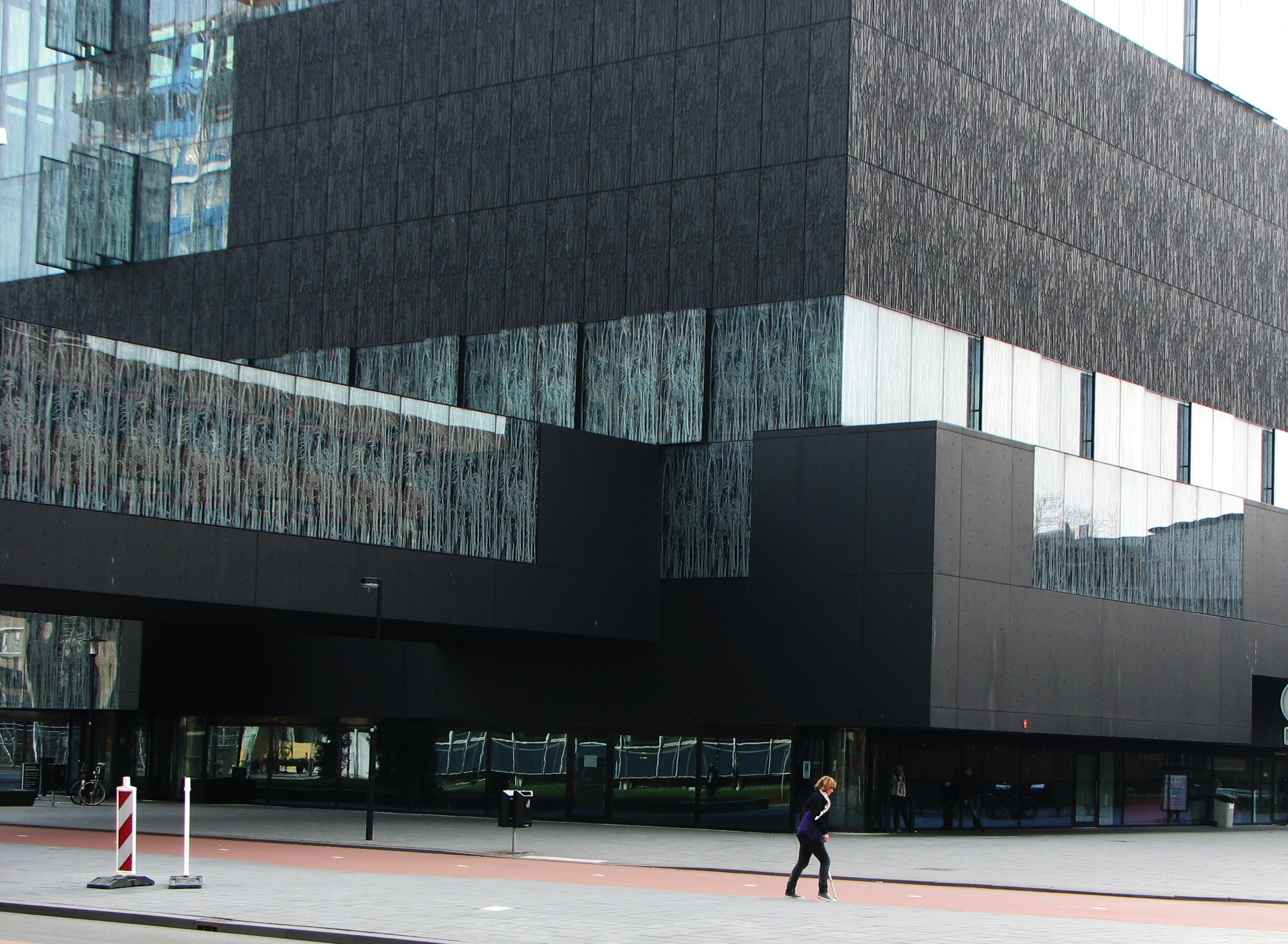
Utrecht University Library

In 2004 Arets completed the library of Utrecht University, situated in the Uithof area of the campus designed by OMA which dictated a strict orthogonal requirement for all buildings. The library's exterior glazing is screen printed with an image of bamboo shoots created by the photographer Kim Zwarts, returning as a tactile imprinted surface pattern on the library's interior prefabricated concrete panel walls, which are painted black. This 'tactility' has since returned to more of Arets' projects in the form of imprinted-concrete or screen printed glass exteriors. Kazuyo Sejima of SANAA remarks of the library:

'The building is fascinating in many ways, but most of all I feel some warm humanism from it. Within its crisp black envelope Wiel Arets has carved out an arsenal of different spaces – some low, some high, some wide, some spacious, some compressed, some bright, some dark. This is a building that would never appear dull. It offers a moment for everyone.'

In 2011 Arets' studio won an international competition to design the IJhal at Amsterdam Centraal Station, part of the city's plan to revitalize the waterfront by reconnecting it to the river IJ., and recently finished construction on the Allianz Headquarters in Zürich, Switzerland.

== Theoretical position ==
In 1991 Arets published his first theoretical text, 'An Alabaster Skin', in a monograph of the same title. The text merged Arets' fascinations of his studies and early career, including: cinematography, photography, the 'city', technology of the 20th century, the membrane or skin of a building, biology and the act of cutting and editing (in regards to cinematography), as well as the Postmodern architecture of the 1980s. Greg Lynn interprets the piece as so:

'A precedent for this alabaster urbanism is Skidmore Owings and Merrill’s Beinecke Rare Book Library at Yale University that utilizes an alabaster curtain wall that breaks down the boundary between the interior and exterior without transparency. Light is admitted from the outside during the day and the interior emanates a glowing light at night. The polished surface of the blank curtain wall reflects the adjacent buildings while allowing permeability. Likewise, in Arets’ work there is the stealth of a chameleon.'

== Teaching ==
Arets was dean of the Berlage Institute from 1995 to 2002 where he changed the school to a research based institute focusing on 'progressive-research', public lectures, publications, field trips, and intensive debates. Prior to that position he was and is a professor or guest professor at many architecture schools, mostly within Europe and the United States, and was until 2012 the 'Professor of Building Planning and Design' at the Berlin University of the Arts (UdK), Germany. While at the UdK 'Tokyo Utopia/TOUT', was Arets' research theme, and he has previously used other research themes, such 'Double Dutch', to structure output and debate while teaching; they often return to give content and context to publications such as HUNCH. Of the importance of such a 'progressive-research' based theme Arets states:

'That's why, when I became Dean, I changed the name to the Berlage Institute Laboratory for Architecture, I wanted to invite people to come do their research alongside students and to publish their work with the studios. The research, the production of the students, the publication, the seminars, the field trips, the lectures that were happening – all had to be part of one thing. I think laboratory simply means you have a theme, and you collectively do investigations and research. And then, at the end of the year, you have a result, which is presented in the school's publication, HUNCH, which was originally edited by Jennifer Sigler. This was, and still is, not just a publication of only student work; rather, HUNCH was where we also published the work of guest lecturers, the important research of the trips, and everything we thought belonged to the year theme.'

== Academic positions ==
- 1986–1989 Architectural Academies of Amsterdam and Rotterdam, Netherlands
- 1988–1992 Architectural Association, London, United Kingdom
- 1991–1994 Visiting professor at Cooper Union, New York City, United States
- 1991–1994 Visiting professor at Columbia University, United States
- 1994 Guest Professor at the Royal Danish Academy of Fine Arts, Copenhagen, Denmark
- 1995–2002 Dean of the Berlage Institute, Rotterdam, Netherlands
- 2005–2012 Professor at the Berlin University of the Arts, Berlin, Germany
- 2005 Guest Professor at the RWTH Aachen University, Aachen, Germany
- 2006–2012 Guest Professor at Universidad Politécnica de Madrid, Madrid, Spain
- 2010 Ruth and Norman Moore Visiting professor at Washington University in St. Louis, St. Louis, United States
- 2012–2017 Dean of the College of Architecture at the Illinois Institute of Technology, Chicago, United States

== Quotes ==
- "Architecture is therefore a between, a membrane, an alabaster skin, a thing that is at once opaque and transparent... It can only become part of the world by entering into a marriage with its surroundings."
- On his line of Dot bathroom fittings for Alessi: "We were very clear that we didn’t want to do something fashionable, we wanted it to still look new in ten years." — Wallpaper*, 2007
- On his idea of the emerging global metropolis: "To understand the world we are living in at this moment, we have to redefine the 'Map of the world', a mental construct which at least since 1492 has undergone many reinperpretations. We could read the world anno 2020 as a collective living space for us all, in which all the continents are in reach within 288 minutes, and the maximum travel distance at each continent will be 72 minutes, the time in which every city on each continent will be able to be reached."
- "Sometimes in spring there are beautiful trees that bloom, and suddenly, there are white blossoms everywhere. You don't look at one particular spot. And I personally think that's also true in architecture."

== Wiel Arets Architects ==
Wiel Arets Architects
- Type: Private
- Industry: Architecture, Industrial Design, Urbanism
- Founded: 1983
- Headquarters: Amsterdam, Netherlands
- Number of locations: 4: Amsterdam, Maastricht, Munich, Zürich
- Key people: Wiel Arets
- Number of employees: 20
- Website: WAA

=== Notable projects ===
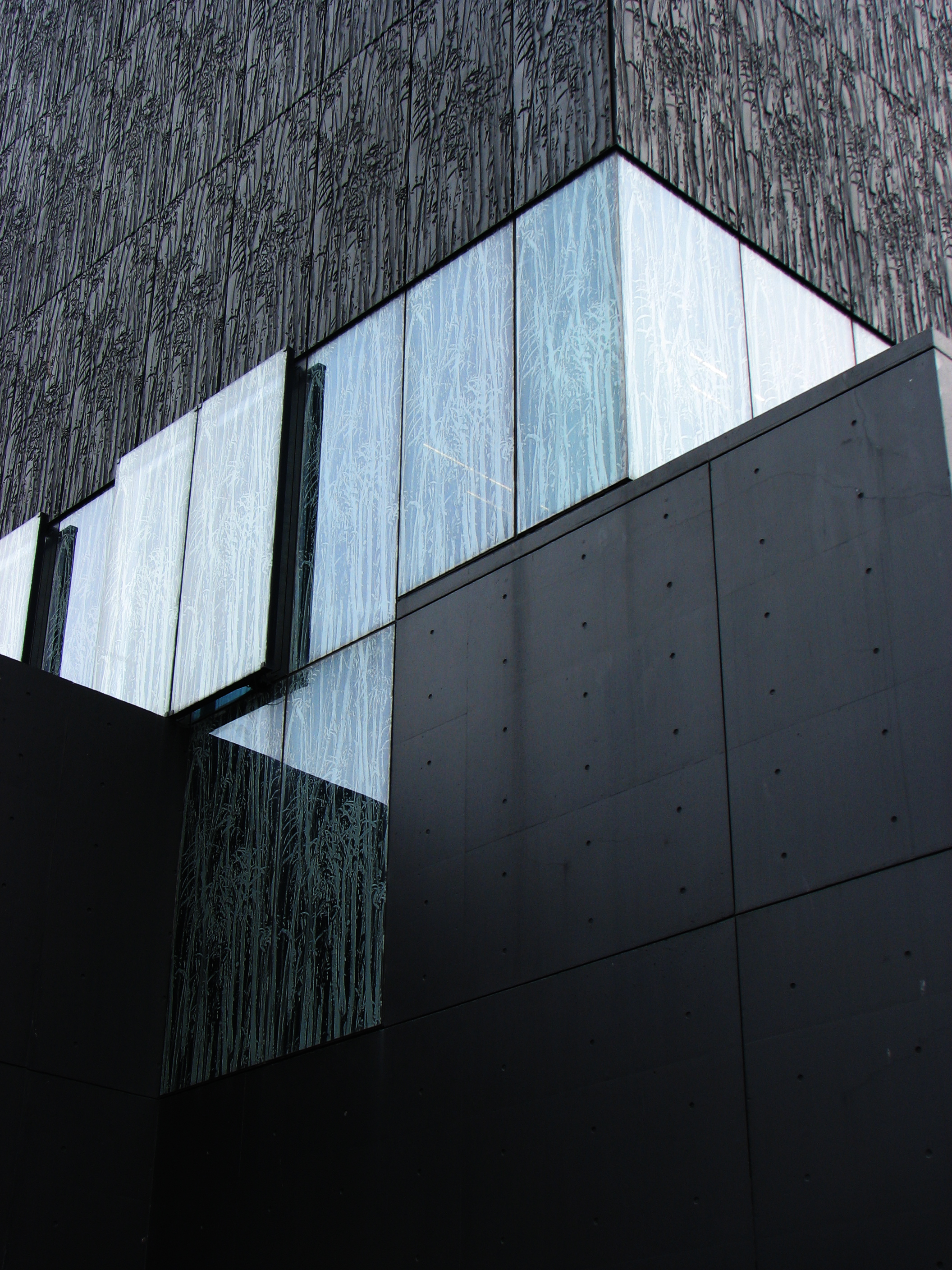
Utrecht University Library

- Fashion Shop Beltgens, (Maastricht, 1986–1987)
- Maastricht Academy of Art and Architecture, (Maastricht, 1989–1993)
- AZL Pension Fund Headquarters, (Heerlen, 1990–1995)
- KNSM Island Apartment Tower, (Amsterdam, 1990–1996)
- Police Station, (Vaals, 1993–1995)
- Tower Hoge Heren, (Rotterdam, 1993–2001)
- Police Station, (Cuijk, 1994–1997)
- Lensvelt Factory & Office, (Breda, 1995–1998)
- University Library, (Utrecht, 1997–2004)
- Hedge House (Wijlre, 1998–2001)
- Sport Campus Leidsche Rijn, (Utrecht, 1998–2006)
- Kwakkel Office & Showroom, (Apeldoorn, 1999–2002)
- Glaspaleis, (Heerlen, 1999–2003)
- E' Tower, (Eindhoven, 2000–2013)
- Housing Kloostertuin, (Apeldoorn, 2000–2006)
- B' Tower, (Rotterdam, 2000–2013)
- Tea & Coffee Towers, (Limited Edition for Alessi, 2001–2003)
- Four Towers Osdorp, (Amsterdam, 2002–2008)
- Living Madrid, (Madrid, 2002–2008)
- Gallery Borzo, (Amsterdam, 2004–2006)
- Euroborg Stadium, (Groningen, 2004–2006)
- Il Bagno dOt Alessi, (Alessi, 2004–2007)
- H' House, (Maastricht, 2005–2009)
- V' Tower, (Eindhoven, 2006–2009)
- Hotel Zenden, (Maastricht, 2006–2009)
- V' House, (Maastricht, 2006–2013)
- A' House, (Tokyo, Japan, 2007–2014)
- Campus Hoogvliet, (Rotterdam, 2007–2014)
- The Post, (Maastricht, 2008–2013)
- Regiocentrale Zuid, (Maasbracht, 2008–2014)
- Truman Plaza, (Berlin, 2008–2014)
- Schwäbisch Media, (Ravensburg, 2008–2013)
- Allianz Headquarters, (Richti Wallisellen, Zürich, 2008–2014)
- The Double, (Amsterdam, 2010–2019)
- The IJhal (Amsterdam Centraal Station, Amsterdam, 2010–2016)
- AvB Tower, (The Hague, 2010–2013)
- Blumenhaus, (Zürich, 2011–2019)
- Europaallee 'Site D', (Zürich, 2012–2019)
- Van der Valk Hotel, (Amsterdam, 2014–2020)
- 'Am Hirschgarten', (Munich, 2014–2020)
- Antwerp Tower, (Antwerp, 2017–2020)
- Bahrain Bay Tower, (Manama, Bahrain, 2015–2022)

== Awards ==
- Victor de Stuers Award (1987)
- Charlotte Köhler Award (1988)
- Rotterdam Maaskant Award (1989)
- Best Dutch Book Design Award 1989: Wiel Arets Architect (1989)
- Victor de Stuers Award (1994)
- Mies van der Rohe Award for European Architecture: Special Mention Emerging Architect (1994)
- BNA Kubus (2005)
- Best Dutch Book Design Award 2005: Living Library: Wiel Arets (2005)
- iF Product Design Award (2009)
- Good Design Award (2009)
- Amsterdam Architecture Prize (2010)
- ContractWorld Award (2011)
- Best Dutch Book Design Award (010): STILLS: A Timeline of Ideas, Articles & Interviews 1983–2010 (2011)
- Geurt Brinkgreve Bokaal Award (2011)
- Communication Arts Typography Annual Award (2012): STILLS: A Timeline of Ideas, Articles & Interviews 1982–2010
- D&AD Award (2014): NOWNESS: IIT Architecture 2013–2014
- The Chicago Athenaeum International Architecture Award (2014): Allianz Headquarters

== Bibliography ==
- Wiel Arets Architect (1989) ISBN 90-6450-090-8
- An Alabaster Skin (1992) ISBN 90-6450-118-1
- Maastricht Academy (1994) ISBN 90-6450-204-8
- Wiel Arets: Strange Bodies (1996) ISBN 3-7643-5411-9
- Wiel Arets: AZL Heerlen (1999) ISBN 90-6450-373-7
- The Hoge Heren (2002) ISBN 90-77059-02-4
- Wiel Arets: Live/Life (2002) ISBN 88-7940-186-6
- Wiel Arets: Works, Projects, Writings (2002) ISBN 978-1-56898-335-6
- Wiel Arets: Works & Projects (2004) ISBN 978-1-904313-26-7
- Living Library: Wiel Arets (2005) ISBN 978-3-7913-3455-4
- STILLS: A Timeline of Ideas, Articles and Interviews 1983–2010 (2010) ISBN 978-90-6450-764-9
- Wiel Arets: Autobiographical References (2012) ISBN 978-3-7913-3455-4
- TC Cuadernos nº 109/110- Wiel Arets Arquitectura 1997–2013, (2013) ISSN 1136-906X
- Wiel Arets. Inspiration and Process in Architecture, (2012) ISBN 978-88-6613-470-1
- NOWNESS: IIT Architecture Chicago 2013–2014, (2013) ISBN 978-09-8904-389-2
- Wiel Arets–Bas Princen, (2015) ISBN 9783775735056
- Ellen Kooi Above Rotterdam: One Glass Tower by Wiel Arets & Nine Situations by Katrien Van Den Brande, (2016) ISBN 9781945150227
- Crown Hall Design's Dialogues: 2012–2017, (2017) ISBN 9781945150500

== Films ==
- Architecture Film Festival Rotterdam 2011: 'Perspectives'
- Venice Biennale 2002: Arsenal International Exposition – 'Utrecht University Library'
- Venice Biennale 2002: Arsenal Internationale Exposition – 'Stadium, Haarlem'
- Venice Biennale 2002: 'The Europol, Hague Netherlands'
