= Claus en Kaan Architecten =

Dutch architectural firm

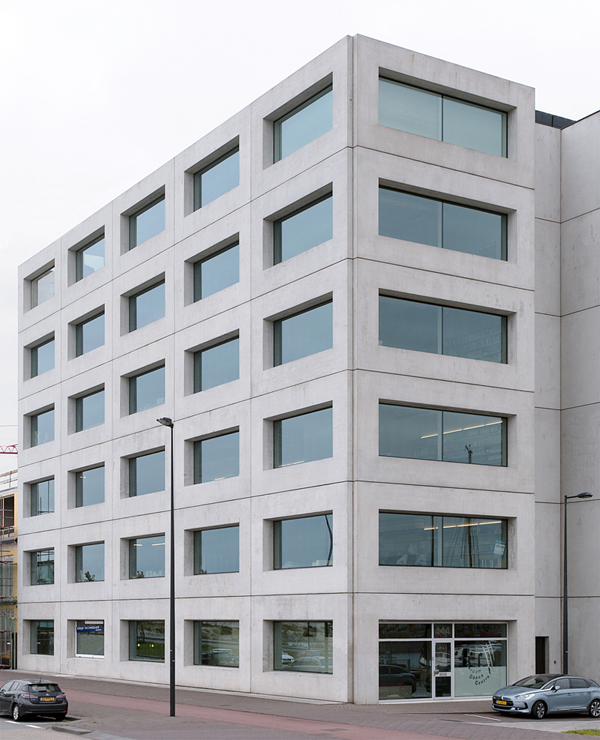
The former Claus en Kaan Office in Amsterdam, Netherlands, was designed by the firm

Claus en Kaan Architecten was a Dutch architecture firm founded in 1987 by Felix Claus and Kees Kaan, led together with partners Vincent Panhuysen and Dikkie Scipio.

== History ==
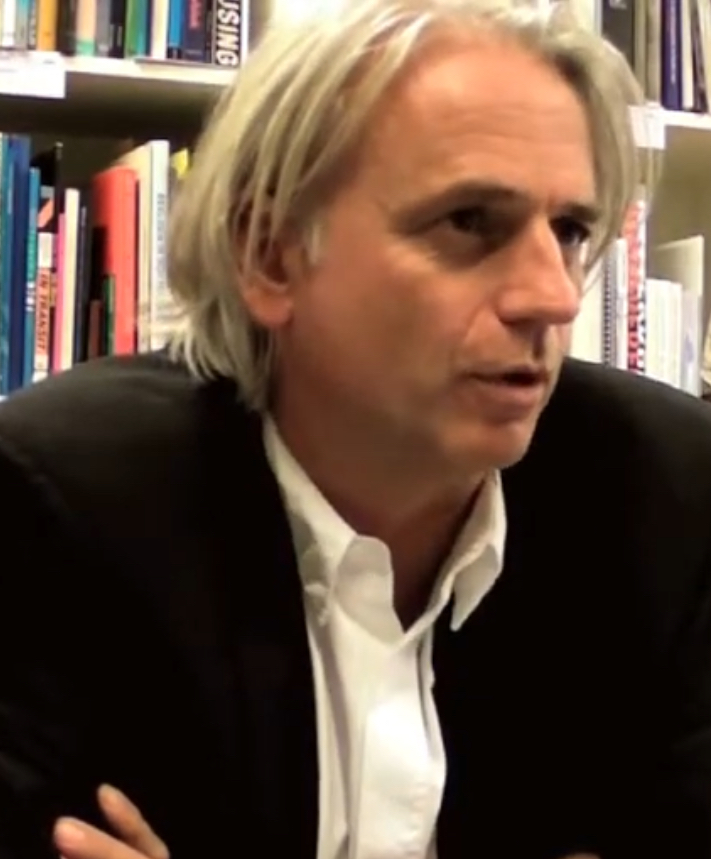
Founder Kees Kaan in 2011

Claus was born in 1956 in Arnheim and Kaan was born in Breda, in 1961. They both graduated from Delft University of Technology in 1987.

They formed the firm of Claus en Kaan Architecten in 1987.

Claus en Kaan designed the master plan of the IJburg district of Amsterdam and later moved their offices to a building they designed in the district.

Kees Kaan and Felix Claus once stated that their ambition was to extinguish the schism between low practice and high theory, between architecture that serves its immediate objective and architecture that speaks over the heads of its users to colleagues and critics.

On 15 January 2014, the company released a statement announcing the ending of the partnership between Claus and Kaan as from 1 January 2014. After such ending, Felix Claus started a partnership with Dick van Wageningen.

== Notable works ==
In 2004, opened the Dutch Embassy in Maputo, Mozambique. The building unites Dutch design and techniques with locally sourced materials and constraints, bringing the office spaces up to a European standard, whilst still taking into consideration history and the locality of the place. The Netherlands Architecture Institute publishers said of the building: "It is an exceptional building, designed to a Dutch vision yet constructed using African materials".

In 2008, Claus en Kaan completed a crematorium in the Belgian town of Sint-Niklaas, it won the 2009 Dutch National Concrete Award, the Betonprijs and was nominated for the ESCN award in 2010. Catherine Slessor, editor of the Architectural Review called it ‘a powerful statement, evoking timelessness, elementality, and a connection with nature’.

The firm designed the House of Culture and Administration in Nijverdal.

It has also designed "social housing" projects in Ypenburg, at The Hague Vinex-location under the MVRDV masterplan. The firm has completed an "upscale collection of boxy units" named Rietvelden, after the "Dutch modernist master" Gerrit Rietveld, in a suburban development in Ypenburg.

The firm also designed Mövenpick's 408-room hotel tower that opened in 2007 in Amsterdam's harbor area. The hotel has "a 20-story exterior striped in alternating bands of glass, white concrete and green granite — not unlike an enormous Popsicle."

== Selected works ==
- 2012–2014 -National Military Museum, Soesterberg, Netherlands
- 2012 – Supreme Court of the Netherlands, The Hague, Netherlands
- 2010 – Gedempte Zalmhaven, Rotterdam
- 2008–2012 – Central Judicial Collection Agency, Leeuwarden, Netherlands
- 2008–2009 -Dwelling Edmond Halleylaan, Amsterdam, Netherlands
- 2008 – El Prat de LLobregat, Barcelona, Spain
- 2007–2011 -Netherlands Institute of Ecology, Wageningen, Netherlands
- 2006–2009 -Central Post, Rotterdam
- 2006–2009 -Vancouver, Rotterdam
- 2006–2009 -Villa Trapman, Nieuwveen, Netherlands
- 2006–2011 -AM Headquarters, Utrecht, Netherlands
- 2005–2010 -Palace of Justice, Amsterdam
- 2005–2008 -Local Government Office, Amsterdam
- 2005–2007 -CK Office, Amsterdam
- 2004–2010 -District Water Board Brabantse Delta on Bouvigne Estate, Breda, Netherlands
- 2004–2008 -Apartments Eekenhof, Enschede, Netherlands
- 2004–2008 -Crematorium Heimolen, Sint Niklaas, Belgium
- 2004–2007 -Municipal Archives 'De Bazel', Amsterdam
- 2004–2006 -Academy of Architecture', Amsterdam

== Publications ==
- Berg J., Ibelings H., Claus en Kaan Architecten: Ideal Standard, Buildings 1988–2009, Amsterdam, Prototype Editions, 2009
- Forjaz J., Gaunt R., Ibelings H., Claus en Kaan Architecten. The Royal Netherlands Embassy in Mozambique, Rotterdam, NAi Publishers, 2005
- Costanzo M., Claus en Kaan. L’architettura dell’attenzione, Torino, Edilstampa, 2004
- Yamamoto R., Beauftragt: Claus en Kaan Architecten, Berlin, Aedes, 2002
- Ibelings H., Claus en Kaan. Building, Rotterdam/Beijing, NAi Publishers, 2001/2004
- Claus F., van Dongen F., Schaap T., IJburg. Haveneiland en Reitlanden: brief design plan, Rotterdam, 010 Publishers, 2001
- Claus en Kaan, Michel H., Richters C., Claus en Kaan, Amsterdam, ABC Architectuurcentrum Haarlem, 2001
- Ferrater C., Claus en Kaan. New generations in the Dutch tradition, Barcelona, Editorial Gustavo Gili, 1997

== Gallery ==
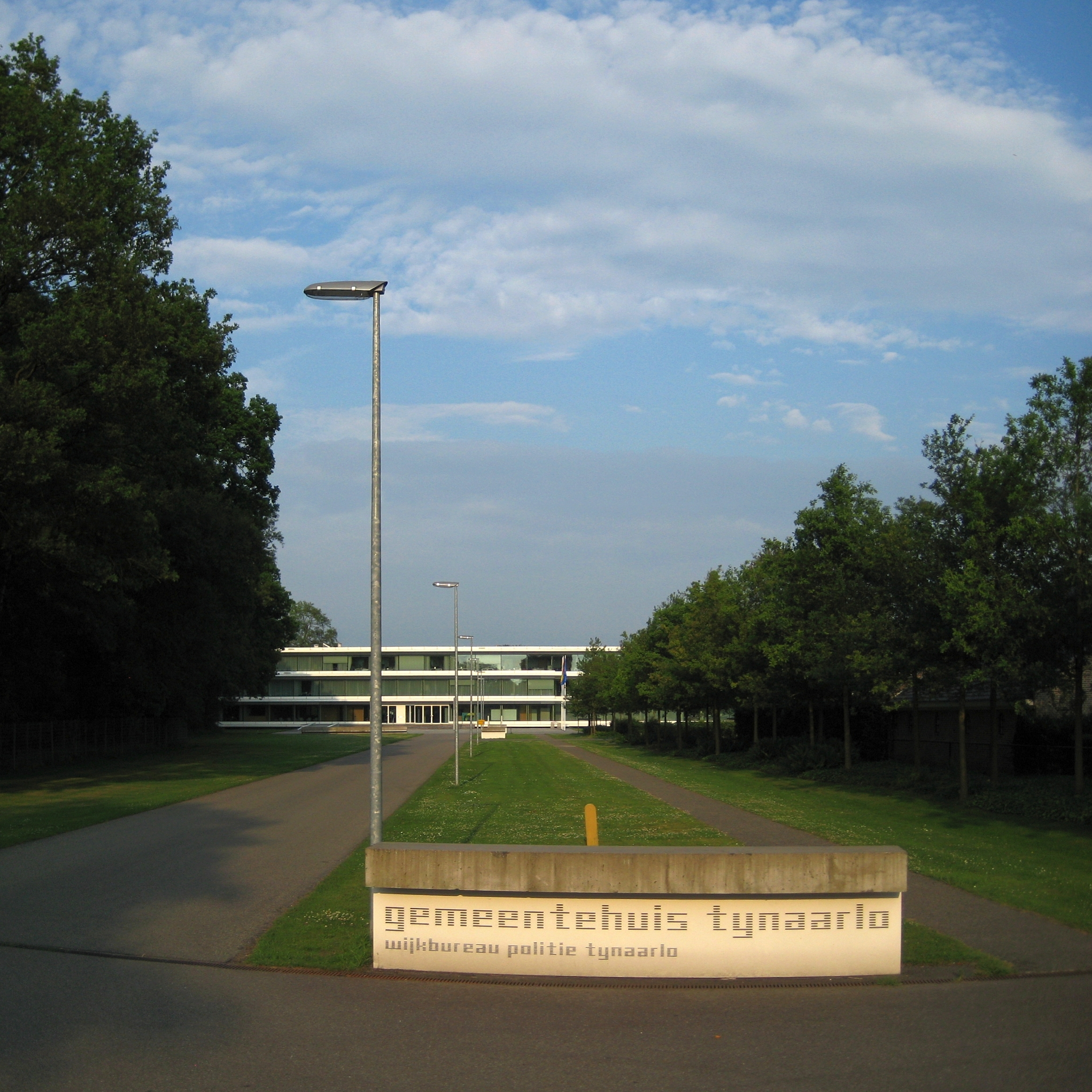
Town Hall Tynaarlo
Vries, Netherlands

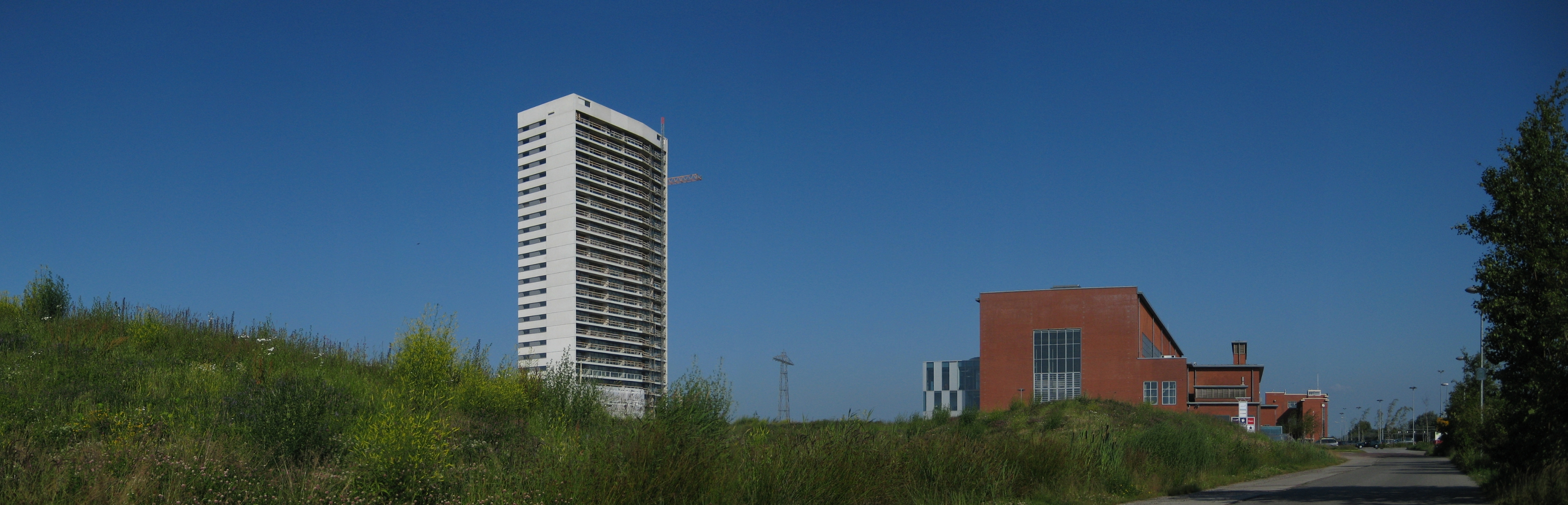
Euroborg
Groningen, Netherlands

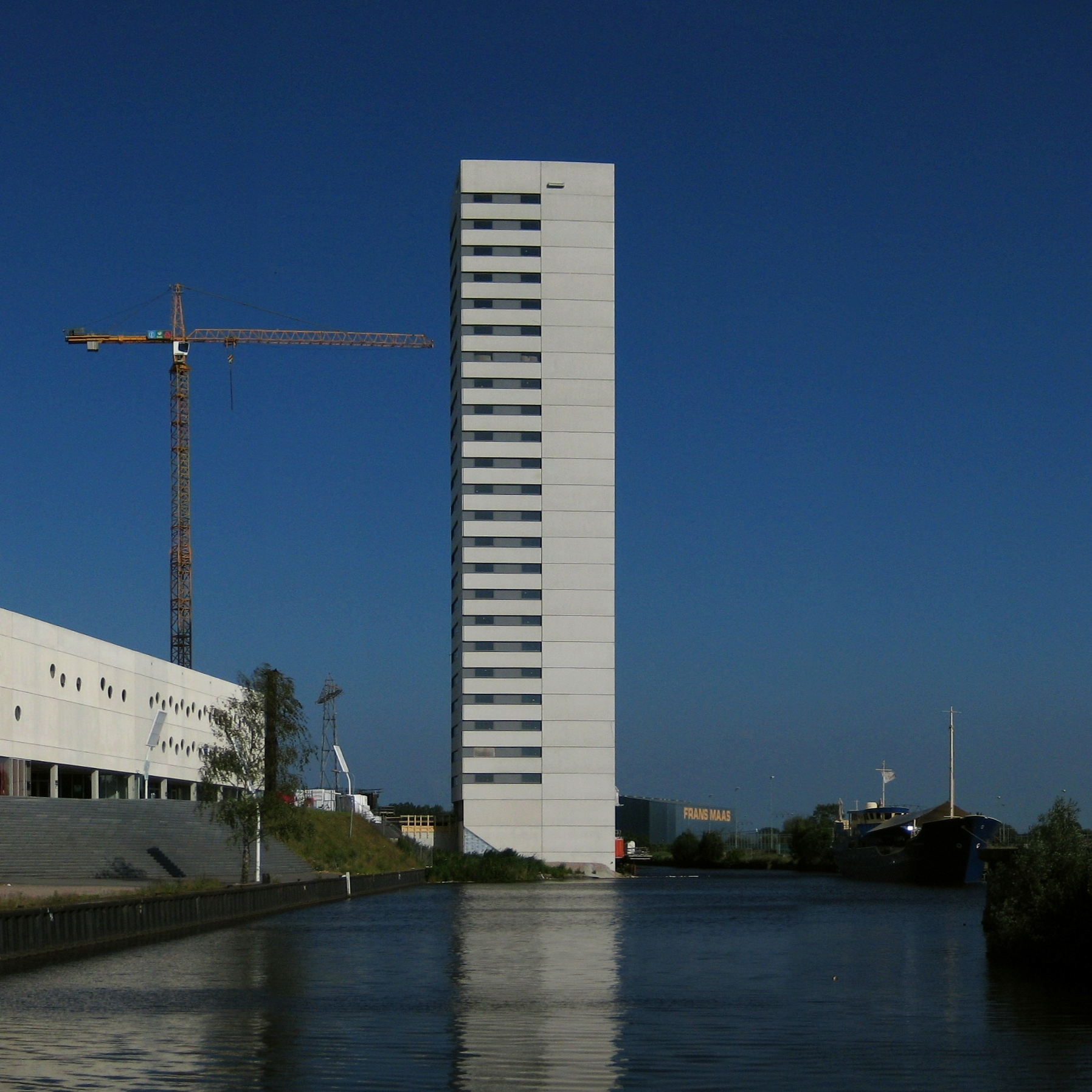
Euroborg
Groningen, Netherlands
