= Miranda Veljačić =

Croatian architect, researcher, cultural producer and editor (born 1976)

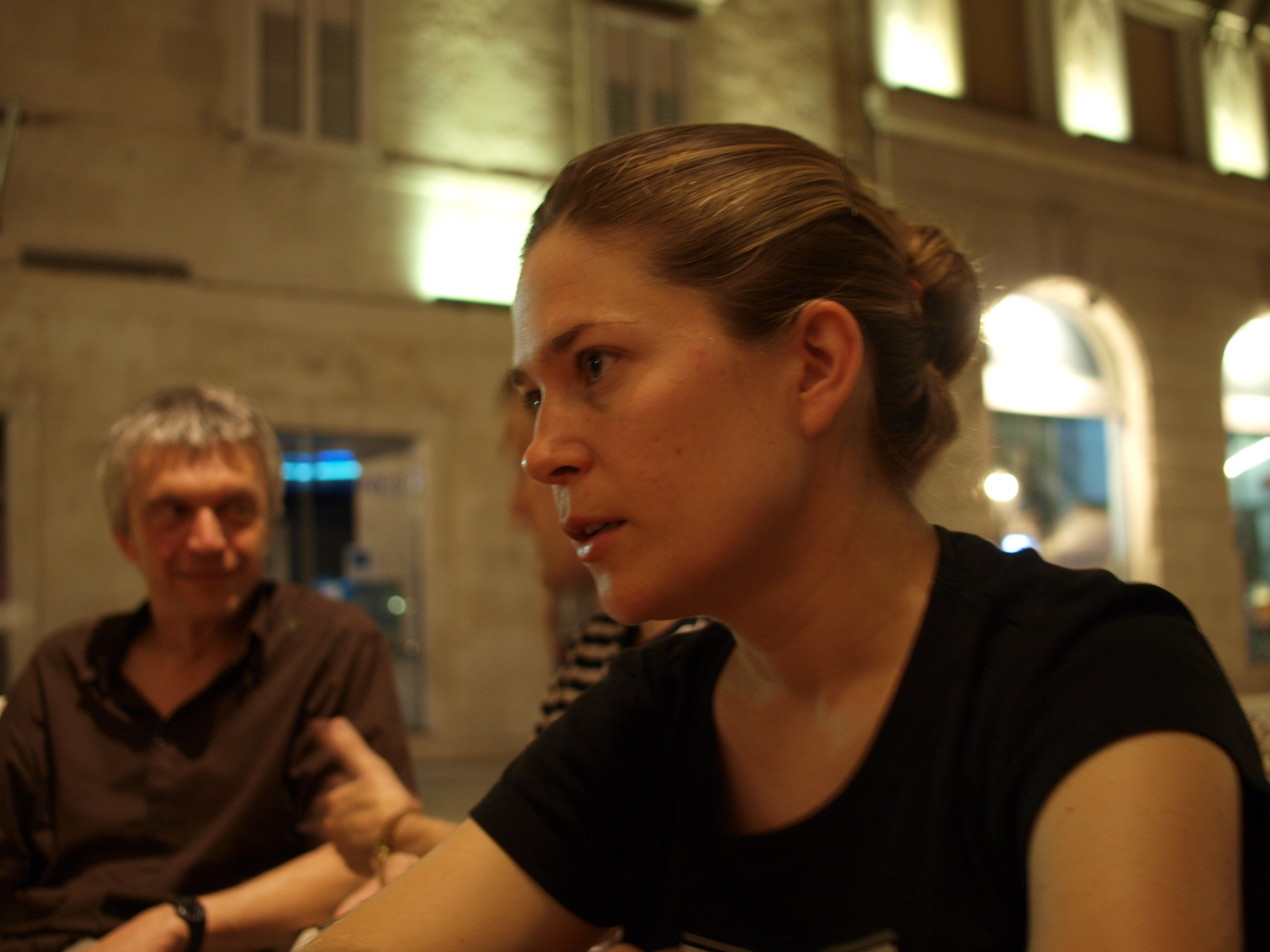
Miranda Veljačić in Split, 2009.

Miranda Veljačić (born 1976, Zagreb) is a Croatian architect, researcher and cultural worker.

She is co-founder, coordinator and current president of Platforma 9,81 an NGO focused on architectural research and the practice around alternative and youth culture, activism, urbanism and heritage of modernity.

Veljačić was an editor of Oris and Čovjek i prostor two main Croatian architecture magazines. In 2015 she represented Croatia at the Venice Biennale of Architecture together with Dinko Peračić, Emina Višnić, and Slaven Tolj.

== Biography ==
In 1999, when she was still a student, Veljačić, Dinko Peračić and Marko Sančanin founded an association for architectural research in Zagreb under the name Platform 9,81 as a result of their work with European Architecture Students Assembly. Miranda Veljačić graduated from the Architectural faculty in Zagreb in 2002.

Since 2003 she lives and works in Split, with her husband Dinko Peračić and two children.

== Professional work ==
In 1999, when she was still a student, Veljačić, with Dinko Peračić and Marko Sančanin co-founded an association for architectural research under the name Platforma 9,81 of which she is coordinator and current president. Platforma 9,81 consists of a Croatian group of architects, theorists, designers and urban planners and operates as a non-governmental organisation to stimulate interdisciplinary debate on urban spaces, globalisation and architectural practices. Next to being documented online, their research was published in the 2004 publication Superprivate. In 2011 the collective participated in the exhibition program Contemporary Art Archipelago, a program of site-specific works in the Turku archipelago in Finland.

She became a member of the presidency of the Association of Architects of Split in 2006 and a member of the programming committee of the Multimedia Cultural Center in Split. She works on research, elaboration for preservation-protection and promotion of modernist architectural gems like the Senatorium in Krvavica by Rikard Marasović. In 2009 her collaborative work on the revitalization project of the Youth Centre in Split, executed together with Dinko Peračić, won the Salon of Architecture prize. With this project, Peračić and Veljačić finished work on this monumental building which had been started in the 70s by architect Frane Grgurević. The building was never finished as cultural funding was halted, over the course of 12 years the architects collaborated to reconfigure the structure, which had been squatted by several groups, to make it functional and give it new an existing purpose. Similarly she co-developed (with Dinko Peračić) a project of reconstruction of Tvornica Jedinstvo (former factory) into Regional multifunctional cultural center Jedinstvo, in Zagreb which is still awaiting its reconstruction.

In 2016 she presented Croatia at the Venice Biennale of Architecture together with Dinko Peračić, Emina Višnić, and Slaven Tolj. Their collective project "we need - we do it" was documented in the catalogue REPORTING FROM THE FRONT with a contribution on the project entitled “we need it – we do it” – policy pragmatics and utopias," as well as in the publication WE NEED IT – WE DO IT commissioned by the Ministry of Culture of the Republic of Croatia. In this publication several other projects by Veljačić and the other architects in the biennial are discussed. In 2018 the project was awarded the Grand Prize of the 53rd Zagreb Salon of Architecture.

Veljačić speaks frequently at international and local art events, presenting her architecture practice, most often in collaboration with Dinko Peračić and advocating for public-civil partnerships and urban commons.
