= Kees Kaan =

Dutch architect (born 1961)

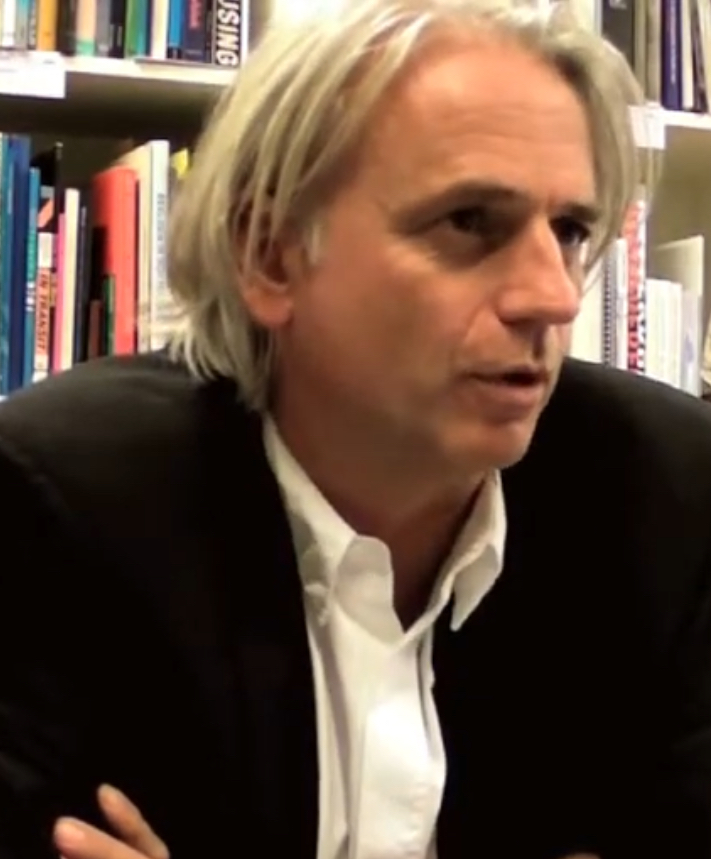
- Kees Kaan (2015)
- Born: June 8, 1961 (age 65); Breda, Netherlands
- Citizenship: Dutch
- Education: Delft University of Technology
- Occupation: Architect
- Awards: ARC16 Architecture Award (2016), Betonprijs (2009, 2011), Rotterdam Architecture Prize (2013)
- Practice: Claus en Kaan Architecten (1987–2013), KAAN Architecten (2014–present)
- Buildings: Supreme Court of the Netherlands, Royal Museum of Fine Arts Antwerp, Paleis Het Loo

Kees Kaan (born 8 June 1961) is a Dutch architect and professor of architectural design at the Delft University of Technology. He co-founded Claus en Kaan Architecten and, since 2014, is founding partner of KAAN Architecten in Rotterdam. Kaan argues that architecture is not an autonomous art form but a discipline grounded in social, financial, and spatial conditions.

== Biography ==
Kaan graduated in architecture from Delft University of Technology in 1987. He worked with Rudy Uytenhaak before founding Claus en Kaan Architecten with Felix Claus in 1987. In 2014, he established KAAN Architecten with Dikkie Scipio and Vincent Panhuysen.

He has been professor at TU Delft since 2006, first holding the Chair of Materialisation (2006–2012) and later the Chair of Complex Projects (2012–present). From 2019 to 2025 he served as head of the Architecture Department. Since 1994 projects by Kaan have been regularly included in the annual publication Architecture in the Netherlands Yearbook over more than three decades.

== Selected projects ==
- Netherlands Forensic Institute, The Hague (2004)
- Embassy of the Netherlands, Maputo, Mozambique (2004)
- Education Center, Erasmus MC, Rotterdam (2013)
- Supreme Court of the Netherlands, The Hague (2015)
- Royal Museum of Fine Arts Antwerp, Belgium (renovation, 2022)
- Paleis Het Loo, Apeldoorn (underground extension, 2023)
- Amsterdam Courthouse (2020)
- New Terminal Schiphol Airport (ongoing)

== Selected awards and recognition ==
- Lensvelt De Architect Interior Prize – Netherlands Forensic Institute (2005)
- Betonprijs – Crematorium Heimolen (2009)
- Betonprijs – AM Headquarters, Utrecht (2011)
- Rotterdam Architecture Prize – Education Center Erasmus MC (2013)
- ARC16 Architecture Award – Supreme Court of the Netherlands (2016)
- Nominations for the Mies van der Rohe Award (2015)
- Nominations for the Abe Bonnema Prize (2019)
- BNA Award – Paleis Het Loo (2024)

KAAN Architecten also initiated the video series MINUTES (2017–2022), which won the Dezeen Awards 2022.

Kaan is a member of the Académie d'Architecture in Paris.

== Publications ==
- Claus en Kaan Buildings (010 Publishers, 2001)
- Claus en Kaan Architecten: Ideal Standard, Buildings 1988–2009 (Prototype Editions, 2009)
- Amsterdam 2050: Complex Projects (TU Delft OPEN Publishing, 2019)
- PORTRAITS (Park Books, 2022)
- The Courthouse: Architecture for the Public Good (nai010, 2023)
- Reflections – Renewing Paleis Het Loo (nai010, 2023)
- Bridging Time (nai010, 2022)
