= Maastricht Institute of Arts =

Art school based in Maastricht, the Netherlands

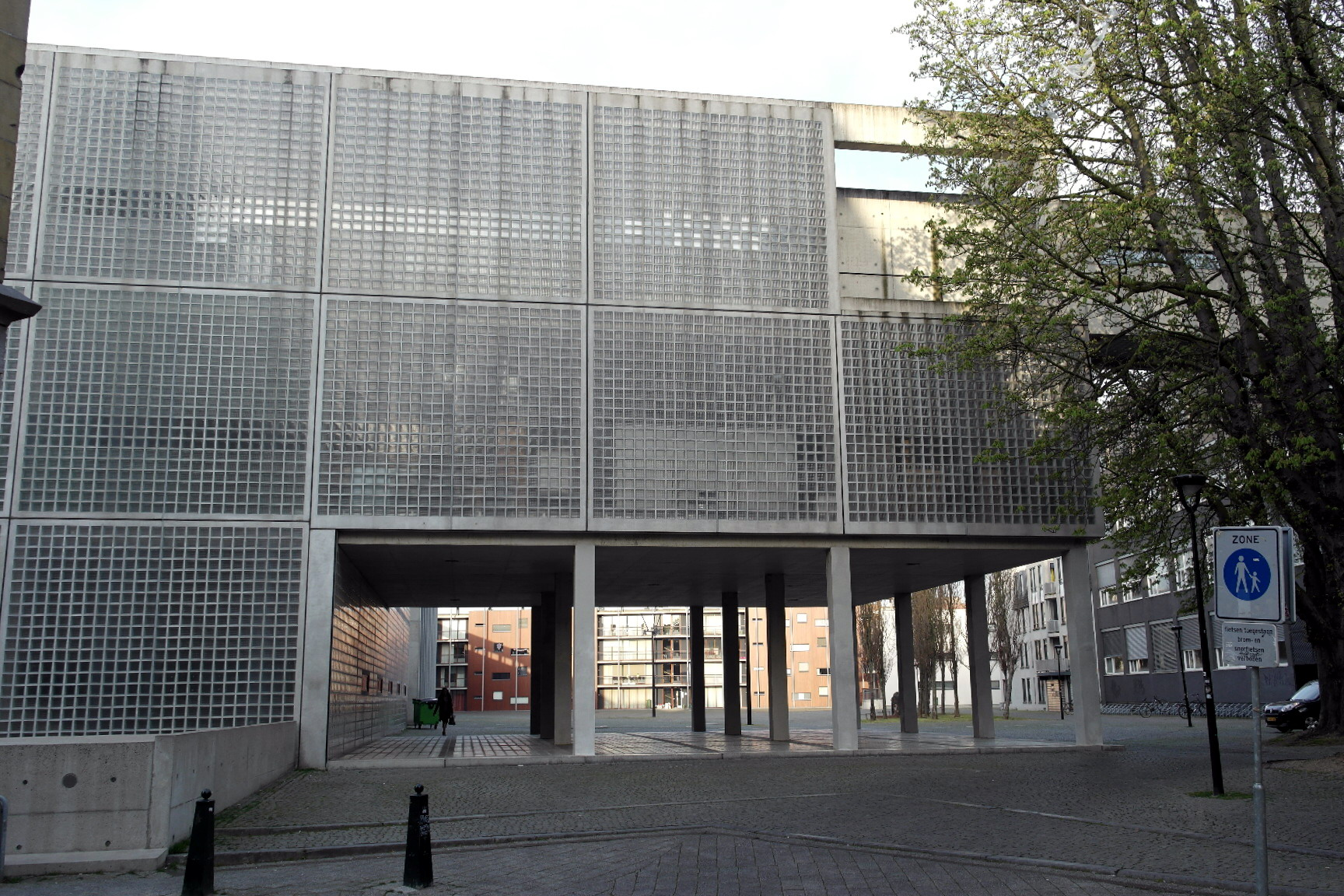
The extension of Academy of Arts Maastricht | Academy of Architecture Maastricht by Wiel Arets at Herdenkingsplein

Academy of Arts Maastricht | Academy of Architecture Maastricht, formerly known as Maastricht Institute of Arts, the Academie Beeldende Kunsten Maastricht (Maastricht Academy of Fine Arts and Design) and the Stadsacademie voor Toegepaste Kunsten (City Academy of Applied Arts), is a cluster of visual arts education from Zuyd University of Applied Sciences in Maastricht. The institute offers higher education in Bachelor of Education, Fine Arts and Design, Communication Design, Architecture and Interior Design, Interdisciplinary Arts, and in Master of Scientific Illustration, Architecture and Interior Design. Since 2020, the institute, in cooperation with the Academies of Music and Theatre, the Jan van Eyck Academy and Maastricht University, has offered the possibility of a doctorate in the visual arts. The institute focuses on the meaning of art as a phenomenon in its own right, with its own insights and laws.

The institute is located on Herdenkingsplein and Brusselsestraat in the Brusselsestraat neighbourhood in a building complex dating from the 1960s with a connected extension by Wiel Arets dating from 1993.

== History ==
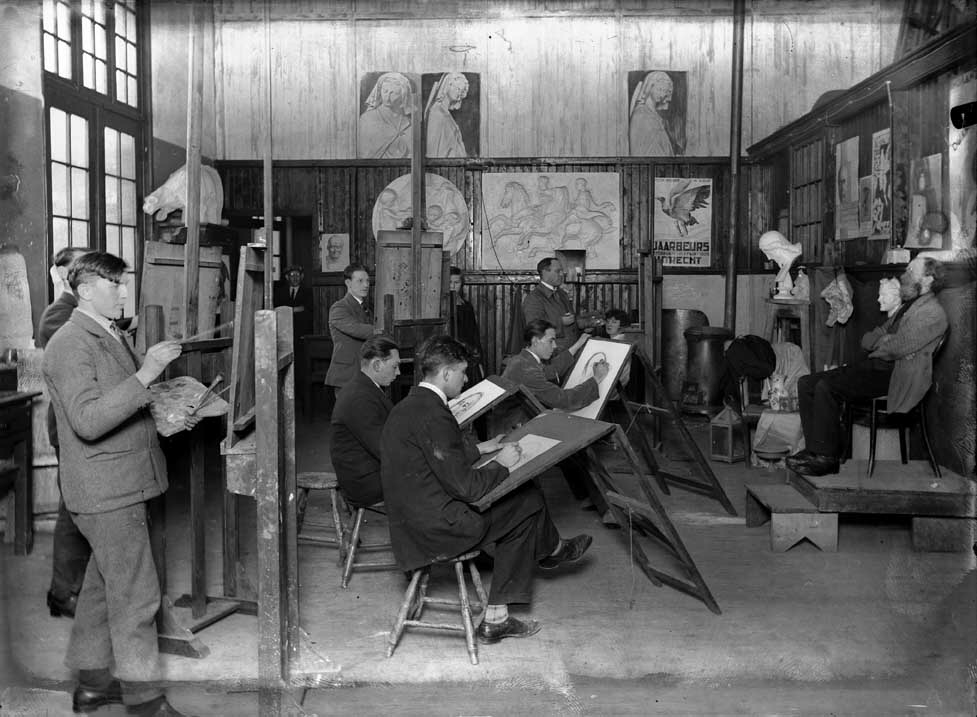
Model drawing from around 1935

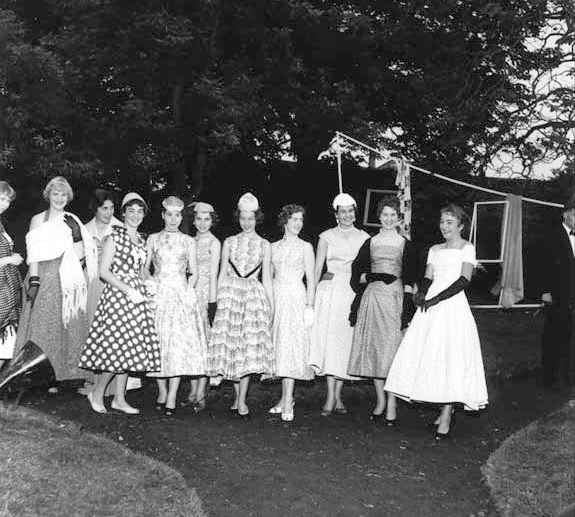
Fashion show, 1956

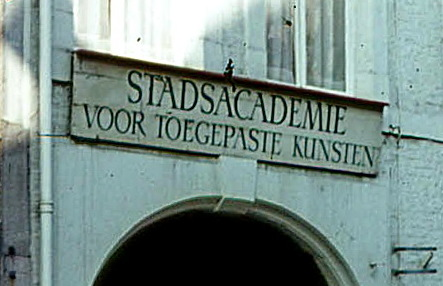
Detail Brusselsestraat 66. The doorway provided access to the Cellebroederskapel studios (1965)

A decision was taken by Royal Decree on 13 April 1817 to establish Tekenscholen (art schools) in as many cities as possible. The aim was to offer art education to young people as well as to craftsmen, particularly ‘in the drawing of the human image and in the basic rules of architecture.’ A silver medal and a degree certificate were issued to the most advanced pupils each year. The Stadsteekenschool was established in Maastricht in 1823 and later merged with the Burgeravondschool (Citizen Evening School) (1867-1921) and the Stadsteekeninstituut (City Art Institute) (1898-1926). These were located successively in the former Latin school (Achter de Comedie 1), the Augustijnenkerk, the Cellebroedersklooster, and a school building on Herbenusstraat. The Stadsteekenschool was a small institute with no more than 100 students. Well-known students included the brothers Theodoor and Alexander Schaepkens, Felix Duchateau, and Jan Brabant. Victor de Stuers, the later founder of the Dutch monumentenzorg (cultural heritage agency) followed art lessons here at a young age.

The Stadsteekeninstituut started in 1898 with 159 students and offered a more practically-oriented study programme. Rotterdam architect, Jacobus van Gils, was the first head from 1898 to 1902. Anton van de Sandt succeeded him in 1903. Well-known lecturers from that time included painter Rob Graafland and sculptor Frans van der Laar. Both, but mainly Graafland, had a decisive influence on the development of fine arts in Limburg. The Stadsteekeninstituut merged with the Middelbare Kunstnijverheidsschool in 1926, with Jos Postmès being the first head. After his premature death in 1935, the extremely striking Jef Scheffers became head until 1972. Scheffers stimulated Ger Lataster and others to continue studying in Amsterdam. Well-known lecturers from that time included the sculptors Charles Vos and Albert Meertens, both of whom influenced post-war sculptors in particular Piet Killaars and Arthur Spronken.

The Kunstnijverheidsschool taught the students in almost all art disciplines, from painting and graphics to glass art and theatre design, designing advertising letters, and even costume design. The lecturers at this time were somewhat more open to the influence of modern, especially French art (such as Bonnard and Matisse), but the study programme continued to focus mainly on the Maastricht pottery industry practice (decorative painting) and the production of church art commissions (religious paintings, sculptures, and stained-glass windows). The local glass factory, Astra, provided a studio and ovens for the glass art lessons.

== Stadsacademie voor Toegepaste Kunsten ==
From 1959 to around 1990, the academy was known as Stadsacademie voor Toegepaste Kunsten and from 1968 it officially offered a higher professional education study programme. In the 1970s, the academy expanded the number of disciplines offered, including teacher training to work as crafts and textiles teacher in secondary education. The academy started offering other courses in the 1980s, including modelling design, ceramic design, monument design, architectonic design, metal and plastics design, fashion design, and publicity design. The school was located in various buildings on Brusselsestraat until 1962, including in the refugee house of the noble cleric Sint-Gerlach (Brusselsestraat 77), the house in which Victor de Stuers was born. The former Cellebroederskapel (entrance on Brusselsestraat 66) served as studio space. In 1962, a new building was taken into use at Brusselsestraat 75, which previously housed an agency of Het Limburgs Dagblad newspaper. This building was constructed following a design by city architect Frans Dingemans, partly in the garden of the Sint-Gerlach refugee house. The rear of this building was expanded extensively in 1970 (today known as Herdenkingsplein). A second extension by architect Wiel Arets followed in 1993, including two building sections and a footbridge.

== Academy of Fine Arts and Maastricht Institute of Arts ==
The Stadsacademie merged with the then Rijkshogeschool Maastricht (state college) in 1990 and from that time was known as the Academy of Fine Arts.[1] In 2002 the academy became part of Zuyd University of Applied Sciences. The art academy merged with the Maastricht Academy of Architecture in 2008 and the new study programme in media and technological design. This became known collectively as the Maastricht Academies of Fine Arts, with the separate departments being Maastricht Academy of Fine Arts and Design (with two study programmes: Fine Arts and Design), Maastricht Academy of Media Design and Technology (with two bachelor study programmes: Communication & Multimedia Design and Design - Visual Communication) and Maastricht Academy of Architecture (with a bachelor in Architecture, and Interior Design and two master study programmes): Architecture and Interior Architecture). The programmes Fine Art and Design in Education, Master of Scientific Illustration, and Interdisciplinary Arts (iArts) are also offered.[2] Maastricht Institute of Arts has been the full official name since 1 September 2020.

Augustijnenkerk (Stadsteekenschool, 19th century)	Cellebroederskapel (studios at the Kunstnijverheidsschool, 1954)	Brusselsestraat 77 (Stadsacademie, 1962)	Brusselsestraat 75 and 77 (Stadsacademie, 1970)

== Accommodation ==
The main building on Herdenkingsplein comprises a square building section of ten arches wide and four floors high. The wide windows ensure optimal light ingress. The building, which dates from 1969–70, was plastered in 1995 and painted black following advice from Wiel Arets. The new building by Wiel Arets from 1990-94 comprises two sections connected by a skybridge. An auditorium, library, and canteen are located in the building block next to the main building, with the studios being located in the southern block opposite Kruisherenkerk. The minimalist building has a concrete frame and is covered with glass building blocks, providing a transparent effect, particularly in the evening. The floor of the skybridge is also made from glass blocks. The design received various architecture awards.

Herdenkingsplein main building	New building from Kruisherengang	Skybridge over the eastern entrance on Herdenkingsplein	Workspace in the south wing

== Plaster sculpture collection ==
The institute’s core collection of plaster sculptures is prominent (‘gipsotheek’ or plaster sculpture library). This collection of plaster sculptures is directly linked to the foundation of the legal predecessors of the Maastricht Institute of Arts on 3 February 1823 – it exposes the historical link and underlines the significance for the city of Maastricht. The gipsotheek is still in use in Maastricht and forms an active component of the current education in fine arts, which is unique in The Netherlands. In 2023, institutional art education in Maastricht will have been in existence for 200 years. In this context, the collection of plaster casts will be presented in the Bonnefantenmuseum Koepelzaal in 2023.

== Alumni ==
Well-known alumni include: Jef Diederen (visual artist), Pieter Defesche (visual artist), Ger Lataster (visual artist), Piet Killaars (sculptor), Appie Drielsma (sculptor), Jef Wishaupt (sculptor), Fons Bemelmans (sculptor), Fons Haagmans (visual artist), Maurice Mentjens (designer, interior designer), Kim Zwarts (photographer), Sidi El Karchi (visual artist; winner of Inspiratieprijs from the Prins Bernhard Cultuurfonds Limburg), Valentin Loellmann (artist, furniture designer), Pedro Boese (painter), Keetje Mans (visual artist; Koninklijke Prijs voor Vrije Schilderkunst, 2012), Hadassah Emmerich (painter), Pola Brändle (collage artist), Vera Hilger (painter), Les Deux Garçons (artist duo), Michaël Kolenbrander (filmmaker; including Clair de Lune, 2010), Krist Gruijthuijsen (Curator and art critic), Rafaël Rozendaal (Visual Artist) and Branko Popovic (fashion designer; initiator of Fashionclash). The designer Ted Noten, selected by Stichting Kunstweek as artist of the year in 2012, also studied at the academy for a time.
