= Salomon Frausto =

Salomon Frausto is an American architectural theorist, editor, curator, and educator.

Trained as an architect at the GSAPP at Columbia University in New York, he is currently the Director of Studies at the Berlage Center for Advanced Studies in Architecture and Design at TU Delft. Under the directorship of Joan Ockman, he served as coordinator of public and scholarly programs at the Temple Hoyne Buell Center for the Study of American Architecture at Columbia University. Frausto is the editor of Hunch (No. 12, Bureaucracy; No. 13, Consensus; No. 14, Publicity) and the co-editor of Architourism: Authentic, Exotic, Escapist, Spectacular (Prestel, 2005).
