= Daan Roosegaarde =

Dutch artist

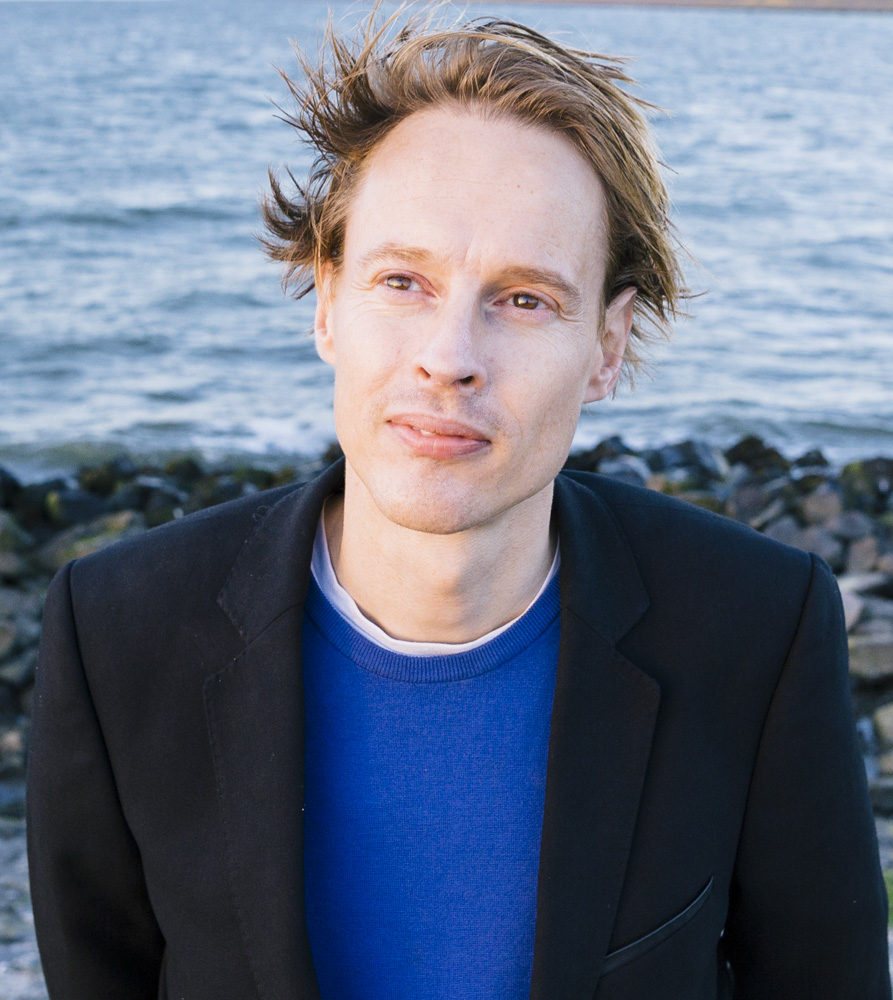
- Roosegaarde in 2016
- Born: 1979 (age 46–47); Nieuwkoop, Netherlands
- Education: art, architecture
- Notable work: Urban Sun; GROW; Smog Free Tower; Van Gogh Path; SPARK; Seeing Stars; Icoon Afsluitdijk; Beyond; Waterlicht; Smart Highway; Dune; Sustainable Dance Floor
- Awards: London Design Innovation Medal, 2020 Winner [d]arc awards 2020 Art – High: Grow, Netherlands by Studio Roosegaarde, 2021 Winner Global Future Design Awards,
- Website: www.studioroosegaarde.net/info

Daan Roosegaarde (born 1979) is a Dutch artist, pioneer and founder of Studio Roosegaarde, which develops projects that merge technology and art in urban environments. Some of the studio's works have been described as "immersive" and "interactive" because they change the visitors' surroundings in reaction to the behavior of those visitors. Other works are intended to increase environmental awareness and to add an aesthetic dimension that complements the technical solutions to environmental problems.

== Early life and education ==
Roosegaarde was born in 1979 in Nieuwkoop in The Netherlands. He studied at the Institute for the Arts in Arnhem (1997–1999), the AKI Academy for Art & Design in Enschede (2001–2003), and the Berlage Institute in Rotterdam (2003–2005).

== Overview ==
Video of Waterlicht (2016–2021) light display

Roosegaarde's projects often employ light design and sensing technology in an interactive manner, as illustrated in an early work, 4D-PIXEL, a "smart wall" that physically reacts to voice and music and shows 3D letters, created with his team at AKI Enschede and Saxion Enschede with KITT Engineering. In 2007, he founded Studio Roosegaarde, in Rotterdam, The Netherlands. The Studio is a social design lab, also called “The Dream Factory”. Later he opened a "pop-up" studio in Shanghai, China. There is permanent ancillary studio in Dubai.

The work of Studio Roosegaarde ranges from design installations that address sustainable energy solutions for the future to sensor-driven, touch-responsive interactive installations and community art projects. The studio's work explores the Dutch concept of Schoonheid, meaning "beauty", but also invoking "cleanliness" in reference to air, water and energy sources.

=== Environmental art ===
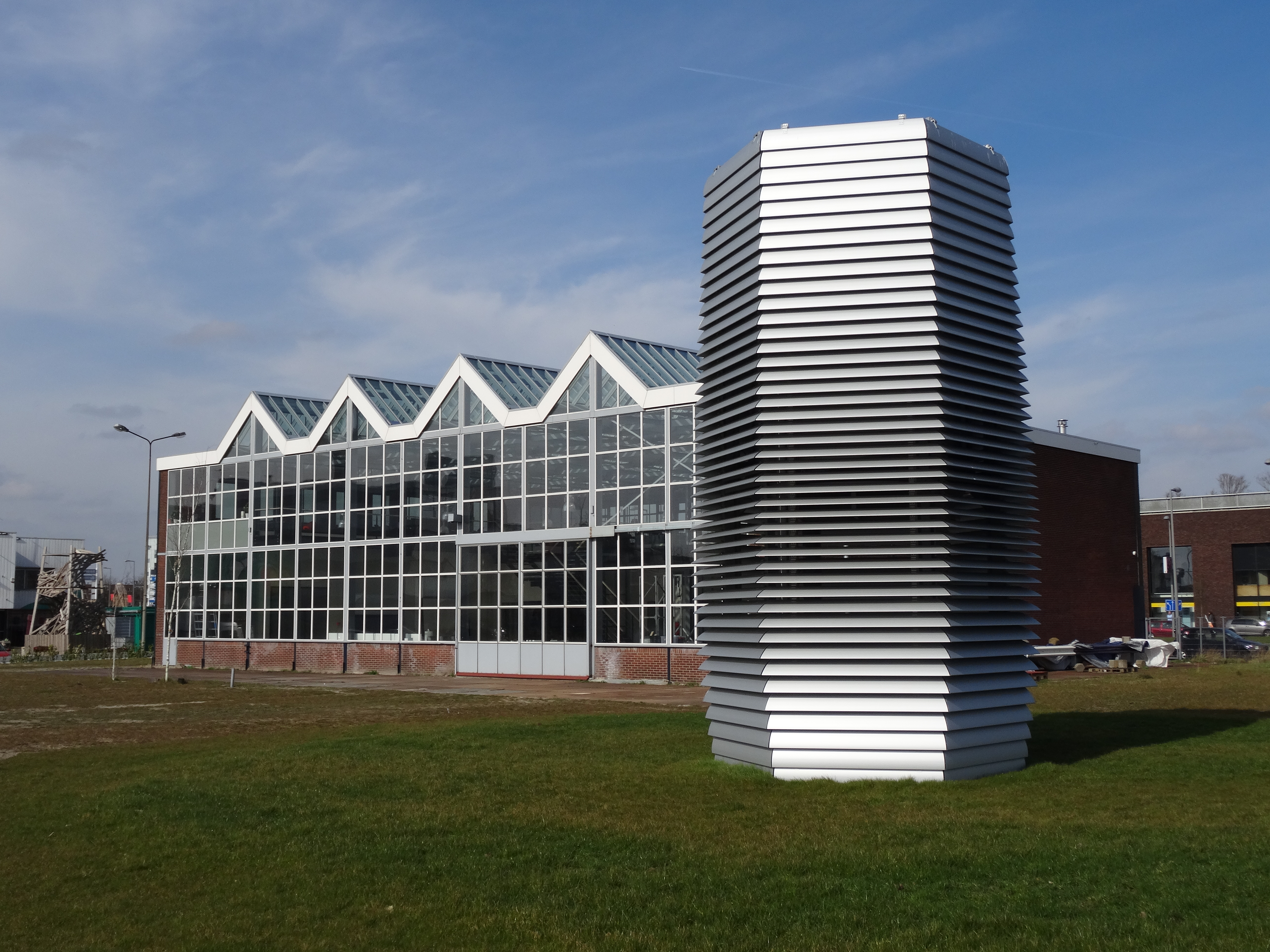
Smog-Free Tower—2015

From 2015 to 2017, Roosegaarde's studio created two environmental art projects, the "Smog Free Project" used art to clean the environment and the "Icoon Afsluitdijk Project" created immersive art on an existing dyke.

Smog Free Project (2015): In response to record 2013 air pollution in Beijing, Roosegaarde proposed the "Smog Free Project" with the following elements:

- Smog Free Tower: An aesthetically designed 7-metre (23 ft) smog tower to filter pollution—processing 30,000 cubic metres per hour (39,000 cuyd/h) of air, using 1,400 watts of power, and collects the impurities to be converted into jewellery.
- Smog Free Bicycle: Mounts filters on bicycles to collect air impurities as each bike travels. The design of the prototype was inspired by the manta ray, which filters water for food.
- Smog Free Rings: Designed as rewards to kickstarter supporters.

Icoon Afsluitdijk (2017): A design programme commissioned by the Dutch Government comprising three installations on the 32-kilometre Afsluitdijk dyke, built in 1932.

- Gates of Light: An installation sited on the dyke's floodgates, employs prisms that reflect light from vehicle headlights.
- Windvogel: Incorporates kites that generate wind power by moving their cable tethers, each of which is luminous and glows in the dark.
- Glowing Nature: Features live bioluminescent algae; single-celled organisms that emit light when under foot.
- Glowing Garden (2025): An installation using specialised lighting technology and ultraviolet wavelengths to reveal luminescent qualities in orchids, other flowers, trees and millipedes. The project explores aspects of ultraviolet light perceived by pollinating insects such as butterflies and bees that are normally invisible to humans.
- Firefly Garden (from 2024): A conservation-oriented garden project in Bali, Indonesia, developed with local collaborators including Nuanu and Udayana University. The project combines a garden environment with a breeding, conservation and nursery programme intended to support local firefly populations and raise environmental awareness. Studio Roosegaarde also produced the related short film Return of the Fireflies (2025), directed by Roosegaarde and documenting the Firefly Garden project in Bali and its efforts to restore local firefly populations. The film won Best Micro Film at the Swedish International Film Festival and received a Special Festival Mention in the documentary category at the 2025 Mumbai Shorts International Film Festival.

=== DreamScape series ===
Four "DreamScapes" that combine art and landscape are Urban Sun, GROW, Seeing Stars and SPARK.

- Urban Sun (2019–2021): Urban Sun employs far-ultraviolet light to remove a claimed 99.9% of airborne COVID and other viruses, employing research by Columbia University and Hiroshima University, while meeting international safety standards.
- GROW (2021): Grow is an installation of fibre-optic LED grow lights a field of leeks, which emit aesthetically pleasing blue, red, and ultraviolet (UV) light, with the claim that it enhances plant growth, while reducing the use of pesticides by up to 50% and using solar-power.
- Seeing Stars (2021): In partnership with Unesco Netherlands and the city of Franeker, this project was a coordinated one-night blackout of the city, intended to enhance a sense of shared community connection with the sky.
- SPARK (from 2022): A landscape installation consisting of thousands of biodegradable light elements that move with the wind, conceived as an alternative to traditional fireworks. It was first presented in Bilbao in 2022 and has since toured internationally, with presentations in Aix-en-Provence, Madrid, London, Auckland and Melbourne. Later presentations included Tokyo, Riyadh and Singapore, and Longwood Gardens in Pennsylvania in 2026.

=== Other works ===
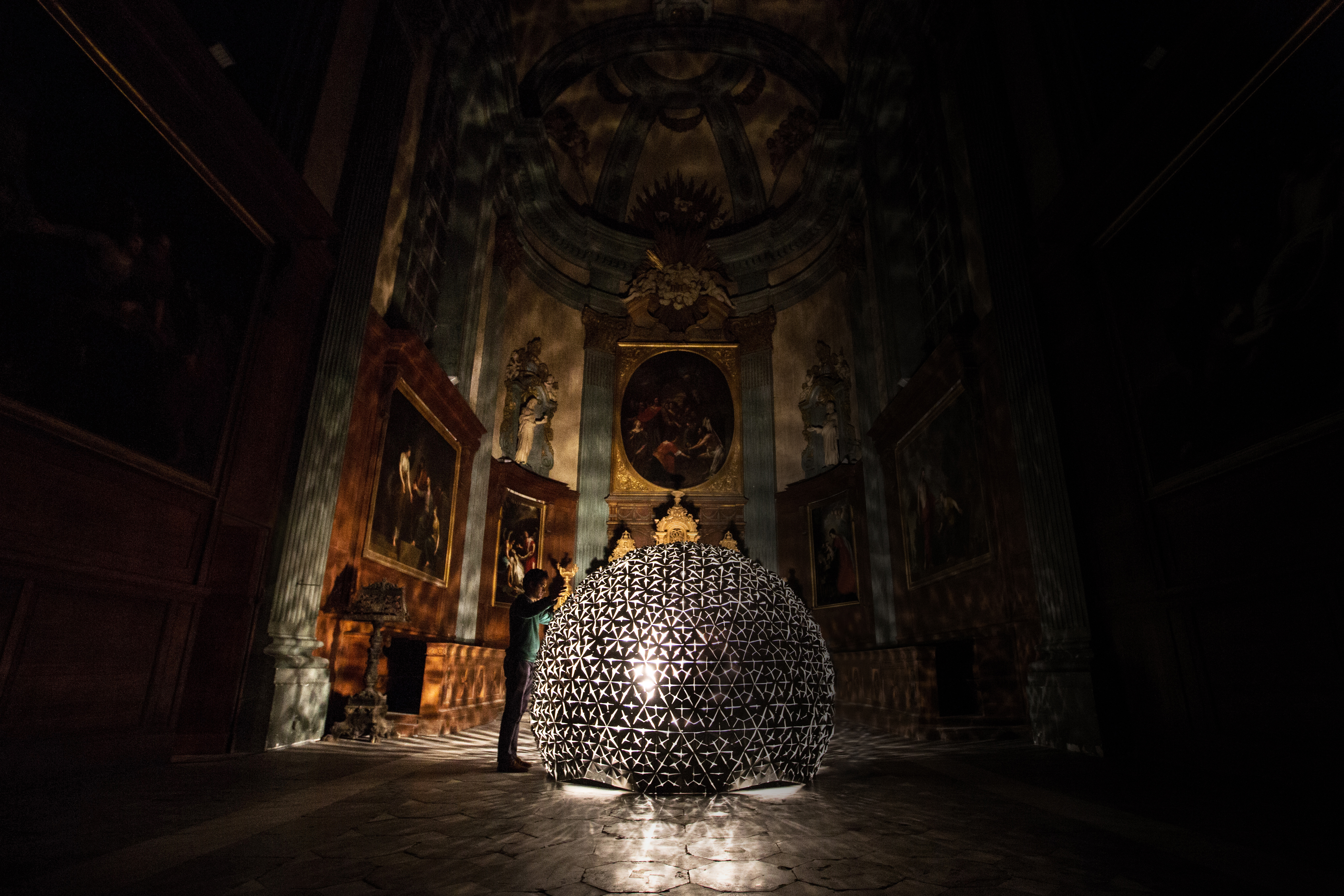
Lotus Dome—2010

Other works by the studio include:

- Liquid Space (2006): An installation that reacts to the presence of visitors using sensors, software and mechanisms to change the appearance of the space through lighting effects.
- FLOW (2007): A 10-metre-wide corridor of ventilator fans controlled by sensors, which reacted to the sound and motion of visitors passing through them, while on display in Ljubljana, Slovenia.
- DUNE (2007): A 60-metre installation along the Maas River in Rotterdam that uses fiberoptic lighting that changes color and intensity, according to the sounds of passersby, while using less than 60 watts of power.
- Space Waste Lab (2008): A continuing conceptual project to enhance awareness of space debris from spent satellites and missiles, using beams of light and to create artificial meteors from the capture waste.
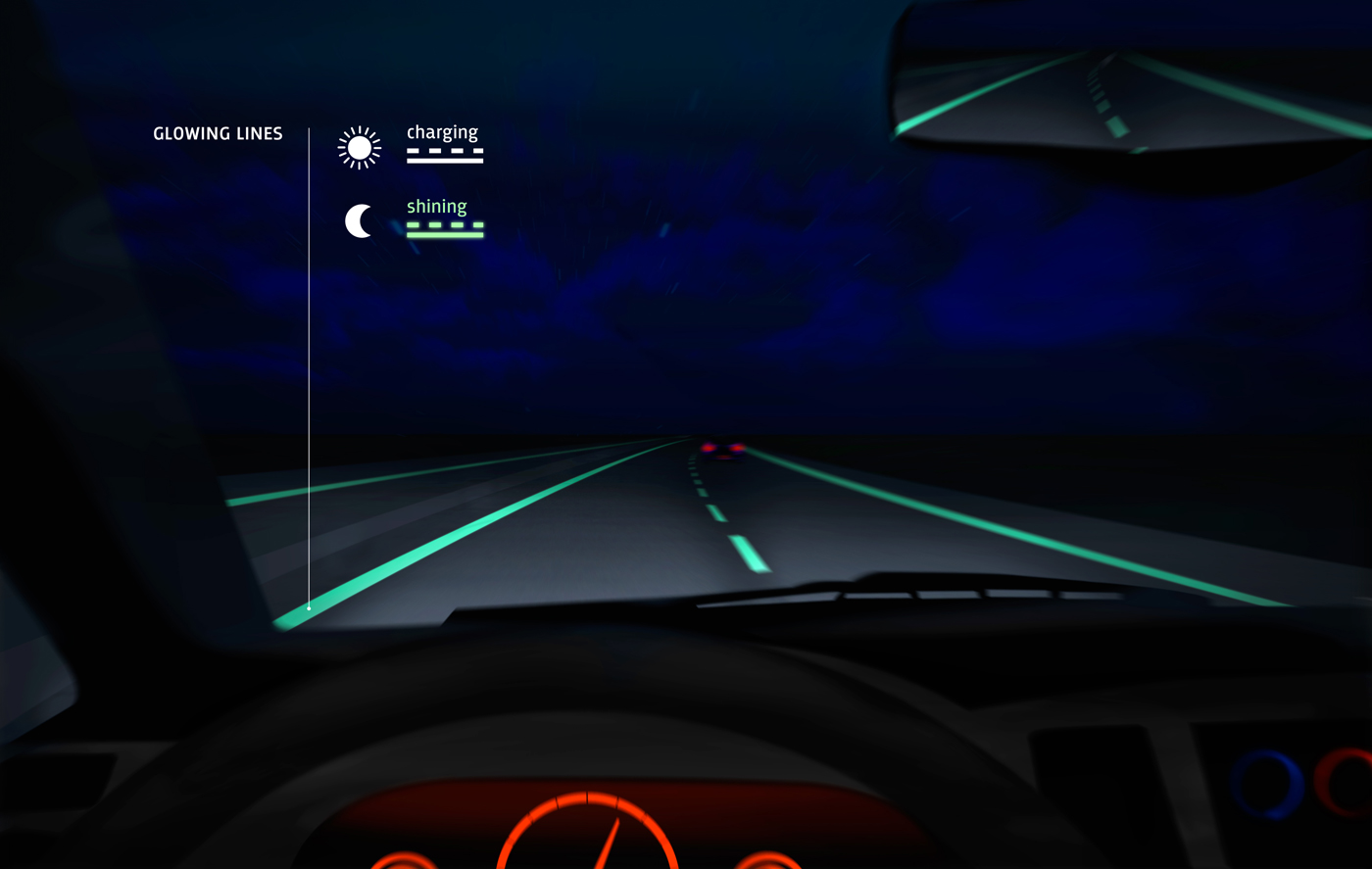
  Smart Highway—2014
- Intimacy (2010): A project to design garments that reacted to changes in heat produced by people present or by the environment. The heat changed the opacity of the garment "e-foil" material, based on sensor input. The e-foil material was produced in black and white versions.
- LOTUS (2010–2021): A series of artworks, employing a back-lit surface that opens and closes like a lotus in response to visitors' interactions with the surface. Shapes include: LOTUS DOME displayed in Sainte Marie Madeleine Church in Lille, France, LOTUS OCULUS was exhibited during the 2021 Salone del Mobile in Milan, and LOTUS Maffei, permanently displayed in the Palazzo Maffei Museum in Verona, Italy.

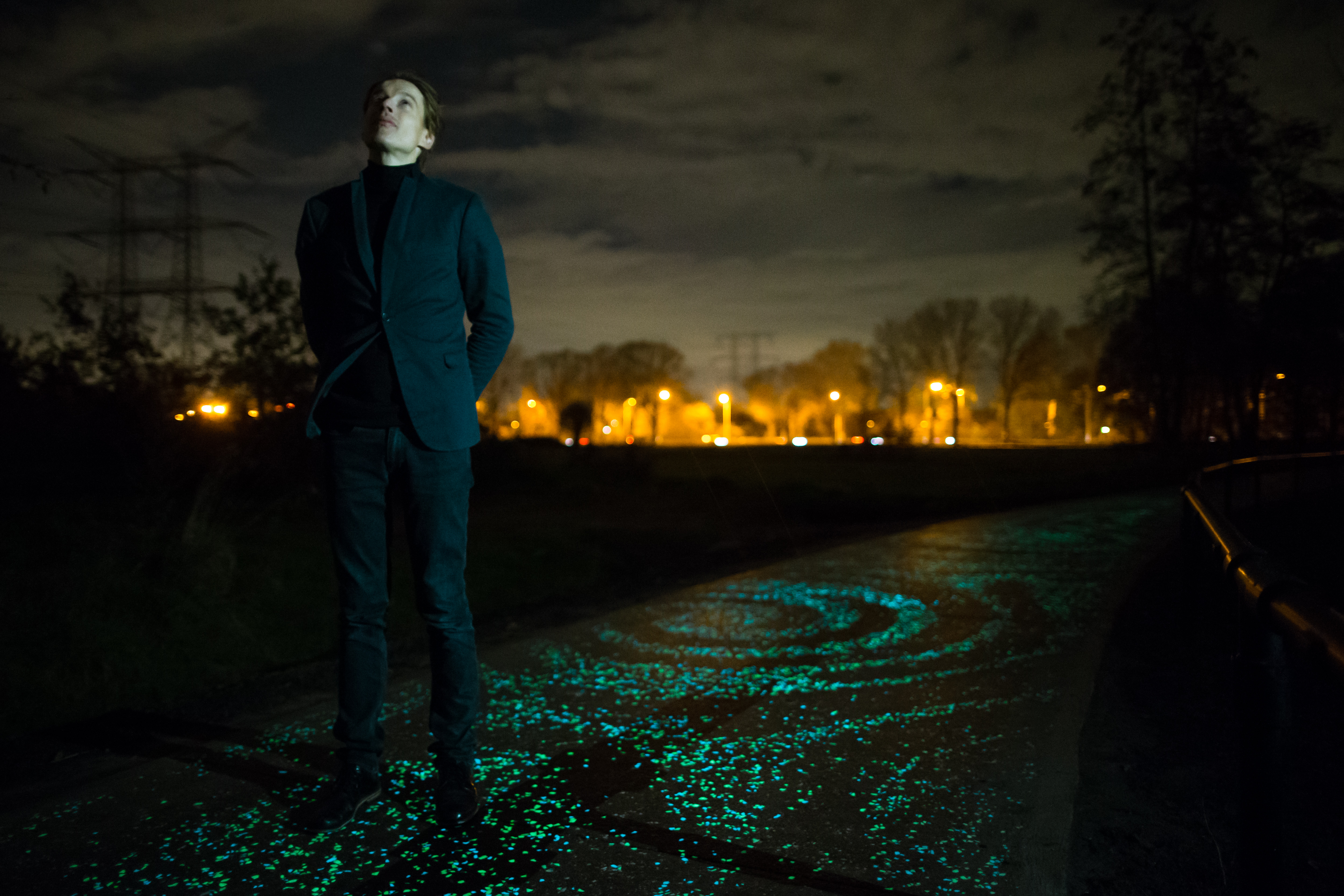
Van Gogh Cycle Path—2014

- Smart Highway (2014): A lighting project, in collaboration with the Heijmans infrastructure group to use light, which uses stored solar energy to illuminate highway delineations with glowing lines.
- Van Gogh Path (2012–2015): A 600-metre (2,000 ft) bicycle path between Nuenen and Eindhoven, which uses thousands lights that charge during the day and twinkle at night—inspired by Vincent van Gogh's painting, The Starry Night.
- Beyond (2016): A lenticular print of cloud images 121-metre (397 ft) long and back-lit by LED lamps at Amsterdam's Schiphol Airport, which gives the illusion of depth into the image.

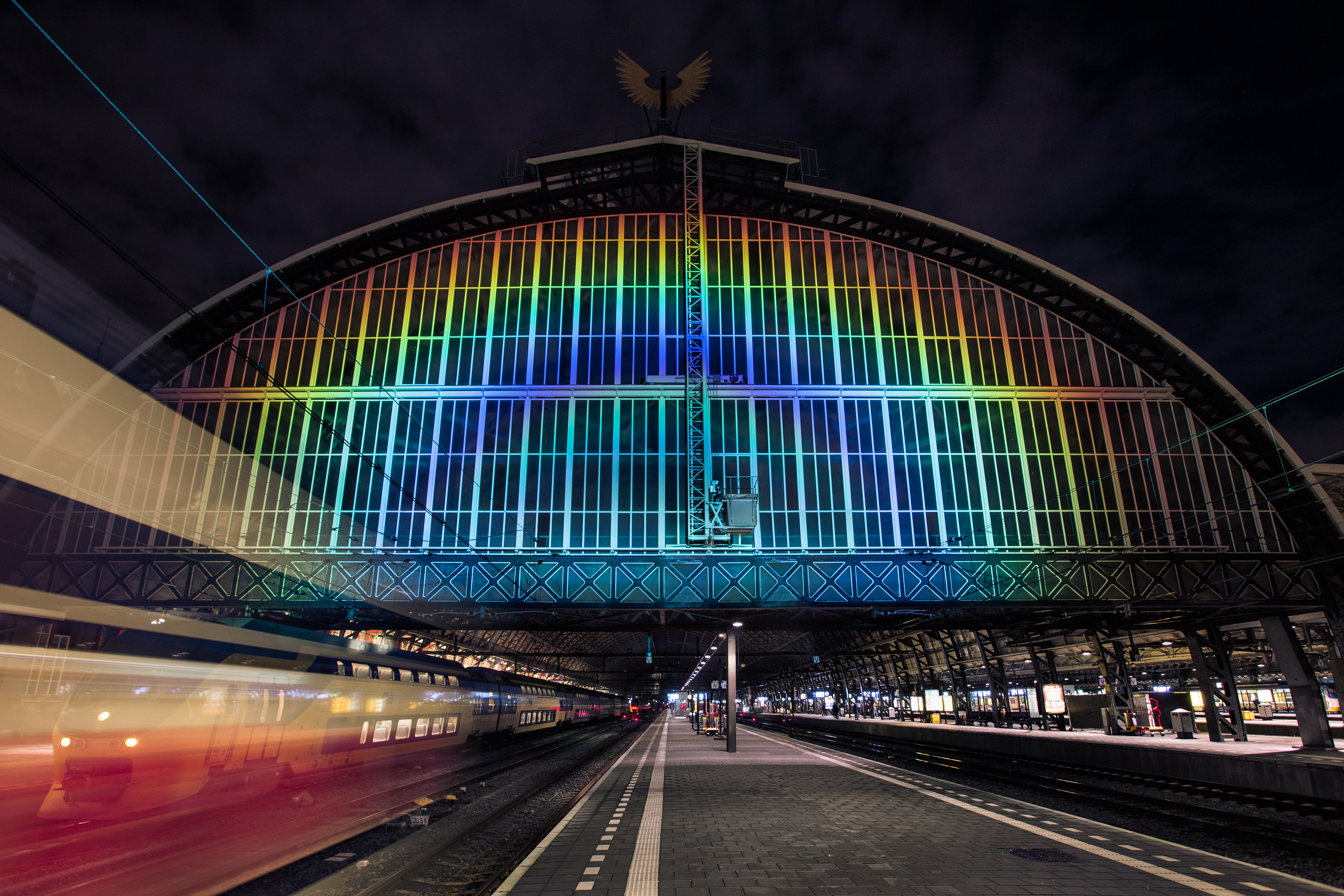
Rainbow Station—2016

- Rainbow Station (2016): A lighting project, in collaboration with Leiden University, which illuminates the 125-year-old Amsterdam Central Station.
- WATERLICHT (from 2015): A light installation that uses LEDs, lenses and software to create a wave-like moving layer of blue light above spectators, simulating a virtual flood and drawing attention to rising water levels and environmental change. The installation was first presented at the IJssel flood channel in Westervoort in February 2015. It was presented at Museumplein in Amsterdam in May 2015 and later shown internationally in cities including London, Toronto, Paris, Rotterdam, Dubai and New York City. It continued touring in 2025, including a presentation at Itsasmuseum Bilbao from 18 to 20 September.
- PRESENCE (2017): An 800-metre^{2} "immersive" installation in the Groninger Museum that uses hidden lights to illuminate a series of spaces, starting with a grid-like view of Holland from above, a Mondrian grid, where the room seems to scan the visitor with light, passing next into a second empty space, where sudden lights imprint the visitor on the wall, followed by a space occupied by luminescent balls on the floor and ending in a space with images of an intern, who helped create the fluorescent effect, on the floor, invoking both primitive and futuristic sensations.
- SYNC (2019): An "immersive" art installation wherein visitors create blue light rings around where they are walking on a flexible-membrane floor.
- Levenslicht (2020): An installation of 104,000 luminescent memorial stones representing each of the Dutch victims of the Holocaust. It was commissioned by the National Committee for 4 and 5 May and exhibited in Rotterdam on the banks of the Maas River, where the victims of Rotterdam were assembled to be deported. Subsequently, the work was divided among 170 municipalities with a Holocaust history.
- TOUCH (2021): An installation developed for the museum Draiflessen Museum collection in Mettingen, Germany, that senses when two visitors join hands and generates thousands of starry lights.

=== Permanent public artworks ===
Permanent public artworks include:

- 22 Beds, Enschede (2002)
- Spiral, Velp (2003)
- Lunar, Breda (2011)
- Marbles, Almere (2012)
- Van Gogh Path, Eindhoven/Nuenen (2012)
- Beyond, Schiphol Airport (2016)
- Space, Eindhoven Central Station (2017)
- Lichtsporen, Thor Park, Genk, Belgium (2024).

== Exhibitions ==
Studio Roosegaarde has exhibited at the Rijksmuseum, Stedelijk Museum Amsterdam, Tate Modern, Tokyo National Museum, Victoria and Albert Museum, the Musee des Arts Decoratifs in Paris, Google Zeitgeist, and the Design Museum in London.

== Professional activities ==
Roosegaarde spoke at TED2017 in Vancouver in 2017. He was named a Young Global Leader by the World Economic Forum in 2015. He has also served as a visiting professor at Tongji University in Shanghai. Phaidon published a monograph on Roosegaarde's work as part of its Contemporary Artists series. His Space Waste Lab project was developed with advice from experts from the European Space Agency, including engineer Michel van Pelt and astronaut André Kuipers, as well as NASA experts.

== Awards and recognition ==
Roosegaarde has received notable awards for his work including the Shenzhen Global Design Award, Ethics Ethical Award, LIT Lighting Design Award 2019, World OMOSIROI Award Japan, Beijing Media Architecture Award, Design Project of the Year Dezeen Award, London Design Innovation medal in 2016, the INDEX Design Award, DFA Gold and Grand Award Hong Kong, LIT 2017 Lighting Designer of the Year Award, Platinum A’Design Award 2017, D&AD Awards 2017, Core77 Design Awards 2017, Dutch Artist of the Year 2016, the World Technology Award, 2020 Winner [d]arc awards 2020 Art – High: Grow, Netherlands by Studio Roosegaarde, 2021 Winner Global Future Design Awards, 2021 Finalist World Changing Ideas Awards 2021, Urban Design finalists, and the 2021 Winner Media Architecture Awards, Spatial Media Art.

== Bibliography ==
- Adele Chong, Timo de Rijk, Daan Roosegaarde: Interactive Landscapes, nai010, Rotterdam, 2011. ISBN 978-9056627546
- Carol Becker, Nico Daswani, Fumio Nanjo, Daan Roosegaarde, Phaidon, London, 2019. ISBN 978-0714878324
