= Miguel Robles-Durán =

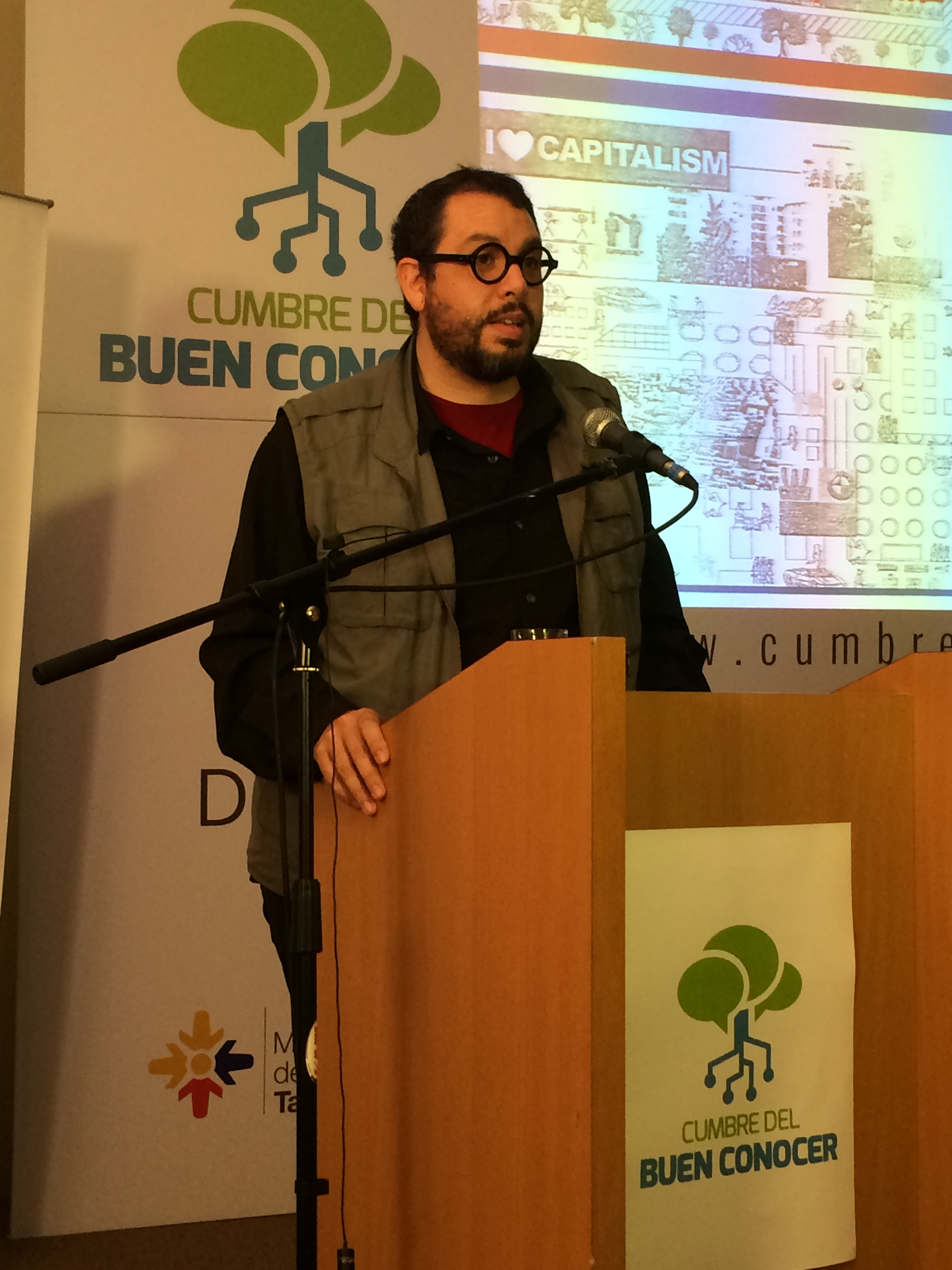
- Born: July 25, 1975 (age 51); Mexico City, Mexico
- Education: Berlage Institute, Monterrey Institute of Technology and Higher Education, Southern California Institute of Architecture
- Known for: Urbanism, Urban design, Urban theory, Activism

Miguel Robles-Durán (born July 25, 1975, Mexico City, Mexico) is an urbanist. He is a tenured Associate Professor of Urbanism at The New School / Parsons The New School for Design in New York City.

== Early life and education ==
Born in Mexico City, Mexico. At the age of nine, Robles-Durán moved to the border region between Tijuana, Mexico, and San Diego, California, in the midst of the rapid urban transformation stimulated by the North American Free Trade Agreement (NAFTA). In 1993, he left for Monterrey, Mexico, to study architecture at the Monterrey Institute of Technology and Higher Education (ITESM), and in 1996 complemented his undergraduate education at Southern California Institute of Architecture (SCI-Arc), in Los Angeles, California, under the guidance of the architect Teddy Cruz. He returned to Monterrey to finish his degree and received his bachelor's degree in Science in Architecture in 1998. In 1999 Robles-Durán returned to Tijuana and along with his partner, Gabriela Rendon, opened an architecture studio named Rhizoma. Among the many projects that Rhizoma built was the award-winning "Galeria Jardin" (2000), which received The Honor Award of The American Institute of Architects, San Diego Chapter in 2001 and the "Serial House #1" (2004), which was selected by the Museum of Contemporary Art San Diego to be part of Strange New World (2006), a traveling exhibition retrospective of art and design from Tijuana.

Robles-Durán began his academic career in Tijuana, teaching architecture and urban design at the Universidad Iberoamericana del Noroeste from 2000 to 2003. At the age of 28, Robles-Durán closed his architecture practice to focus on the larger aspects of urbanization. In 2004 he left Baja California to study in the Netherlands, where he received an advanced master's degree in Architecture and Urbanism from Rotterdam's Berlage Institute.

== Academic career ==
While living in Rotterdam, Netherlands, Robles-Durán began to develop the concept of Unitary Urban Theory and studied the political economy of urbanization from a strong driven Marxist perspective, designing his own curriculum in collaboration with the Berlage Institute and the Delft School of Design at Delft University of Technology (TU Delft). Robles-Durán continued his academic career in Europe in 2005 as adjunct professor of Urban Design at Katholieke Universiteit Leuven in the Human Settlements Post-Graduate Masters Program and as Gast Docent at Delft University of Technology in the Post-Graduate and Architecture Theory Department. After that he held positions as adjunct professor at the Delft University of Technology Architecture / City Interiors department in 2006, Unit Professor and Director of the “Social In-Habitat” Graduate Unit in Urbanism at Berlage Institute in 2006, Assistant Professor and Unit head of “Urban Asymmetries” at Delft University of Technology in 2007 and Associate Professor and co-director with the French-Swiss graphic designer Ruedi Baur of “Civic City” Postgraduate Program at the Zurich University of the Arts (ZHDK) in 2009.

In 2010, Robles-Durán left Europe and moved to New York City, where he was appointed by Parsons The New School for Design, a division of The New School, as assistant professor of Urbanism. There, he developed and directed the Masters in Science program in Design and Urban Ecologies. Robles-Duran held the position of director of the program until the beginning of 2014, and today continues his academic career as a tenured associate professor of Urbanism at this institution.

== Research ==
Robles-Durán's main research is centered on the strategic definition and coordination of transdisciplinary urban projects, as well as on the development of tactical design strategies and civic engagement platforms that confront the contradictions of neoliberal urbanization, such as homelessness, housing crises, gentrification, the effects of financialization on the real-estate industry, inter-urban competition, and urban social movements. In 2007, Robles-Duran's research work on Social Inhabitation earned him the Designing Politics —The Politics of Design award, given by the HFG Ulm at Ulm School of Design, Germany. Among his writing projects is the book “Urban Asymmetries: Studies and Projects on Neoliberal Urbanization” (2011), written and co-edited with Tahl Kaminer and Heidi Sohn, which reviews the dire consequences that neoliberal urban policies have had upon the city and which discusses possible alternatives to market-driven development.

== Urban Projects ==
- Playgrounds For Useful Knowledge with Cohabitation Strategies (Philadelphia, United States 2015) Commissioned by The City of Philadelphia Mural Arts Program
- We Promise! with Martha Rosler (Hamburg, Germany 2015) Commissioned by Stadkuratorin of the City of Hamburg
- Comfort Zones with Cohabitation Strategies (Mississauga, Canada 2015) Commissioned by The Blackwood, University of Toronto Mississauga
- Uneven Growth NYC with Cohabitation Strategies (New York, United States 2014–2015) Commissioned by The Museum of Modern Art (MoMA)
- R For Republic with Cohabitation Strategies (Milan, Italy 2014) Commissioned by BAAM! Polo Culturale Urbano a Milano
- The Power of Two with Cohabitation Strategies in collaboration with Jeanne van Heeswijk and Freehouse (Rotterdam, The Netherlands 2013) Commissioned by Freehouse Rotterdam.
- Monument To Urban Destruction with Cohabitation Strategies (Istanbul, Turkey 2012) Commissioned by the 2012 Istanbul Design Biennale
- Guelph-Wellington Urban-Rural with Cohabitation Strategies (Guelph, Canada 2011–2013) Commissioned by The Musagetes Foundation.
- Campagna Urbana / Urban Campaign with Cohabitation Strategies (Lecce, Italy 2011) Commissioned by the City of Lecce and The Musagetes Foundation
- Bordeaux Report Evento Biennale with Cohabitation Strategies (Bordeaux, France 2010–2011) Commissioned by The City of Bordeaux and Michelangelo Pistoletto
- The Other City: Tarwewijk with Cohabitation Strategies (Rotterdam, The Netherlands 2009–2010) Commissioned by The City of Rotterdam and the Dutch Stimulering Funds
- Right To The City BeNeLux Chapter with Cohabitation Strategies (Randstad, The Netherlands 2010)
- Communal City / Ciudad Comunal with Cohabitation Strategies (Valencia, Venezuela 2009) Commissioned by the City of Valencia.
- Urban Union Tarwewijk with Cohabitation Strategies (Rotterdam, The Netherlands 2008–2010) Commissioned by The 2008 International Architecture Biennal Rotterdam
- “For Whom We Make” Venice Biennale of Architecture, Dutch Pavilion (Venice, Italy 2008)

== Writings ==
- “The Rise of the Instant Activist: and how it’s transforming the practice of architecture, urbanism, and the way our cities are built” (Revised version), Article in South as a State of Mind Arts and Culture Publication, fall / winter 2015 issue # 5
- The Haunting Presence of Urban Vampires, Article, Harvard Design Magazine #37, Cambridge. (2014)
- “For the Brief Moments of Confrontation” in Make_Shift City: Renegotiating the Urban Commons, Jovis Press; Bilingual edition. (2014)
- Social Housing - Housing the Social: Art, Property and Spatial Justice, “Unitary Urbanism: A Citizens’ Occupation”, Book Contributor (Essay), Sternberg Press, Berlin.
- “Prelude to a Brand New Parallel Urban World”, Article, Volume Magazine #30, Amsterdam/New York
- Urban Asymmetries: Studies and Projects on Neoliberal Urbanization, Book (Ed.), 010Publishers, Rotterdam.
- Art and Activism in the Age of Globalization, “The Rise of the Instant Activist”, Book Contributor (Essay), NAi Publishers, Rotterdam.

== Interviews ==
- yle Arena Radio (In Finnish and English)
- CJSW 90.9 fm, Calgary Space + Place #44
- WikiToki (Bilbao)
- HfG Ulm 1968-1988, Social In-Habitat Caracas, ed. Rene Spitz.
- Expert Russia (periodical) Expert (magazine)
- Camera Austria International vol. 117, What Can Art Do For Real Politics, “Occupy Wall Street, Still Thriving”.
