= Berlage Institute =

Former architecture school in the Netherlands

Coordinates: 51.9228°N 4.4867°E

The Berlage is an advanced postgraduate program currently based in Delft, the Netherlands. Founded in 1990 as the Berlage Institute in Amsterdam, it operated as an independent, unaccredited postgraduate school of architecture with an international student body and faculty, later relocating to Rotterdam.

Named after the Dutch architect Hendrik Petrus Berlage, the institute established a reputation as a platform for experimental design and critical discourse. In 2012, the program was re-established at Delft University of Technology as the Berlage Center for Advanced Studies in Architecture and Urban Design, becoming an accredited program offering a post-master degree. While undergoing institutional and geographic transformations, the program has maintained continuity in its pedagogical approach, adapting to new academic and cultural contexts while preserving its focus on cross-cultural research and design.

== The Berlage Institute (1990–2012) ==
The school was founded by Dutch architect Herman Hertzberger, who also served as the first dean. At that time, the school was located in Aldo van Eyck's Children's Orphanage in Amsterdam. Later, the institute moved to Botersloot 25 in Rotterdam.

In 1995, Wiel Arets was appointed dean, drastically restructuring the school to a research-based institute. While dean, Arets initiated the school's publication, HUNCH, which was originally edited by Jennifer Sigler, editor of Rem Koolhaas' S,M,L,XL. Arets expanded the school's international prominence through the publication of HUNCH, extensive global study trips, public lectures, and notion of the 'year theme', with the 2001-2002 theme of 'Double Dutch' researching the doubling of the Netherlands' population. Architectural debate was fostered with prominently known architects, lecturers, and guest-professors, such as Zaha Hadid, Rem Koolhaas, Stan Allen, Kazuyo Sejima, Jean Nouvel, Kenneth Frampton, Tadao Ando, and Toyo Ito.

Notable alumni include Daan Roosegaarde, Miguel Robles-Durán, Vasa J. Perović, Reinier de Graaf, Ana Dzokic and Bas Princen, Mika Cimolini.

Arets stepped down in 2002, and was succeeded by Spanish architect Alejandro Zaera-Polo (2002-2005).

The Croatian architect and educator Vedran Mimica was the last director. Due to the Netherlands' government funding cuts, the Berlage Institute was forced to dissolve its existence as of 1 August 2012.

== The Berlage Center for Advanced Studies in Architecture and Urban Design (2012–Present) ==
In 2012, the Berlage Institute was re-established as the Berlage Center for Advanced Studies in Architecture and Urban Design (commonly referred to as The Berlage) and relocated to the Faculty of Architecture and the Built Environment at the Delft University of Technology in the Netherlands. Since its integration into TU Delft, the program has operated within an accredited academic framework, enabling it to award recognized degrees. The current director of studies is Salomon Frausto.

=== Post-master in Architecture and Urban Design ===
The Berlage Post-Master in Architecture and Urban Design is a full-time postgraduate program of approximately 18 months, structured as an intensive, studio-based environment. It is designed for graduates seeking to further develop their research, design, and critical thinking skills through collaborative and experimental approaches to architectural education.

The curriculum consists of three academic terms and includes research- and design-based studios, theoretical seminars, fieldwork, and masterclasses. Teaching is delivered by invited international designers and scholars, alongside faculty members from TU Delft’s Faculty of Architecture and the Built Environment. The program also hosts a public program of lectures and events, branded as The Berlage Keynotes and The Berlage Sessions contributing to broader architectural discourse.

The program emphasizes new forms of architectural thinking, alternative approaches to design processes, and evolving modes of practice as both designer and researcher. It promotes an integrated understanding of architecture and urban design as shaped by cultural, social, and economic conditions, as well as strategic, organizational, and spatial considerations. Upon completion, students are awarded a Master of Science degree in Architecture and Urban Design (Berlage Post-Master), accredited by the Dutch-Flemish Accreditation Organisation (NVAO).
