= Vedran Mimica =

Croatian architect and educator (born 1954)

Vedran Mimica (born 1954 in Zagreb) is a Croatian architect and educator who teaches at the Illinois Institute of Technology. He is known for being the last director of the Berlage Institute in Rotterdam, Netherlands, from 2002–2012.
