= List of people from Heerlen =

This is a list of notable people from Heerlen, The Netherlands.

== Born in Heerlen ==
The following were born or adopted in Heerlen. Some became famous after they moved away.

=== A ===
- Wiel Arets (1955), architect and urban planner

=== B ===
- Thomas Bernhard (1931–1989), novelist and playwright
- Jessica Blaszka (1992), wrestler
- Melanie Bonajo (1978), artist and filmmaker
- Roel Brouwers (1981), football player

=== C ===
- Jo Coenen (1949), architect and urban planner

=== D ===
- Johan Michiel Dautzenberg (1808–1869), writer and poet
- Isabelle Diks (1965), politician

=== E ===
- Silvio Erkens (1990), politician

=== G ===
- Harrie Geelen (1939–2025), illustrator and writer
- Agnes Giebel (1921–2017), classical soprano
- Dion Graus (1967), politician

=== H ===
- Hubert-Jan Henket (1940), architect
- Loek Hermans (1951), politician
- Tamara Hoekwater (1972), singer
- Danny Hoesen (1991), football player
- Jan Hugens (1939–2011), road cyclist
- Guus Hupperts (1992), football player

=== K ===
- Shirley Kocacinar (1986), football player

=== L ===
- Jef Lataster (1922–2014), long distance runner
- Romée Leuchter (2001), football player

=== M ===
- Issam El Maach (2000), football player
- Jan Mans (1940–2021), politician and mayor
- Eugène Martineau (1980), decathlete
- Jan Mertens (1916–2000), politician

=== P ===
- Jeanine Hennis-Plasschaert (1973), politician

=== R ===
- Peter Raedts (1948–2021), medievalist
- Fernando Ricksen (1976–2019), football player
- Jo Ritzen (1945), economist and politician
- Rob Ruijgh (1986), road cyclist

=== S ===
- Peter Joseph Savelberg (1827–1907), priest and missionary
- Pierre Schunck (1906–1993), businessman and resistance leader
- Ger Senden (1971), football player
- Nicoline van der Sijs (1955), linguist and etymologist
- Rutger Stuffken (1947–2023), Olympic rower
- Jules Szymkowiak (1995), racing driver

=== T ===
- Gijs Tuinman (1979), knighted military officer
- Nic. Tummers (1928–2020), politician

=== V ===
- Klaas de Vries (1943), politician

=== W ===
- Carlijn Welten (1987), field hockey player
- Oswald Wenckebach (1895–1962), sculptor and painter

== Born somewhere else ==
These people were not born or adopted in Heerlen but are or were well known for living there.

=== G ===
- Rob Geus (1971), cook and TV presenter (Rotterdam)

=== P ===
- Frits Peutz (1896–1974), architect (Uithuizen)

=== S ===
- Peter Schunck (1873–1960), businessman (Hergenrath, Prussia)
- Fatih Sonkaya (1981), football player (Oltu, Turkey)

=== T ===
- Frans Timmermans (1961), politician (Maastricht)

=== W ===
- Jan de Wit (1945), politician (Zevenbergen)
