= Schunck =

Museum in Heerlen, the Netherlands

Firma Schunck
- Last used logo by Firma Schunck

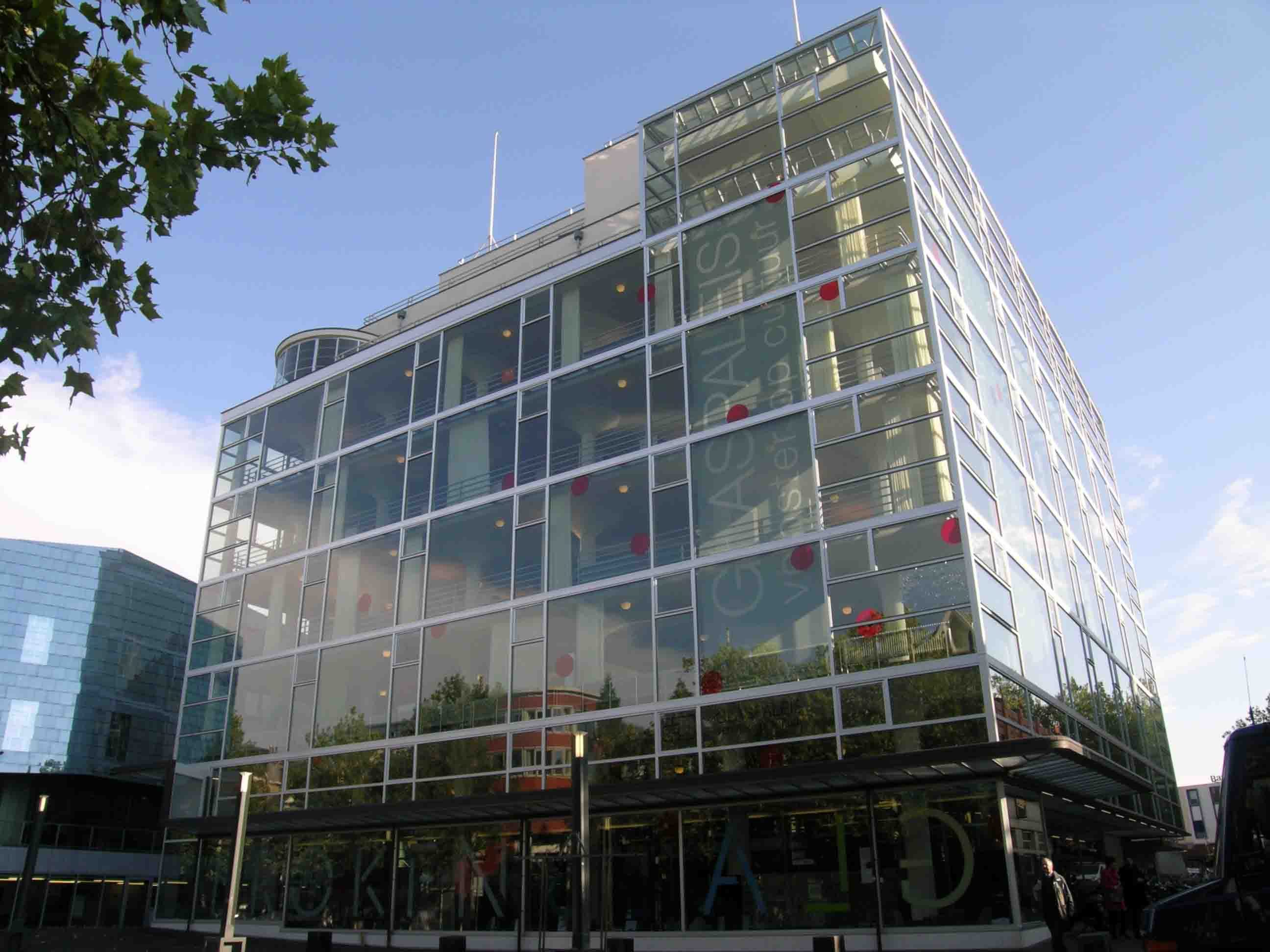
- Founded: 1874 in Heerlen, The Netherlands
- Founder: Arnold Schunck
- Fate: Acquisition by Berden in 1995
- Headquarters: Heerlen, The Netherlands
- Products: Clothing

Schunck (Dutch pronunciation: [ɕuŋk]) is the name of former fashion house and department store Firma Schunck in Heerlen, the Netherlands. It is also the name for the collection of buildings the firm has been housed in, one of which is known as the Glaspaleis (Glass Palace), which is now a cultural centre and declared one of the 1000 most important buildings of the 20th century by the Union of International Architects.

The business grew from a small weaver's shop to the major department store in Heerlen and the innovating force in that town when coal mining declined. Over more than a century, it has been run by four consecutive generations of the family Schunck.

In current time, the Glaspaleis is a multidisciplinary cultural centre for contemporary art, architecture, music, dance and library named SCHUNCK.

== Prelude – a family of weavers ==
In Eupen-Kettenis (or Kettenich) in the German-speaking part of Belgium, records show that a weaver (Tuchmacher) named 'Schunck' was established as early as 1776. His eldest son, Nikolaus Severin Schunck (1799–1865), had six sons (and one daughter), of whom the third oldest, Arnold, would later found the firm in Heerlen. Because business was slow, only the one but youngest, Joseph, would remain in the weaving mill. But he appears to have survived, because to this day there is still a weaving mill in Kettenis run by descendants of Nikolaus.

=== Wanderings (1858) ===
Nikolaus Severin's children
Nicola
Anna Maria
Wilhelm
Johann Arnold
Severin
Severin-Joseph
Ludwig

After his mother died in 1858, Arnold went to Eupen to learn the trade at P. Fremereij's factory, where he became a 'Meisterweber' (master weaver). The family disputes over whether traditional or mechanised (steam powered) weaving was the way of the future made Arnold decide to use his obligatory travels as a Wanderbusche (travelling apprentice) to decide for himself. From 17 April to 5 November 1860, he travelled (largely on foot) to Silesia (a centre for mechanical weaving), Mannheim, Munich, Nuremberg, Berlin and Hamburg, but this only resulted in a few jobs as a handweaver and he never got to work in a mechanised weaving factory because the owners of these modern factories had little respect for the traditional 'Wanderburschen'. As a result, from then on, he always stuck to handweaving.

He returned to Kettenis to work with his father. His brother Nicola, however, who had also struck out on his own in 1858, had switched to mechanised weaving, working in Aachen at the Delius textile factory (as overseer), which had important international connections. He was persuaded by Russian entrepreneurs to set up a weaving factory in Białystok in Russia (now Poland), a major centre of the textile industry at the crossroads of the important St Petersburg – Berlin and Königsberg – Odessa roads. So he went there in 1863 with Wilhelm, the second oldest son. Later that year, Arnold followed, but only to accompany Nicola's wife, and returned a year later, another useful experience richer.

When father Nikolaus Schunck died in 1865 (of 'dust lungs', a typical weavers affliction), Severin-Joseph, who was to take over the business, wanted to mechanise, but didn't have the financial means to do so. There were assets (house, looms) but little cash. So when in 1986 Wilhelm returned from Russia to get married, the brothers decided to leave Severin-Joseph the inheritance. (Note that the brothers had rights to the entire inheritance because they had been working at the mill for years without pay.) Severin-Joseph no longer needed the handlooms now, so in return the other brothers would receive one of the hand-weaving looms each (quite literally heirlooms) and five years later they would additionally receive 1000 Rheinische Thaler and cloth woven by Severin-Joseph. Luckily, the unification of Germany in 1870 opened new markets, which gave such a boost to the economy that he could easily hold up his end of the bargain.

=== First business and marriage (1866) ===
In 1866, Arnold and his youngest brother Ludwig set up a business in Hauset (die Kupfermühle, a vacant copper mill at the river Geul). Because they didn't have the thread to weave nor money to buy it, they decided to dye thread for the industry, but there was too much competition from the industry in Eupen and Aachen. In 1873, Arnold married Anna Küppers from Aachen and later that year their first son Peter was born. Luckily, that year, money and cloth from the inheritance became available, but because of the competition from Eupen and Aachen, the Verviers textile industry started selling its cloth dirt cheap, so the brothers didn't find any buyers for the cloth. From pharmacist Knittel (a distant relative) in Vaals they heard that a new orphanage in Heerlen ('het St Jozephsgesticht') could do with someone to teach the orphans a trade like weaving. This pharmacist also bought his herbs from Heerlen and since Anna had worked at her father's gardening business she figured she could also package and sell medicinal herbs and could take over that business. In March 1874, the brothers went to the St Joseph market in Sittard with samples of the cloth to try to sell it, but were unsuccessful due to the competition from the Belgian Vesdre-manufacturers. Following Anna's advice, they returned via Heerlen, to speak to the rector of the orphanage, monseigneur Savelberg. (They stayed at well-known Hotel Cloot at the corner of Bongerd and Emmastraat – Arnold's son Peter would later marry Christine Cloot.) Since Savelberg took a long time to decide, Arnold's old plans to go to either Russia (where his brothers were) or New Orleans in the USA were reconsidered. Anna didn't like the former because of Wilhelm's stories of hard work and inexperienced colleagues. But New Orleans appealed to her because according to an old Wanderbursche-friend of Arnold, Joseph Kops, who had emigrated there, there was a great need for artisans in the United States. In May they had even already started informing about the price of such a trip (cheapest option 160 Belgian Francs per adult plus 15 GFrancs for the baby) when word finally came from rector Savelberg. So in August 1874 they went from Hauset to Heerlen with three looms and some cloth.

Although Heerlen is only 35 km North from Kettenis, transportation in those days wasn't much different from mediaeval times (largely by stage coach or on foot). So the travelling distance was much greater than it is now. But the cultural distance was much smaller. Both Kettenis and Heerlen had been part of the Duchy of Limburg for centuries. The then borders between the Netherlands, Germany and Belgium had only recently been drawn (see Treaty of London, 1839) and regional sentiments were still much stronger than any national feelings. Limburgers still felt closer to nearby Germans than to Hollanders. The Duchy was even part of the German Confederation from 1839 to 1866 (just 8 years earlier). Arnold never naturalised and even his grandson Pierre (see #Spin-offs) had German citizenship until shortly before the Second World War.

== Foundation of the Firm by Arnold Schunck (1874) ==
When the German weaver Arnold Schunck (* Kettenis 11 February 1842, † Heerlen, 15 October 1905) and his wife Anna Maria Küppers (* Aachen, 20 January 1843, † 20 November 1930) arrived in Heerlen on 25 August 1874 to set up a textile factory and a cloth and spice shop in the Willemstraat ('op d'r Schramm', later housing a branch of grocery chain Edah) they had the good fortune that the coal mining industry was on the rise and Arnold realised that those miners needed a constant supply of sturdy clothing. In March of that same year, 1874, there had been some prospecting for coal (by v.d.Slik & Co from Dordrecht) and there were many requests for concessions between 1872 and 1880, so it is quite possible that Arnold had heard of these developments and based his decision to move here partly on the possibility of a rising industry. The mines would, however, only start up around 1900, so Arnold, who died in 1905, never experienced the growth of Heerlen they caused. Still, the business managed to flourish. One important reason for this was that despite Heerlen's small size (around 5000 inhabitants), it functioned as a centre for this largely agricultural region, with several government offices, the postal service, schools and some small industries. But most importantly, the major regional markets were held here, twice a week, at the Church Square, which the surrounding businesses profited from, and it may be that especially this latter fact was another reason the young couple came to set up shop here. Also, Heerlen was already the textile centre of the region.

This first shop consisted of just one large room with rolls of cloth on one side and the herbs on the other side. Arnold, more of an artisan than a businessman, could remain focused on weaving because his wife, Anna Schunck Küppers dealt with the business-side of the shop. She had given up the spice section after just a year. With the little money they had (900 Thaler) they bought a small farm next to a brook (the then still clean Caumerbeek) in nearby Schandelen where Arnold could clean the wool he bought from the sheepfarmers. Apart from three looms for woollen clothing he had a fourth for a sturdy cloth called 'thirty' (used for farmer's clothing and sturdy skirts). After starting with the aforementioned orphans, Schunck later hired more weavers (first Mosterd and later Merckelbach and Huub Koolen). But due to the success, still later, Schunck started buying cloth (from Aachen and Mönchengladbach) instead of weaving it all himself and ultimately he gave up commercial weaving altogether because a small handweaving business could not compete with the textile industry in Tilburg and Twente. So the planned weaving factory never really came off the ground. Instead, Arnold Schunck switched to clothes manufacturing (for which Eykeboom and Einerhand were hired), including ready-to-wear clothing (a novelty for Heerlen), and continued with the shop. With success, despite stiff competition from eight textile businesses in nearby Aachen, which regularly advertised in the local newspaper 'Limburger Koerier'. So Anna had switched from selling herbs to selling cloth (later aided by the children) and Arnold had switched from weaving to buying cloth and clothes-manufacturing, decisions that proved to be fortunate.

=== Second shop (1882) ===
The shop moved to a bigger building (bought from pharmacist Knittel) at the Kerkplein (Church Square) in 1882. This was a much more strategic location because the market was held at the Church Square. The looms were brought along and remained in service for another 6 years until rector Savelberg called back the orphans for internal affairs at the monastery, after which the commercial weaving was abandoned altogether. The shop did so well that the clothes production could not keep up and Schunck started buying clothes through a connection in Groningen. The sale of herbs by Anna was also abandoned when they moved into the new shop, possibly because this business was taken over by friar Aloysius.

In 1893/1894, the new shop was torn down and rebuilt, extending it further to the back, joining it with other buildings Schunck had bought. A novelty was the use of concrete and shopping windows, 2 by 3 m, quite a sensation at the time for such a rural town and a prelude of what was to come later (see Glaspaleis below). In 1903, another extension took place, and around 1910, the house next door (South side) was added to the shop (designed by architect Seelen Sr.).

The location next to the market was ideal and the business kept growing. Especially good customers were the miners, as anticipated, but also farmers, who bought large batches of cloth and clothes when visiting the Sunday market. Some came to the shop only once or twice a year, with carts that were loaded full of cloth, which the farmer's wife would then make clothes out of (ready-made clothes were rare at the time). At first the children helped out selling in the shop, but by 1900 that didn't suffice and for the first time sales personnel was hired (resident, as usual at the time). In 1903, just before Arnold's death, the legal status changed to a general partnership, known as the Firma Schunck (later a Naamloze Vennootschap). This way, the children that worked in the shop could share in the profits. Another reason was that two daughters were to become nuns and this legal construct avoided their convents sharing in the inheritance.

Being more of an artisan than a businessman, Arnold developed new types of cloth in his later years, even though weaving was no longer part of the business. Later, his designs would be bought by van Moorsel in Eindhoven. After his death, Anna kept the remaining cloth and a loom in a special attick. When his grandson Pierre, who had also taken up weaving, wanted to inspect those in 1926, it turned out the loom and the books had been thrown out to make room. They had fallen victim to the success of the business, which was through most of its history looking for more room for expansion.

As Heerlen grew, a new market square was created, just to the west, at the Bongerd, a former canal that had been filled up in 1902. As a result, the business lost its prime location. Over time, the Schuncks bought more and more terrain and houses, to the north of the shop, toward the new market square, later culminating in the building of the Glaspaleis by Peter, who would still later start buying houses towards the south, until he owned the entire block in 1939.

== Peter Schunck and the Glaspaleis (1905) ==
Although Arnold Schunck was the founder of the firm, his son Peter Schunck (* Hauset, 31 October 1873, † Heerlen 13 July 1960) is regarded as the embodiment of the firm and even of the modernisation of Heerlen in general. When Arnold Schunck died in 1905, his son Peter Schunck took over, although, as before, his mother kept playing an important role and three of his sisters helped out in the business too. The business already had 60 employees and thanks to Peter's sense of business it kept expanding (300 employees in 1950 and 600 in 1960, the year he died), despite two world wars. A much quoted story to illustrate his business sense is that, when he was just a schoolboy, on one morning he sold 25 smocks. Apart from the clothes shop, he also had several other businesses, such as a steam laundry in Valkenburg, a marl and limestone quarry (because of the cement shortages in the war) and a company named the 'Meerssener Kalkwerken' (lime). He was also shareholder and secretary of the insurance company NV Heerlensche Glasverzekering-Maatschappij. Several of the businesses that were not part of the core business were sold after the First World War because they often turned out not to be profitable. (Later, in the 1970s, such diversifications almost caused the family to lose the company.) One company that was not meant to be directly profitable, but which aided the core business was the 'Zuid-Limburgsche Autobus Maatschappij', which by 1908 already owned three buses (on solid wheels), to transport customers for free from surrounding towns and Sittard and Valkenburg to the department store three to four times per day on a schedule, effectively providing Heerlen with its first regional public transportation. These were kept running for half a century. The city would only buy its own two buses in 1923, and then only for the immediate vicinity of the city.

A major boost for the region was the accelerated development of the coal mines when the national government stepped in where private enterprise had failed due to the huge long-term investments that are required for the development of mines. The Dutch government was afraid that the Netherlands would become too dependent on foreign (German) energy sources and bought all still unsold concessions in 1901. This led to the establishment of the State Mines, which caused a fivefold increase of the population of Heerlen in 30 years.

During World War I cloth became scarce and prices soared. Right after the war the market was so unstable that sometimes cloth bought for 12 Dutch gulden per metre had to be sold for only 7 gulden due to much better cloth imported from England. Stocks worth tens of thousands of gulden became worthless. Then, in the 1920s, prices plummeted due to stiff competition from nearby Germany, where the economy had collapsed, so some of that cloth bought at 12 gulden sold for no more than 80 cents. The German Mark had suffered an enormous inflation and was worth only one guilder cent. A suit that cost 70 gulden in Heerlen cost only 17 gulden in nearby Aachen, so people from Heerlen started buying there and local shops started going bankrupt. On top of that, the Belgian Franc also plummeted (although that hit Maastricht harder than Heerlen). As if that wasn't enough, before the war the de facto local currency had not been the Dutch gulden but the German Goldmark, so that's the currency that Schunck had its cash in. When that changed after the war and the mark (now Papiermark, paper mark) became virtually worthless, Schunck's assets were largely gone. But Peter Schunck survived. By the end of the 1920s, the business was profitable again, and very much so, despite competition from V&D and Hollekamp. he started buying houses again, such as a bed and carpet shop in 1929 (later to be owned by his daughter Leonie and renamed first Käller-Schunck and then Hiero).

While the focus of the firm remained clothing for the miners, much attention was also given to the other end of the market, classy clothing. Quality remained a major goal for both, with the house-brand Lion's Quality (in English) and the slogan Kwaliteit wint altijd (Quality always wins). In the 1930s, the workshops were closed and Schunck changed completely to clothes manufactured by others.

=== Glaspaleis (1935) ===
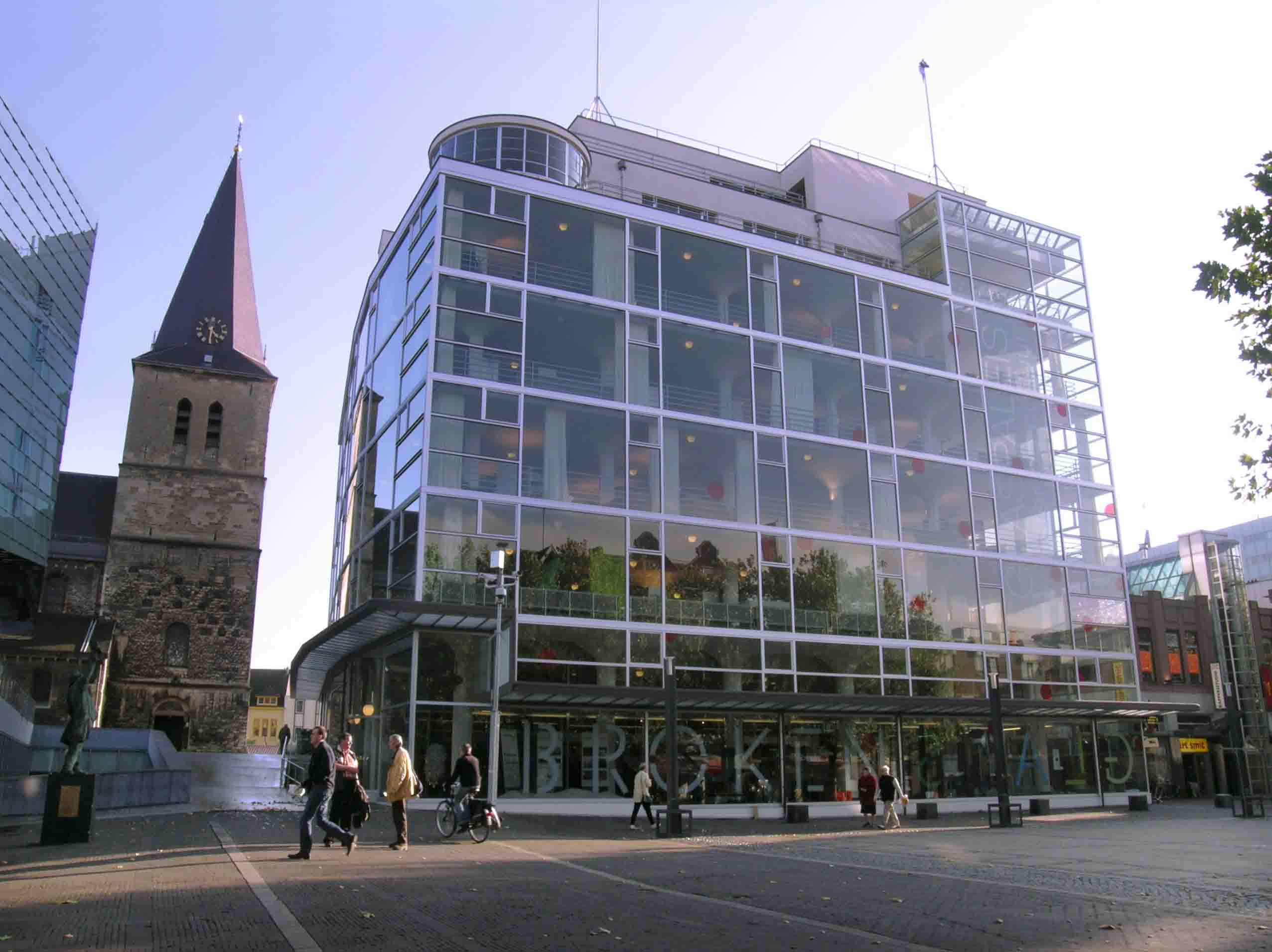
The front (North side) of the Glaspaleis today, as seen from the market square, Bongerd, with the music school annex and the Pancratius church to the left.

As the business grew, Peter started looking for ways to expand even more and in 1927, commissioned architect Henri Dassen to design a temporary wooden annex at the market square. This was not implemented, but both Arnold and Peter had been buying land and houses between the shop and the market square. This included the so-called 'dirty corner' ('vuil hoekje') at the corner of Bongerd and Church Square, and the city had been complaining for five years that it needed to be cleaned up. When the surrounding fence blew over in a storm in 1932, exposing the dirty corner, the City gave Peter an ultimatum; build something or have it disowned. Thus, the decision to build was speeded up, resulting in the Glaspaleis ('Glass Palace' or 'Crystal Palace') in 1935, a very modern building, certainly for Heerlen at the time, built entirely out of steel and concrete, with a freestanding glass encasing.

Peter Schunck had visited several department stores throughout Europe to find inspiration. He was most inspired by the architecture of a department store in Nantes, France, 'Les Grands Magasins Decré' by Henri Sauvage (1932), and thus the building was built in Bauhaus-style by architect Frits Peutz. Work started on 14 May 1934 and the official opening as Modehuis Schunck ('Fashion house Schunck') took place on 31 May 1935, but it was soon nicknamed Glaspaleis, which is now the official name.

During the opening, which drew 2000 visitors, the personnel offered a bust of Arnold Schunck. (In 1949, for the 75-year anniversary, they would offer another bust, of Peter Schunck.) Peter Schunck stressed that this was not a warehouse, because Schunck would stick to its core business and not introduce new products (as was done later in the 1964 store, not too successfully).

The purpose of the hypermodern, functional building was to create an atmosphere of a market, with all goods (cloth, clothes, carpets and beds) exposed in the shop instead of back in the stock-room, a rather revolutionary idea at the time. As, before, the shop windows of the old shop had been. Heerlen was still a rather provincial town at the time and when at one time some mannequins stood there unclothed that caused a bit of a scandal. This shopping-window idea was taken to the extreme in the new building. The result was a structure of stacked and covered 'hanging' markets, protected against the elements by the free standing glass encasing. The idea was to create a stacked market, like the market in front of it, but protected against the weather (at the time, traders at the market didn't even use covered stands – everything was just placed on the floor). For the arrangement of the displays, Alexander Ludwig, a famous window-dresser from Cologne, was hired.

Also controversial was the idea to undertake a project of this scale during the Great Depression, which was criticised by the then Minister of Finance Verschuur, saying that "Only a madman could put up a building like that during a depression. It is a foolhardy undertaking". In keeping with this line of thinking, the working week in the State Mines was reduced from six to four days. But Schunck's reasoning was the exact opposite. His reply was that this was exactly the right time for such an enterprise because the demand for employment was high, so labour was cheap. And it was a stimulus to the economy (a line of thinking that would one year later be promoted by John Maynard Keynes in a book that would make this a worldwide standard of economics for the decades to come). This expanded department store was the first incentive to Heerlen becoming the shopping centre for the southern half of the province of Limburg.

The Glaspaleis ('Glass Palace' or 'Crystal Palace') is named after its free-standing glass encasing on three sides (North, East and West), with natural ventilation thanks to the 50 cm gap between the floors and the glass, combined with the coordinated opening of certain windows. Not counting the two cellars, the building has eight floors, including a two-floor penthouse for the family with nine children (although only four ever actually lived there), with a roof terrace for the public. At the time it was (apart from the church tower) the tallest building in Heerlen (it was even called a 'skyscraper' in a 1949 newspaper article, even though it was 'only' 27 m high), and from the penthouse the Schunck family could see Aachen, 20 km away, burn at the end of World War II.

Because of its modernity it scared some people off, such as farmers, who were good customers (buying cloth in large batches to make their own clothes). So the old shop was kept open for them and their business went on as usual, with the shopkeeper fetching cloth 'from the back', except that now it often came not from the back but from the Glaspaleis.

A problem arose when Peter was buying the few houses at the planned location for the Glaspaleis at the 'Bongerd' (the market square). Department store chain V&D, which had opened a store right next to the site, to the West, five years earlier, bought one of the houses at the opposite (East) side of the location (Logister's umbrella shop) to hamper his efforts, but Peter solved this by simply building around it. V&D never made use of the house, which was located in between the old shop and the new Glaspaleis, leaving it to decay. It remained an eyesore until well after World War II. Schunck only managed to buy it in 1960, for the exorbitant price of 2,000,000 guilders. At that point, Schunck owned the entire block and was planning further expansion there.

Another long-lasting dispute arose over the space between the Schunck-block and V&D, where both Schunck and the City wanted to make a passage, connecting the Emma square and Bongerd. The city had agreed to this after Schunck offered to pay for it. V&D had also taken it into account when it built its store and talks between Schunck and V&D were initially fruitful, but when Schunck built the Glaspaleis, V&D tried to hamper those efforts too, resulting in a long-lasting court case over the ownership of the sewer and former canal under it (both the Bongerd and Emma square used to be waterways). Schunck finally won this in 1961. When shortly after that the houses to the south (including the old shop) were torn down, the Glaspaleis became completely free standing. For more on how the Glaspaleis fared after that, see Glaspaleis#Decay and renovation.

Ironically, when Schunck had finally achieved the goals of buying Logister's old shop and getting the passage, the City started a new project to the west, the Promenade and persuaded Schunck to expand there instead (see below).

In 1940, Peter Schunck set up a clothing factory in Heerlen at Geleenstraat 73 in a former mill (and consequently named 'De Molen') under the name Schunck's Kleding Industrie Limburg (SKIL). This factory focused on work clothes for the miners, but during the war also manufactured clothes for people in hiding and even had a Jewish manager, who lived in hiding in the attic.

When World War II came, Peter saw he had a potential problem, still having German citizenship, which was not unusual in this city so close to the German border. So he quickly naturalised himself and his son Pierre to Dutch citizenship. During the war Pierre Schunck was leader of the Valkenburg resistance (which he started). During the war bombs destroyed the glass windows three times, the last time at new year '44/'45, when the Glaspaleis served as headquarters for General Patton. It was later also used by the French resistance group the Maquis. The blemishes remained visible until years after the war. Each time the glass was replaced, but after the last bombing that lasted until 1949. After the war, the Glaspaleis was also used to sell 'relief clothing' at cost.

=== Post-war (1945) ===
To celebrate the 75-year existence in 1949, Schunck gave a fireworks display the likes of which Heerlen had never seen before, visited by tens of thousands from all over the region. Special anniversary coins of 100, 50 and 25 cents were made at the Mint in Utrecht, to be distributed among customers who spent a certain amount of money. These could be used to get a 5% rebate or later that year (in November) used as normal cash for purchases. Some of these were made in silver and kept as a curiosity.

After the Second World War the business continued to flourish. In 1949, it had 300 employees. The coalmines, which were at the heart of the reconstruction of the Netherlands after the war, made Heerlen the industrial hub of the region. In the 1950s the miners were relatively well paid (considering normal workers wages of the time) and Schunck consequently made a separate section for miners' clothing, where the 'koempels' (miners) could spend their clothing coupons. Advertisements specifically targeted the miners, also with the slogan 'Kwaliteit wint altijd' ('quality always wins'), despite the suggestion of upper class (who were also targeted with the products on sale).

In 1953, a new shop was opened across the Bongerd, the Markthal (Market Hall), which was of a different type, with selfservice, a new phenomenon, and with bargain prices. In 1954 a new branch was opened in nearby Geleen (at the Rijksweg), the future industrial centre of the region when the Dutch State Mines (DSM) moved there as a petrochemical industry. Expansion reached even further, with the firm buying clothes shop chain Wassen, with three shops in the Holland region (Amsterdam, The Hague and Rotterdam) and in 1948 Peter's oldest son Pierre had started a clothes factory on the Caribbean island Bonaire (see under 'Spin-offs' below). But the biggest change took place in Heerlen. In 1964 the main store moved to another, huge, building at the newly established Promenade (see next section). The Glaspaleis became specialised in interior decoration textiles. In the process the entrances were improved and the lifts renovated. It was kept in use by Schunck for a few years, but then rented out to the ABP state pension fund, that needed a temporary housing until its own was completed. In 1973, the Glaspaleis was sold. For details on how the Glaspaleis fared after that see Glaspaleis – Decay and Renovation. In the previous 2 decades, Schunck had already bought several houses around the Glaspaleis because it was growing much too small for the amount of business it saw. To the South, at the Emmaplein, connecting to the Glaspaleis (though the old shop) and housing the administration in a former bank. To the East, former Hotel Cloot, where Arnold Schunck stayed when he decided to set up shop in Heerlen, and which now housed Schunck's baby shop. Schunck had bought these to expand around the Glaspaleis because. But the city had plans to start a shopping centre to the West, at the new Promenade and convinced Schunck to build there instead. And finally to the North, two more former hotels had been bought and renovated, first the former Limburgia Hotel, at the opposite side of the Bongerd, and then the former Neerlandia Hotel at the Saroleastraat, which now housed the 'Market Halls'. At the Limburgia Hotel, a shop had been opened for mattresses and blankets. This merchandise was now moved to the Glaspaleis. This freed it up for renovation, merging it with the Market Hall, which would be turned into a self-service discount textile shop.

Now that Schunck was going to move to a new building, several of Schunck's buildings around the Glaspaleis, plus many other buildings, including the entire block to the south of the Glaspaleis, were going to be torn down to create parking space and 'breathing room' for the Pancratius Church. As a result of this, the Glaspaleis would become completely free-standing (however, later, the space created to the east would be built up again). The Schunck buildings that were to be torn down were, to the south:

- the old shop, which had lastly housed interior decoration
- 'huize Canter' (former Twentse Bank), which housed the administration
- 'pand Savelberg', next to huize Canter
- 'het Spinnewiel' (formerly café Lindenlauf)

and between the Bongerd and the Church Square, several buildings bought after 1945:

- the former Hamburger Buffet
- Stienstra (panden Hennen)
- Keulaerts
- former Hotel Cloot

== Christine Schunck (1960) ==
Of the shares in NV Schunck, one third was owned by Chrisje Dohmen-Schunck, one third by Leo Schunck (these two formed the management) and the rest by other family members.

By the company's 75'th birthday, in 1949, Peter Schunck (one year older than the firm) was still the managing director. In the board of directors were also Peter's second oldest son Leo Schunck and his daughter Christine's husband Frans Dohmnen (director since 1948/01/01). Christine ('Chrisje', 1907–?) herself had already been working for the company for 25 years and operated as de facto manager, dealing with every aspect of the business. Peter Schunck wanted his oldest son Pierre to take over the business, but Pierre was more interested in technology than business. So when Peter Schunck died in 1960 at the age of 86, the business, which by then had 600 employees, was in name taken over by the second son Leo. In the 1930s, he had been head of the purchasing department and later he became a member of the board of the purchasing collective Faam in Amsterdam, of which Schunck would become the largest participant. Already in 1945 he had started acting as a director of the company.

In practise, however, Schunck was largely taken over by Christine, who had more experience with running the business. Right at the start she was presented with the problem that the inheritance was to be divided among eleven children. She asked her brothers and sisters to not cash in yet, but only the youngest two complied. On top of that, the State Mines closed in the 1960s, just when a big further expansion had been undertaken. Still, she had enough experience and business sense to let the business survive and even expand.

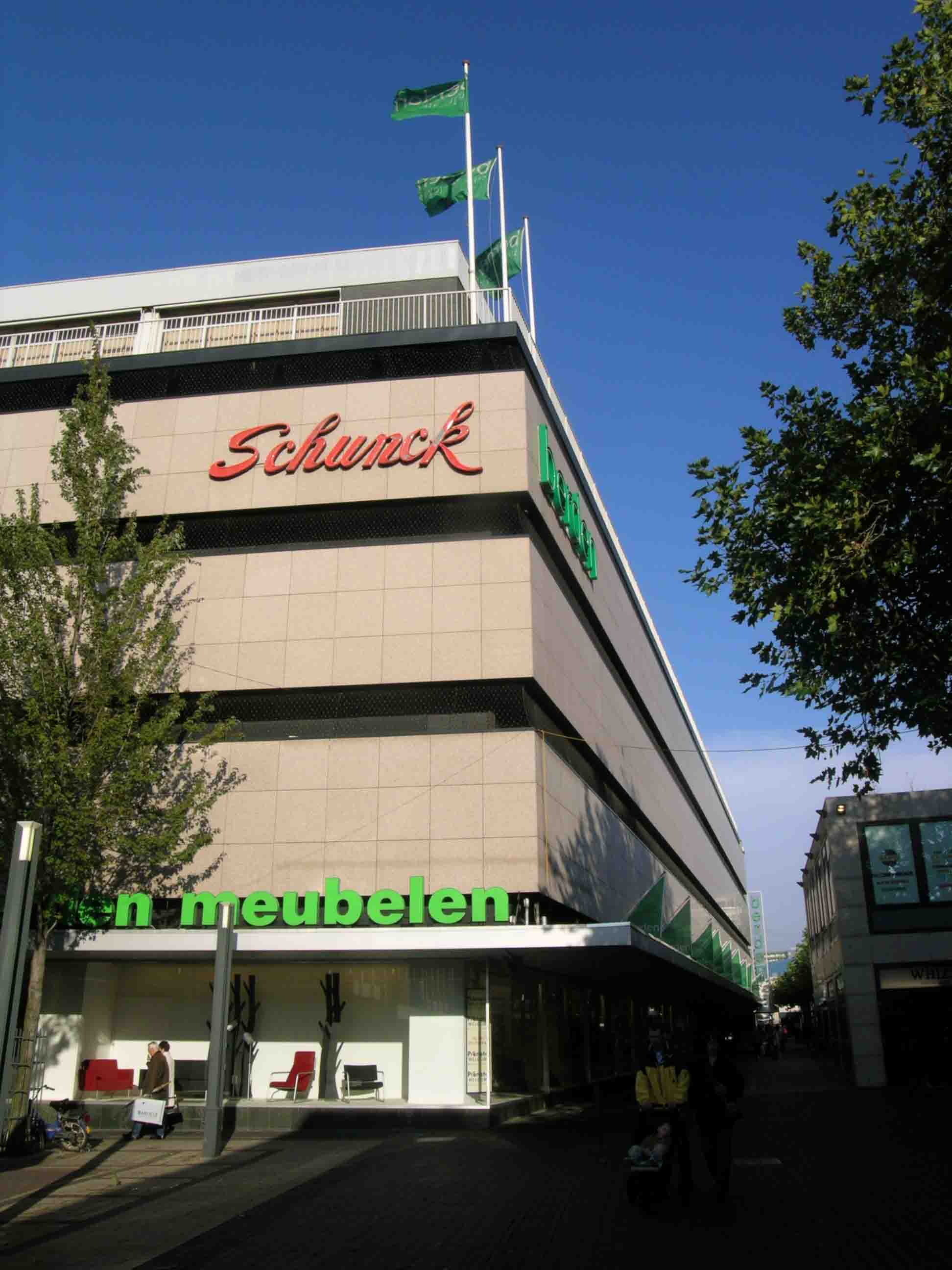
The last Schunck building, at the Promenade, now owned by Berden furniture.

The promenade store
height	30 m
surface	3000 m^{2}
volume	85.000 m^{3}
floors	7 (total)
total surface	20.000 m^{2}
publicly accessible	12.500 m^{2}
escalators	10
lifts	4
entrances	3
street displays	340 m^{2}
concrete	12,600 m^{3}
steel in concrete	10^{6} kg
electrical wiring	85 km
lights	5600
generators	12
outer wall marble	1900 m^{2}
architect	Eug. Hoen
architect's assistant	J. Roomans
interior architect	Jan van Bommel
building contractor	Melchior

=== Expansion ===
By 1964, personnel size of the now 90-year-old firm had increased to 700 at the main store, 125 in Geleen, and almost 1000 in total. On 16 September of that year Schunck expanded even further, when the main store moved to an even bigger building in Heerlen, about 100 m to the west of the Glaspaleis, at the Promenade, a big new project of the city, creating the largest metropolitan shopping boulevard in the south of the Netherlands. The opening attracted around 5000 visitors, causing local traffic delays.

The huge new building, which took a mere year and a half to construct, is 4 times bigger than the Glaspaleis, not in height but in surface area. The 10 escalators have a capacity of 10,000 people per hour. The building had cost around ten million gulden and was the largest store and one of the largest business buildings in the south of the Netherlands. As with the Glaspaleis, people also said of this new building that it was a foolhardy undertaking. The shopping capacity of Heerlen had grown to be much greater than one would expect from a town this size. As mayor Gijzels pointed out during the opening ceremonies, Heerlen now had the largest department store capacity per number of inhabitants in the country. (Conversely, the number of specialty shops was, at one per 77 inhabitants, actually much lower than the national average of one per 59.) But Leo Schunck said that it was a matter of trust in the future of the region. He pointed out that Heerlen was still growing and had developed into the shopping centre of the region, serving about 200.000 people (not counting nearby Germany and Belgium). And this region is in turn located in the heart of what is called the 'industrial triangle' of Western Europe, with a population of 40 million. Based on the European unification process, Leo Schunck even speculated on the economic opening of the borders. Considering that Dutch Limburg is a wedge that is bordered by Germany and Belgium, with Heerlen at its tip, even more customers could be attracted. But that unification process was to take place only decades later, shortly after the firm had ceased to exist, as a result of a treaty in nearby Maastricht.

Several authorities, including the minister of Economic Affairs Andriessen, had assured, or at least insinuated, that the continued exploitation of the mines was guaranteed. However, in 1965, many were already operating at a loss and from 1966 to 1974, they would all be closed, which would have its impact on all businesses, including Schunck.

For the new store (as with the Glaspaleis) inspiration was sought throughout Europe, including visits to the US and Sweden (especially the redevelopment of the Stockholm city centre and its effect on shopping was a good example because it was better adapted to the European situation). The new store wasn't just much bigger, but featured an extended assortment, a selection one would expect of a modern warehouse store. Clothing, Schunck's mainstay, was still dominant on floors 1 (children), 2 (ladies) and 3 (gents) (with 47 fitting rooms). In the Glaspaleis, customers were welcome to have a cup of coffee at the penthouse (serviced by the family themselves), but now this was professionalised to a complete lunchroom for 180 people at the fourth floor. The other half of that floor featured toys and interior furnishings, also something that was already present at the Glaspaleis. Offices and the canteen were on the top floor.
The new sections, however, were located at the two lowest floors. The ground floor featured merchandise like stationery (and many pocket books), perfume and suitcases and a patisserie with its own bakery (all self-service, except for the bonbons, which had to be weighed). The souterrain housed a 2600 m^{2} supermarket, with 7000 items on sale and an assortment ranging from Russian caviar to 70 types of cheese. Extra efficiency was achieved at the seven checkout counters by using two trolleys (and no conveyor belt). A cashier would move the items from one trolley to the other and the customer could then take that to one of the 53 'packaging tables' (with assistance for those who desired it), thus reducing waiting time at the counter. The region is known for its high demand for quality meat. The butchery in the supermarket had a total counter length of 45 m, and a freezer with a capacity of 10.000 kg of meat. This and the other cooled storage rooms (e.g., for fruit and dairy products) were serviced by a monorail, suspended from the ceiling. This, combined with automated weighing and packaging machines (with a capacity of 10,000 packages of meat per day and shrink-wrap for fruit) meant that the food did not need to be touched by human hands, which had its advantages for hygiene. Nevertheless, there were constantly 7 butchers at work.

Self-service was becoming the standard in shops, which was also reflected in the new store, and not only in the setup of the supermarket. In the old shop (opposite the church), customers would tell the personnel what they wanted, who would then show them examples. In the Glaspaleis, all goods were out in the open, so customers could browse for themselves. In the new store, this was taken one step further. In keeping with the rising individualism, personnel was instructed to only assist people when asked. And Schunck even advertised the fact that at the curtain stand customers could themselves pull out the curtains to inspect them. Apparently, this was not obvious at the time. The new store was set up as a collection of specialty shops. As with the Glaspaleis, functionality was a major issue, so the layout of the floors was such that people would easily find what they were looking for. For example, in the supermarket the displays ('gondola's') had a maximum height of 1.60 m, so one could oversee the entire floor from any position. The collection of returnable bottles took place at the entrance of the supermarket. And the corridors (2–3 m), escalators and stairs were made extra wide. However, an attempt was made to let Schunck remain Schunck, a regional family business, focusing on quality and service.

A major difference with the Glaspaleis is that the outer wall is not made of glass. Apart from the top floors, there are even hardly any windows. The traditional natural light solution of having a large central hall, cutting through all the floors, with a glass roof, was not chosen either because that would take up too much (expensive) space. This means that almost all the light has to come from lamps. The outer wall (except for the two upper floors) is made of marble, interspaced with horizontal strips of lamps that are lit at night. This gives the building a very horizontal visual aspect. Here too, functionality was sought, with no unnecessary decoration, but without giving the building the 'cold' appearance that many new buildings of the time had. As with the Glaspaleis, the floors are supported by columns, interspaced 8 m, with the outer columns 2.5 m from the outer wall. The roof of the top floor is steel construction. The gross floor height is 4.15 m on all floors, with a net height of 3.3 m. The building is heated with city heating ('stadsverwarming'), using mostly heated air, with a capacity of 2.5 MW. Air conditioning in the souterrain has a capacity of 35,000 m^{3} per hour, meaning the air is refreshed (and cooled) six times per hour. For the other floors that is 4 times per hour, except in the lunchroom and kitchen, where it is eight respectively eighteen times per hour (and not cooled). In total, every hour 304,000 m^{3} of air is transported through 3.5 km of ducts. The main entrance has an 'air curtain' with a capacity of 63,000 m^{3} per hour.

The building borders on streets on three sides, with an entrance on each street and featuring 340 m^{2} of shopping window space. These were used during the opening to display Roman artefacts, to illustrate the theme of the opening, the Romans, for whom Heerlen was a major settlement (Coriovallum) at an important crossroads. As a result, Heerlen was the major archeological site for Roman artefacts in the region. The idea for this theme came from drs van Hommerich, the City Archivist, an expert on the subject.

In his speech at the opening, the mayor announced that a street was to be named 'Peter Schunckstraat'. In 1967 it was decided that was to be in the new suburb Bautscherveld-De Rukker (located halfway between Heerlen and nearby Kerkrade). The street sign was placed even before building had started.

In 1966, Schunck bought the adjoining Neerlandia cinema (which was rented out to the Hirschberg-concern) and in the same complex Lindor Lingerie and the Promenade Restaurant (both also rented out).

=== Problems ===
Leo Schunck had started making plans for still further expansion, even going national. But over the next eight years, several setbacks caused the business to shrink from 825 employees to 500, 400 of whom in Heerlen. The yield had dropped by 20% over the previous few years. Thanks to some restructuring, the company did not have problems with liquidity yet, but that was thought to be just a matter of time. In 1966 the mines started to be closed (and another four were yet to be closed), although that was already known for some time and the employees were re-educated for the new petrochemical activities of the former State Mines (DSM) and several government officials and private entrepreneurs showed great confidence in the future of the region. Still, sales went down while wages kept rising. In the early 1960s Heerlen, with its industrial development and modernisation, was nicknamed the 'Rotterdam of Limburg'. Purchasing power was higher than in the rest of the Netherlands and relatively low prices meant that many shoppers came here from Germany. But the closing of the mines meant that 40,000 miners retired and unemployment in the region was high at 3000. Many left the region for jobs elsewhere and those that did find a new job locally got lower wages, often 20% less. From 1965 to 1971, the number of wage-earners dropped by 18.4% (at a constant population). Also, when the Glaspaleis was rented out to ABP, the stock there had to be sold too quickly at too low prices. And when, for insurance reasons, a new fire extinguishing installation had to be installed in 1970, that cost not only 800,000 gulden, but also a loss in sales.

Still, until 1969, Schunck did well. Then came the introduction of VAT. Repricing a stock worth millions is a tricky business. But a bigger blow was the reduction of purchasing power by 20 to 25%. And the Germans stopped coming because Heerlen was no longer cheap. And then there were several smaller problems, like too much (expensive) service. leo Schunck commented that smaller departments should have been sold earlier.

=== Survival ===
In February 1972 the sudden announcement came that Schunck would be sold (with the possible exception of two shops), but Christine Schunck took a great personal financial risk to prevent this and managed to let Schunck survive. A committee consisting of S. Huyben (State Mines), L. Horbach (House of Commons and Chamber of Commerce Maastricht) and drs G. Krekelberg was installed to find a solution. They had talked to several companies that might take over the business. Bijenkorf, which operated in the same high class market, decided against it because operation of the business wouldn't be profitable enough. So attempts were made to rent the building out in sections. Kreymborg, Etos and Neckermann looked into it, but they all dropped out. One issue was who was to get ground floor. Also, Schunck wanted to guarantee the continuity of the exploitation, so the warehouse would remain for the public and continued employment would be guaranteed.

In the end only arch enemy V&D remained, who wanted to take over the entire business. Warehouse chain V&D had already secured a monopoly in the other main city in South Limburg, Maastricht and the same would have happened in Heerlen. Earlier, there were three main warehouses in Heerlen, the third one being grand Bazar, also at the Promenade, which they had already bought (V&D's old store, owned by Vascomij, was elsewhere, at the Raadhuisplein, and they needed to find a new destination for that building first). Since this take-over would have included the Lindor shop and the Neerlandia cinema, V&D would then have owned the entire North side of the Promenade. These would have been connected to the already existing V&D store, which would probably have made it the largest V&D store in the Netherlands. The take-over would probably have led to the sacking of hundreds of employees. V&D didn't want to sack any of their own employees, so many Schunck employees would lose their job, probably hundreds, although a redundancy scheme was being negotiated with DECOM. Several former employees of the Grand Bazaar, already sacked by V&D after that take-over, had been hired by Schunck. So these were now at risk of getting sacked by the same company twice in a short time. The 50–60 employees of the supermarket, one of the more profitable departments, might have been be relocated to a new, independent, supermarket under the V&D store at the Raadhuisplein, thanks to government subsidies and credit offered by several food companies. The NV Schunck would also lose money on the stored goods (worth millions), because these would not be part of the deal and would have to be sold out quickly. The organisation of independent shops wasn't too happy with the transaction either because of the reduced competition and variation and because the smaller shops in the vicinity of the former V&D store would suffer a loss of customers if no other big attractor would come in its place (plans were to make it government offices).

But Christine Schunck managed to survive without such drastic measures. When gloom hung over the firm, the enthousiasm of the employees to keep on trying inspired the managers and then the committee came up with an alternative – sell just a few businesses, but not the main stores at the Promenade and in Geleen. Leo Schunck commented that losing the main store would have been too much of a blow to Heerlen. Also, selling the entire business would have disturbed the family relations too much. Everyone assumed that the buildings would be sold, but V&D wanted to buy all the shares and continue the business. In other words, under the same name. That would have meant that no-one called Schunck could ever set up even the smallest textile shop under their own name. This enraged Christine so much that she decided to go it alone. "If they can do it, then so can I". On 1 May 1972, Leo put down his function and on 14 July, Schunck became a BV (limited liability company)(based on a decision by the shareholders meeting on 24 April), with Christine as sole director, so she could keep total control. She bought all the shares and managed to keep the bank at bay by putting up her own money as collateral. With help of the Investment Bank and the government the business managed to continue. Christine did this at the age of 65, the retirement age for most people. Her survival scheme was to get rid of the departments that are not at the core of the business, starting with the supermarket, which was rented out to Etos.

Still, at the main store, 30 employees were fired, leaving a staff of 400.

In 1970, Schunck had rented out the Glaspaleis to the ABP and in 1973, it was sold. Schunck may not have lost its main store, but it did lose its main landmark.

After the closing of the mines, the government (personified by minister of economic affairs Andriessen) was actively supporting new industries in the region and better infrastructure was being developed.

=== Centennial and end ===
Thus, Schunck could still celebrate its 100th anniversary two years later. The regional economy had been decreasing for some time (according to the secretary of the Chamber of Commerce, Coenen, because of a sick infrastructure and a recession) and all local businesses suffered. But why not the likes of V&D, C&A and Hema? Quite simply because it was a regional problem and they could compensate their losses through their stores elsewhere and simply ride out the bad times. Schunck, however, only had two big stores, both in the same region. In retrospect, many wondered if Schunck would not have better stuck to its plans to expand around the Glaspaleis, because the Promenade store was simply too big and meant Schunck had to move away from its mainstay merchandise, clothing. Related to this, when asked about the causes of the problems, Leo Schunck mentioned the three Wassen shops in the Netherlands region, which were bought for a stronger purchasing position. But that didn't work because these were in a different genre. From 1964, they kept on running at a loss and were finally sold to NV Vinke on 15 April 1969. That same year, Leo Schunck said in an interview that specialty shops, big or small, were the way of the future. Schunck had been just that, and had to return to that philosophy, which had also been advocated by Peter Schunck.

Three years later, in 1975, after an interior reorganisation, Schunck was healthy again, with Christine as director and her nephew drs L.F. Verleisdonk as deputy director (and P.M. Notermans as executive secretary), focusing on clothing and interior decoration/furniture. This despite a continued unemployment and low purchasing power, although the latter had improved thanks to increased social security (under the government of Den Uyl). Around 1970, after the closing of the mines, there was so much uncertainty that people didn't dare spend what money they had. When things settled down, that brought continuity and people started spending again. Competing with giants like V&D and C&A, Schunck's smaller size gave it the advantage of greater adaptability. And Schunck didn't try to copy the big ones because it would have lost in direct competition. Instead (as always) it focused on quality and service (also after sales) and used the approach of a collection of specialty shops (of which there had been a lack in Heerlen) under one roof. There were also plans for more variation, such as a bank, post office or travel agency. There was still room left to rent out to such businesses.

New problems were on the horizon, though, such as the proposal of the unions to close shops on Saturday afternoons (which would align them more with other businesses). A national research had shown that that would have cost warehouses 6.85% of their turnover. But near a border that would be worse. On Saturdays, Schunck made about 10 to 15% of its turnover thanks to Germans, because in Germany shops were already closed on most Saturdays. Except for one Saturday per month, and on that Saturday customers from Heerlen would then go buy in Germany. And once acquainted with shopping there, they might return on other days too, thus reversing the situation. Also, a survey in the store showed that 20% of the customers preferred to shop on Saturdays.

And there had been experiments with making the shopping centre a pedestrian zone, which Schunck was a supporter of, but this was initially done in such a way that sales decreased. Verleisdonk said it was done exactly the wrong way around, closing the entire centre, only on Saturdays (of all days), without creating convenient parking facilities. Better would have been to do it bit by bit, starting with a small permanent pedestrian zone that is redecorated to look like one (with plants and such, not a 'normal street' that just happens to be closed off). Later, it was indeed done this way, with better parking facilities.

To ensure continuity, a strong partner was sought and found in Berden meubelen, a furniture store chain, which took over 6000 m^{2} in 1989. Christine Dohmen-Schunck ran the business until the age of 80, when the problem of succession presented itself again and the only person available to take over was her nephew Louis Verleisdonk, (Christine remained active in the business behind the scenes, though). After him, no one in the family wanted to take over and the business was taken over by Berden, who bought all shares of the 'NV A. Schunck' in 1995, and continued under the name Berden-Schunck.

Thus, the firma Schunck ceased to exist 121 years after the opening of the first shop by Arnold Schunck.

=== Aftermath ===
In 2001, boxes full of Schunck's archive material (12 m when put side by side), from Leo Schunck's personal collection, were handed over to Heerlen's City Archive, precisely on the day he died (at the age of 90). Some material dated back to the very first beginning, from 1873 (still in Hauset), a barely legible bill from a spinning mill for 96 Thaler. It also includes private letters, but Schunck being a family business, those contain information about the business as well. And in the photo albums, family photos and photos of the store are put side by side. The two were one.

On 2006/05/13, the top floor of the Glaspaleis was hired for a family reunion of the family Schunck, which included the two remaining children of Peter, Nolda Houben (1918) and Carla van der Made (1920) and most of his 47 still living grandchildren (he had a total of 50 who reached adulthood, all but one born in his lifetime). On 2009/06/20, a second reunion was held and plans are to hold one every 5 years.

On the latest building at the Promenade, the name 'Schunck' (which is still quite renowned in Heerlen) remained featured in large lettering on the front and back (see photo above) and even on pillars inside. But the outside signs were also removed in 2006. By this time, the Schunck-signs on the Glaspaleis had already been removed. In 2009, however, they were put back for the occasion of the family reunion that year and an official renaming of the building from 'Glaspaleis' to 'Schunck'.

== Spin-offs ==
Apart from the four consecutive shops in Heerlen and a branch in nearby Geleen, there were several other businesses more or less related to the main firm.

Pierre Schunck (1906–1993), the founder's grandson, didn't take over the business as was expected of him (although he was commissioner of the firm), but made his mark in other ways. He helped with the alphabetisation of Gypsy children in Heerlen. In the 1920s, he studied at a textile school. In the 1930s, he studied to become a priest for a short while (which was presented to him as an alternative to taking over the business). In 1935, Pierre came back from the monastery and was made director of a laundry in Valkenburg, which had been founded in 1904 by his mother's father, Pierre Cloot (1849–1933), and of which his father Peter J. Schunck was director since 1909. The laundry was sold in 1947, to E. Hennekens. During World War II he started and led the Valkenburg resistance under the assumed name Paul Simons, for which he was awarded the Resistance Memorial Cross. After the war, his father gave him money to start up a clothes factory in Bonaire (a Dutch island in the Caribbean), named Schunck's Kledingindustrie Bonaire. But he did this with a former colleague from the resistance, who turned out to be too much of an adventurer and the business failed. It did start to help fight local unemployment, though, something for which he gained some popularity on the island. After that he returned to Heerlen, where he was already managing director of SKIL since 1 January 1943 (the clothes manufacturing business he and his father had set up), but that turned out not to be sufficiently profitable. His final business was a gents' clothing shop in nearby Maastricht, Schunck Jr. CV, at Muntstraat 41. When he retired, he went back to his family's roots by taking up weaving as a hobby, which had been the family's profession for centuries, specialising in Koptic Double weaving and visiting Otavalo Indians in Ecuador to learn about their weaving methods. He died on 2 February 1993. He had named his third son Arnold, who consequently has the same full name as the firm's founder, his great-grandfather. This Arnold Schunck has started collecting information about the family online – see the external link below.

Verleisdonk opened a ladies wear shop in Geleen (Raadhuisstraat 23–25), which still sports a 'Schunck' sign in the original lettering.

Leo Schunck purchased the Markthal. From 19 September 1972 to 1 March 1981, his son Peter Schunck (who was consequently a namesake of his famous grandfather) was director of Peter Schunck BV. Peter's daughter Leonie (1911–1997) and her husband Arnold Käller (coincidentally also the same first name as the main firm's founder), started the furniture shop Käller-Schunck in Heerlen, which was later renamed Hiero.

Another shop to carry the family name was opened in 2004 by Peter's greatgranddaughter Maaike Hendriks-Schunck, Schunck Art & Bijoux, primarily business-to-business, making paintings and jewelry for clothing shops (in line with the family tradition), although private individuals can also have paintings and jewelry custom made.

== See also ==
- Glaspaleis for a different (architectural) approach of the most famous Schunck building.
- Valkenburg resistance and Schunck's Kledingindustrie Bonaire for more on Pierre Schunck.

== Sources ==
- aachen-webdesign.de (English, Dutch, German), just one of many pages on this site about the business and the family, some of which are translated into English (this page is about the Glaspaleis).
- Rijckheyt (Dutch), the City archives of Heerlen.

== Image gallery ==
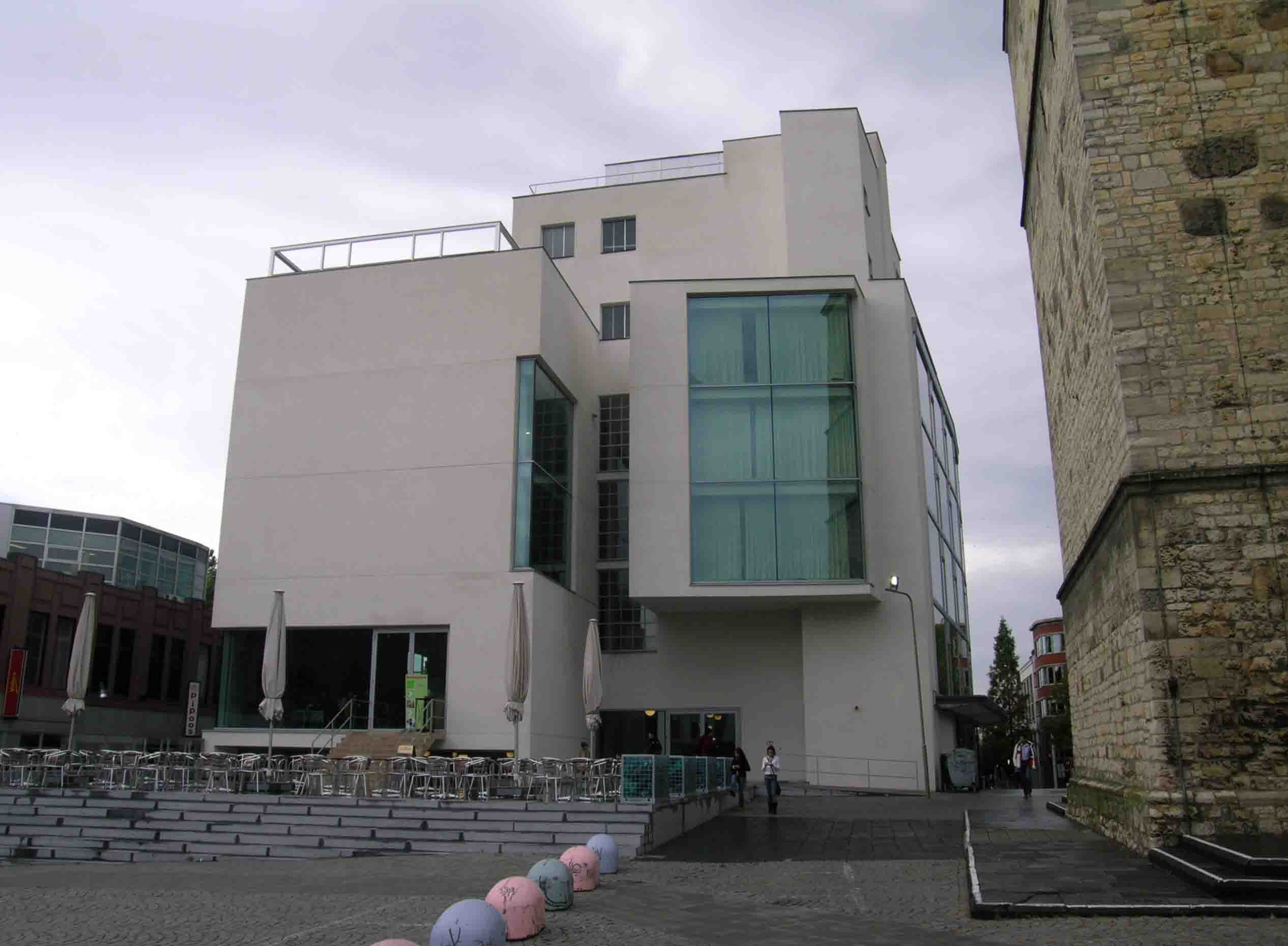
The back of the Glaspaleis, where the old shop used to be.
