= Schunck's Kledingindustrie Bonaire =

Clothing manufacturing on the Caribbean island of Bonaire

In 1948, Pierre Schunck (1906-1993), stemming from a family of weavers and son of the builder of the famous Glaspaleis in Heerlen, the Netherlands (see Schunck), arrived in Bonaire to set up a clothing industry (Kledingindustrie). This clothing manufacturing would become Bonaire's first real industry, providing employment—and health care—for a large part of the young women who were left behind when many men had left as sailors or to work for the oil companies on Curaçao and Aruba. Preparations for the operation of this company would also result in better electricity and water supplies; eventually it would account for half the exports of the island.

== Development of industry on Bonaire ==
Schunck had previously visited Curaçao and Aruba, but the conditions of employment were less favourable there. The government of the islands of Aruba, Bonaire, and Curaco (ABC islands) had planned large scale industry, trade and tourism for the two larger islands, and smaller industries for Bonaire, especially for the women. So Bonaire appeared to be a better choice. Since the existing salt processing and ship manufacturing were small scale, this was to be the first significant industry in Bonaire.

Because of this lack of development, there were no facilities or expertise to exploit, and workers had to be educated first. Schunck asked the government for the same perks that the industries on the other islands, including the rich oil companies, received (no import tax for 25 years), but he received no help there. So he turned to governor Piet Kasteel, asking him to provide the basic necessities, most importantly water and electricity. This was granted, but the supply of electricity remained unreliable for the next few years.

Another problem was that everything had to be imported, from machines and building material down to the simplest screws. And all products had to be exported because there was barely a local market for them. This was problematic due to the long supply lines and the then obligation to let all shipping go through Curaçao. After half a year of trial production (in the later Zeebad), the new buildings (400 m² in Kralendijk, which would grow to 900 m² during the first expansion) were finished on 17 August 1948. For this, Bonaire's first waterpipe had been constructed, from Pos Calbas to the airport, passing by the factory, with a hydrant in Rincon. For the people of Bonaire, the new electricity grid meant that refrigerators became an option. But to save diesel, the generator wasn't kept running after midnight. As a warning, the lights started blinking at 23.30 h.

Production focused on company clothing for large companies like Shell (a major employer on Curaçao) and uniforms for police and customs officials and the initial production capacity was 700 overalls, 300 trousers and 400 shirts, with a 45-hour work week. Work was organised by the bundle-progress specialisation system, which the women favoured because (unlike Dutch workers) they preferred not to rotate work.

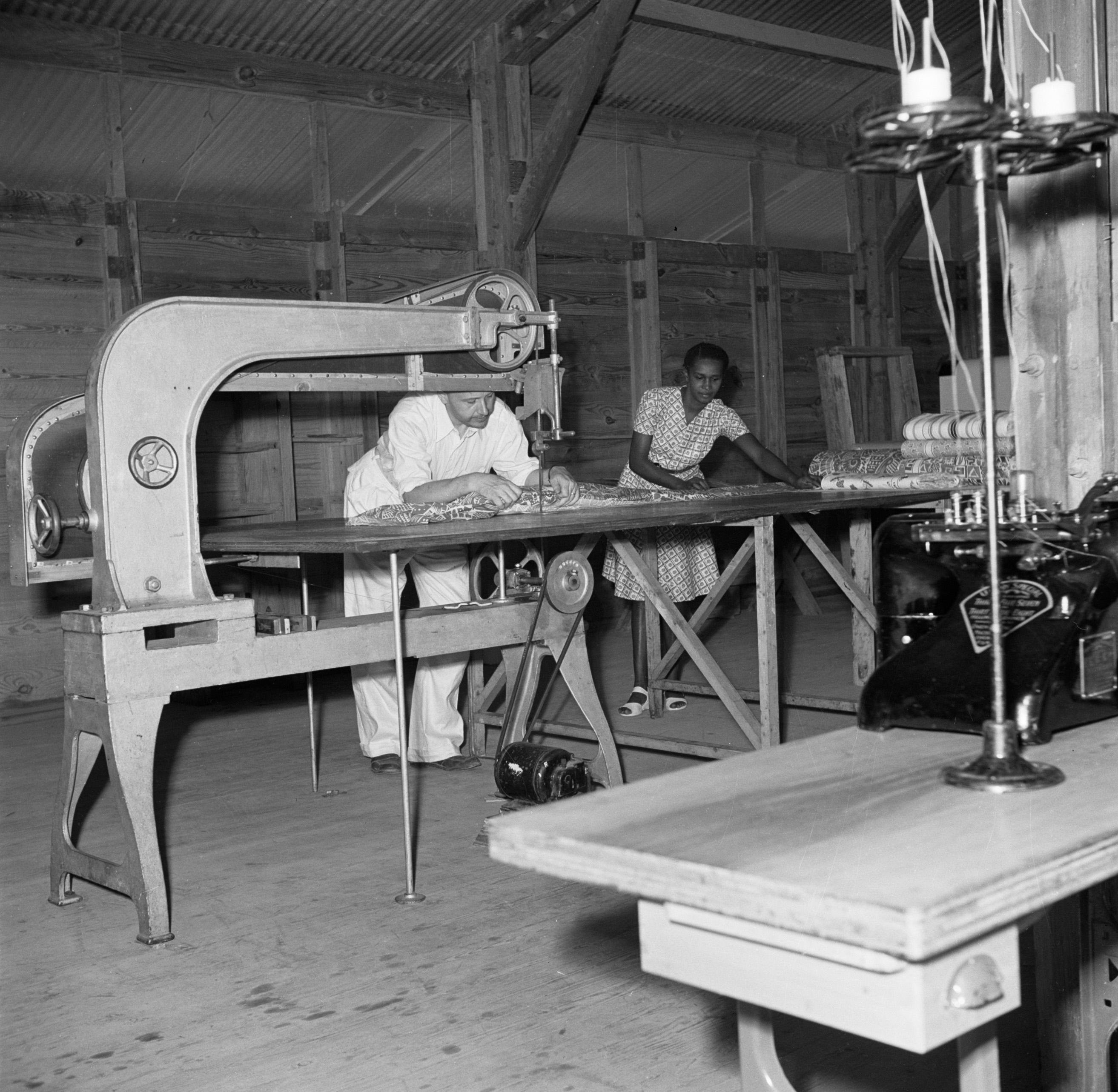
Een naaiatelier voor bedrijfskleding op Bonaire, Bestanddeelnr 252-8409

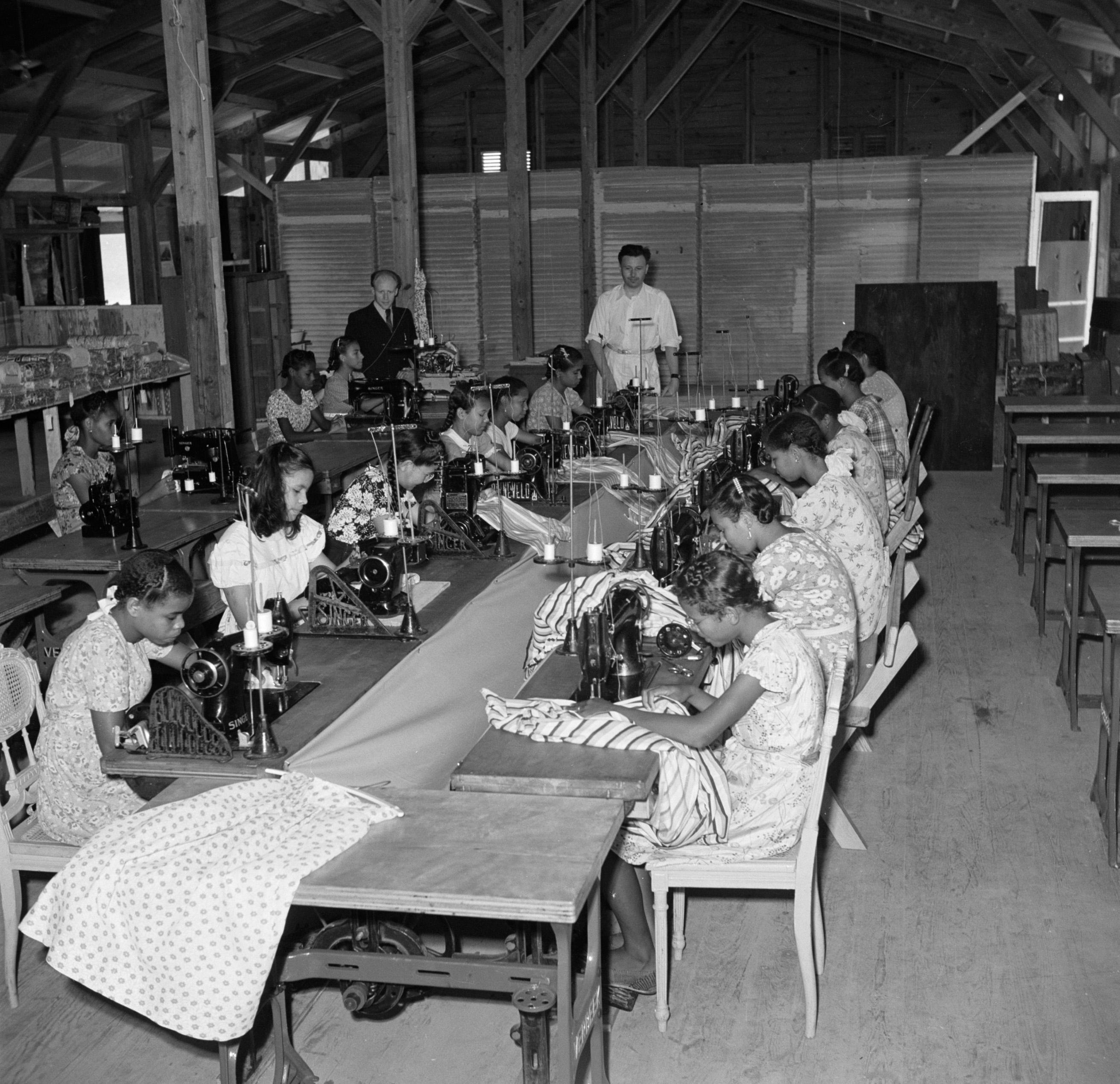
Een naaiatelier voor bedrijfskleding op Bonaire, Bestanddeelnr 252-8411

== Workforce ==
Because of the former relative lack of electricity, few knew how to work electric machinery, so two qualified men were hired to teach (initially) 10 women. By January 1951, there were 72 employees, 27 of whom experienced. The education had cost 70,000 guilders over that two-year period. Another year later, there were 110 employees. All overhead staff were male and all workers were female, but the former numbered only five and remained the same, while the latter grew in numbers, providing a major source of employment for the women on this small island. Export of the company's production was on average just over 200,000 guilders, which constituted about half the total exports of Bonaire.

But productivity was only 30% of that of European workers, due to Bonairians traditionally not being industrially-minded, the climate and resulting lifestyle, and the poverty and resulting malnutrition (worse than on surrounding islands). To combat the latter problem, Schunck introduced factory-paid meals and health care, with additional care at home for the employees’ families by the white-yellow cross, assisted by Pierre Schunck's wife, Gerda Schunck-Cremers. As a result, the mortality rate for young women dropped considerably:

Mortality rate for women
age group	1942	1955
0-19	8.7	2.3
19-50	3.7	2.3
> 50	27.3	36.7

== Decline of the industry ==
As a result of the high cost of education and health care, and lack of support from the Antillian government, the company had to be liquidated in 1954. But because closing the factory would cause serious unemployment, the Dutch government took over the company, and from 1955 to 1960 it operated under the name Bocofa (Bonaire Confectie Fabriek) N.V.

Despite the fact that this company received government support it could not cope either and by 1961 it started operating under yet another name, Cambes Textiles N.V. (the first letters of the six Dutch Antilles), of which all shares, worth 400,000 guilders, were in government hands. By 1975, there were 175 employees and the yearly turnover was over 1 million guilders.

In the early 1980s, the company had received a blow from the closing of the Shell and Lago refineries on Curaçao and Aruba, two important customers, and the number of employees had dropped to just 74. The Antillian government sold the company to Texport/Unitex for only a quarter of the estimated value of 1,250,000 guilders, to ensure continued employment for the women. But the new company was unable to remain viable and closed the factory on 20 December 1991, sacking all 85 employees.

== Historic effect on Bonaire ==
Ultimately, Bonaire turned out to be a bad location for a clothes factory. But for the women of Bonaire, who constituted a large part of the population, it was a blessing because it made them economically independent and socially emancipated. It had also laid a basis for other industries, with a better water and power infrastructure now in place.
