= Johannes Kaiser =

Johannes Kaiser may refer to:

- Johannes Kaiser (sprinter) (1936–1996), German sprinter
- Johannes Kaiser (Liechtenstein politician) (born 1958)
- Johannes Kaiser (Chilean politician) (born 1976)

== See also ==
- Johannes Kayser (1842–1917), Dutch architect
