= Johannes Kayser =

Dutch architect (1842–1917)

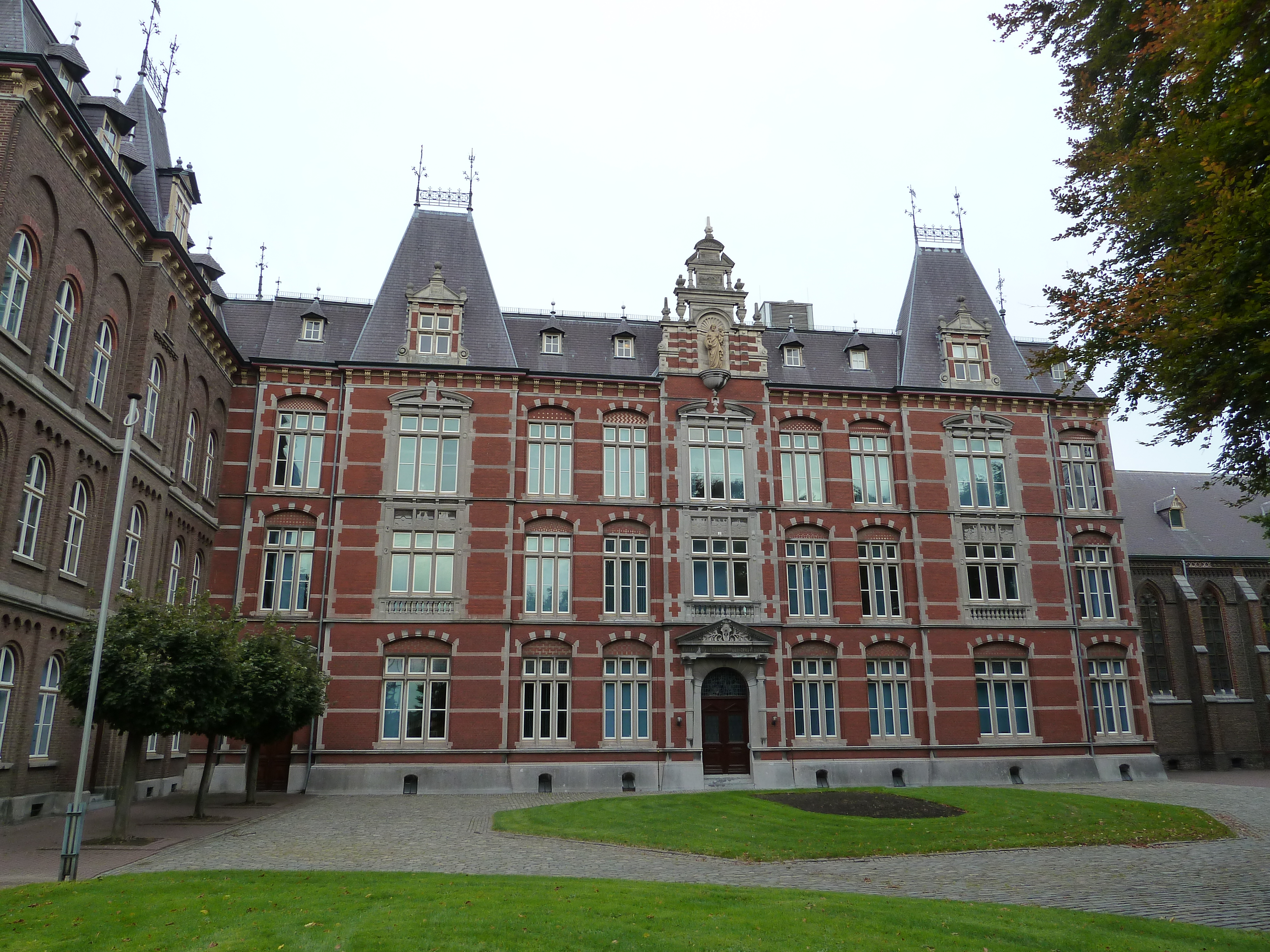
The International Museum for Family History (also known as The Ursuline Convent)

Johannes Hermandus Julius (Johan) Kayser (Harlingen, 11 November 1842 - 's-Hertogenbosch, 8 March 1917) was a Dutch architect, who was primarily engaged with the construction of churches. Apart from this he also designed schools and abbeys and oversaw many restoration projects. In the 1860s he worked together with P.J.H. Cuypers, for whom he functioned as supervisor during the restoration of the Sint-Servaaskerk in Maastricht.

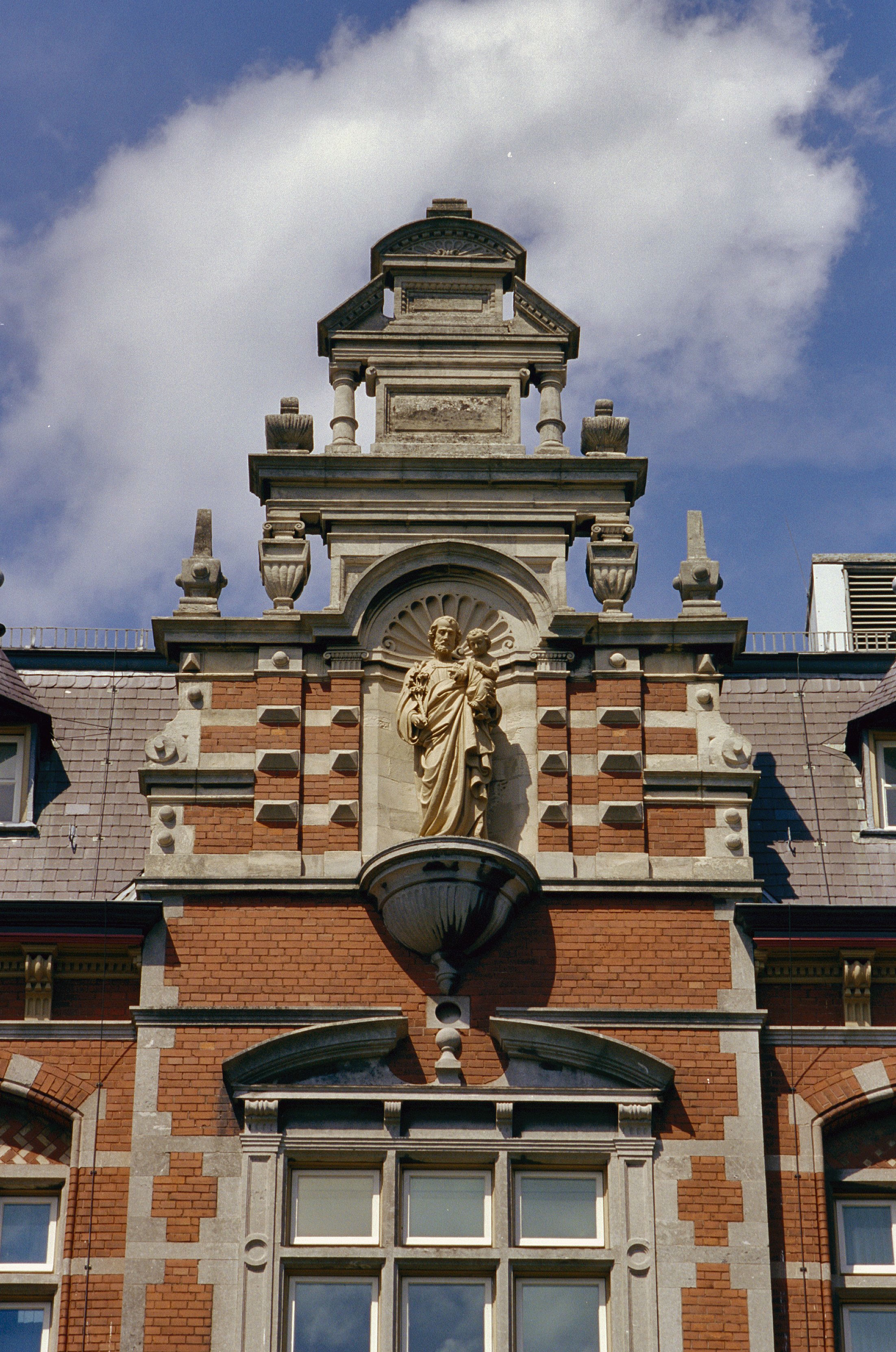
Detail of the convent's renovated facade, designed by Kayser and Cuypers

== Life ==
Little is known about his early life; at times his family name was spelt as Kayser, Kaijser, or Keyzer.

In 1873 Kayser established himself as an independent architect in the city of Venlo, where he reached the position of the city's official architect; in 1891 he moved to Maastricht. He became prominent for his churches and abbeys which were designed in a Neo-Gothic style. At first his churches were inspired by the French Gothic tradition, but after 1878 he turned more to the Gothic architecture of Northern Germany.

== Major works ==
Kayser designed his first church, St Pieter's in Maastricht, in 1892; he went on to design several churches in Sittard, Koningsbosch, Oud-Caberg, Posterholt, Reuver and Herten.

He designed the Joseph-Savelberg Monastery in Herleen in 1878.

During the 1880s, he worked on the Parish Church of Saint Benedict in Lozerplein and the Presbytery Saint Benedict Parish in Hamonterweg.

The Ursuline Convent in Eijsden (now the International Museum for Family History) was one of the major Neo-Gothic projects Kayser was involved in. The Ursuline sisters in Eijsden commissioned Pierre Cuypers to renovate and extend the building in 1899, and Cuypers turned to his old colleague for assistance in this project. The museum has dedicated exhibition rooms to the legacy of the Ursuline Sisters and the Neo-Gothic designs they commissioned.

His final known work was the former mayor's house in Sint-Michielsgestel in 1904.

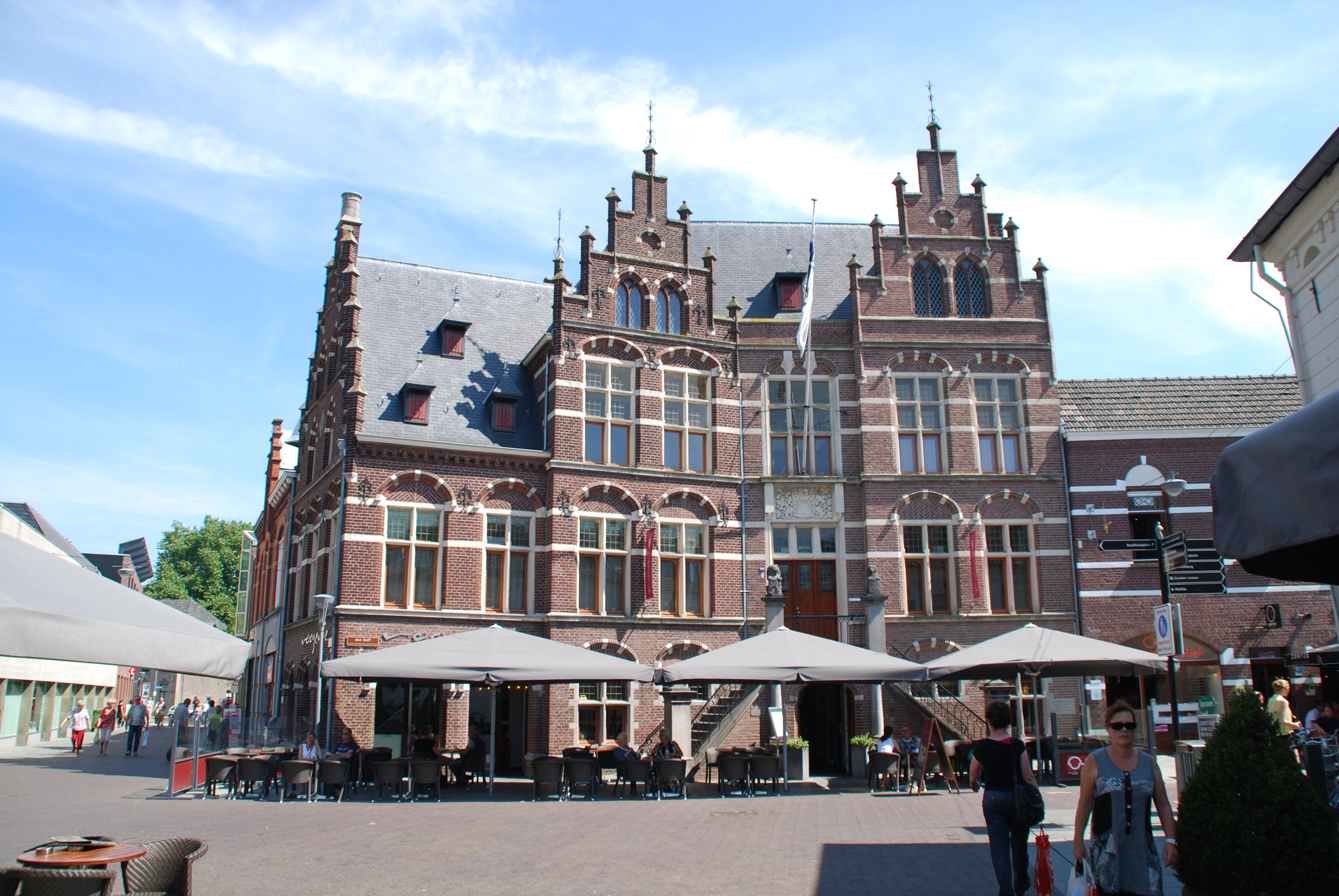
The Old Town Hall Venray (1884-1885), designed by Johannes Kayser and later amended by his son, Jules Kayser

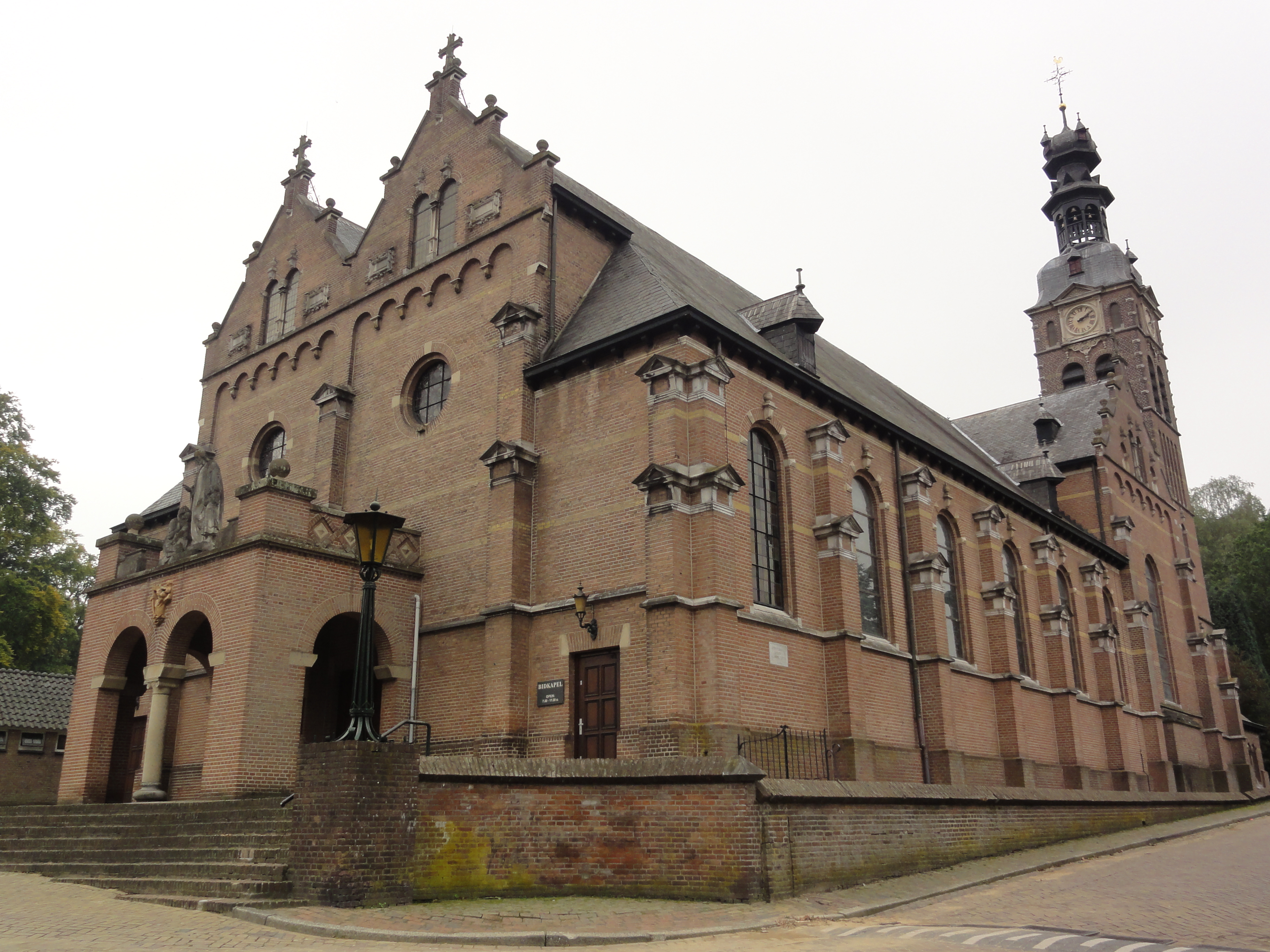
St.Bartholomeus the Great, Kerkberg 1 in Beek (Ubbergen), Rijksmonument 35784

== Family ==
He was the father of Johannes Henricus Julius (1879-1963), who was also an architect.

== See also ==
- Media related to Johannes Kayser at Wikimedia Commons
