= Valkenburg resistance =

Resistance movement in Valkenburg, Limburg, Netherlands

The Valkenburg Resistance was the resistance movement in Valkenburg, Limburg, Netherlands, during World War II. The majority of work done by the movement was dedicated to providing aid to those seeking refuge from prosecution by the occupying Nazi Germans. Sheltering Jewish refugees was punishable by death and one third of the people who kept them from Nazi punishment did not survive the war.

== Origin ==
When World War II broke out the Netherlands intended to remain neutral, as they had been in World War I. But when Nazi Germany nevertheless invaded in 1940, at first little changed and life went on fairly normally. There had always been Germans in this region so close to the German border and the Germans expected the Aryan Dutch would 'fall in line'. But then the Germans started imposing their ideology on the people, limiting people's rights, forcing people into involuntary labour internment (Arbeitseinsatz), and deporting Jews and others. These and other factors caused a growing group of people who wanted to resist the occupation, at first through individual acts like non-cooperation.

But activities such as helping people who had gone into hiding (e.g. to escape the Arbeitseinsatz), shot down pilots and escaped POWs needed more organisation. Small groups united into the Landelijke Organisatie voor hulp aan onderduikers (LO, National Organisation for help to people in hiding), which divided the province of Limburg in ten districts under Jacques Crasborn. Another organisation was the Knokploeg (assaultgroup) or KP. The KP would obtain goods needed for the people in hiding and the LO would then distribute them. In spite of the name the KP was not necessarily violent, but violence was sometimes needed in (mostly nocturnal) activities like obtaining identification carnets and ration cards and sometimes even German uniforms, which were used for raids.

The LO in Limburg started in Venlo in February 1943 under teacher Jan Hendricx (pseudonym Ambrosius). Another important figure was L. Moonen (pseudonym Ome Leo – Uncle Leo), secretary to the bishopric, who used his episcopal contacts to make the Limburg resistance an ordered organisation.

== Valkenburg ==
Head of the Valkenburg LO was Pierre Schunck (pseudonym Paul Simons). Notable members were Harry van Ogtrop and Gerrit van der Gronden. But many more people helped, more or less frequently, such as civil servants Hein Cremers and Guus Laeven, who, at the end of the war, 'lost' the population records when the Germans wanted to put all men between 16 and 60 at work digging trenches.

Pierre Schunck came into contact with the resistance because he lived across the street from a cave where people hid. When chapelain Berix Schunck visited there, he asked Pierre if he could get some clothes for the people in hiding. Which he did. But he went further by improving the living conditions (electricity and food). And in the end he decided to get more people involved and set up a resistance organisation, which hid a total of 150 people. At one point there even arrived a group of 100 people from the district of Maas en Waal, where there had been problems. Most of these could be hidden at several farms. Pierre Schunck's pseudonym 'Paul Simons' was a result of the at the time rather common custom to stitch one's initials into clothing and handkerchiefs, so the initials had to match. The fact that he chose a Jewish name is rather peculiar, though.

Apart from helping people in hiding, other activities took place, like raiding a store of radio equipment in Klimmen, a train full of eggs, and a dairy plant in Reijmerstok for a ton of butter. And hiding valuables from the Jesuit cloister in Valkenberg. One of the people who did this was Pierre Schunck, who owned a laundrette and simply hid the goblets and such under the laundry and put his children on top. At a hospital in Heerlen a whole floor was 'hidden' from the Germans to hide (and treat) crashed pilots and other people in hiding.

The many marl mines in South Limburg were also ideal hiding places because they needed a guide to navigate them (especially the ones in Maastricht have a very extensive system of corridors than has been used throughout history for this purpose). When Pierre's father Peter Schunck, who owned some land with entries to mines, where he knew people were hiding (which he chose to ignore), was asked by the Germans to lead them into the caves, he took them to a section he knew was dangerous and poked his walking stick in the ceiling, causing part of it to come down. Upon which he said he would not enter there. To which the Germans agreed. The caves were also used to hide guns (provided they weren't too damp) and as shooting ranges. And to imprison (possible) traitors.

There were also various other hiding places, such as the hide-out Pierre Schunck had created beneath his bath tub (the old type on legs), which he, however, never had to use.

At one point Pierre Schunck also had some rifles hidden in his laundrette. When one of his employees told the Germans about this and he was taken to The Hague for questioning, he played dumb and his good reputation saved him. The police sent a message to The Hague saying he was a respected citizen and because the rifles weren't found (they had been quickly moved) he was released.

== The raid on the distribution office ==
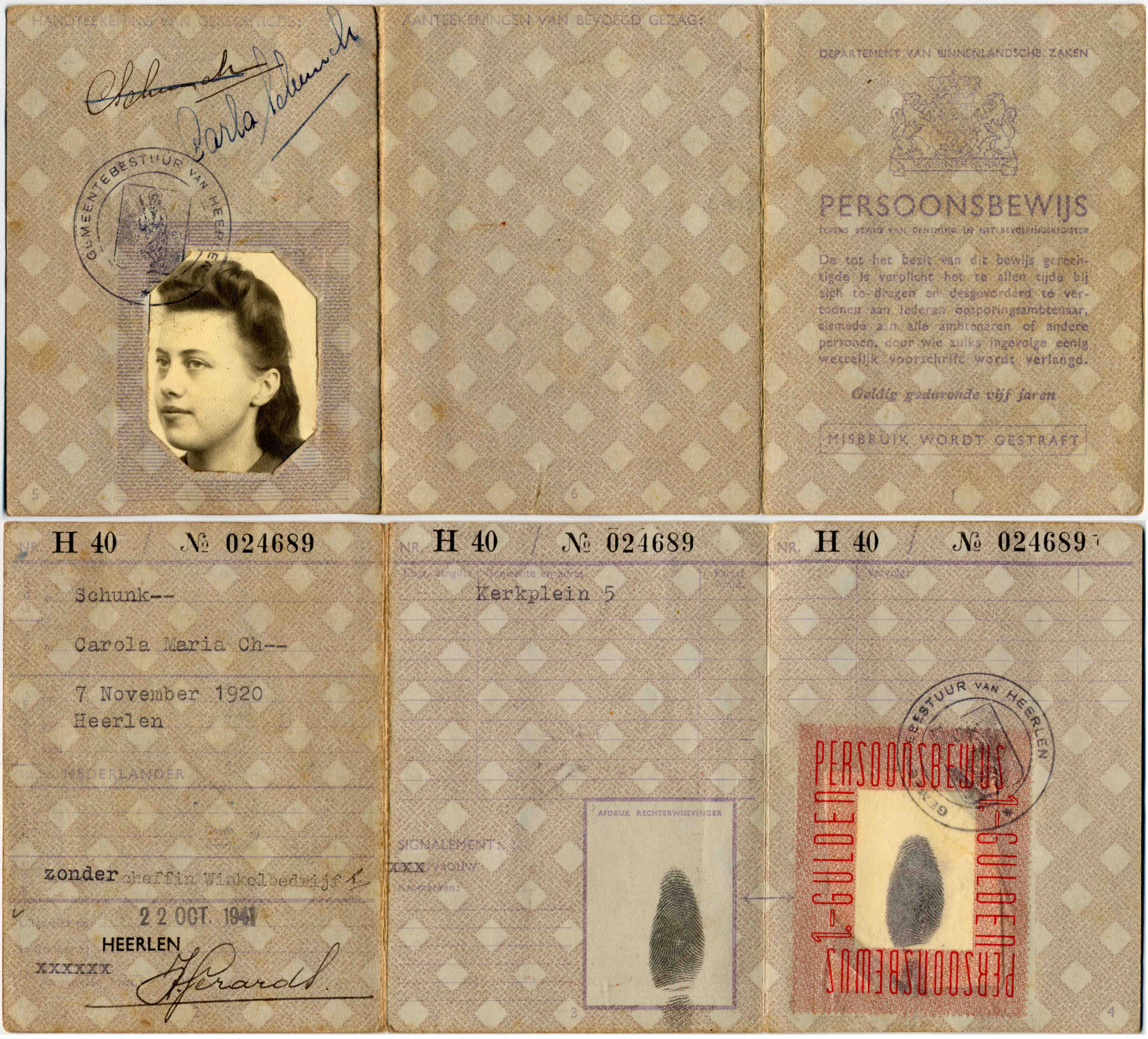
The two sides of a World War II 'Ausweis' or 'Persoonsbewijs' (identification) of Carola Maria Schunk

The ration cards were a means for the Germans to make it difficult for people to go into hiding, because they couldn't get any food. Young men who were to be sent to Germany for the 'Arbeitseinsatz' had to hand in their ration cards. But one way around this was to either fake the cards or steal them.

Some civil servants of the distribution office in Valkenburg (including Willem Freysen) managed to embezzle between 500 and 1000 complete sheets of ration cards per month, to be distributed among people in hiding. They even built up a surplus they gave to other districts. The manager of the distribution office had chosen to ignore this (another example of passive resistance), but when he was replaced in 1944, the scheme was found out and the ration cards were changed. An alternative solution was to have them printed in Amsterdam, but the printer's in Amsterdam was raided by the Germans. So a more 'aggressive' approach was devised, also to wipe out traces of the embezzlement.

Every night, an envelope with the keys to the vault (among other things) was handed over to the police for safekeeping. This envelope was sealed with stamps. Over time, enough stamps were collected (from the waste basket) to make a fake envelope with fake signature and keys. The KP had already stolen a car of the Wehrmacht from a garage in Sittard (plus some barrels of petrol), repaired it and hidden it in Valkenburg. So one night, when the fake envelope was handed to the police, this car, some German uniforms and the real keys were used to empty the vault at the distribution office. By chance, a new 2 month supply had just been sent in and the loot was enormous, filling twelve burlap bags. At first, these were hidden in a farm in Kunrade, but when the Germans started to search through farms, they were brought back to Valkenburg. The officer of the guard, who had participated in the scheme, went into hiding, thus drawing the attention to himself, giving the others freedom to go on with their work.

== Liberation ==
When the allies approached Valkenburg in September 1944 there were several days of shooting, with the result that when the allies entered the town on 14 September it was deserted; everyone had fled into the caves. But two men stepped out onto the street, one of them Pierre Schunck, the other a youngster from The Hague who was in hiding with him. They had made contact the day before and now told the 19th US army corps where the Germans were to be found - in a hotel near the only remaining bridge over the river Geul, at the Wilhelminalaan, which the Germans kept intact as long as possible to let their troops retreat. A column of jeeps approached and Pierre was put on the hood of the first one.

Later he found out that the soldier behind him had orders to shoot him if anything went wrong because they still didn't trust him. They were going to conquer the bridge, so Pierre sent off a few locals to tell people to stay indoors and not to start cheering. But the Germans were informed by a collaborating local and blew up the bridge just before the liberating soldiers had reached the bridge (creeping from tree to tree), by igniting the explosive charge that was already in place. So now Valkenburg became a front line and the troops were delayed for three days. The army division got orders to wait until Maastricht was conquered, which happened two days later. So on 17 September Valkenburg was finally on the right side of the front and fully liberated. The people could finally leave the caves, which was needed because during these few days food had run out and the hygienic conditions had become difficult due to the overcrowding of the caves. In those days in the caves three children had been born and an old man had died (of natural causes).

== After the war ==
Members of the Valkenburg resistance agreed to keep their activities a secret after the war, so as not to brag. This posed a problem for historian Loe de Jong when he wrote his famous Het Koninkrijk der Nederlanden in de Tweede Wereldoorlog, because he couldn't get any information. So he concluded there had been no resistance there. Ironically, the only person who was willing to talk was someone who had been on a death list of the resistance, but ultimately not executed. But the personal archive of Pierre Schunck proves the contrary, with photos, real and fake 'Ausweise' (identifications) and ration cards, illegal stencils, a file on Jewish victims and the like.

For his work in the resistance, Pierre Schunck was later awarded the Verzetsherdenkingskruis.

Years later, during a wake at the Margraten cemetery, a US soldier started asking around for someone named Paul Simons, but almost everyone had forgotten that name. When he finally found him it turned out he was the soldier who sat behind him with a rifle pointed at his head. He had had sleepless nights because of this and was happy to find Pierre Schunck in good health. This soldier was Bob Hilleque from Chicago, the only member of the A platoon of the 119th regiment who was still alive at the time. Pierre and Bob subsequently became good friends.

== See also ==
- Dutch resistance
