= Pierre Schunck =

Dutch resistance member (1906–1993)

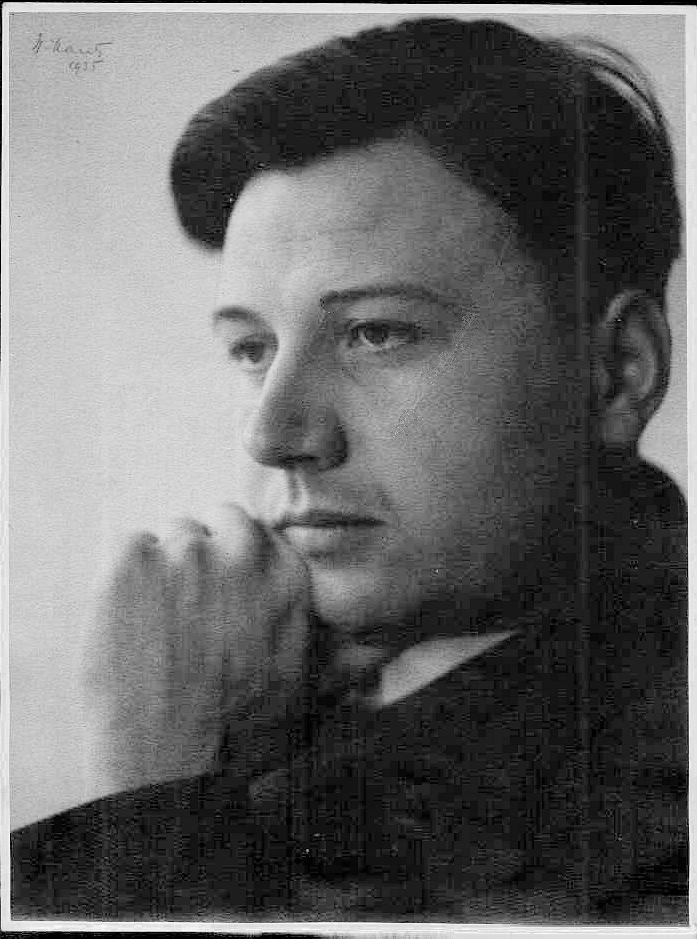
Pierre Schunck, 1935

Peter Joseph Arnold (Pierre) Schunck (24 March 1906 in Heerlen – 2 February 1993 in Kerkrade), also known as Paul Simons, was a member of the prosperous Schunck family who owned a department store at Heerlen in the Netherlands. He is mainly remembered for his involvement in the Dutch resistance in the Second World War when he hid a considerable number of Dutchmen from the Germans and assisted the Allies during the Dutch liberation.

Pierre initially studied to become a priest but soon joined the family business, initially running a laundry in Valkenburg near Maastricht. From the beginning of the German occupation, he decided to stand up against the Germans and became a member of the LO or Landelijke Organisatie voor hulp aan Onderduikers, a resistance group whose mandate was to assist persons in hiding. Under the pseudonym of Paul Simons, he headed the Valkenburg chapter.

He helped Jews and resistance fighters to hide from the Germans in his laundry as well as in the nearby Valkenburg limestone caves. Furthermore, he assisted both Dutchmen and Allies to move on by issuing them with ration books and coupons and providing them with safe addresses where they could hide.

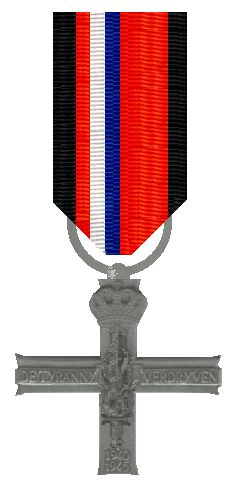
Resistance Memorial Cross.

At the approach of the US-American troops in September of 1944, as a member of intelligence group ID18, he provided the Allies first with reports on the German defences and later he organised food for the evacuated population of Valkenburg, who hid in the vast lime caves during the days of the liberation.

After the war, he returned to the family business and ultimately took up weaving for which he was considered to be an expert.

Pierre Schunck was awarded the dutch Resistance Memorial Cross or Verzetsherdenkingskruis for his bravery during the occupation.
