= Joseph Savelberg =

Dutch priest (1827–1907)

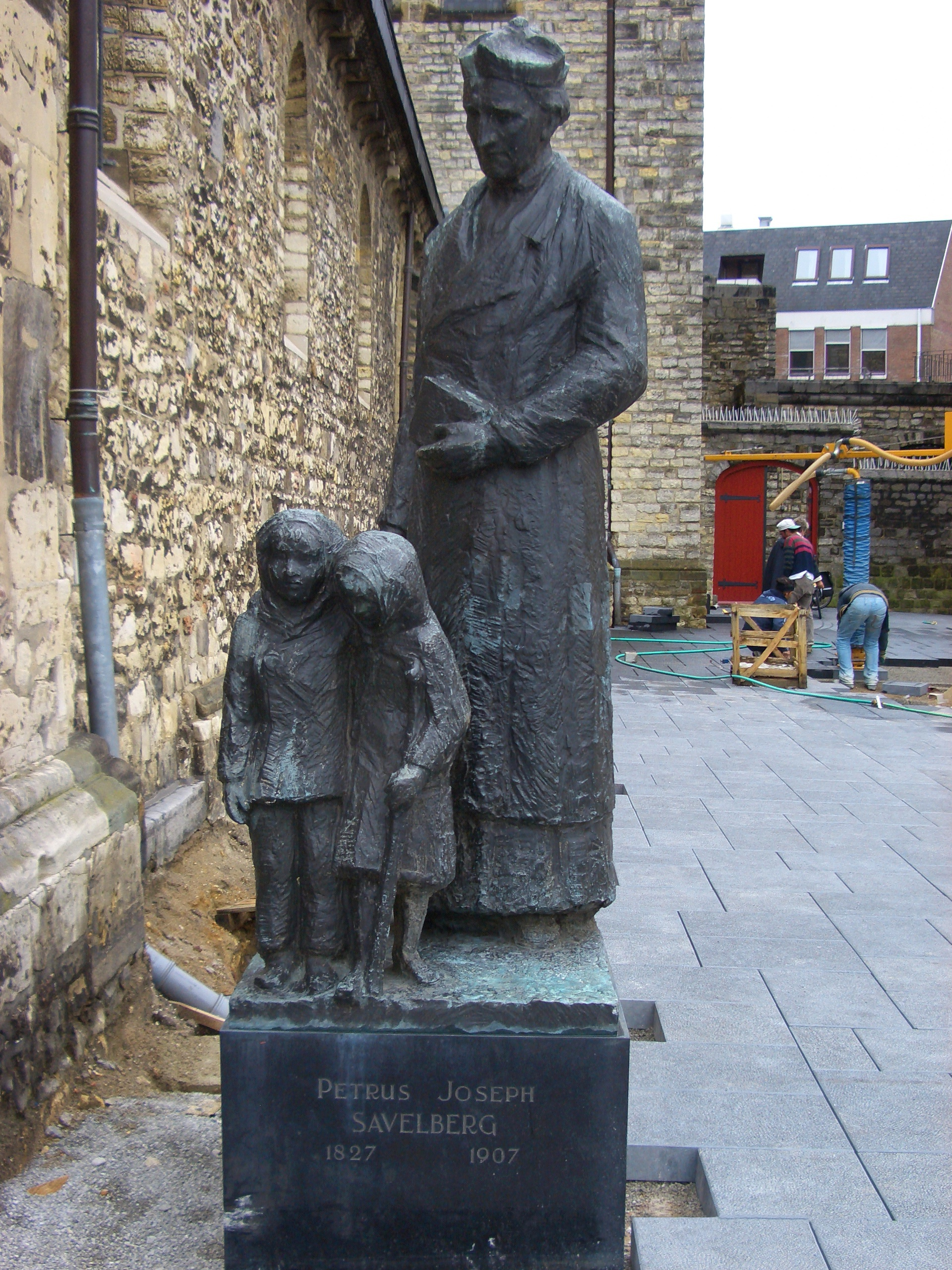
- Statue of Savelberg in Heerlen next to the Pancratiuskerk
- Church: Catholic Church

Orders
- Ordination: 1852

Personal details
- Born: Peter Joseph Savelberg; 10 February 1827 Heerlen, United Kingdom of the Netherlands
- Died: 11 February 1907 (aged 80) Heerlen, Netherlands

Peter Joseph Savelberg (10 February 1827 – 11 February 1907) was a Dutch Roman-Catholic priest and congregation founder (missionary).

== Early life ==
Savelberg was born on 10 February 1827 in Heerlen.

He attended school in Heerlen and after that at Rolduc (1843 to 1845). Leaving his brother Balthasar Savelberg, who was in charge of a glassmaking shop in Brussels, he returned to Heerlen because he could not adjust. Between 1846 and 1849 he attended Rolduc yet again, and after 1849 he gave seminars in Roermond.

== Career ==
In 1852, Savelberg was ordained as a priest. His first task was as a teacher at the Bisschoppelijk College in Roermond (1853–1856).

In 1856 he became rector of the Franciscans of Heythuysen, for whom he worked at the girl‘s school at Nonnenwerth close to Bonn. In 1863 the bishop called him back and made him chaplain in Schaesberg and in 1865 of the Saint Pancras parish in Heerlen.

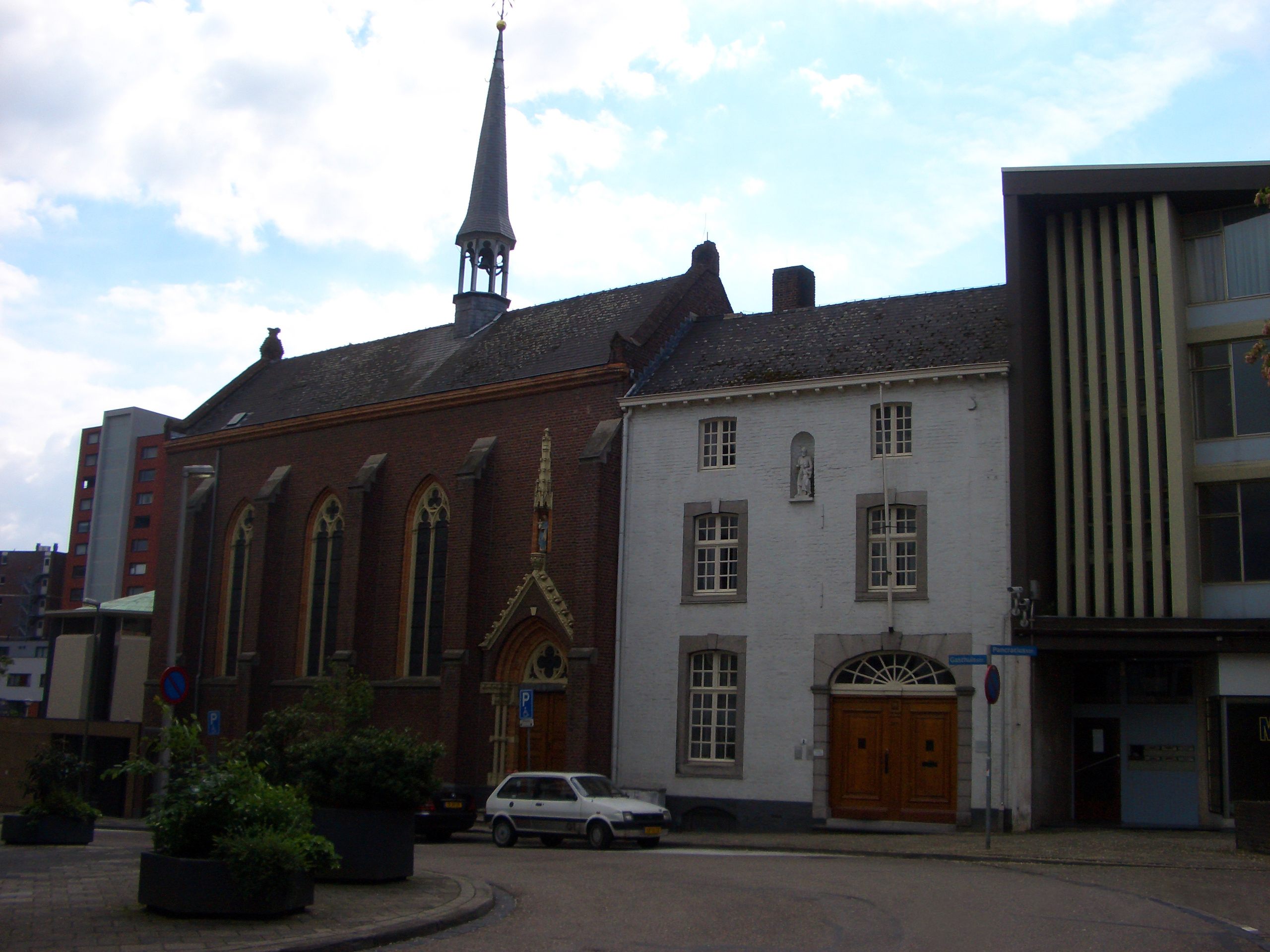
Former home of Peter Joseph Savelberg (white building)

On 21 June 1872, Savelberg founded the Little Sisters of St Joseph, a Franciscan order in Herleen. The chapel was designed by the architect Johannes Kayser. In 1937, the original house was renamed as the Joseph-Savelberg Monastery.

Savelberg worked with the Congregation of the Brothers of St Joseph and when the Little Sisters moved to a new building, the Brothers moved into their building in 1915. One of the most famous members of the congregation was Brother Aloysius, a naturopath and herbalist. Savelberg arranged for Aloysius to be trained under Sebastian Kneipp. In 2026, the garden at the Savelberg Monastery continues to be used as part of a well-being project.

== Death and legacy ==
Savelberg died on 11 February 1907 in Heerlen.

Local preliminaries for the beatification process began on 1 March 1937. Savelberg was later granted the title of Servant of God. In 1998, he was confirmed as Venerable.
