= Limburg (Netherlands) =

Province of the Netherlands

Limburg Limburg (Dutch) Lèmbörg (Limburgish)
- Province
- Province of Limburg; Provincie Limburg (Dutch); Provincie Lèmbörg (Limburgish)
- Flag Coat of arms Brandmark
- Anthem: "Limburg mijn Vaderland" "Limburg My Fatherland"
- Location of Limburg in the Netherlands

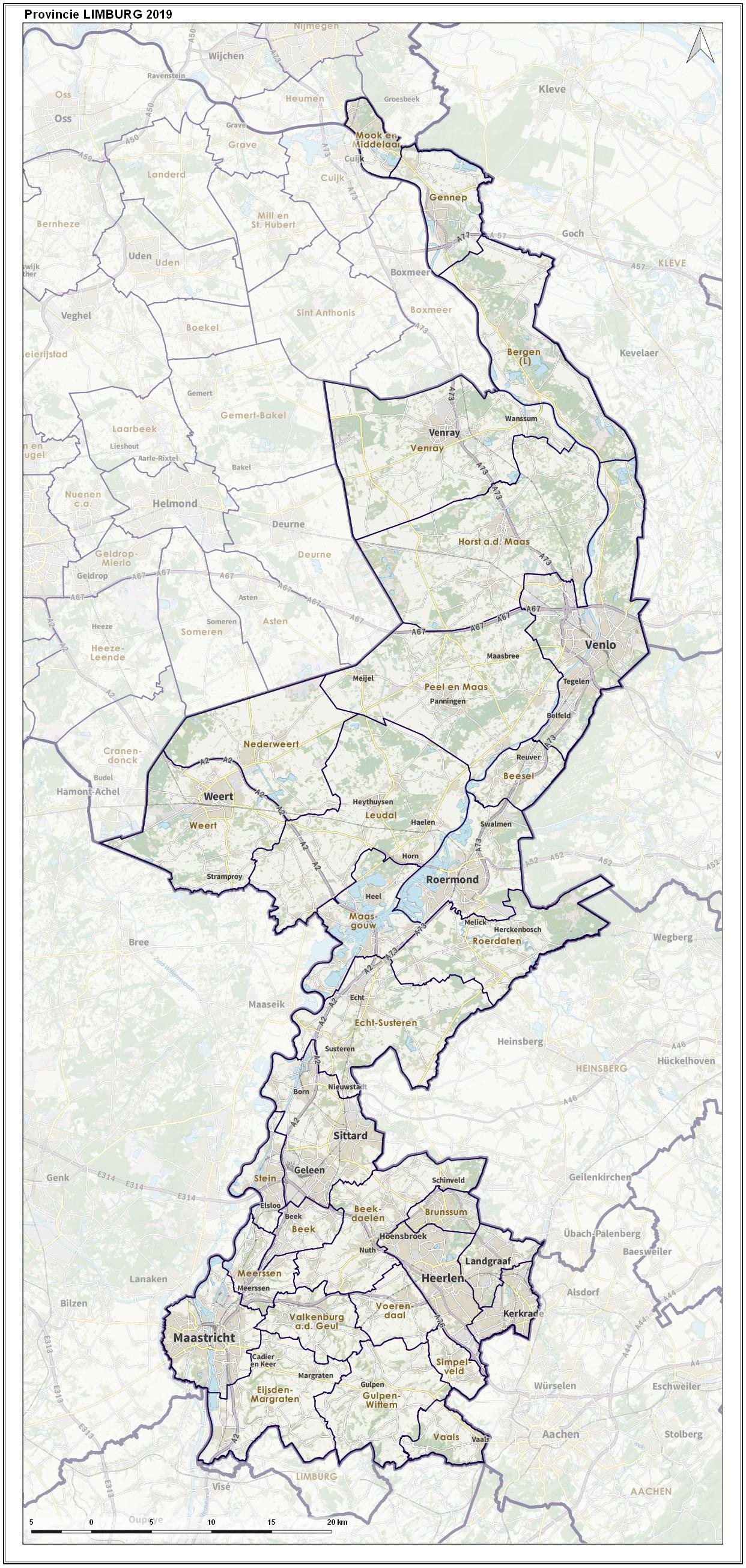
- Topographical map of Limburg
- Coordinates: 51°13′N 5°56′E
- Country: Netherlands
- Inclusion: 1867
- Capital (and largest city): Maastricht

Government
  - King's Commissioner: Emile Roemer (SP)
  - Council: Provincial Council of Limburg

Area (2023)
  - Total: 2,210 km^{2} (850 sq mi)
  - Land: 2,145 km^{2} (828 sq mi)
  - Water: 65 km^{2} (25 sq mi)
  - Rank: 11th

Population (1 January 2023)
  - Total: 1,128,367
  - Rank: 7th
  - Density: 526/km^{2} (1,360/sq mi)
  - Rank: 5th

GDP
  - Total: €58.267 billion (2024)
  - Per capita: €51,337 (2024)
- ISO 3166 code: NL-LI
- Religion (2003): Roman Catholic 78% Protestant 2% Others 5% Non-religious 15%
- HDI (2021): 0.927 very high · 7th
- Website: www.limburg.nl

Limburg (Dutch pronunciation: [ˈlɪmbʏr(ə)x]; Limburgish: [ˈlɪm˦ˌbʏʀ˦əx]), also known as Dutch Limburg, is the southernmost of the twelve provinces of the Netherlands. It is bordered by Gelderland to the north and by North Brabant to the west. Its long eastern boundary forms the border with the German state of North Rhine-Westphalia. To the west is the border with the Belgian province of Limburg, part of which is delineated by the river Meuse. To the south, Limburg is bordered by the Belgian province of Liège. The Vaalserberg is the extreme southeastern point, the tripoint of the Netherlands, Germany, and Belgium.

Limburg had a population of about 1,128,000 in January 2023. Its main municipalities are the provincial capital Maastricht (population 120,837 as of January 2022), Venlo (population 102,176) in the northeast, as well as Sittard-Geleen (population 91,760, bordering both Belgium and Germany) and Heerlen (population 86,874) in the south. More than half of the population, approximately 650,000 people, live in the south of Limburg, which corresponds to roughly one-third of the province's area proper. In South Limburg, most people live in the urban agglomerations of Maastricht, Parkstad and Sittard-Geleen.

== Etymology ==
Limburg's name derives from the Belgian fortified town of the same name, Limbourg-sur-Vesdre, now in the nearby Liège Province, immediately south of Limburg. The name of Limbourg-sur-Vesdre was important to the region because it had been the seat of the medieval Duchy of Limburg.

There are several proposals concerning the etymology of Limbourg. The second part, "bourg" or "burg" is common in placenames, and refers to a fortified town. The first part is often suggested to refer to lime or linden trees (species of Tilia). The historian Jean-Louis Kupper has proposed that its founder Frederick, Duke of Lower Lorraine named it after Limburg Abbey in Germany. He favours a derivation from a Germanic word "lint" meaning "dragon".

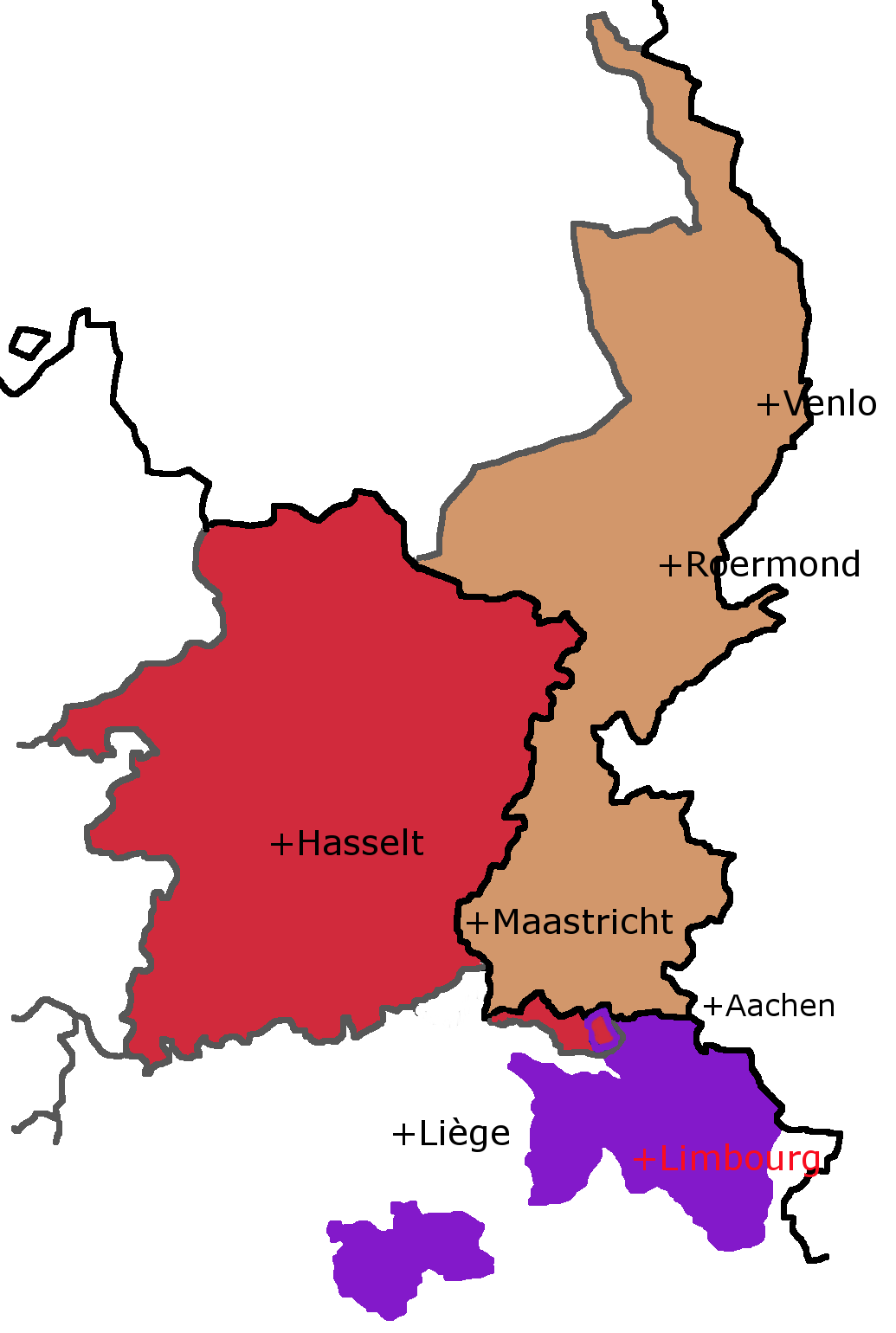
Map showing the two contemporary provinces called "Limburg" as well as the medieval duchy they are both named after. The small overlap is Teuven and Remersdaal, two villages in the eastern part of Voeren, a municipality in Belgian Limburg since 1977.

The area under the direct lordship of the old Duchy did not overlap the modern Belgian and Dutch provinces named after it, though the medieval Duchy was a high status title in the region. On the other hand, while the Duchy's effective power was limited, the Duchy and what is now South Limburg (referred to as the (Lands of Overmaas) did have a long history of connection under the lordship of the Dukes of Brabant. During this long period, from the Middle Ages until the French Revolution, they were sometimes referred to collectively under one name (Overmaas or Limburg).

After 1794, it was the French First Republic which unified the region, along with Belgian Limburg, and removed all ties to the old feudal society (the ancien régime). The new name, as with all the names of the départements, was based on natural features such as rivers, in this case Meuse-Inférieure or Neder-Maas ("Lower Meuse").

After the defeat of Napoleon, the newly created United Kingdom of the Netherlands desired a new name for this province. It was decided that the historic connection to the duchy of Limburg was to be restored, albeit only in name.

== History ==
The current province Limburg of the Netherlands only came into existence in 1839, after the finalization of the separation of Belgium from the Netherlands which had begun in 1830. The two Limburgs had been brought together under French revolutionary administration some decades earlier, but they and the surrounding region shared much of their history. For long periods of history however, the region was not united under the same rule.

For centuries, the strategic location of the current province, stretching along the Maas river route, made it a much-coveted region among Europe's major powers. Romans, Carolingians, Habsburg Spaniards, Prussians, Habsburg Austrians and France have all ruled parts of Limburg.

The first inhabitants of whom traces have been found were Neanderthals who camped in South Limburg. In Neolithic times, flint was mined in underground mines.

=== Roman era ===
Julius Caesar conquered the area in 53 BC, and wrote that he had extinguished the name of the Eburones, the inhabitants of most of the area of current Limburg, as a punishment for their revolt under Ambiorix.

The north–south route along the Maas was crossed by the Via Belgica, a road crossing South Limburg and connecting the two local capitals of Tongeren and Cologne. Mosa Trajectum (Maastricht) and Coriovallum (Heerlen) were founded by the Romans upon this route. The area became strongly Romanized. Bishop Servatius introduced Christianity in Roman Maastricht, where he died in 384. Maastricht appears to have taken over from Tongeren for some time as regional capital for the Romanized and Christian population, before the bishopric was re-established in Liège, 25 kilometres (16 mi) south of Maastricht.

=== Medieval era ===
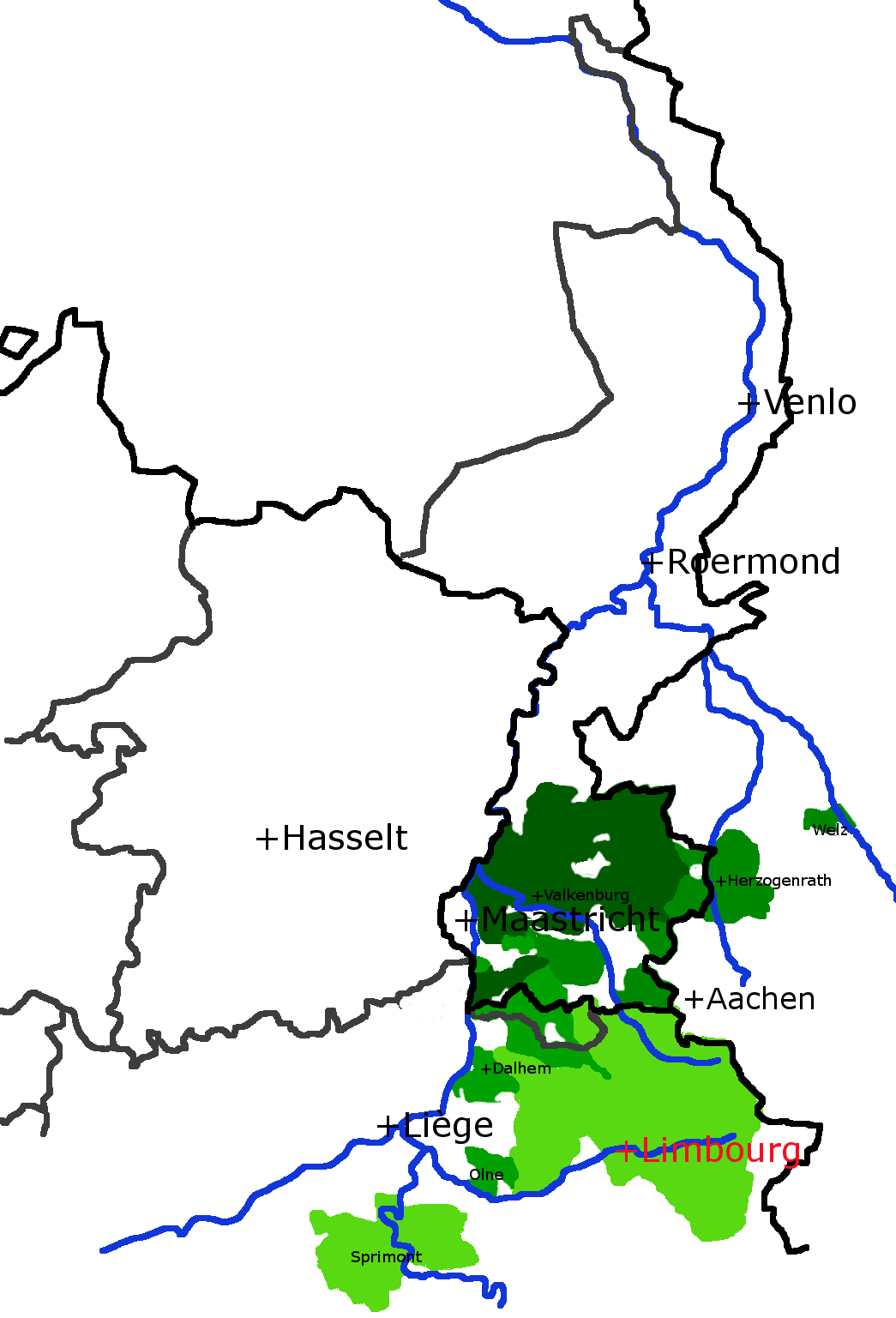
Map showing the medieval "lands of Overmaas" and the Duchy of Limburg, both in the Middle Ages possessed by the Dukes of Brabant. Together these formed one province in the Seventeen Provinces. (The dark lines are the modern borders).

As Roman authority in the area weakened, Franks took over from the Romans, but the area came to flourish under their rule, with Cologne continuing to be the most important local capital. The Maas valley, especially the middle and southern part of the current province, formed an important part of the heartland of Merovingian Austrasia.

With the rise of the Carolingian dynasty, who were themselves from this region, the Maas valley became more culturally and politically one of the most important regions in Europe. In 714 Susteren Abbey was founded, as far as is known the first proprietary abbey in the current Netherlands. The main benefactor was Plectrude, the consort of Pepin of Herstal. Charles Martel was born in nearby Herstal. Charlemagne made Aachen, today a German city which has suburban sprawl stretching into South Limburg, the capital of the Frankish empire.

After the death of Charlemagne, the Frankish dominions were again split between kings. While the Austrasian lands remained a separate "Middle Kingdom", sometimes now referred to as Lotharingia, in the treaties of Verdun (843), and Prüm (855), in the 870 Treaty of Meerssen, signed in South Limburg itself, Lotharingia was divided. The river Meuse became the border between the Western- and Eastern Frankish kingdoms, placing most of the current Dutch province of Limburg on the western boundary of the Eastern Frankish kingdom, with Belgian Limburg in the Western Kingdom. In the Treaty of Ribemont of 888, the Eastern Kingdom was granted control of the whole of Lotharingia, including all of the modern Netherlands and Luxembourg, and most of modern Belgium.

The region of Thorn, Netherlands was drained and about 975 a swamp nearby the Roman road between Maastricht and Nijmegen. Bishop Ansfried of Utrecht founded a Benedictine nunnery. This developed from the 12th century into a secular Stift or convent. The principal of the Stift was the abbess. She was assisted by a chapter of at most twenty ladies of the highest nobility.

During the period of West Frankish control under the Treaty of Meerssen, effective Frankish power in the area of the current Netherlands more or less collapsed. For two or more years a large Viking army, operating from a place on or near the Meuse called Ascloa (or Hasloa or Haslon), wrought havoc in the neighbourhood. The damage was such that the emperor, Charles the Fat was forced to assemble a large multinational army, that in 882 unsuccessfully besieged this island.

In the 10th century, the Eastern kingdom consolidated its control of Lotharingia and became the Holy Roman Empire. In the first decades of this empire the founding imperial family had close ties to areas in what is today northern Limburg. The emperor Otto III for instance was born in 980 in Kessel, practically on the current border between Limburg and North Rhine-Westphalia, just east from Gennep. In 1080 in Genneperhuis, just north of Gennep, Norbert of Gennep was born as a son of the count of Gennep. He was the founder of the order of the Premonstratensians. South Limburg in the early Middle Ages was mainly made up of the lordships of Valkenburg, Dalhem, and Herzogenrath. All of these lands were, however, united with the Duchy of Limburg, under the rule of the Duchy of Brabant, when they were known collectively as the Lands of Overmaas.

The Duchy of Limburg and its dependencies first came under Brabantian control in 1288, as a result of the Battle of Worringen, then in the 15th century under the Duchy of Burgundy. By 1473, the Lands of Overmaas and the Duchy of Limburg formed one unified delegation to the States General of the Burgundian Netherlands. Both the terms Overmaas and Limburg came to be used loosely to refer to this sparsely populated province of the so-called Seventeen Provinces. Maastricht was never part of this polity: as a condominium, sovereignty over this city was held jointly by the Prince-Bishopric of Liège and the Duchy of Brabant. Also, the central and northern part of present-day Limburg belonged to different political entities, notably the Duchy of Jülich and the Duchy of Guelders.

By the late Middle Ages most of the present day territory of Limburg had been partitioned to the Duchy of Brabant, the Duchy of Gelderland, the Duchy of Jülich, the Prince-Bishopric of Liège or the Electorate of Cologne. These dukes, prince-bishops and prince-electors were nominal subordinates of the Emperor of the Holy Roman Empire, but in practice acted as independent sovereigns who were often at war with each other. These conflicts were often fought in and over Limburg, contributing to its fragmentation and a loss of economic importance.

Limburg was the scene of many bloody battles during the Eighty Years' War (1568–1648), in which the Dutch Republic threw off Habsburg Spanish rule. At the Battle of Mookerheyde (14 April 1574), two brothers of Prince William of Orange-Nassau and thousands of "Dutch" mercenaries died. Most Limburgians fought on the Spanish side, being Catholics and being opposed to the Calvinist Hollanders.

=== Early modern era ===
In the early modern era, Limburg was largely divided between the Spanish Netherlands (the Austrian Netherlands after 1714), Prussia, the Republic of the Seven United Netherlands, the Prince-Bishopric of Liège and many small independent fiefs. In 1673, King Louis XIV personally commanded the siege of Maastricht by French troops. During the siege, one of his brigadiers, Charles de Batz-Castelmore d'Artagnan, perished.

=== 19th century ===
The modern boundaries of Dutch Limburg, along with its neighbour, Belgian Limburg, were basically set during the period after the French Revolution, which erased much of the "ancien regime" of Europe, with all its old boundaries and titles. These two provinces were part of a new French département, named (like many départements) after the river running through it, "Meuse-Inférieure", meaning simply "lower Maas".

Following the Napoleonic Era, the great powers (the United Kingdom, Prussia, the Austrian Empire, the Russian Empire and France) left the region to the new United Kingdom of the Netherlands in the Congress of Vienna in 1815. A new province was formed which was to receive the name "Maastricht" after its capital. The first king, William I, who did not want the medieval name to be lost, insisted that it be changed to "Province of Limburg". As such, the name of the new province was derived from the old Duchy of Limburg that had existed until 1795 on the east bank of the Meuse river.

When the Catholic and French-speaking Belgians split away from the mainly Calvinist northern Netherlands in the Belgian Revolution of 1830, the Province of Limburg was at first almost entirely under Belgian rule. However, by the 1839 Treaty of London, the province was divided in two, with the eastern part going to the Netherlands and the western part to Belgium, a division that remains today.

With the Treaty of London, what is now the Belgian Province of Luxembourg was handed over to Belgium and removed from the German Confederation. To appease Prussia, which had also lost access to the Meuse after the Congress of Vienna, the Dutch province of Limburg (excluding the cities of Maastricht and Venlo because without them Limburg's population equalled that of the Province of Luxembourg, 150,000), was joined to the German Confederation between 5 September 1839 and 23 August 1866 as the Duchy of Limburg. On 11 May 1867, the Duchy, which from 1839 on had been de jure a separate polity in personal union with the Kingdom of the Netherlands, was reincorporated into the latter with the 1867 Treaty of London, though the term "Duchy of Limburg" remained in some official use until February 1907. Another idiosyncrasy survives today: the head of the province, referred to as the "King's Commissioner" in other provinces, is addressed as "Governor" in Limburg.

=== 20th century ===
The Second World War cost the lives of many civilians in Limburg, and a large number of towns and villages were destroyed by bombings and artillery battles. Almost 8,500 American soldiers, who perished during the liberation of the Netherlands, lie buried at the Netherlands American Cemetery and Memorial in Margraten. Other big war cemeteries are to be found at Overloon (British soldiers) and the Ysselsteyn German war cemetery was constructed in the Municipality of Venray for the 31,000 German soldiers who died.

According to the research of Herman van Rens, the residents of Limburg were especially active in hiding local and refugee Jews during the Holocaust, to the extent that the Jewish population even increased during the war. Jews in hiding were three times as likely to survive in Limburg as in Amsterdam.

In December 1991, the European Community (now European Union) held a summit in Maastricht. At that summit, the "Treaty on European Union" or so-called Maastricht Treaty was signed by the European Community member states. With that treaty, the European Union came into existence.

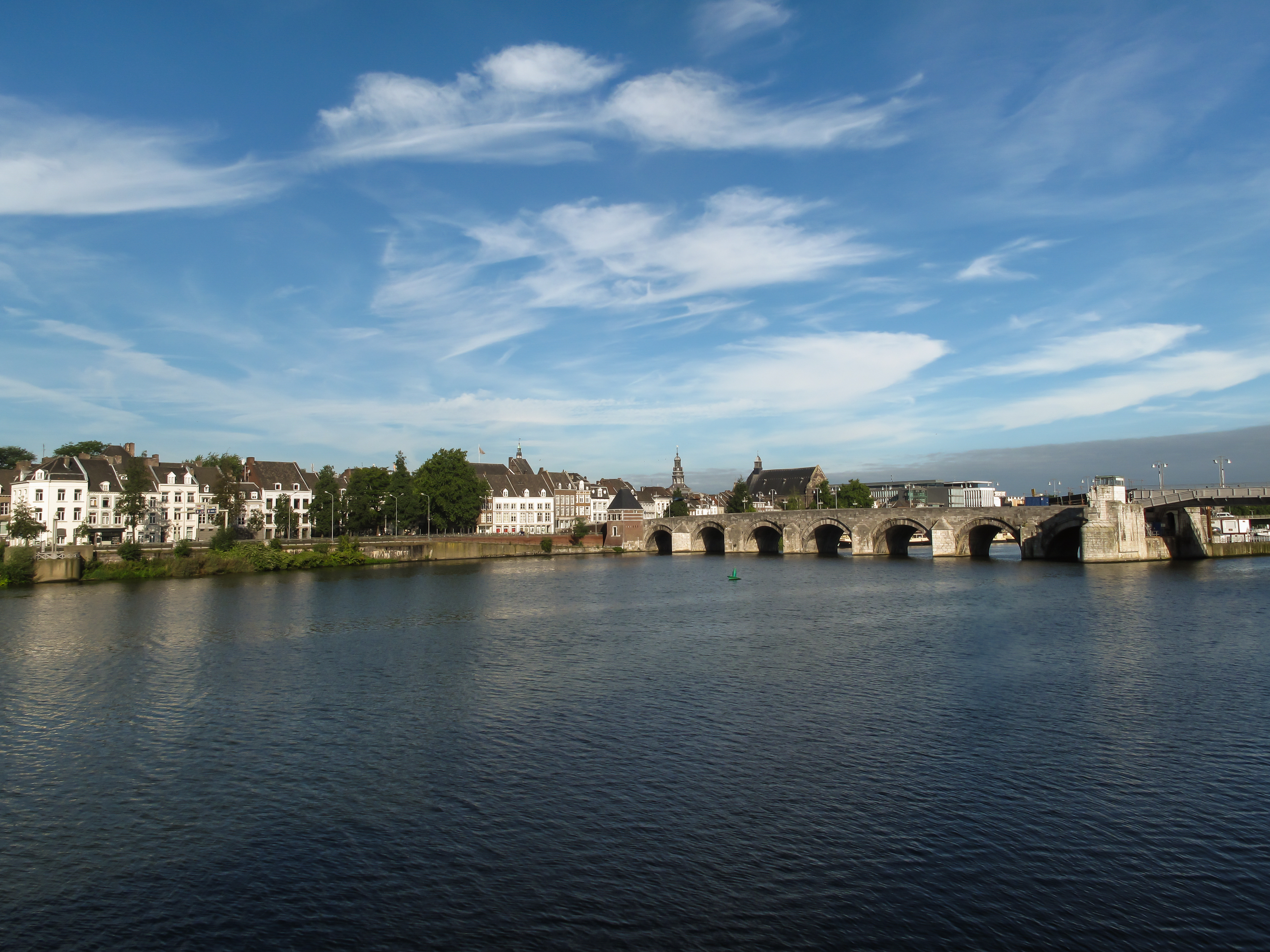
View of the river Meuse and the Medieval Sint Servaasbrug in Maastricht, Limburg's capital

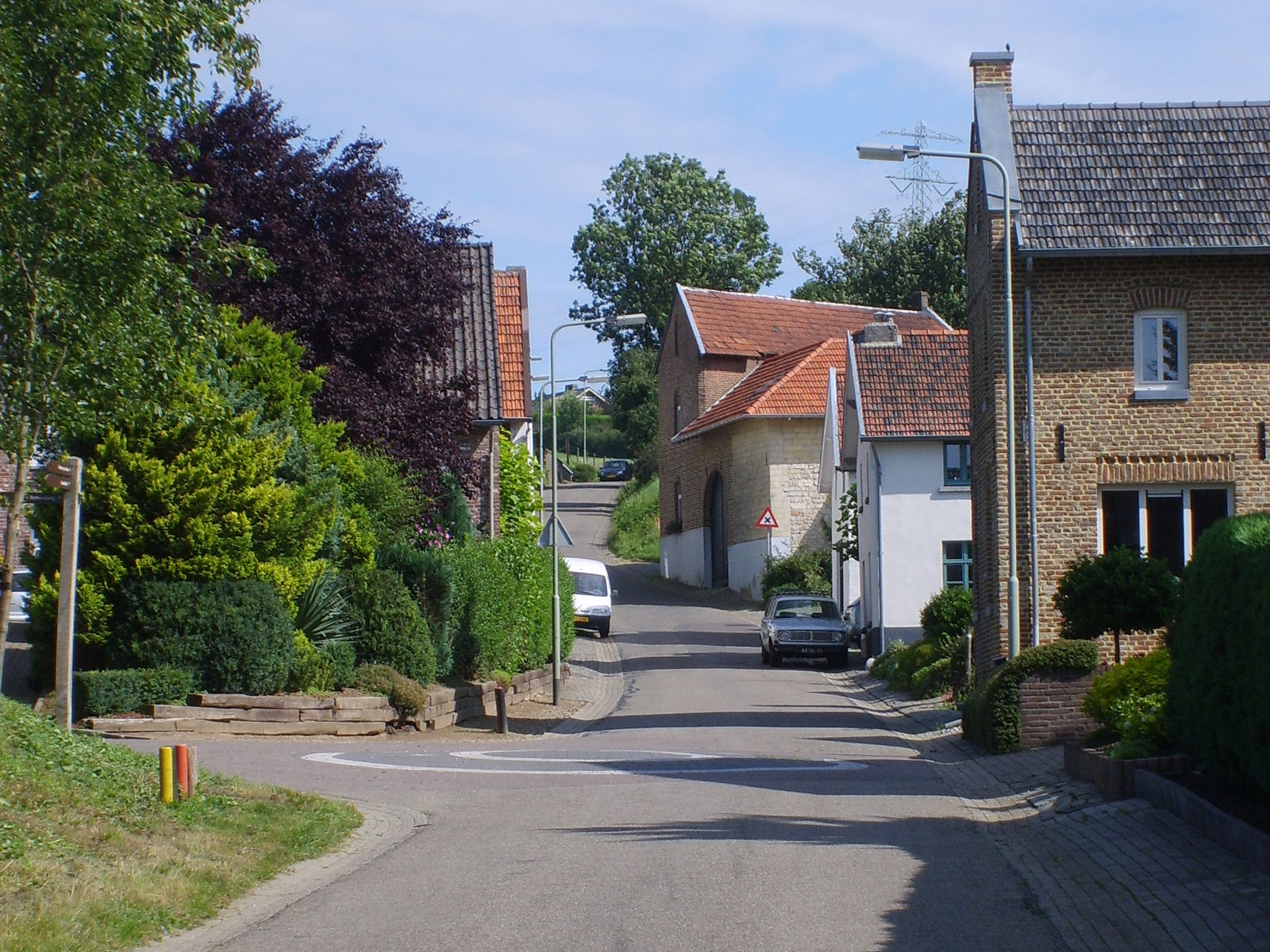
View of a typical street in a hilly South-Limburgian hamlet; here in Walem

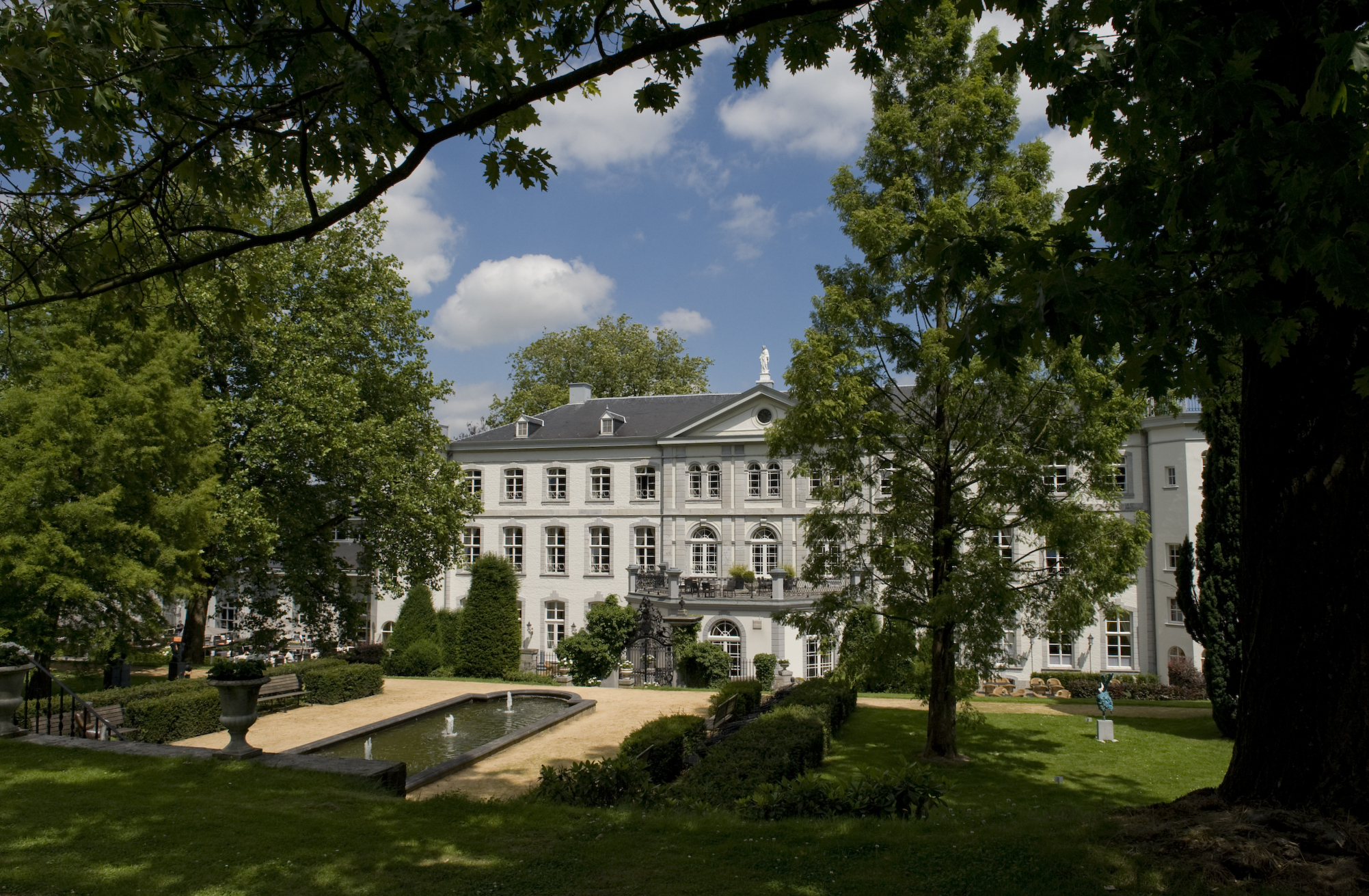
Huis Bloemendaal in Vaals, an 18th-century stately home, also used as a monastery, now a hotel

=== Anthem ===
Limburg mijn Vaderland (Limburg my Fatherland) is the official anthem of both Belgian and Dutch Limburg.

== Language ==
Although standard Dutch is the official language and the one most used, Limburgish is currently considered a regional language as described by the Dutch Government. It has been an official regional language since 1997 and it receives moderate protection under Chapter 2 of the European Charter for Regional or Minority Languages. The German and Belgian governments do not recognise it as an official language. Before the 20th century, most newspapers were in French or in German, and schools in Maastricht taught French, as the city has historic ties with the Belgian city of Liège. Other parts of the province taught German.

Limburgish is spoken by an estimated 1.6 million people in Dutch Limburg, Belgian Limburg, and Germany. There are many different dialects of Limburgish; almost every town and village has its own. A lot of isoglosses cross through Limburg. No single dialect can fully represent Limburgish as a whole. Dialects in the north, nearby Venray and Gennep, are classified as Kleverlandish and are closely connected to the dialects in the northeast of Brabant (Land van Cuijk) and the region of Nijmegen. Dialects in the southeast (near Aachen) are closer to Ripuarian and are sometimes classified as Southeast Limburgish. Dialects in the western part of Limburg, surrounding Weert, are influenced by the neighbouring dialects of southeast Brabant, which means that the tone is more Brabantic than in the rest of Limburg.

== Politics ==
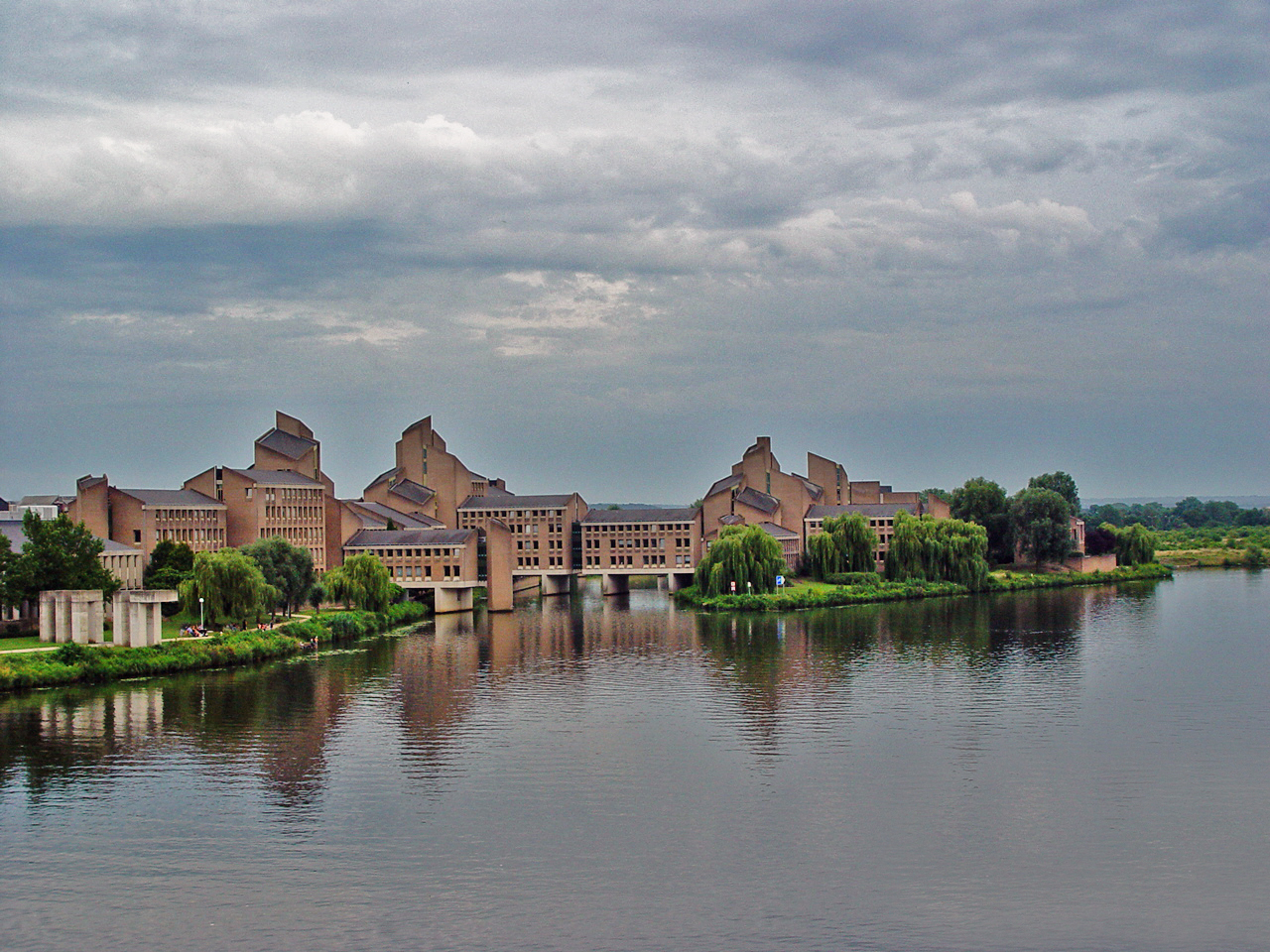
Provincial Government Buildings in Maastricht

The provincial council (States-Provincial - Provinciale Staten) has 47 seats, and is headed by a King's Commissioner (Commissaris van de Koning) who unofficially is called the Governor. While the provincial council is elected by the inhabitants, the King's Commissioner is appointed by the King and the cabinet of the Netherlands. Since December 2021 Emile Roemer (SP) has been holding the office of governor.

Since the 2011 elections the Christian Democratic Appeal (CDA) was the largest party in the council, although the Party for Freedom (PVV) won the most votes during the election. However, two members of the PVV left the party, taking their seats with them, which lost the PVV their number one status.

Since the 2015 elections the CDA (11 seats) has again been the largest party, followed by the PVV (9 seats) and the Socialist Party (SP) (8 seats).

The province's daily affairs are taken care of by the Provincial-Executive (Gedeputeerde Staten), which are also headed by the King's Commissioner; its members (gedeputeerden) can be compared with ministers.

=== States-Provincial ===
Results of the elections for the States-Provincial:

| Parties | 2007 | 2011 | 2015 | 2019 | 2023 |
|---|---|---|---|---|---|
| CDA | 18 | 10 | 11 | 9 | 5 |
| PVV | - | 10 | 9 | 7 | 6 |
| SP | 9 | 6 | 8 | 4 | 3 |
| VVD | 7 | 8 | 5 | 5 | 5 |
| D66 | 1 | 2 | 4 | 3 | 3 |
| PvdA | 8 | 6 | 4 | 3 | 3 |
| GreenLeft | 2 | 3 | 2 | 4 | 4 |
| 50PLUS | - | 2 | 1 | 1 | 1 |
| Party for the Animals | 1 | 0 | 1 | 2 | 2 |
| People's Party Limburg | - | - | 1 | - | - |
| Local-Limburg | - | - | 1 | 2 | 2 |
| Party New Limburg | 1 | 0 | - | - | - |
| FvD | - | - | - | 7 | 1 |
| BBB | - | - | - | - | 10 |
| JA21 | - | - | - | - | 2 |
| Total | 47 | 47 | 47 | 47 | 47 |

- See also: States of Limburg (more information)

=== Provincial-Executive ===
The Provincial-Executive 2023–2027 consists of the following parties: BBB, CDA, VVD, PvdA and SP.

== Geography ==
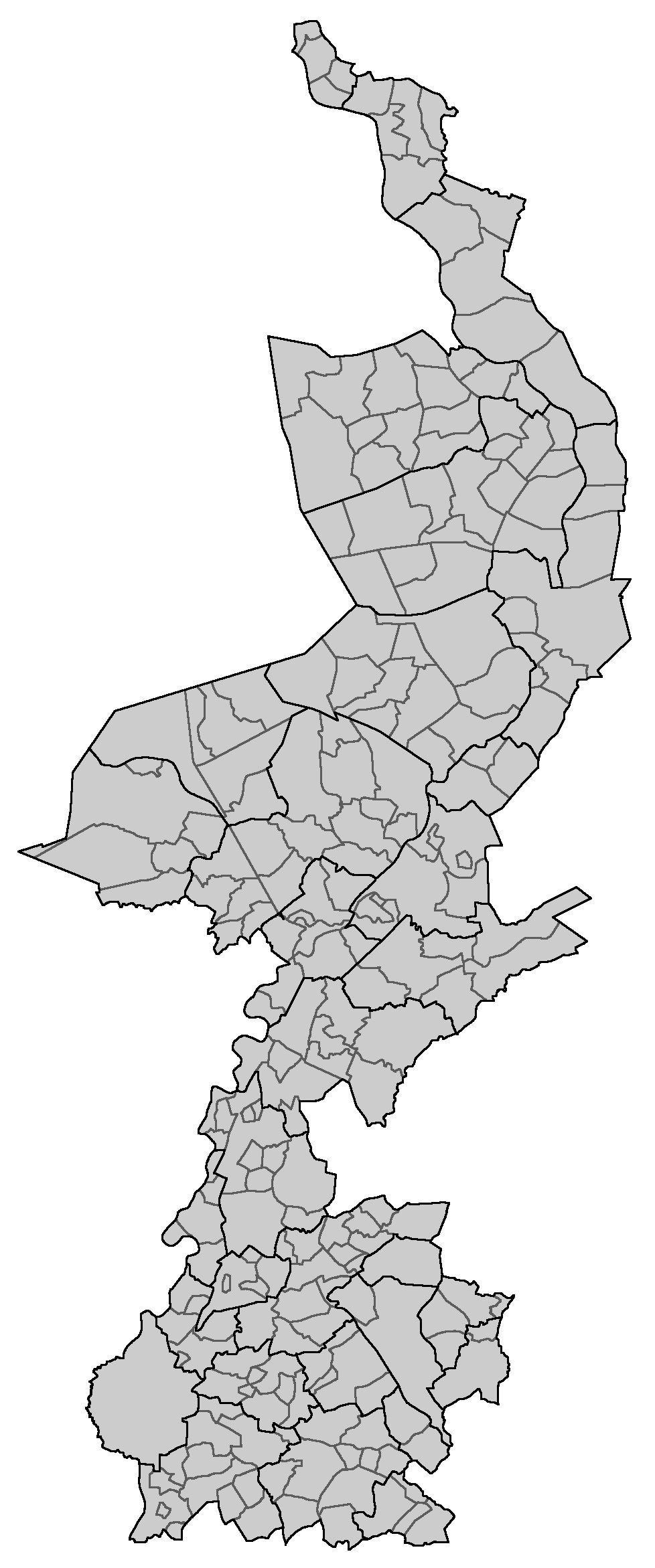
Cities and villages in Limburg including the outlying areas.

Limburg is a salient of the Netherlands into Belgium.

Compared to the rest of the Netherlands the southern part of Limburg is less flat, slightly undulated. The highest point in the continental Netherlands is the Vaalserberg (meaning 'mountain' of Vaals) with a height of 322.4 metres (1,058 ft) above NAP, rising approximately 110 metres above the village Vaals, where three countries (Netherlands, Belgium and Germany) border each other at the so-called "Three-country-point".

Limburg's main river is the Meuse, which passes through the province's entire length from south to north.

Limburg's surface is largely formed by deposits from the Meuse, consisting of river clay, fertile loessial soil and large deposits of pebblestone, currently being quarried for the construction industry. In the north of the province, further away from the riverbed, the soil primarily consists of sand and peat.

Limburg makes up one region of the International Organization for Standardization world region code system, having the code ISO 3166-2:NL-LI.

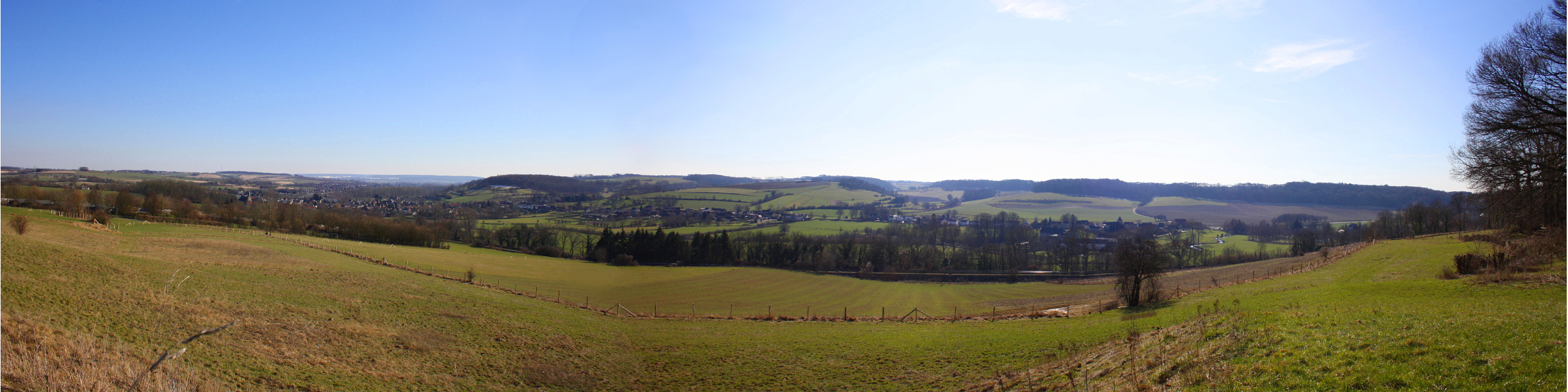
A panorama of the "Heuvelland" (Hill country), here between Schin op Geul and Valkenburg aan de Geul

=== Municipalities ===
The province of Limburg has 31 municipalities.

North Limburg COROP group

- Beesel
- Bergen
- Gennep
- Horst aan de Maas
- Mook en Middelaar
- Peel en Maas
- Venlo
- Venray

Mid Limburg COROP group

- Echt-Susteren
- Leudal
- Maasgouw
- Nederweert
- Roerdalen
- Roermond
- Weert

South Limburg COROP group

- Beek
- Beekdaelen
- Brunssum
- Eijsden-Margraten
- Gulpen-Wittem
- Heerlen
- Kerkrade
- Landgraaf
- Maastricht
- Meerssen
- Simpelveld
- Sittard-Geleen
- Stein
- Vaals
- Valkenburg aan de Geul
- Voerendaal

=== Cities ===
From North to South: Gennep, Venray, Venlo, Weert, Roermond, Thorn, Sittard, Geleen, Heerlen, Valkenburg, Kerkrade, Maastricht, Vaals.

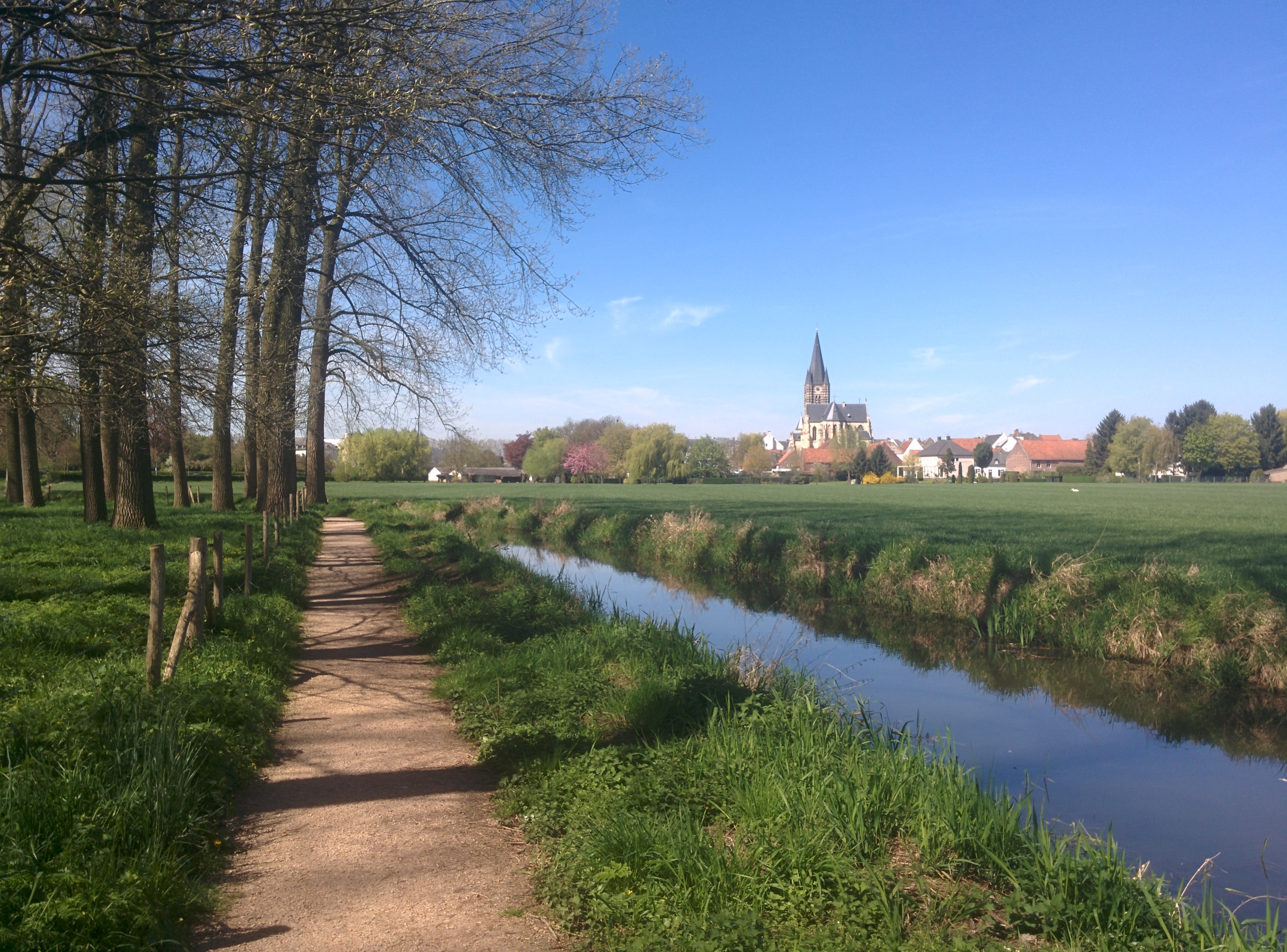
Thorn

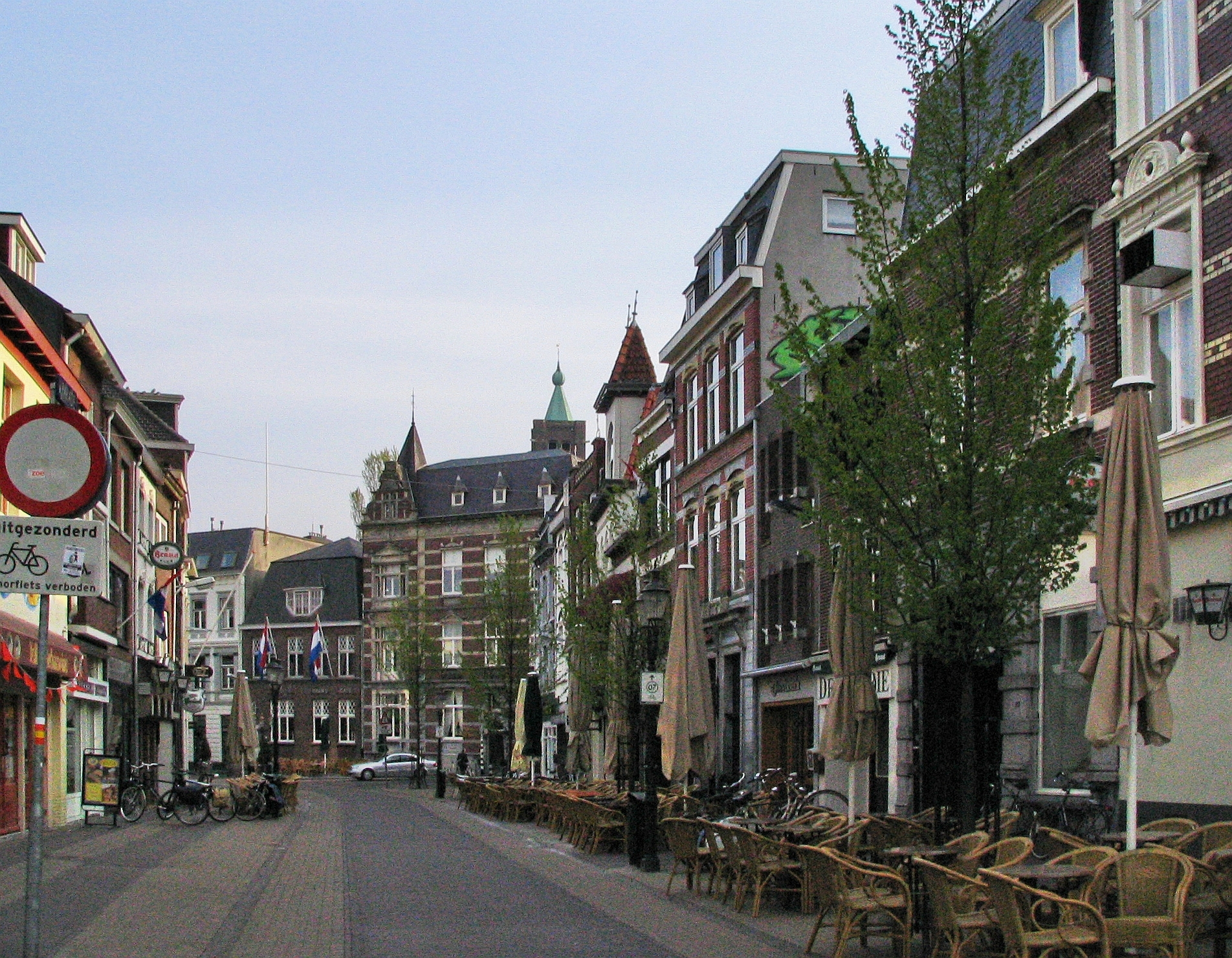
Venlo

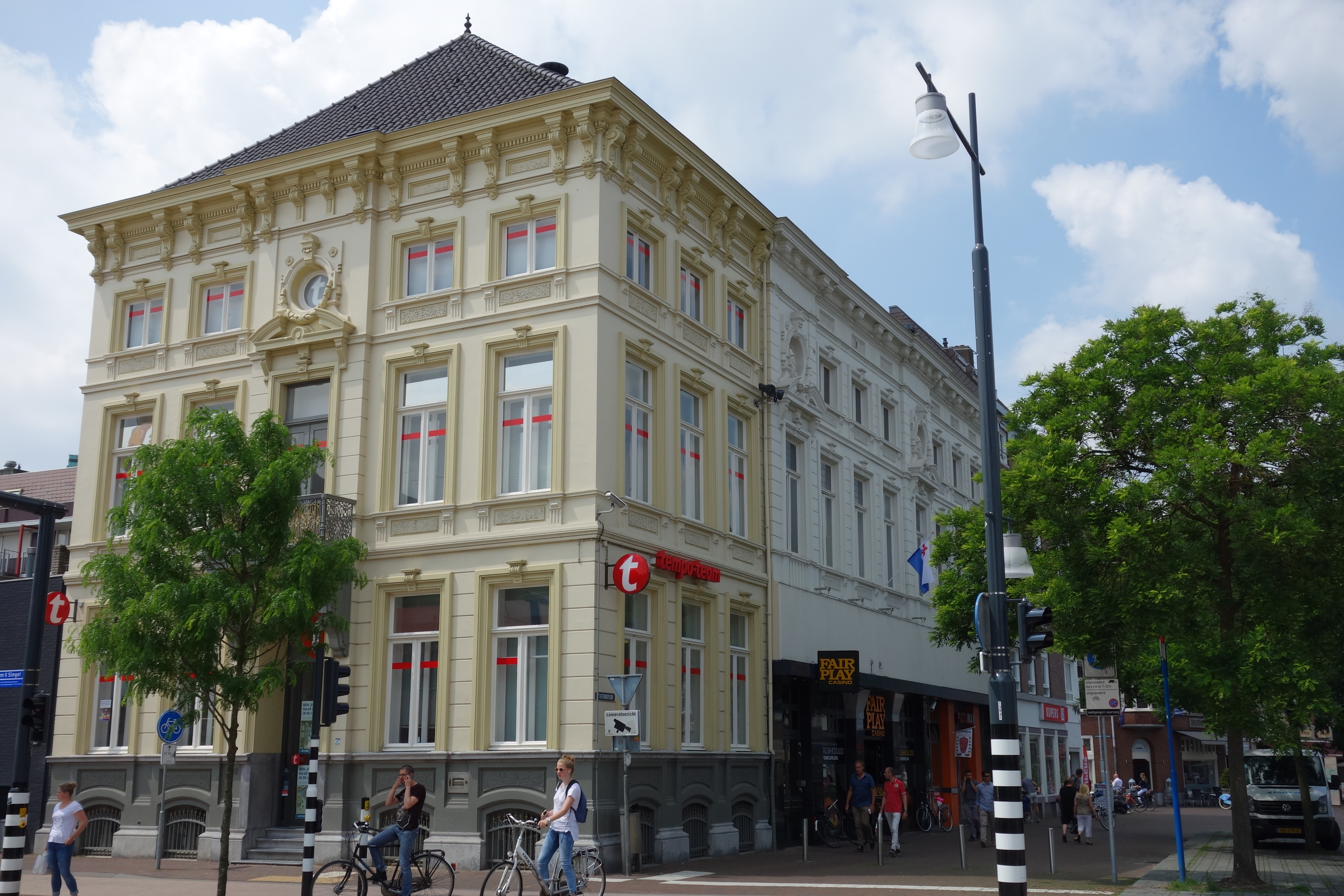
Roermond

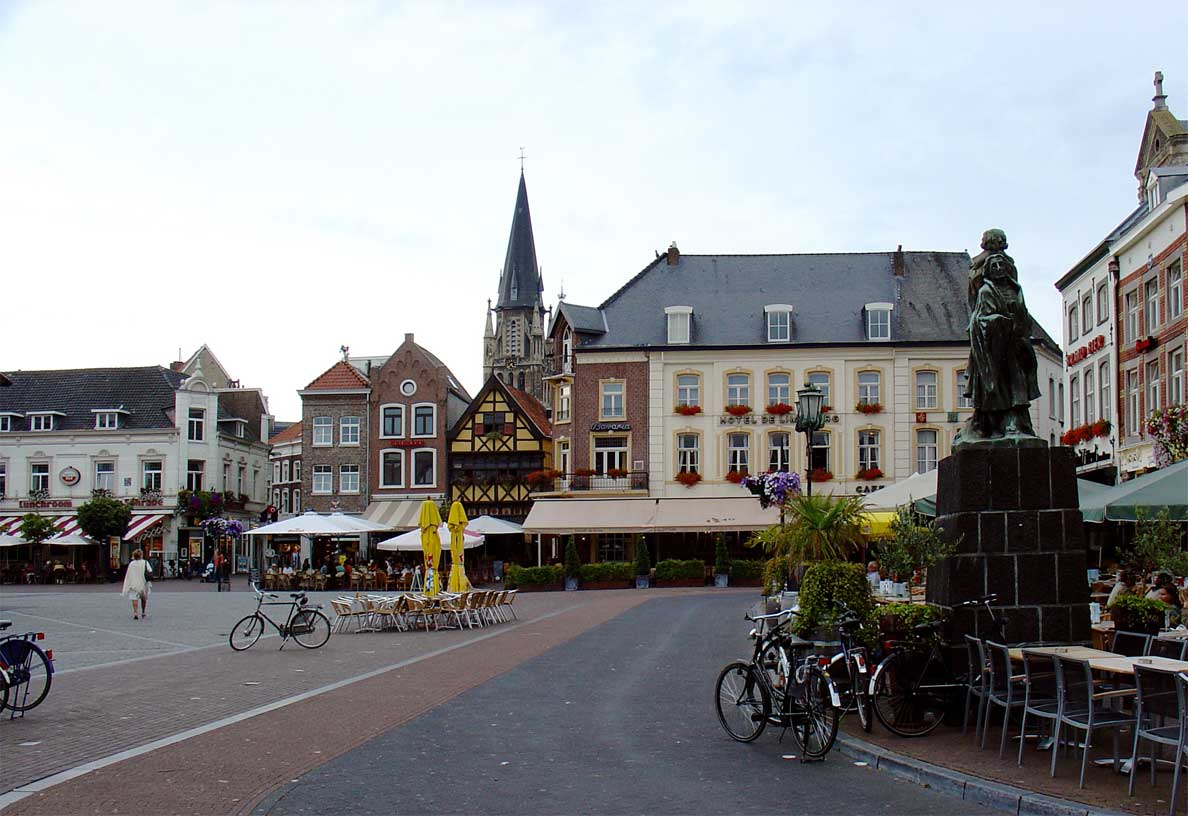
Sittard

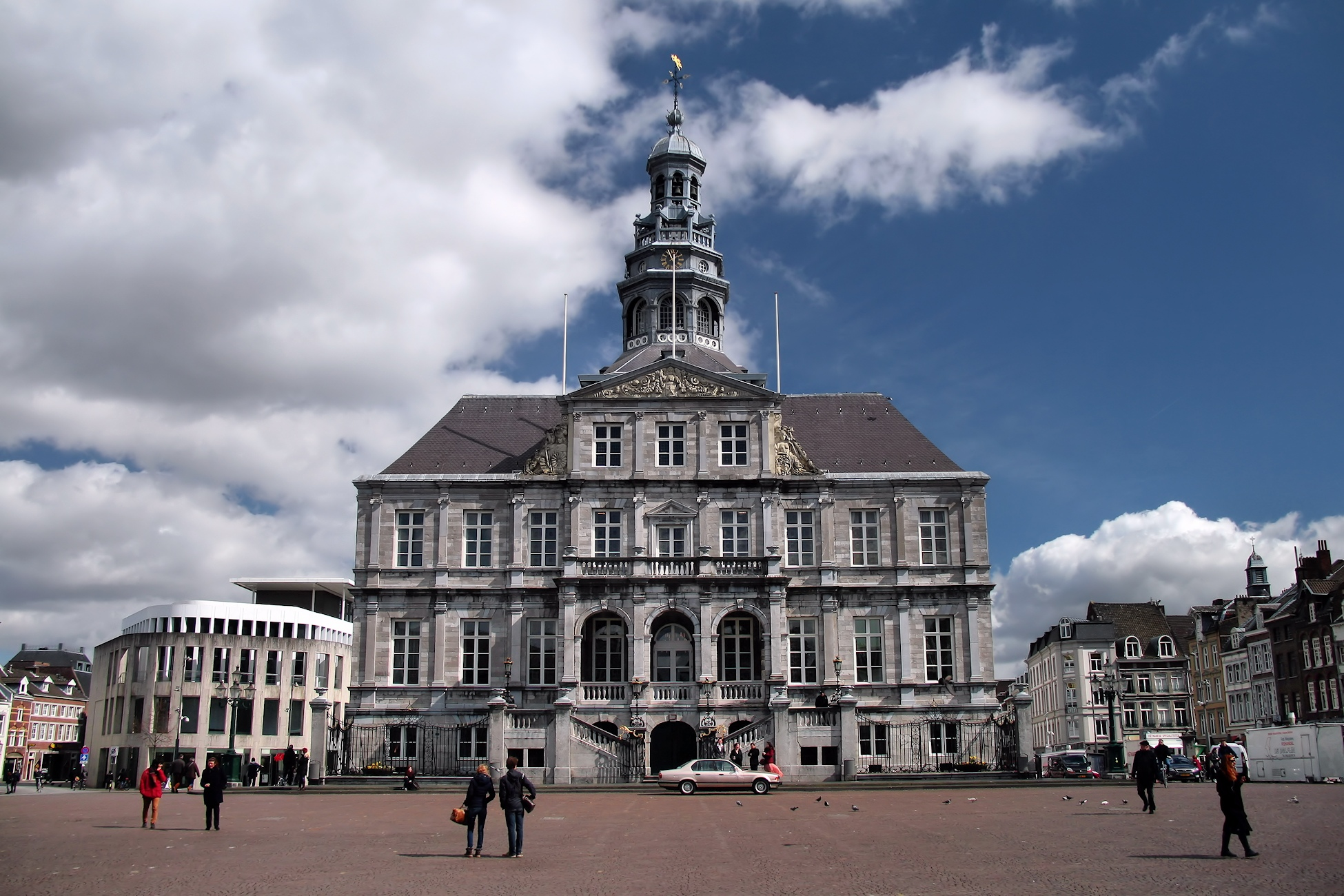
Maastricht

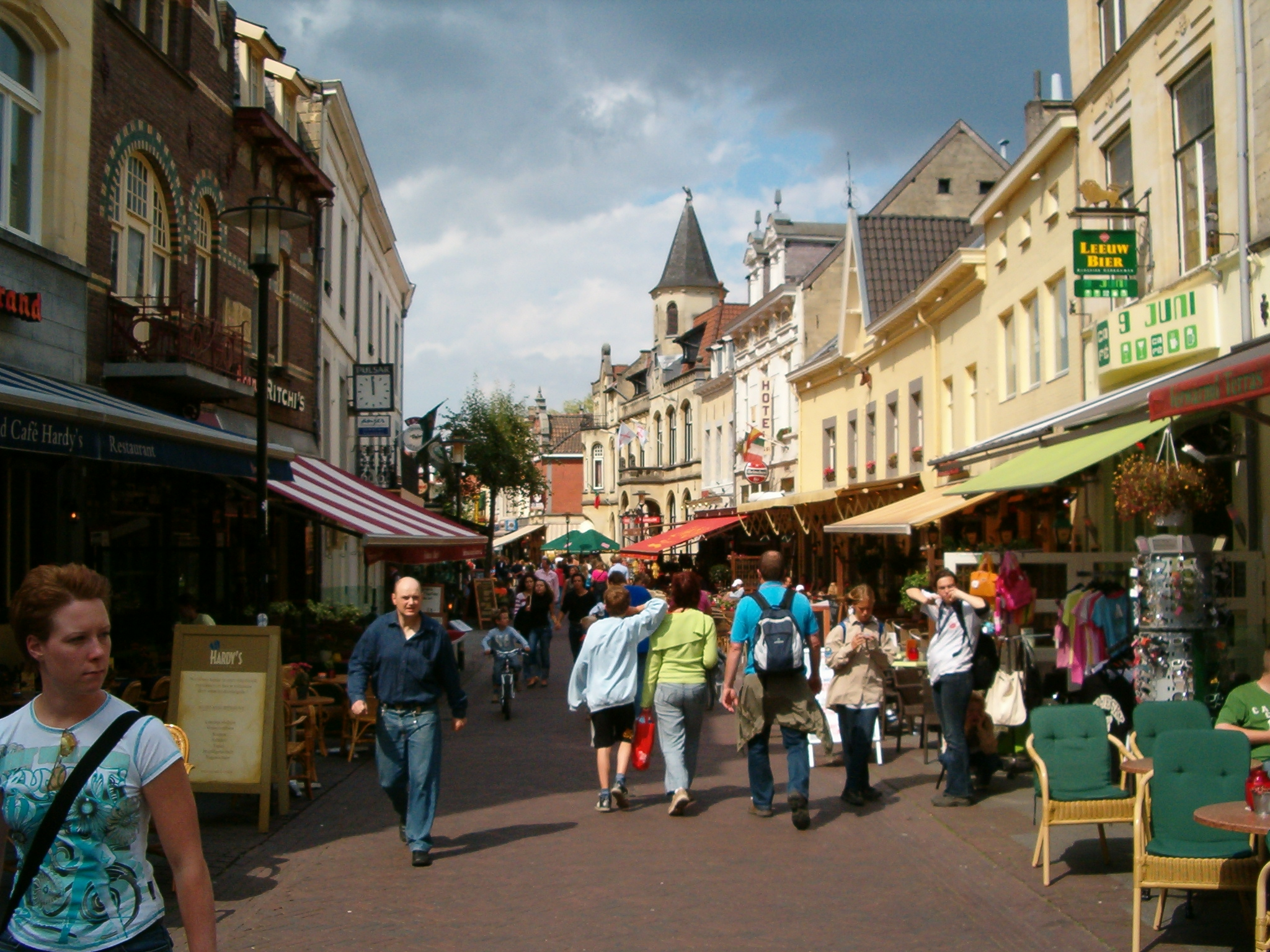
Valkenburg

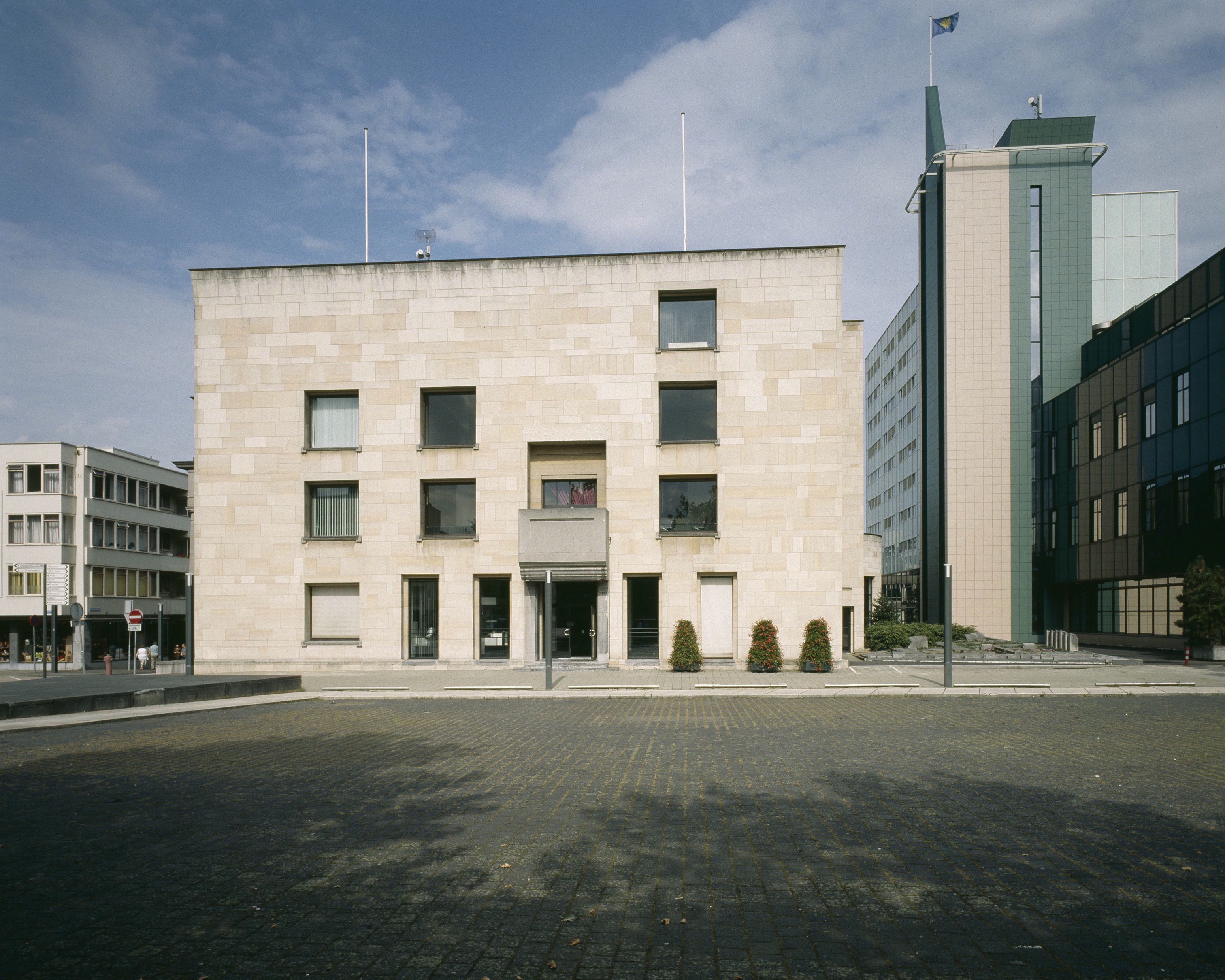
Heerlen

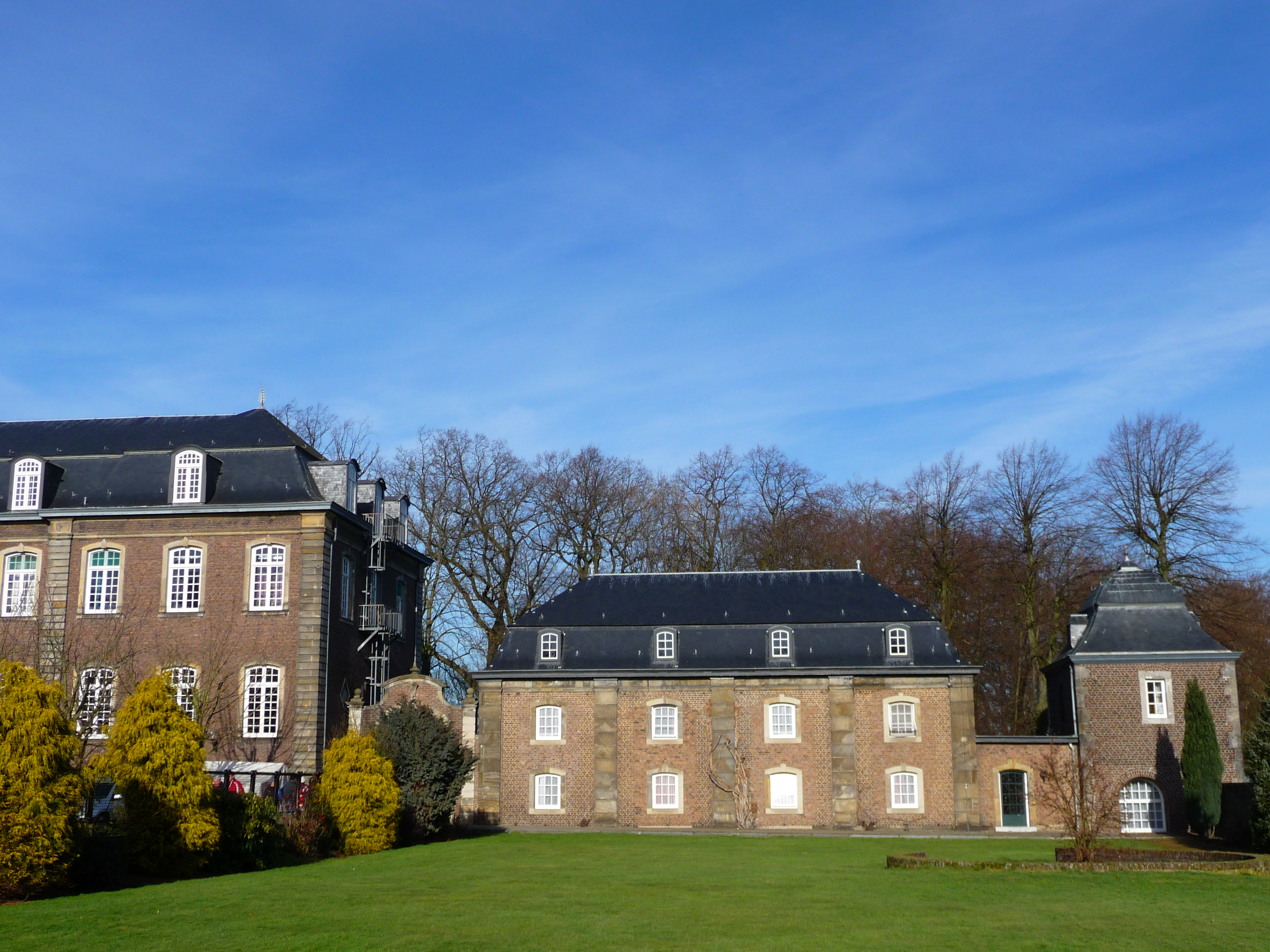
Kerkrade

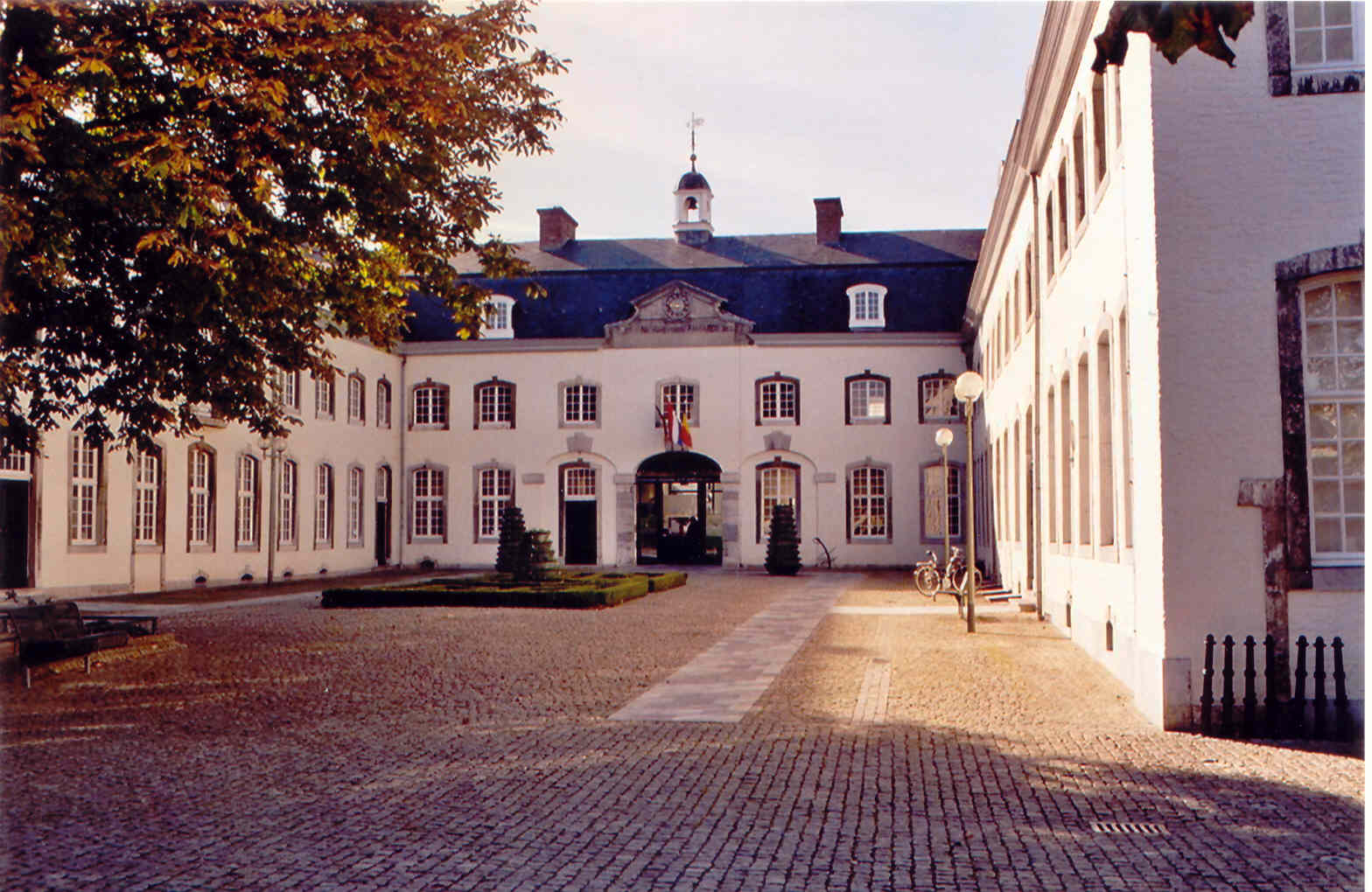
Vaals

== Economy ==
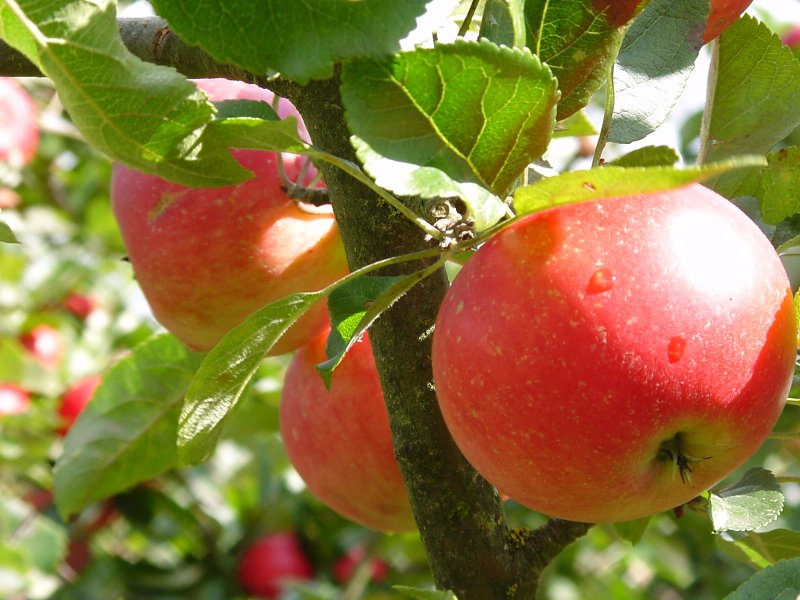
Apples, with cherries, pears and prunes, are the major produce of Limburgian fruit-growing businesses

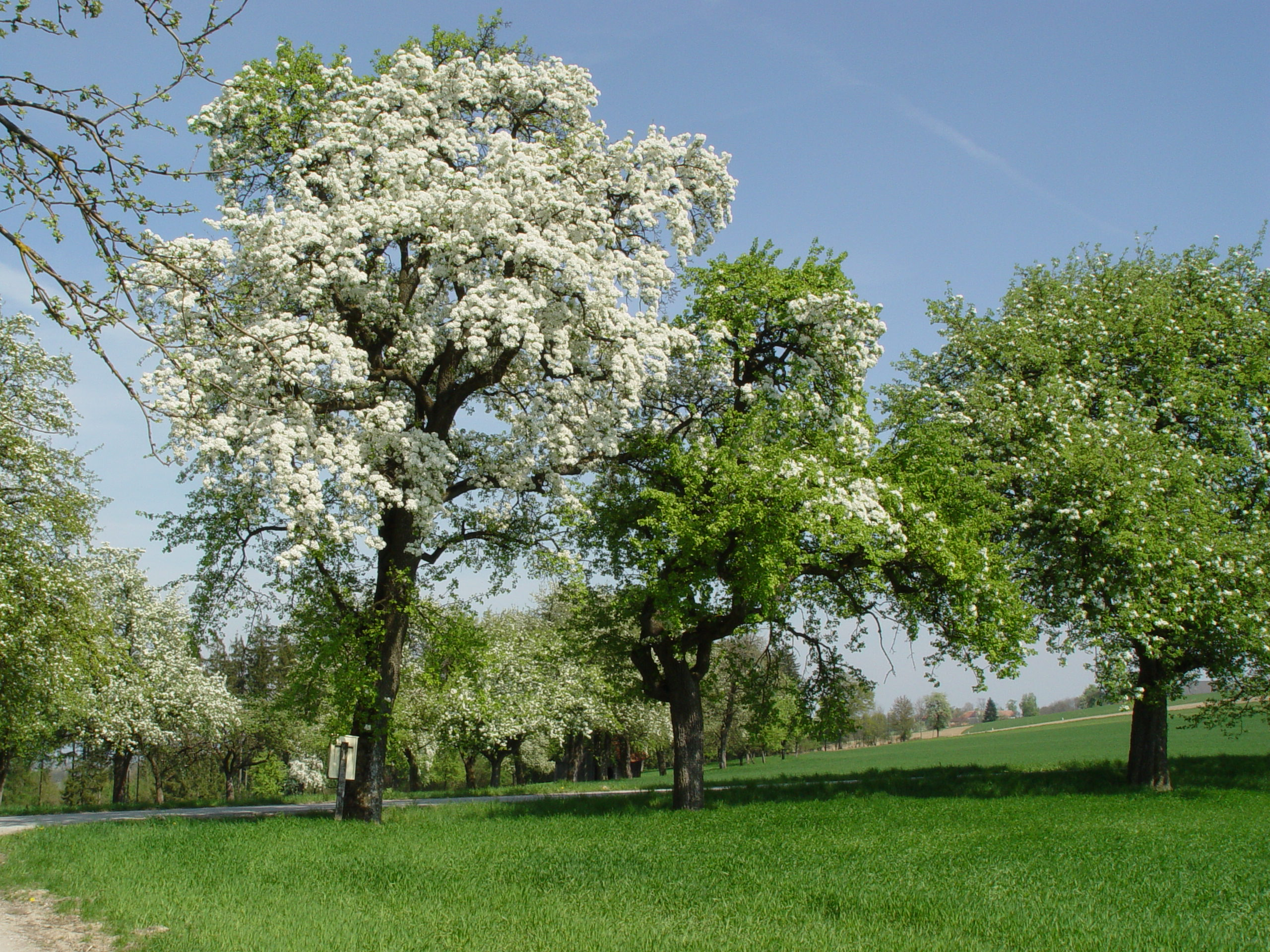
Blooming fruit trees, a tourist attraction in southern Limburg

The Gross domestic product (GDP) of the province was €44.5 billion in 2018, accounting for 5.7% of the Netherlands economic output. GDP per capita adjusted for purchasing power was €34,700 or 115% of the EU27 average in the same year.

In the past peat and coal were mined in Limburg. In 1965–75 the coal mines were finally closed. As a result, 60,000 people lost their jobs in the two coal mining areas, Heerlen-Kerkrade-Brunssum and Sittard-Geleen. A difficult period of economic readjustment started. The Dutch government partly eased the pain by moving several government offices (including Stichting Pensioenfonds ABP and CBS Statistics Netherlands) to Heerlen.

The state-owned corporation that once mined in Limburg, DSM, is now a major chemical company, still operating in Limburg. In 2002 DSM sold its petrochemical division (naphtha crackers and polyolefin plants) to SABIC of Saudi Arabia. In 2010, the agro and melamine business groups were sold to OCI Nitrogen. SABIC is located on the Chemelot campus in Sittard-Geleen, which is bounded by the Chemelot Industrial Park, one of Western Europe's biggest industrial sites. At this moment 8000 people work at Chemelot, of which 1000 are active at the Campus. The innovation and licensing division Stamicarbon of DSM was sold in 2009 to Maire Tecnimont, the parent company of an engineering, main contracting and licensing group that operates worldwide in the oil, gas & petrochemicals, power, infrastructure and civil engineering sectors. Stamicarbon is based in Sittard-Geleen.

VDL Nedcar in Born (Sittard-Geleen) is the only large-scale car manufacturer in the Netherlands, currently manufacturing MINIs and BMW X1s. Other industries include rockwool in Roermond, Océ copiers and printers manufacturers in Venlo and a paper factory in Maastricht. There are four large beer breweries in Limburg.

Southern Limburg has long been one of the country's two main fruit-growing areas, but over the last four decades, many fruit-growing areas have been replaced by water as a result of gravel quarrying near the Meuse.

Limburg is one of the most important provinces when it comes to Dutch wine production. South Limburg has the highest concentration of vineyards in the Netherlands. Limburg's wine regions have 3 Appellations: Maasvallei, Mergelland and Vijlen. Voerendaalse bergen is expected to be recognized somewhere in 2021.

Tourism is an essential sector of the economy, especially in the hilly southern part of the province. The town of Valkenburg is the main centre.

In 2005, the two provincial newspapers, De Limburger and Limburgs Dagblad, merged.

== Culture ==
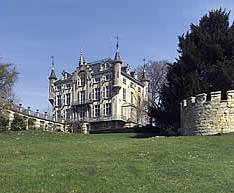
Gronsveld castle

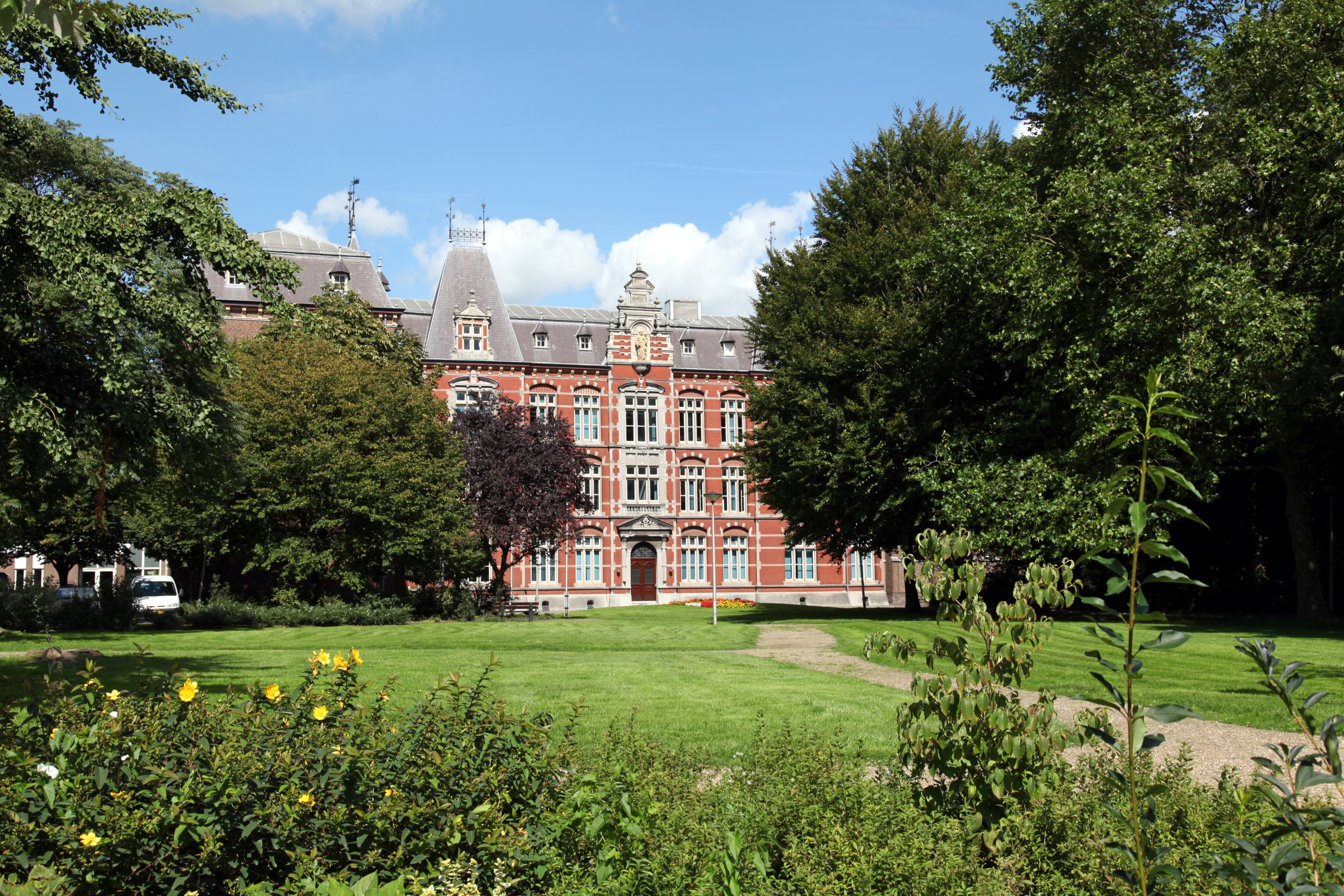
Eijsden town hall

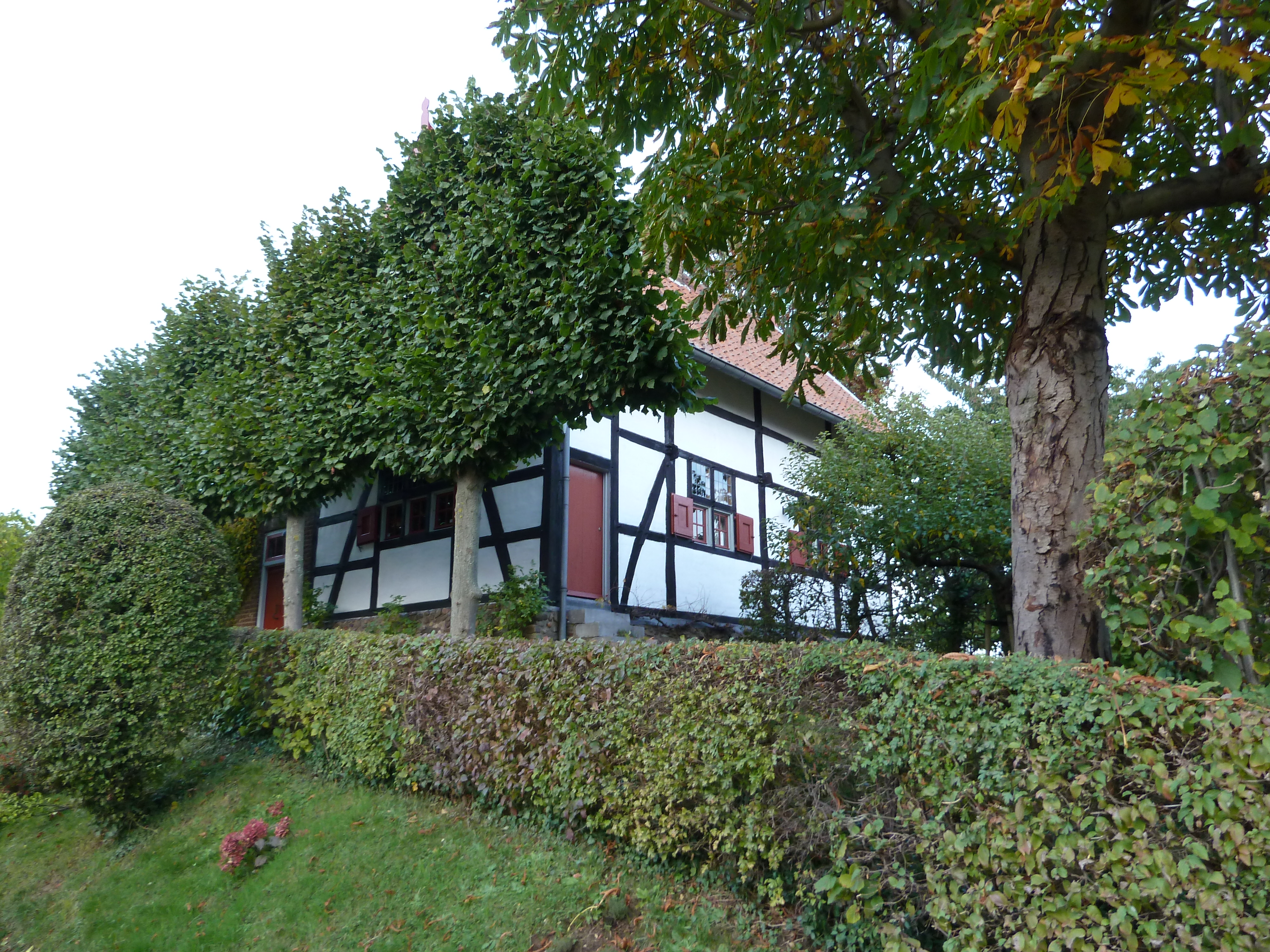
Typical half-timbered houses

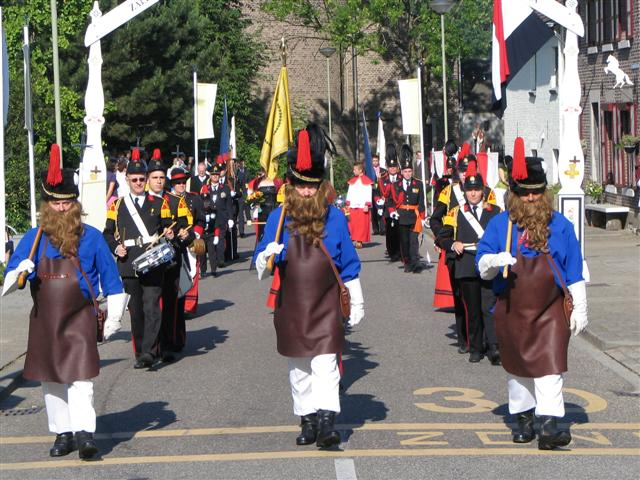
Folklore

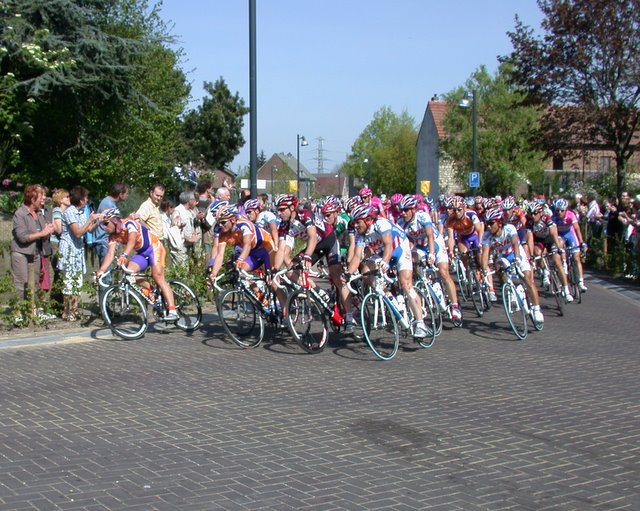
Bicycle-racing

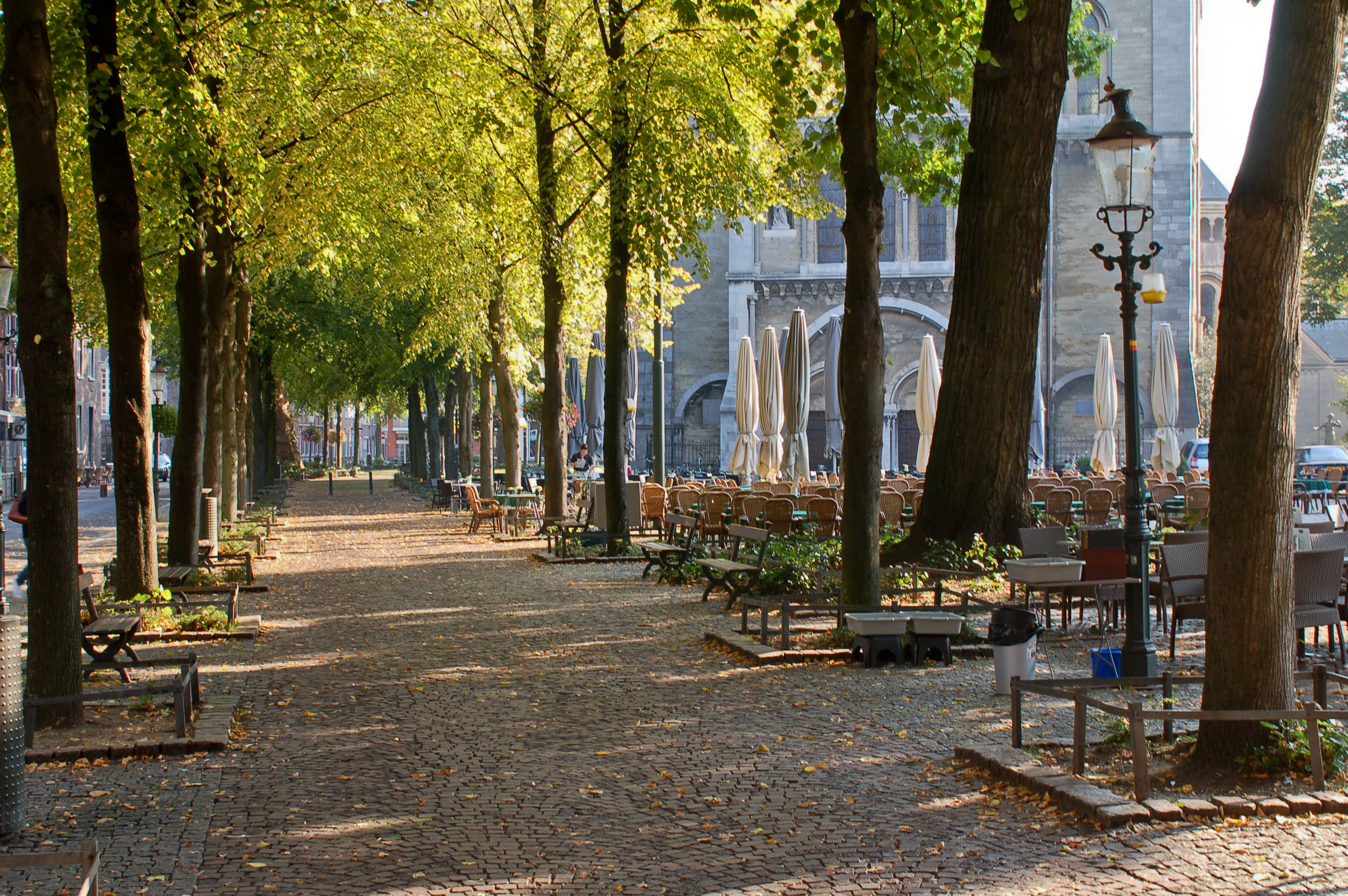
Square in front of the Munsterchurch at Roermond, where the provincial diocese of the Roman Catholic church seats

Essential elements in Limburgian culture are

- Music;
- Religion (predominantly Roman Catholic);
- Folklore (in especially the southern part of the province);
- Carnival;
- Sports, of which especially bicycle racing and soccer are most popular;
- Art (architecture, among others).

=== Music ===
Choral singing is popular in Limburg. One of its best-known choruses is the Mastreechter Staar (Maastricht Star), which performs nationally and internationally.

Wind music ("bloasmuzeek", blown music) is also widespread, most villages and cities have one or more amateur fanfare or wind orchestras ("harmonie").

Every four years the World Music Contest, a competition for professional, amateur and military band sometimes called the Olympic Games of brass band music is held in Kerkrade. In 2013 and 2009 the winner in the World Concert Division was the Koninklijke Harmonie Sainte Cécile, from Eijsden (Limburg).

Also held in Kerkrade (situated on the German border) is the Schlagerfestival, a nationally broadcast event presenting singers of German-language pop music called Schlagers.

Since 1969 yearly on the Pentecost weekend an international pop music festival called Pinkpop Festival takes place in the southern part of Limburg; initially at Geleen, since 1988 at Schaesberg.

More nationally or internationally known musicians from this province are mentioned hereunder in section "Famous Limburgians".

The Limburg Symphony Orchestra, that resided and rehearsed in Maastricht, and was the oldest symphony orchestra of the Netherlands (founded in 1883) following elimination of government grants merged with Het Brabants Orkest to form a single ensemble with the new name of the philharmonie zuidnederland, as of April 2013.

=== Folklore ===
Many places in both Netherlands' and Belgian Limburg still have their own (by now folkloristic) schutterij. An annual festival is held in which all 160 of them compete for the highest honours to be gained, in the "OLS" (Oud Limburgs Schuttersfeest), which is held somewhere in either Belgian or Netherlands' Limburg.

=== Sports ===
==== Football ====
In Limburg there are currently four professional Football clubs; Roda JC Kerkrade, VVV-Venlo, MVV Maastricht and Fortuna Sittard. Fortuna Sittard competes in the highest Dutch division, the Eredivisie. The others compete in the second highest division.

==== Cycling ====
The annual bike classic Amstel Gold Race is run in the southern part of Limburg. The area has also staged the UCI Road World Championships six times, once hosted by Heerlen and five times by Valkenburg.

==== Handball ====
Team handball is the third-most popular sport in Limburg. The women's team, HV Swift Roermond, has won the national championship in the highest division 19 times. The male teams, Sittardia (Sittard), Vlug en Lenig (Geleen) and BFC (Beek), which in 2008 merged as the Limburg Lions, have in total won the national championship 25 times.

== Religion ==
Limburg is one of two Dutch provinces (North Brabant being the other) that has historically been dominated by the Roman Catholic faith.

In 2015, 64.5% of the population of Limburg identified as Catholic, while 3.3% identified as Muslim, 2.2% with the Protestant Church in the Netherlands, and 2.1% with other churches or faiths. Over a quarter (27.9%) of the population reported being non-religious.

Religion in Limburg (Netherlands) (2015)
1. Catholicism (64.5%)
2. Not religious (27.9%)
3. Islam (3.30%)
4. Protestant Church in the Netherlands (2.20%)
5. Other (2.10%)

In contrast, the Diocese of Roermond, which covers the entire province of Limburg, reports that out of a population of 1,115,895, roughly 1,071,000 or 96% of them were Catholics in 2022.

== Famous Limburgians ==
Politics, science, religion

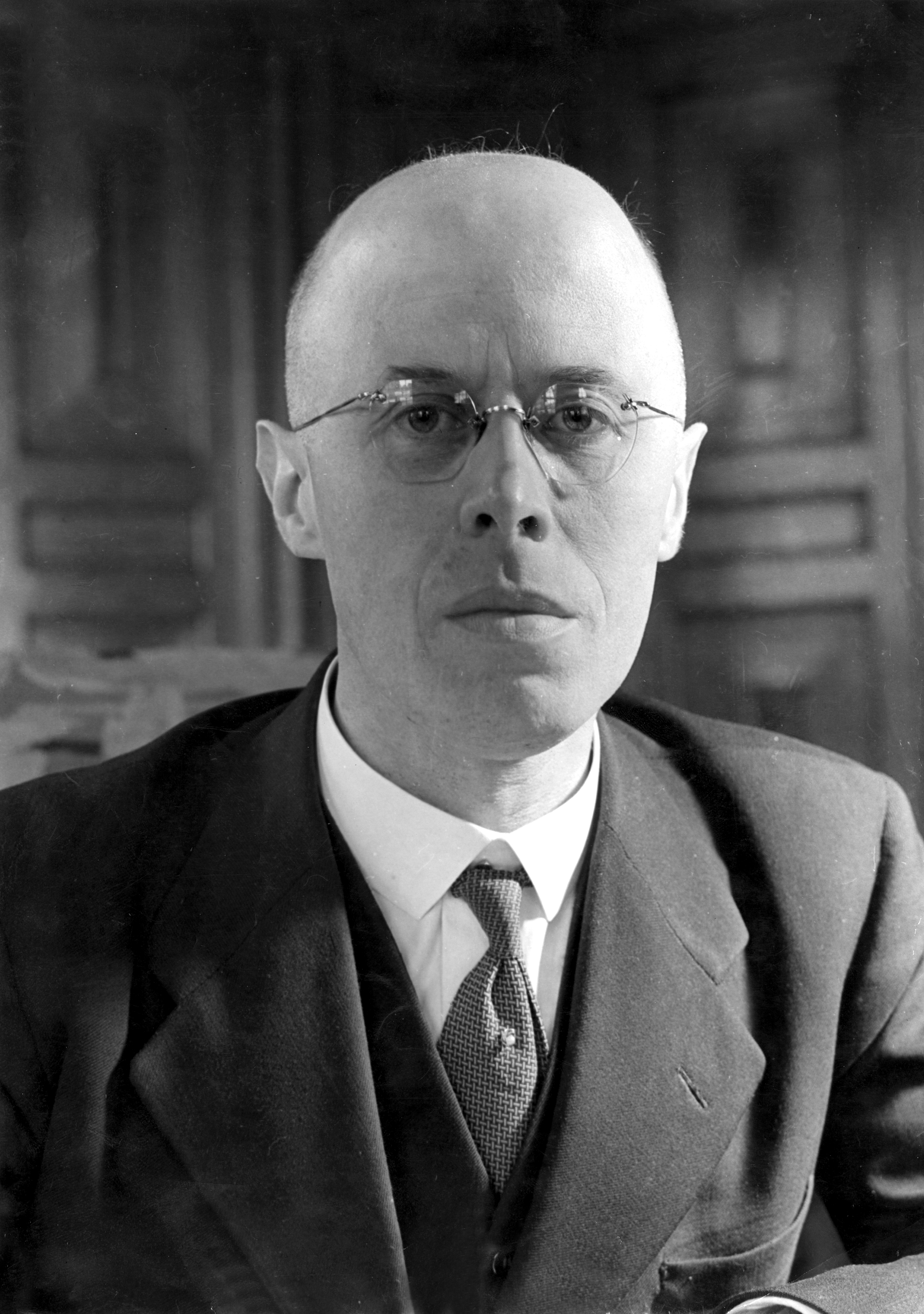
Louis Beel

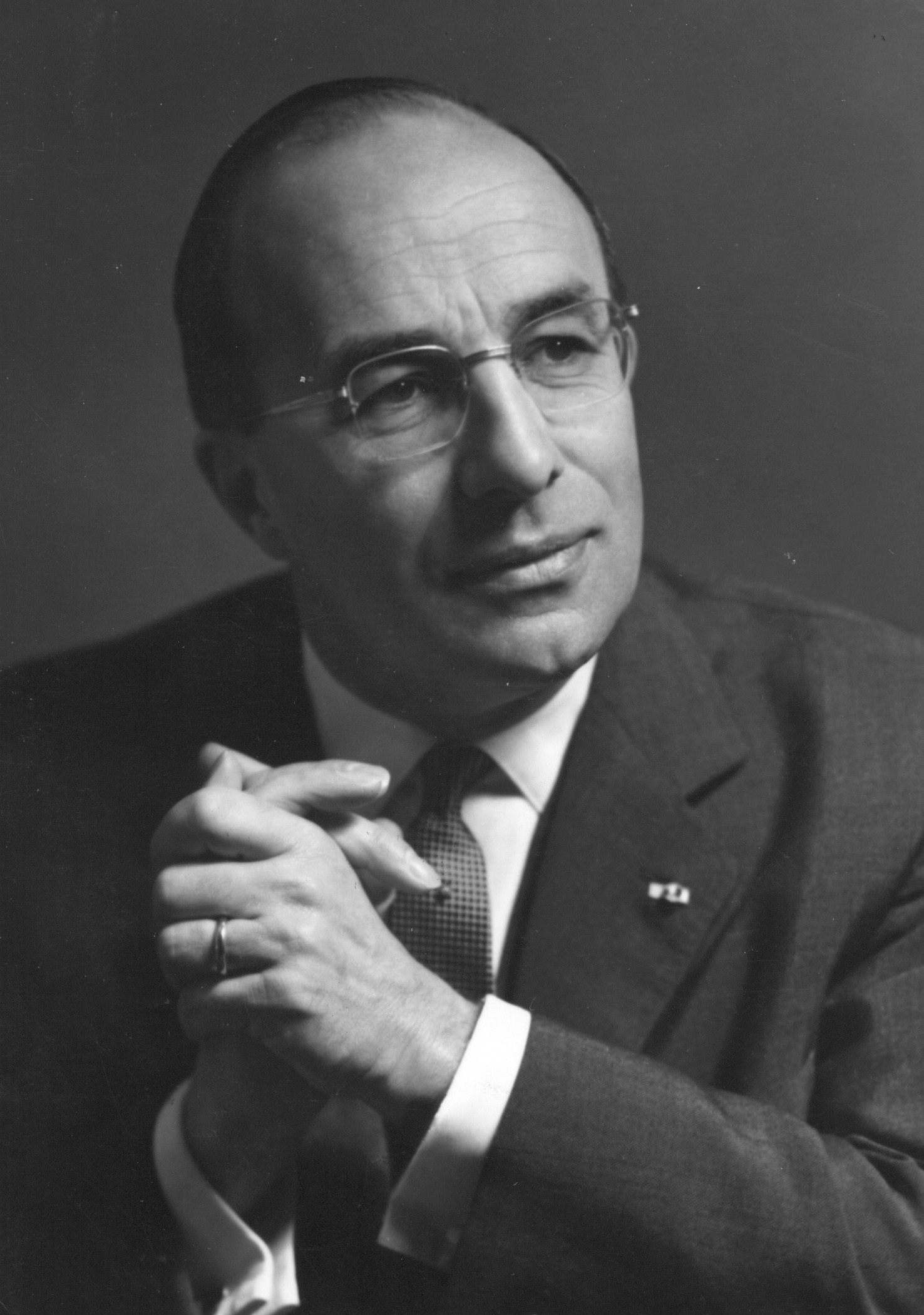
Jo Cals

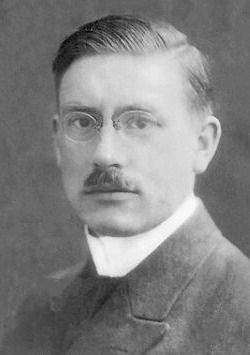
Peter Debye

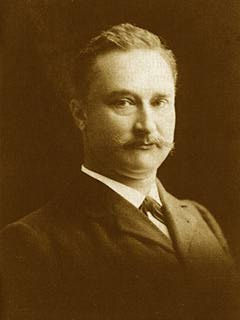
Eugène Dubois

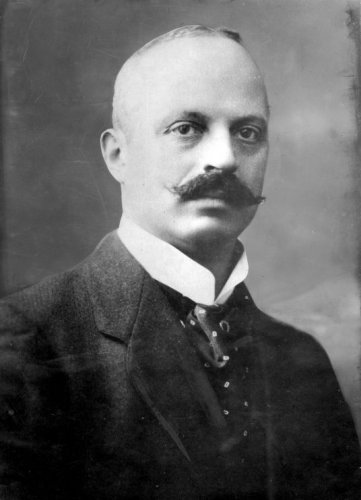
Charles Ruijs de Beerenbrouck

- Louis Beel (1902–1977) - Politician, Prime Minister of the Netherlands
- Jo Cals (1914–1971) - Politician, Prime Minister of the Netherlands
- Jacob Chimarrhaeus (1542–1614) - Grand almoner
- Jan van der Croon (c. 1600–1665) - Military commander
- Peter 'Pie' Debye (1884–1966) - Physicist, Nobel prize winner
- Hub van Doorne (1900–1979) - Founder of DAF
- Eugène Dubois (1858–1940) - Anatomist
- Camiel Eurlings (1973) - Politician
- Saint Gerlach (c. 1100–c. 1170) - Hermit, saint
- Gerard III (1185–1229) - Count of Guelders
- Jeanine Hennis-Plasschaert (1973) - Politician and diplomat
- Godfrey Henschen (1601–1681) - Hagiographer
- Willem van Heythuysen (1590s–1650) - Cloth merchant and hofje founder
- Cesar van Hoensbroeck (1724–1792) - Ecclesiastic, Prince-bishop of Liège
- Maria van der Hoeven (1949) - Politician
- Wilhelm René de l'Homme de Courbière (1733–1811) - General Field Marshal
- Auguste Kerckhoffs (1835–1903) - Linguist and cryptographer
- Jan Gerard Kerkherdere (1677–1738) - Latinist
- Lambert of Maastricht (c. 636–c. 705) - Bishop, saint
- Rene van der Linden (1943) - Politician
- Joep Lange (1954–2014) - Clinical researcher specializing in HIV therapy
- Pierre Lardinois (1924–1987) - Politician
- Gerd Leers (1951) - Politician, Minister of Immigration and Asylum
- Andreas Victor Michiels (1797–1849) - Major general; military and administrative officer in the Dutch East Indies
- Jan Pieter Minckeleers (1748–1824) - Physician, inventor
- Annemarie Mol (1943) - Ethnographer and philosopher
- Philip de Montmorency (c. 1524–1568) - Victim of the Inquisition in the Spanish Netherlands
- Charles of Mount Argus (1821–1893) - Priest, saint
- Johannes Murmellius (c. 1480–1517) - Teacher and humanist
- Henrietta d'Oultremont (1792–1864) - Countess of Nassau, wife of William I, the first king of the Netherlands
- Erycius Puteanus (1574–1646) - Humanist
- Christian Quix (1773–1844) - Priest, historian, director of the city library of Aachen
- Richardis of Bavaria (1173–1231) - Abbess
- Ria Oomen-Ruijten (1950) - Politician and member of the European Parliament
- Charles Ruijs de Beerenbrouck (1873–1936) - Politician, Prime Minister of the Netherlands
- Jolande Sap (1963) - Politician
- Frans Schraven (1873–1937) - Bishop in China
- François Vincent Henri Antoine de Stuers (1792–1881) - Dutch general and commander of the East Indies Army
- H. J. J. L. de Stuers (1788–1861) - Dutch general and commander of the East Indies Army
- Victor de Stuers (1843–1916) - Historian, lawyer, civil servant and politician
- Frans Timmermans (1961) - Politician, current First Vice President of the European Commission and former Minister of Foreign Affairs
- Yvonne Timmerman-Buck (1956) - Politician, President of the Senate of the Netherlands
- Jac. P. Thijsse (1865–1945) - Biologist, ecologist
- Johannes Herman Frederik Umbgrove (1899–1954) - Geologist and earth scientist
- Maxime Verhagen (1956) - Politician, former Minister of Economic Affairs
- Aelius Everhardus Vorstius (1565–1624) - Physician
- Waleran III (c. 1165–1226) - Count of Arlon and Duke of Limburg
- Frans de Wever (1869–1940) - General practitioner
- Geert Wilders (1963) - Politician
- Henri Winkelman (1876–1952) - Commander-in-chief of the Dutch Armed forces

Entertainment, arts

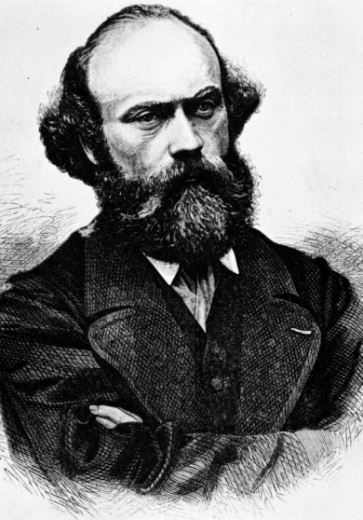
Pierre Cuypers

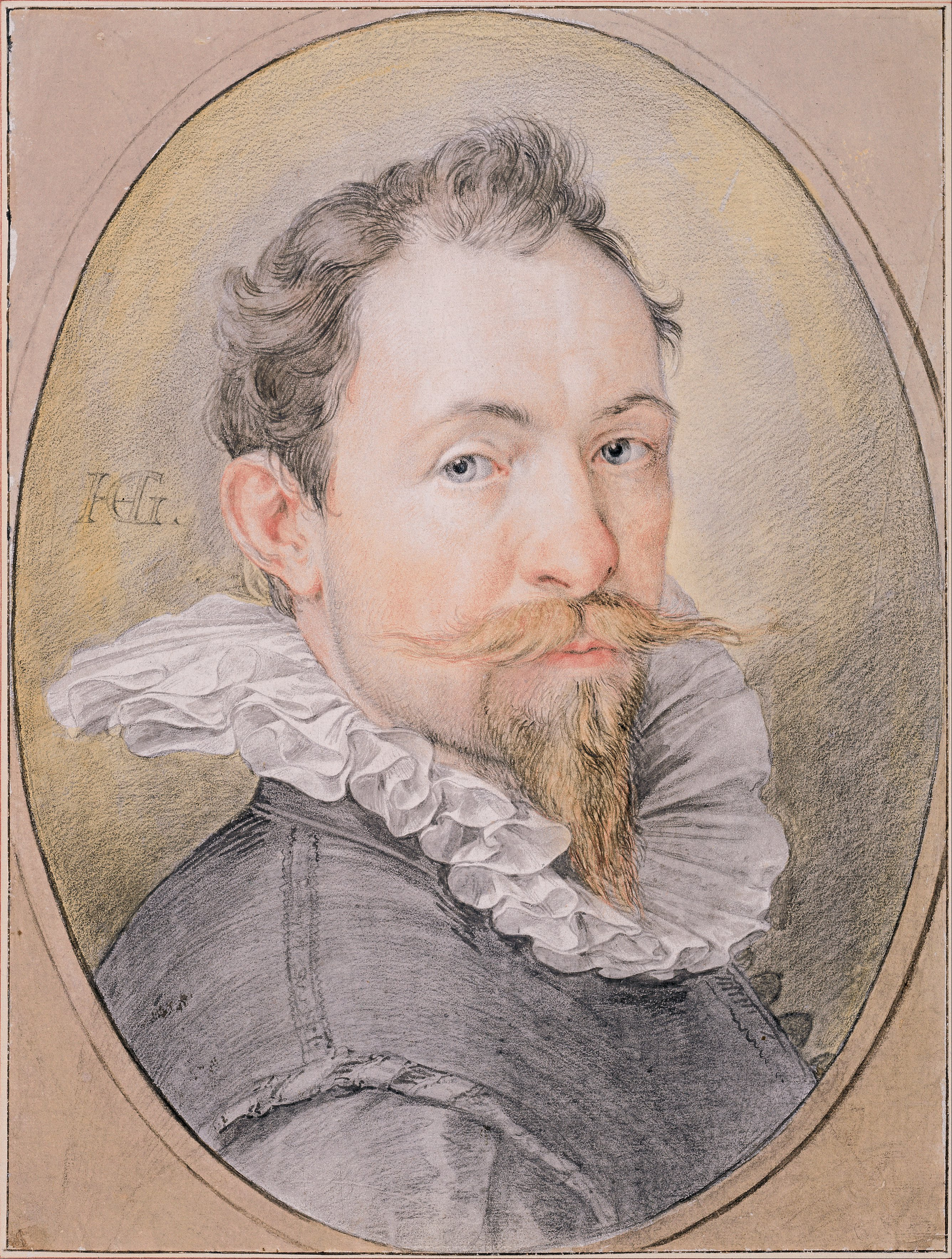
Hendrick Goltzius

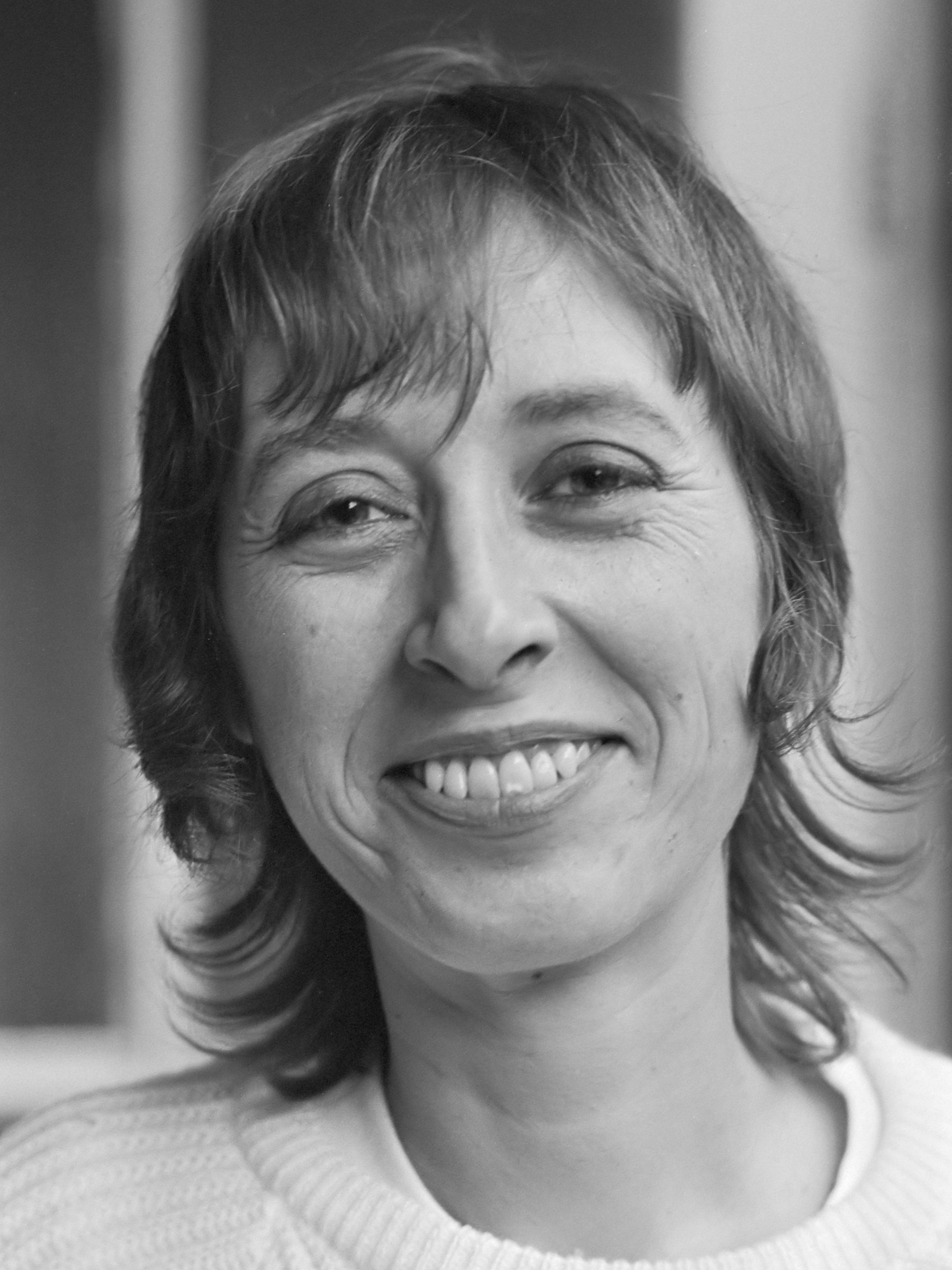
Marleen Gorris

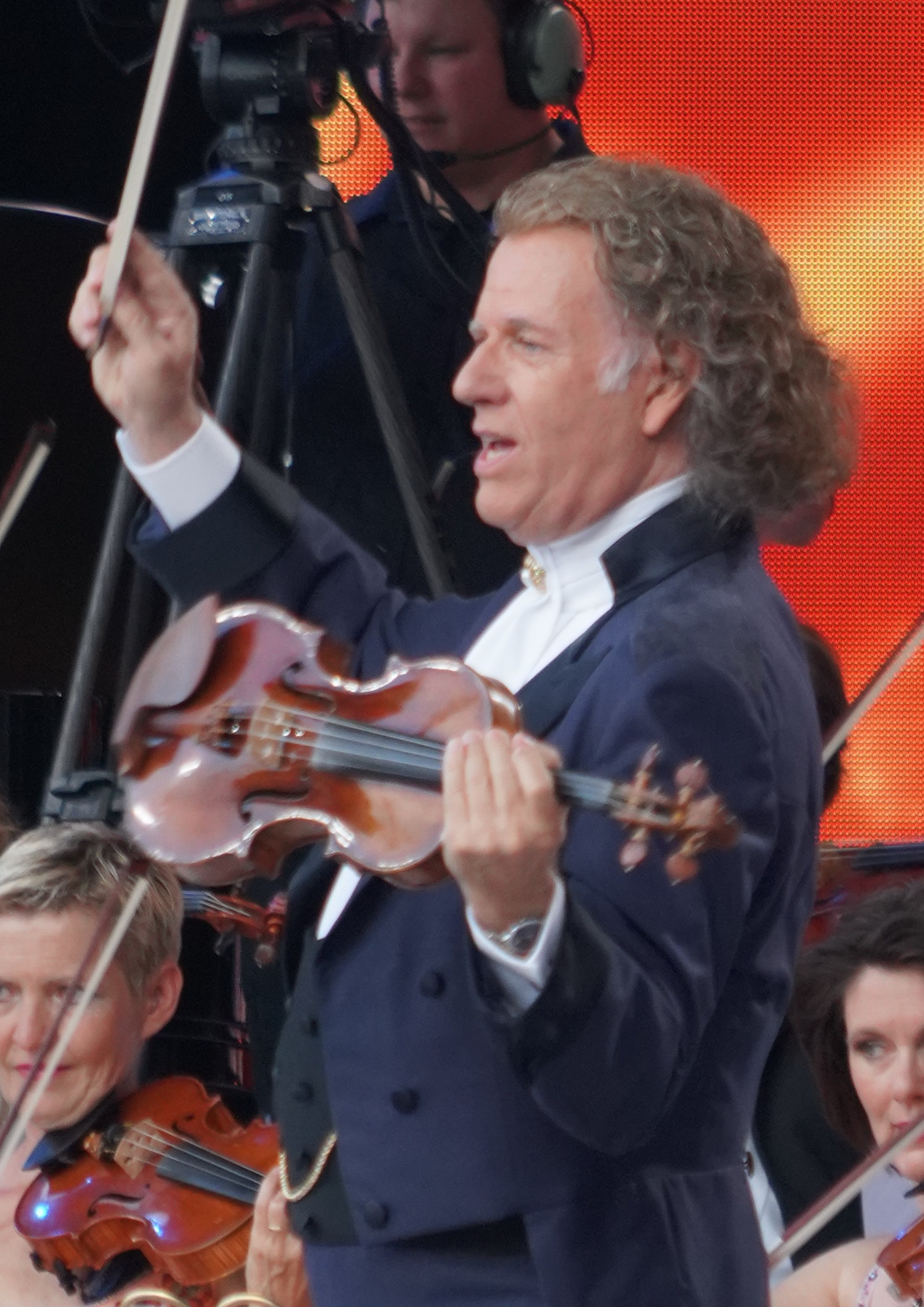
André Rieu

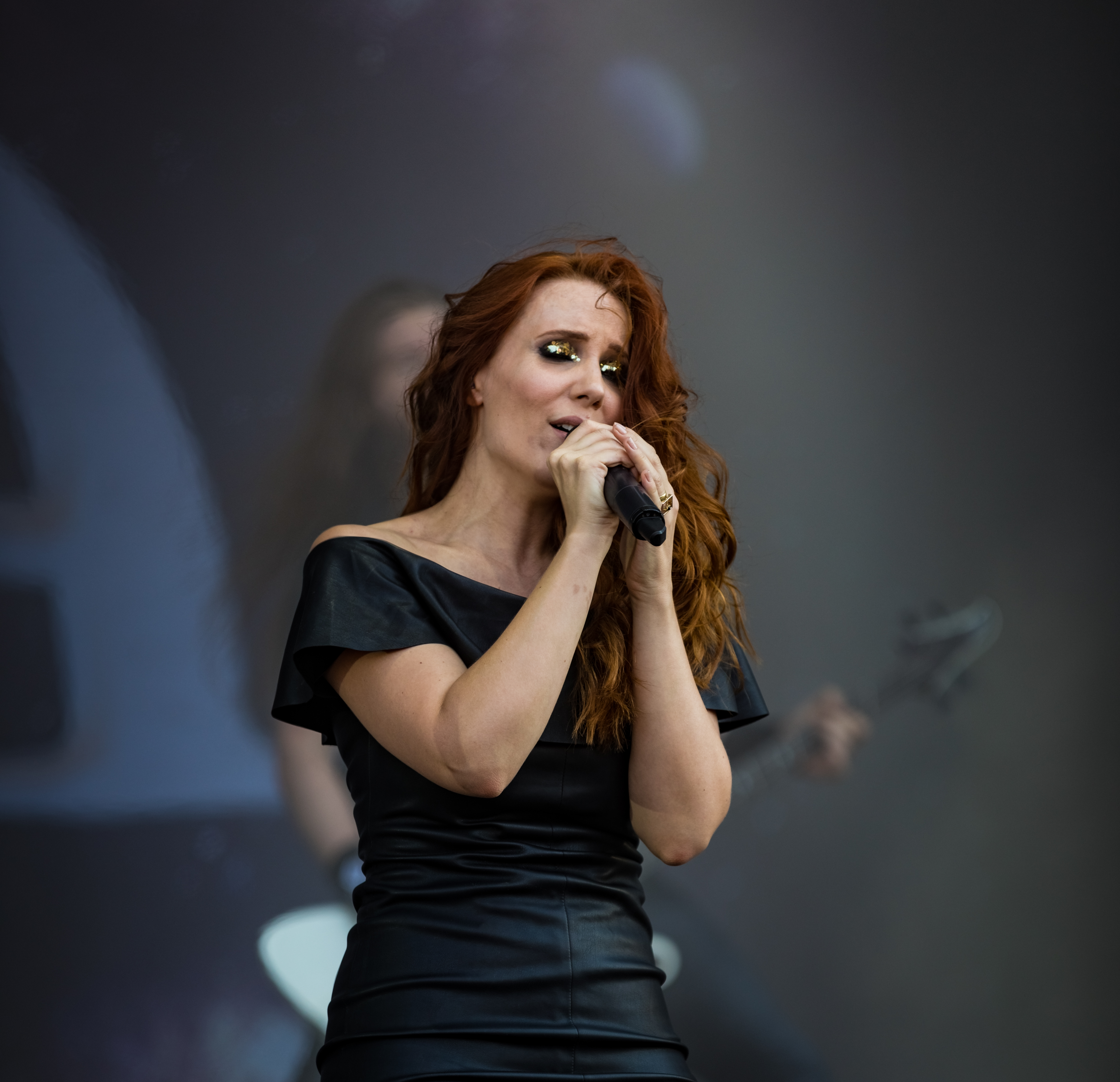
Simone Simons

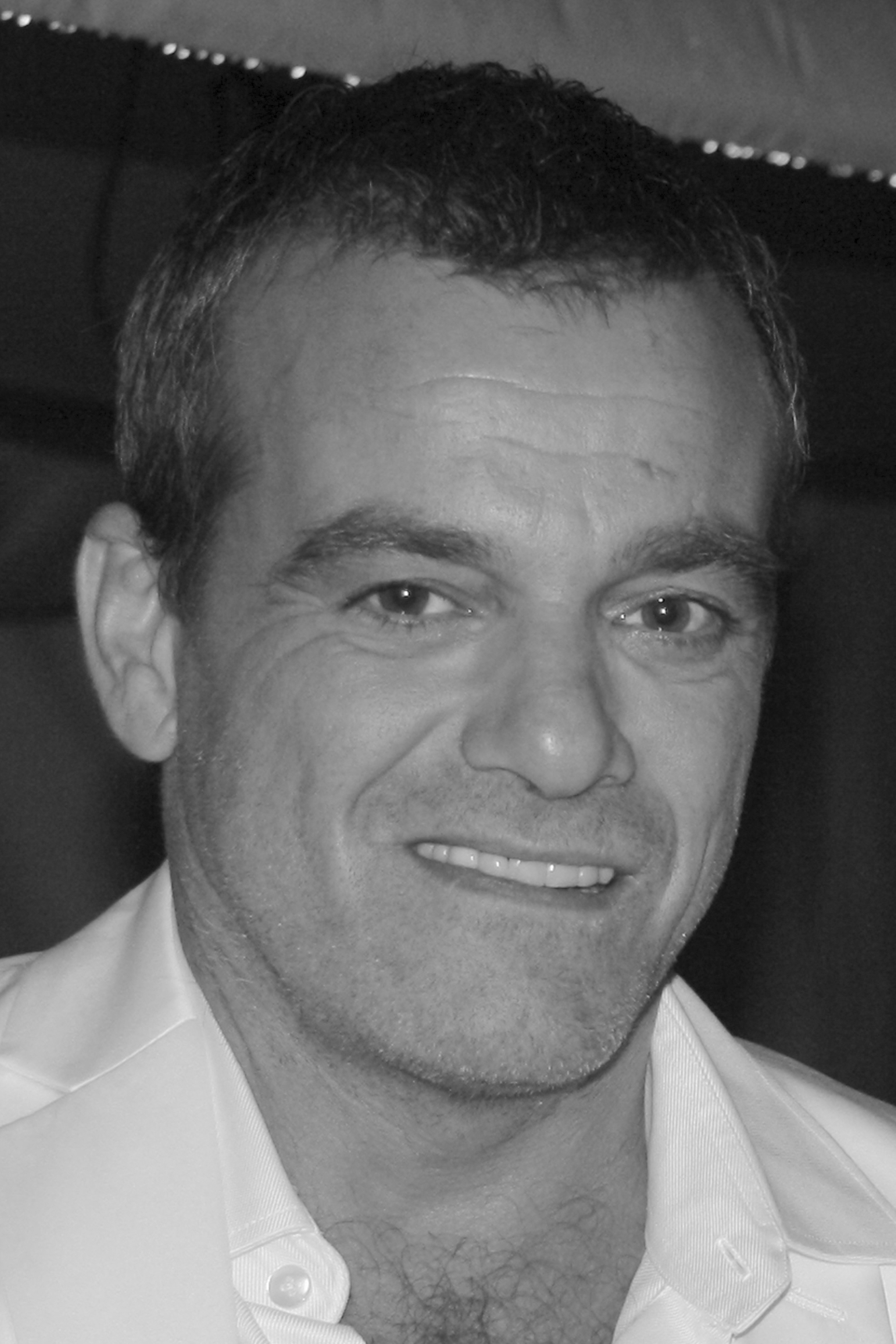
Jeroen Willems

- Jean-Eugène-Charles Alberti (1777–c. 1850) - Painter
- Willem Victor Bartholomeus (1825–1892) - Organist and conductor
- Carach Angren - Band
- Jan van Cleve (1646–1716) - Painter
- Jean-Baptiste Coclers (1696–1772) - Painter
- Louis Bernard Coclers (1740–1817) - Painter
- Jo Coenen (1949) - Architect and urban planner
- Gerrit Gerritsz Cuyp (c. 1565–1644) - Glazier and painter
- Eduard Cuypers (1859–1927) - Architect
- Pierre Cuypers (1827–1921) - Architect (designer of a.o. Amsterdam Rijksmuseum)
- Mike van Diem (1959) - Film director
- Rineke Dijkstra (1959) - Photographer
- Jan Frans van Douven (1656–1727) - Painter
- Epica - Band
- Charles Eyck (1897–1983) - Sculptor
- Hendrick Fromantiou (1633–1693) - Painter
- Hendrick Goltzius (1558–1617) - Painter and printmaker
- Hubert Goltzius (1526–1583) - Painter
- Marleen Gorris (1948) - Film director
- Henri Goovaerts (1865–1912) - Painter
- Wilhelm of Herle (fl. 1370) - Painter
- Toon Hermans (1916–2000) - Comedian, singer and writer
- Jan Baptist Herregouts (c. 1640–1721) - Painter
- Francine Houben (1955) - Architect
- Chantal Janzen (1979) - Actress
- Pierre Kemp (1886–1967) - Poet and painter
- Mathieu Kessels (1784–1836) - Sculptor
- Limbourg brothers (fl. 1385 – 1416) - Miniature painters
- Henk van der Linden (1925–2021) - Film director
- Marjon Lambriks (1949) - Soprano singer
- Henri Linssen (1805–1869) - Painter
- Theodoor van Loon (c. 1581–1649) - Painter
- Pierre Lyonnet (1706–1789) - Artist, engraver and illustrator
- David de Meyne (c. 1569–1620) - Painter
- Hadewych Minis (1959) - Actress, Golden Calf for Best Actress winner
- Connie Palmen (1955) - Writer
- Frits Peutz (1896–1974) - Architect
- Guido Pieters (1948) - Film director
- Pussycat - Band
- Christoffel Puytlinck (1640–c. 1679) - Painter
- Louis Raemaekers (1869–1956) - Painter and editorial cartoonist
- André Rieu (1949) - Musician, bandleader
- Frank Scheffer (1956) - Documentary film producer
- Heintje Simons (1955) - Singer and actor
- Simone Simons (1985) - Singer
- Huub Stapel (1954) - Actor
- Jan van Steffeswert (c. 1460–c. 1531) - Sculptor
- Johann Friedrich August Tischbein (1750–1812) - Painter
- Lotte Verbeek (1982) - Actress
- Dionys Verburg (1655–1722) - Painter
- Jacques Verheyen (1911–1989) - Glazier and painter
- Carel de Vogelaer (1653–1695) - Painter
- Hubert Vos (1855–1935) - Painter
- Jeroen Willems (1962–2012) - Actor, Golden Calf and Louis d'Or winner

Sports

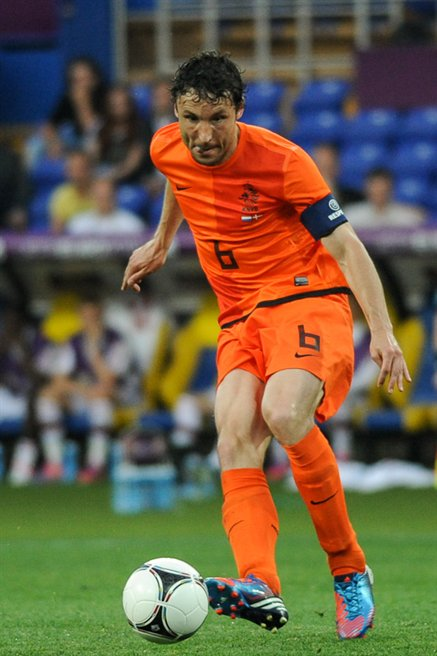
Mark Van Bommel

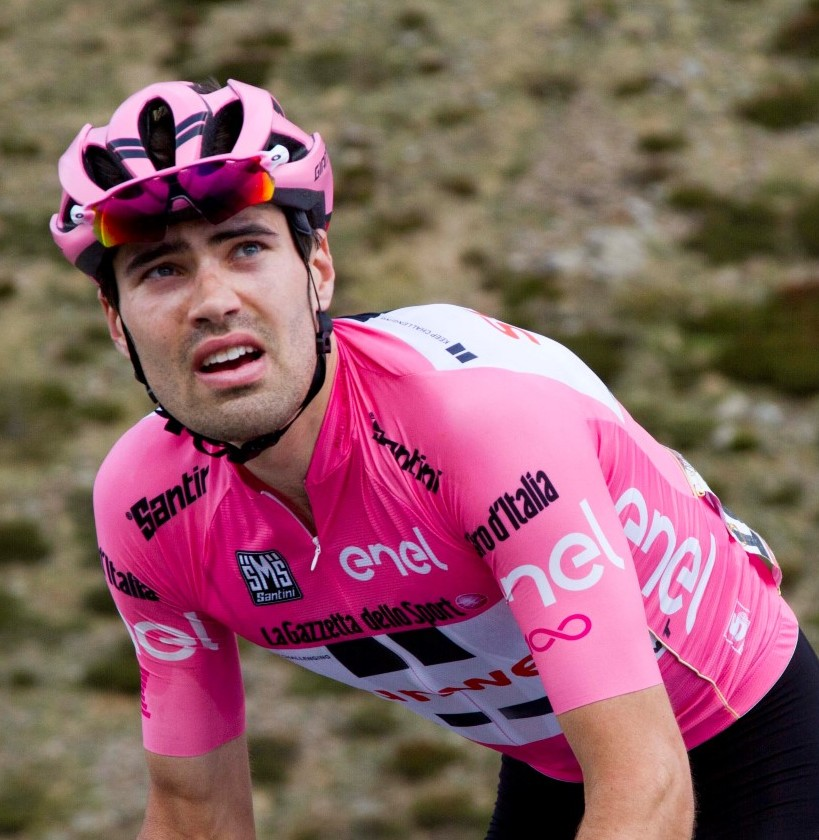
Tom Dumoulin

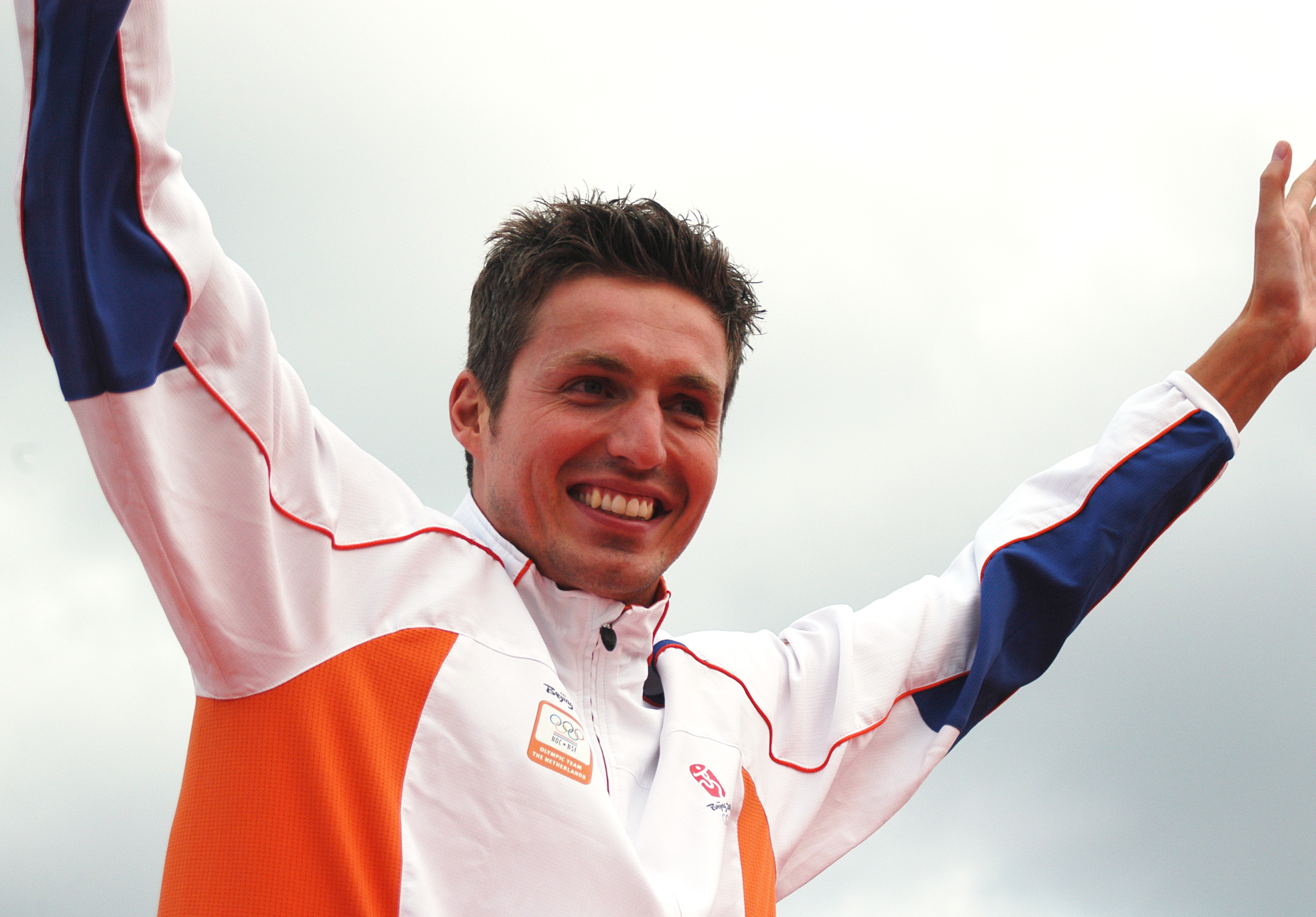
Pieter van den Hoogenband

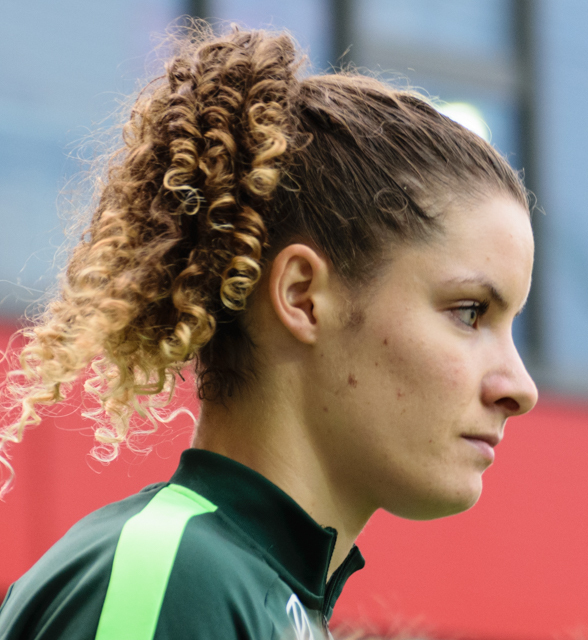
Dominique Janssen

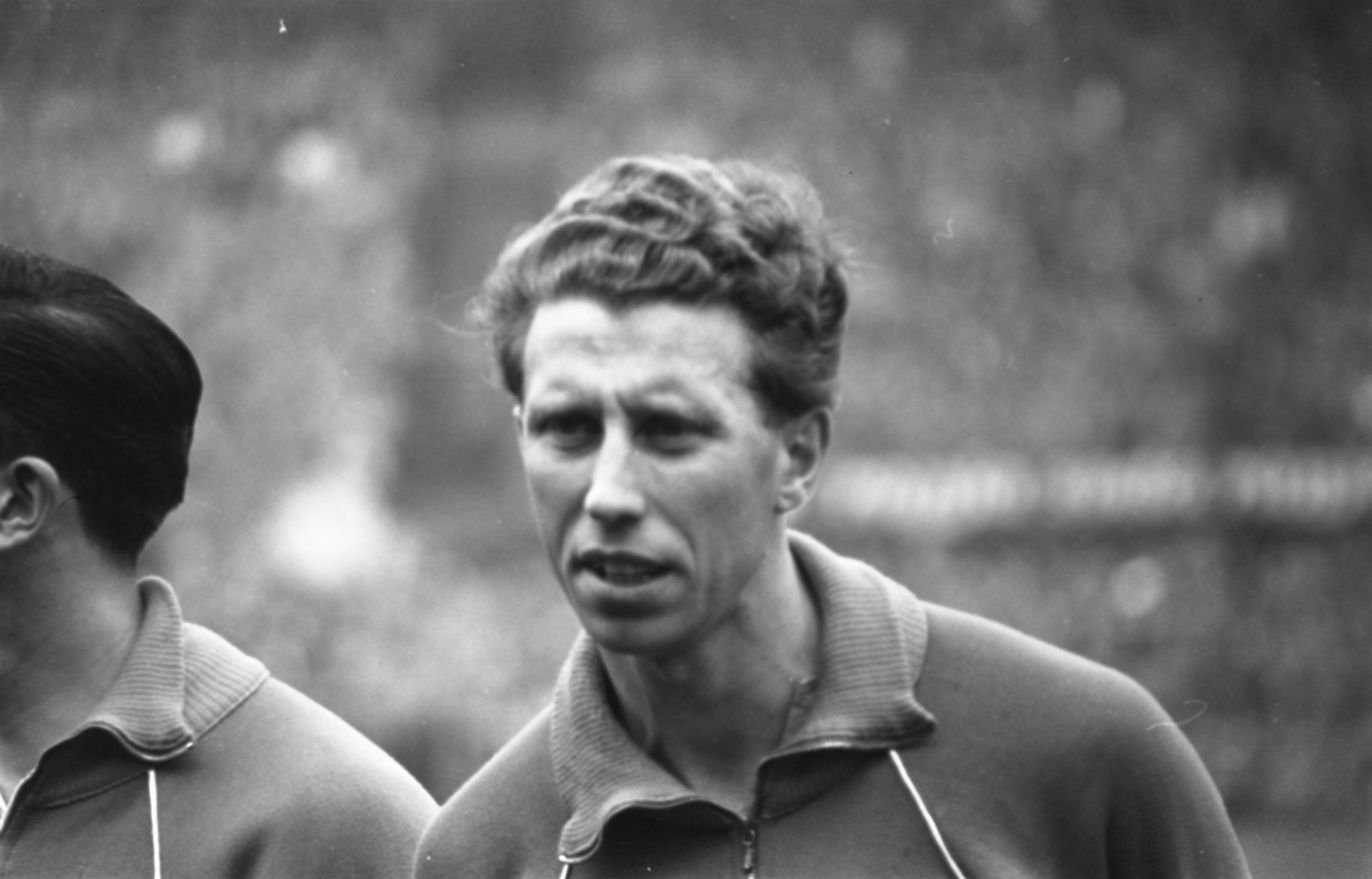
Jan Klaassens

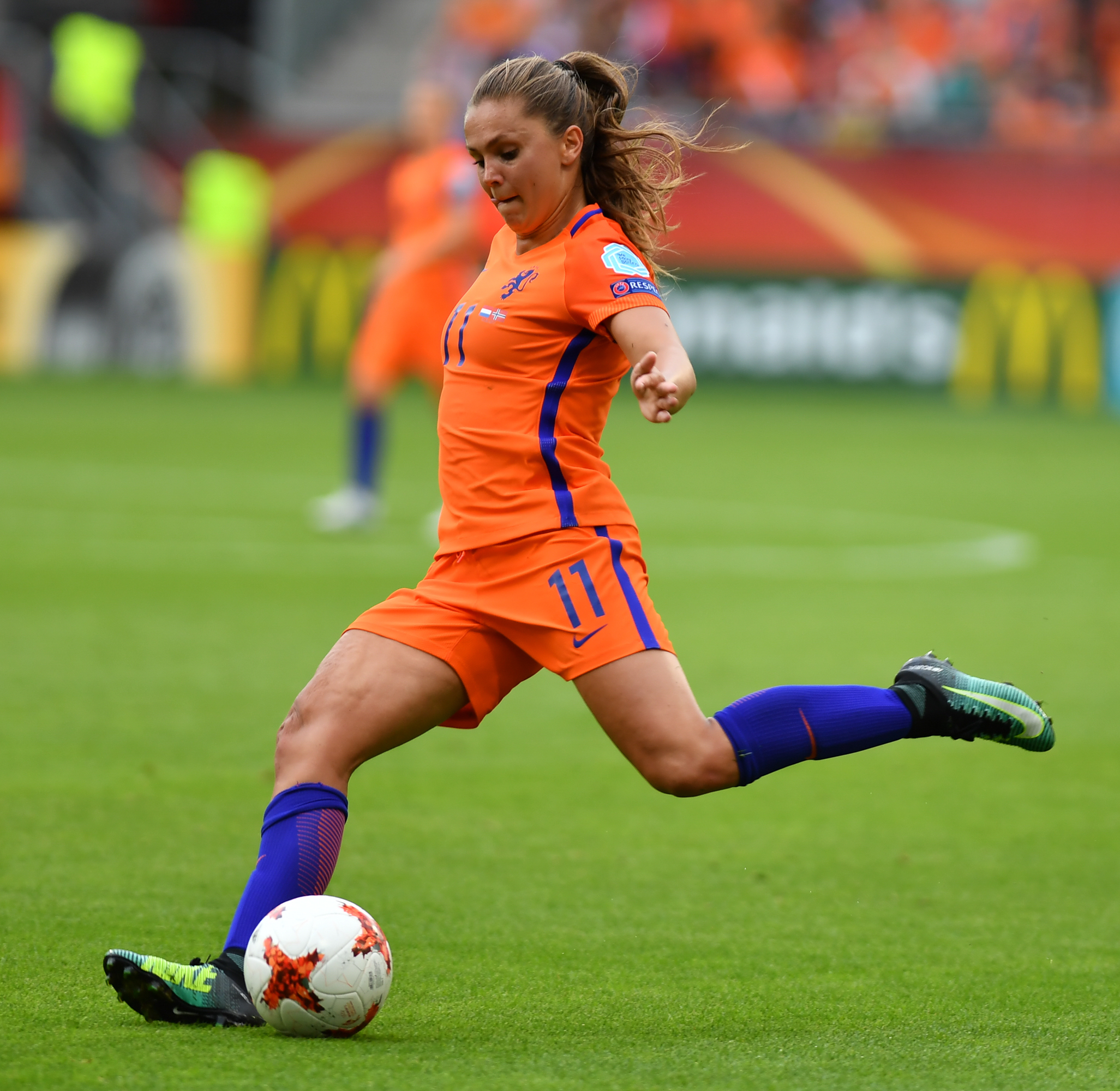
Lieke Martens

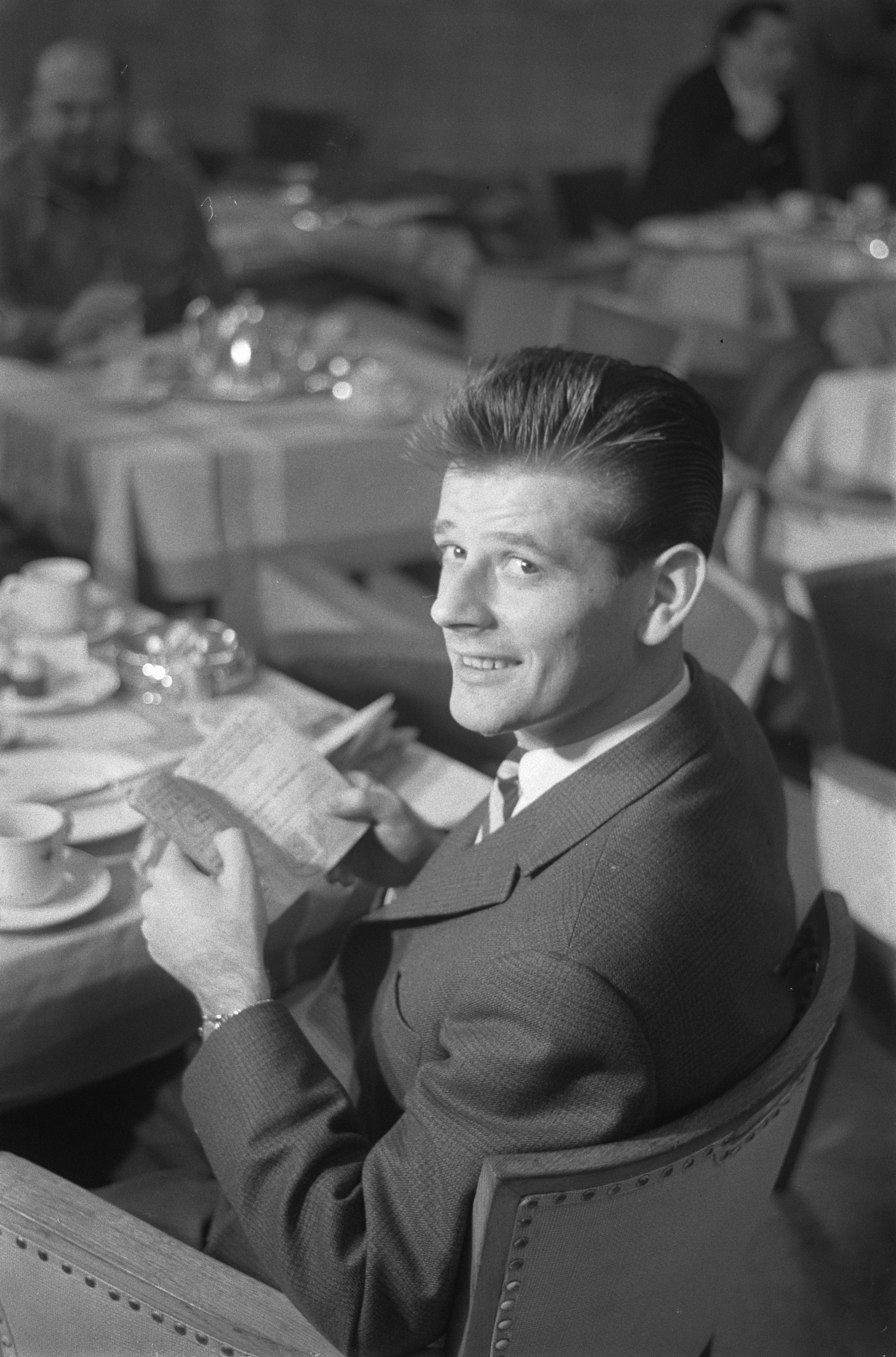
Jan Notermans

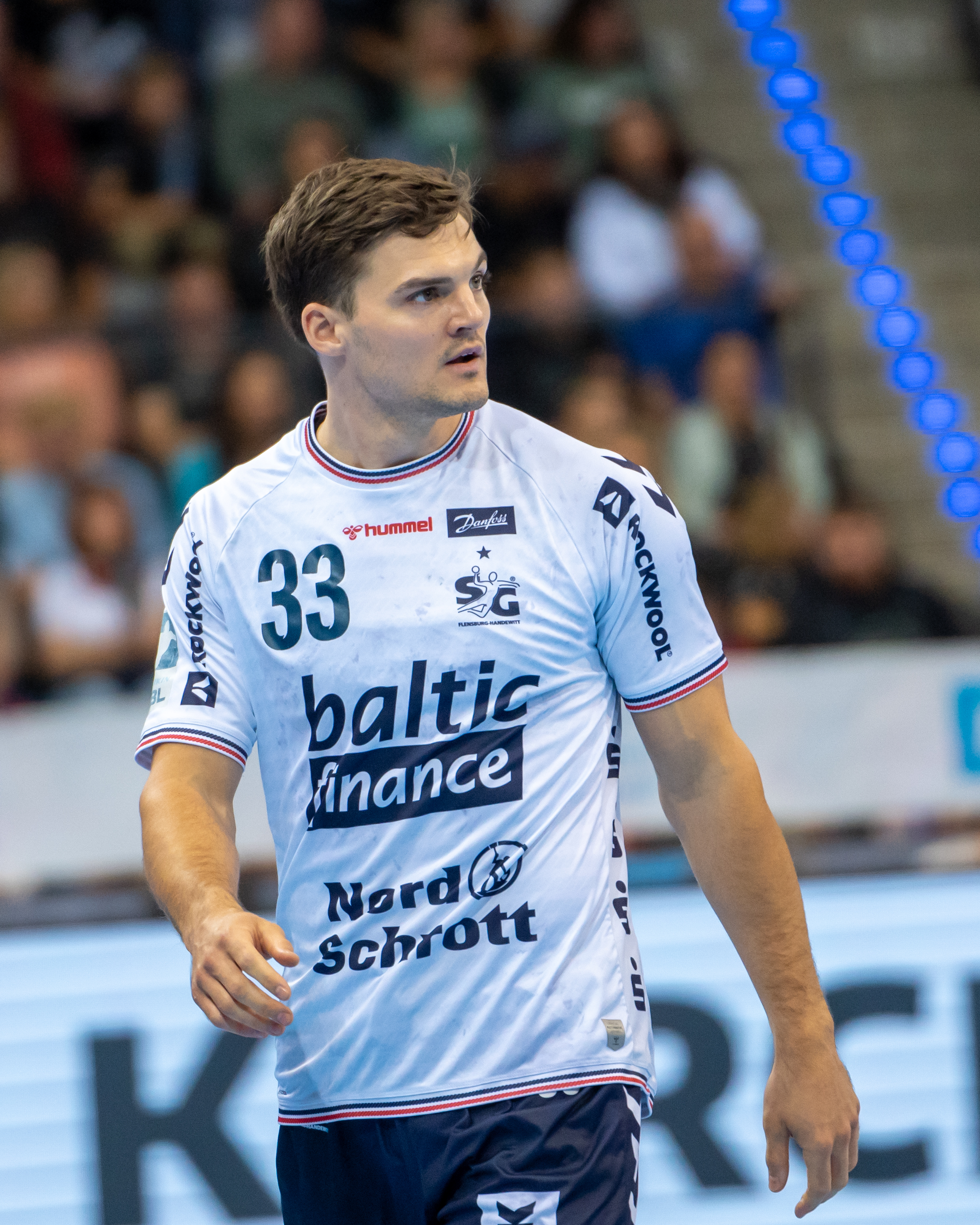
Kay Smits

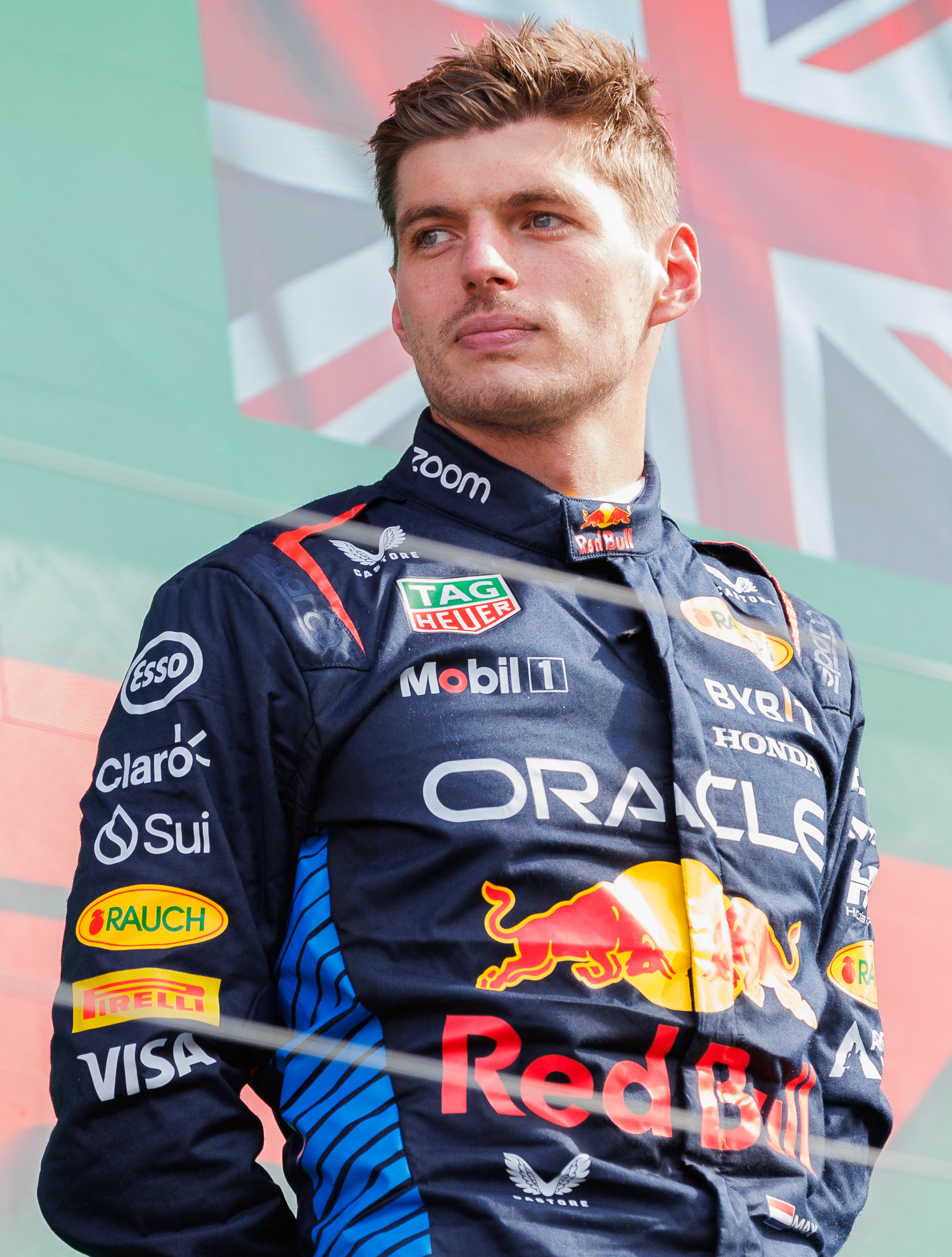
Max Verstappen

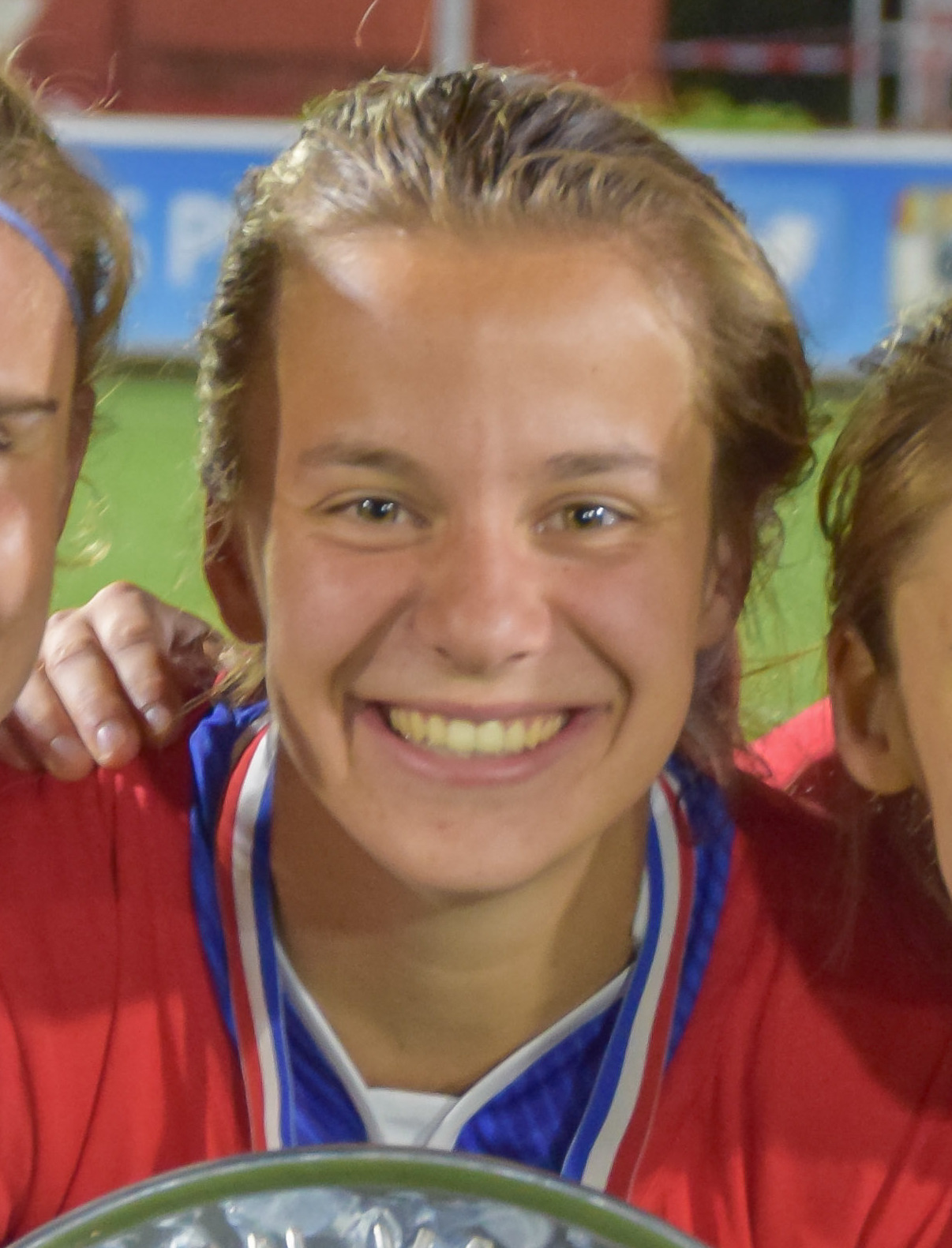
Lynn Wilms

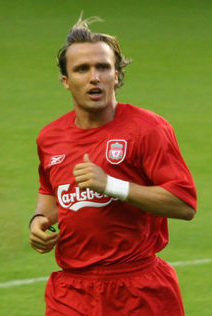
Boudewijn Zenden

- Gerard Bergholtz (1939) - Football player
- Eddy Beugels (1944–2018) - Cyclist
- Rens Blom (1977) - Athlete
- Mark van Bommel (1977) - Football player
- Ruben van Bommel (2004) - Football player
- Jo Bonfrère (1946) - Football player and coach
- Antonius Bouwens (1876–1963) - Sport shooter
- Bart Brentjens (1968) - Cyclist
- Willy Brokamp (1946) - Football player
- Roel Brouwers (1981) - Football player
- Harry Brüll (1935–2021) - Football player
- Jeu van Bun (1918–2002) - Football player
- Joop Campioni (1901–1962) - Football player
- Bart Carlier (1929–2017) - Football player
- Wiel Coerver (1924–2011) - Football manager
- Annemarie Cox (Anna Wood) (1966) - Canoer
- Annemiek Derckx (1954) - Sprint canoer
- Willy Dullens (1945) - Football player
- Tom Dumoulin (1990) - Cyclist
- Huub Felix (1895–1967) - Football player
- Mark Flekken (1993) - Football player
- Jan Gielens (1903–1964) - Football player
- Piet Giesen (1945) - Football player
- Mia Gommers (1939) - Athlete
- Guido Görtzen (1970) - Volleyball player
- Frits de Graaf (1926–1998) - Football player
- Gerard Gruisen (1935) - Football player
- Giel Haenen (1934–2024) - Football player
- Harry Heijnen (1940–2015) - Football player
- Jorrit Hendrix (1995) - Football player
- Max van Heeswijk (1973) - Cyclist
- Wim Hof (1959) - Extreme athlete and motivational speaker
- Kevin Hofland (1979) - Football player
- Germ Hofma (1925–2018) - Football player
- René Hofman (1961) - Football player
- Pieter van den Hoogenband (1978) - Swimmer
- Ben Hoogstede (1888–1962) - Football player
- Leo Horn (1916–1995) - Football referee
- Dominique Janssen (1995) - Football player
- Willy Janssen (1960) - Football player
- Sjefke Janssen (1919–2014) - Cyclist
- Myrthe Kemper-Moorrees (1994) - Football player
- Pierre Kerkhoffs (1936–2021) - Football player
- Jan Klaassens (1931–1983) - Football player
- Coy Koopal (1932–2003) - Football player
- Jan Krekels (1947) - Cyclist
- Jan Lambrichs (1915–1990) - Cyclist
- Romée Leuchter (2001) - Football player
- Janou Levels (2000) - Football player
- Vanity Lewerissa (1991) - Football player
- Edward Linskens (1968) - Football player
- Marie-Louise Linssen-Vaessen (1928–1993) - Freestyle swimmer
- René Lotz (1938) - Cyclist
- Eric van der Luer (1965) - Football player
- Jo Maas (1954) - Cyclist
- Dirk Marcellis (1988) - Football player
- Lieke Martens (1992) - Football player
- Pierre Massy (1900–1958) - Football player
- Erik Meijer (1969) - Football player
- Manoe Meulen (1978) - Football player
- Kim Mourmans (1995) - Football player
- Danny Nelissen (1970) - Cyclist
- Jean Nelissen (1936–2010) - Sports journalist
- Tom Nijssen (1964) - Tennis player
- Jan Nolten (1930–2014) - Cyclist
- Jan Notermans (1933) - Football player
- Larissa Nüsser (2000) - Handball player
- Joep Packbiers (1875–1957) - Archer
- Maartje Paumen (1985) - Hockey player
- Wout Poels (1987) - Cyclist
- Willy Quadackers (1937–2020) - Football player
- Fernando Ricksen (1976–2019) - Football player
- Gonnelien Rothenberger (1969) - Equestrian
- Sjeng Schalken (1976) - Tennis player
- Lisa Scheenaard (1988) - Rower
- Harry Schreurs (1901–1973) - Football player
- Perr Schuurs (1999) - Football player
- Inger Smits (1994) - Handball player
- Kay Smits (1997) - Handball player
- Jeu Sprengers (1938–2008) - KNVB football chairman
- Huub Stevens (1953) - Football player and coach
- Karin Stevens (1989) - Football player
- Wilbert Suvrijn (1962) - Football player
- Arjen Teeuwissen (1971) - Equestrian
- Stan Valckx (1963) - Football player
- Arnold Vanderlyde (1963) - Boxer
- Mark Veens (1978) - Freestyle swimmer
- Lambert Verdonk (1944) - Football player
- Sef Vergoossen (1947) - Football manager
- Paul Verhaegh (1983) - Football player
- Joeri Verlinden (1988) - Swimmer
- Pierre Vermeulen (1956) - Football player
- Jos Verstappen (1972) - Racing driver
- Max Verstappen (1997) - Racing driver and son of Jos
- Ria Vestjens (1959) - Football player
- Heinz Vroomen (1918–2003) - Football player
- Ronald Waterreus (1970) - Football player
- Steve Wijler (1996) - Archer
- Ad Wijnands (1959) - Cyclist
- Lynn Wilms (2000) - Football player
- Peter Winnen (1957) - Cyclist
- Fons van Wissen (1933–2015) - Football player
- Boudewijn Zenden (1976) - Football player

== Nature ==
In 2012, from April 5 to October 7, the ten-yearly world horticulture expo "Floriade" was held in Venlo.

Nationally and internationally known are nature films and nature television series produced by film director Maurice Nijsten and nature protector Jo Erkens.

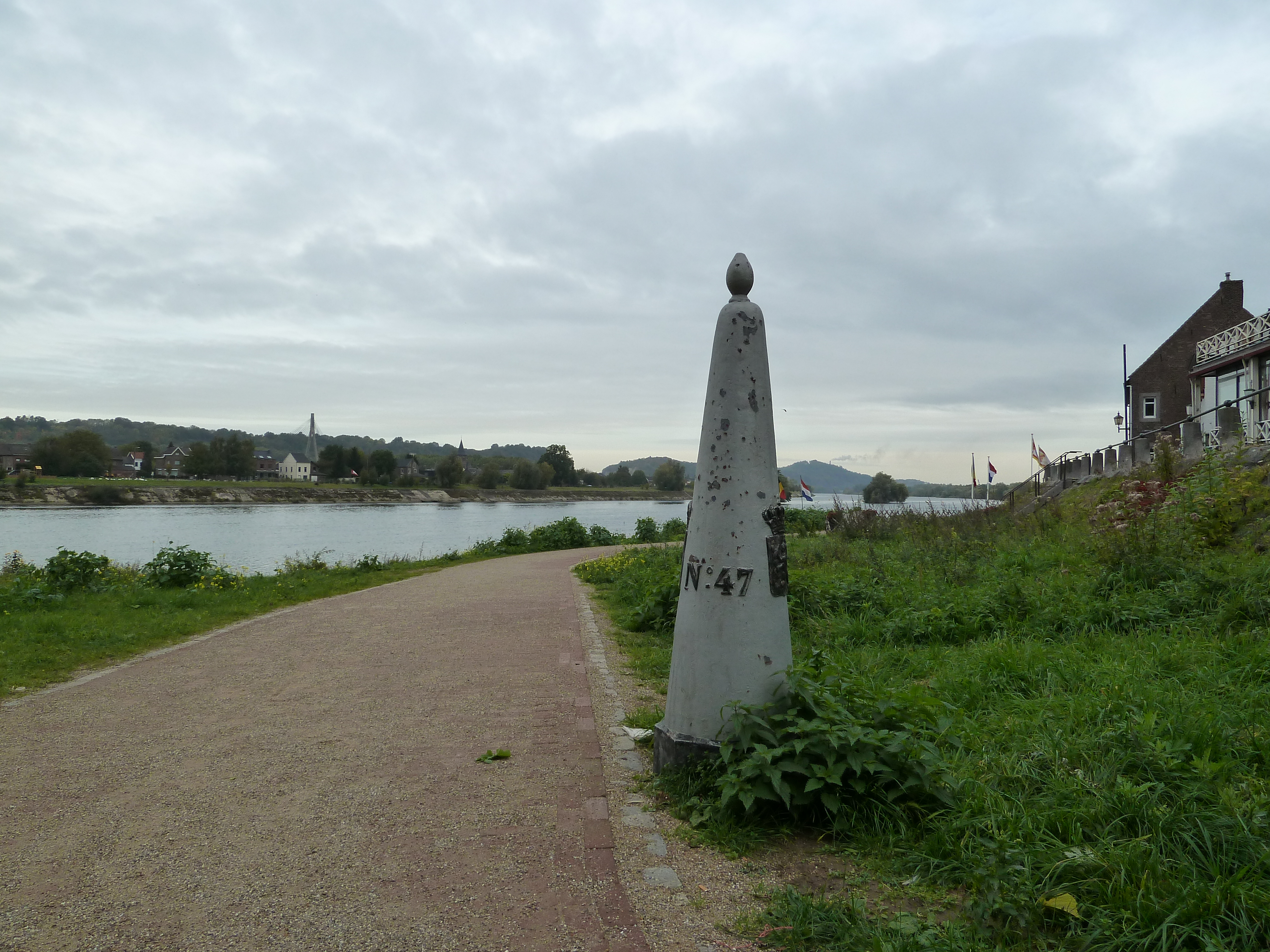
At Eijsden the river Meuse enters this province as well as the country

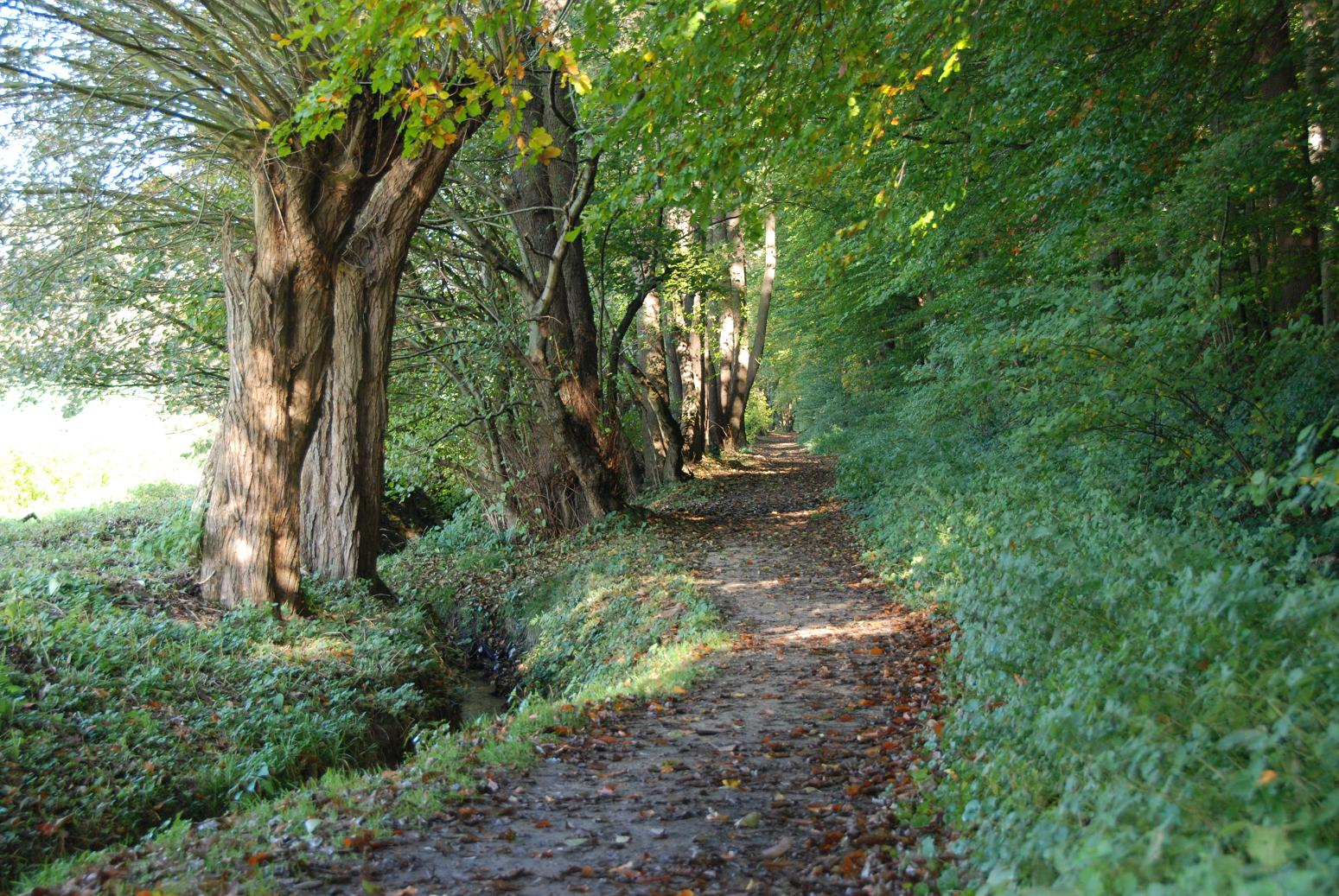
Path in Southern Limburgian Ravensbos

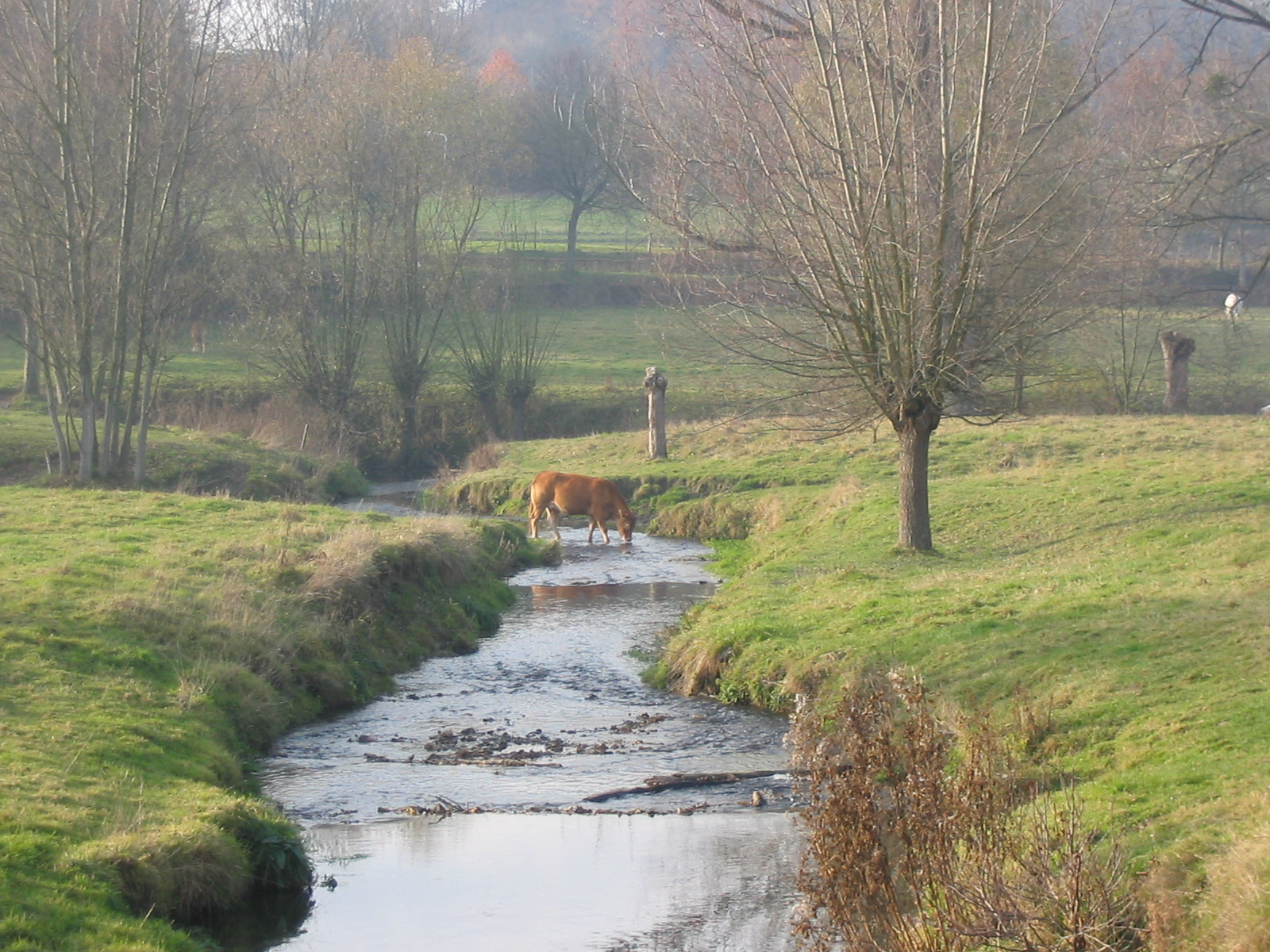
River Gulp near Slenaken

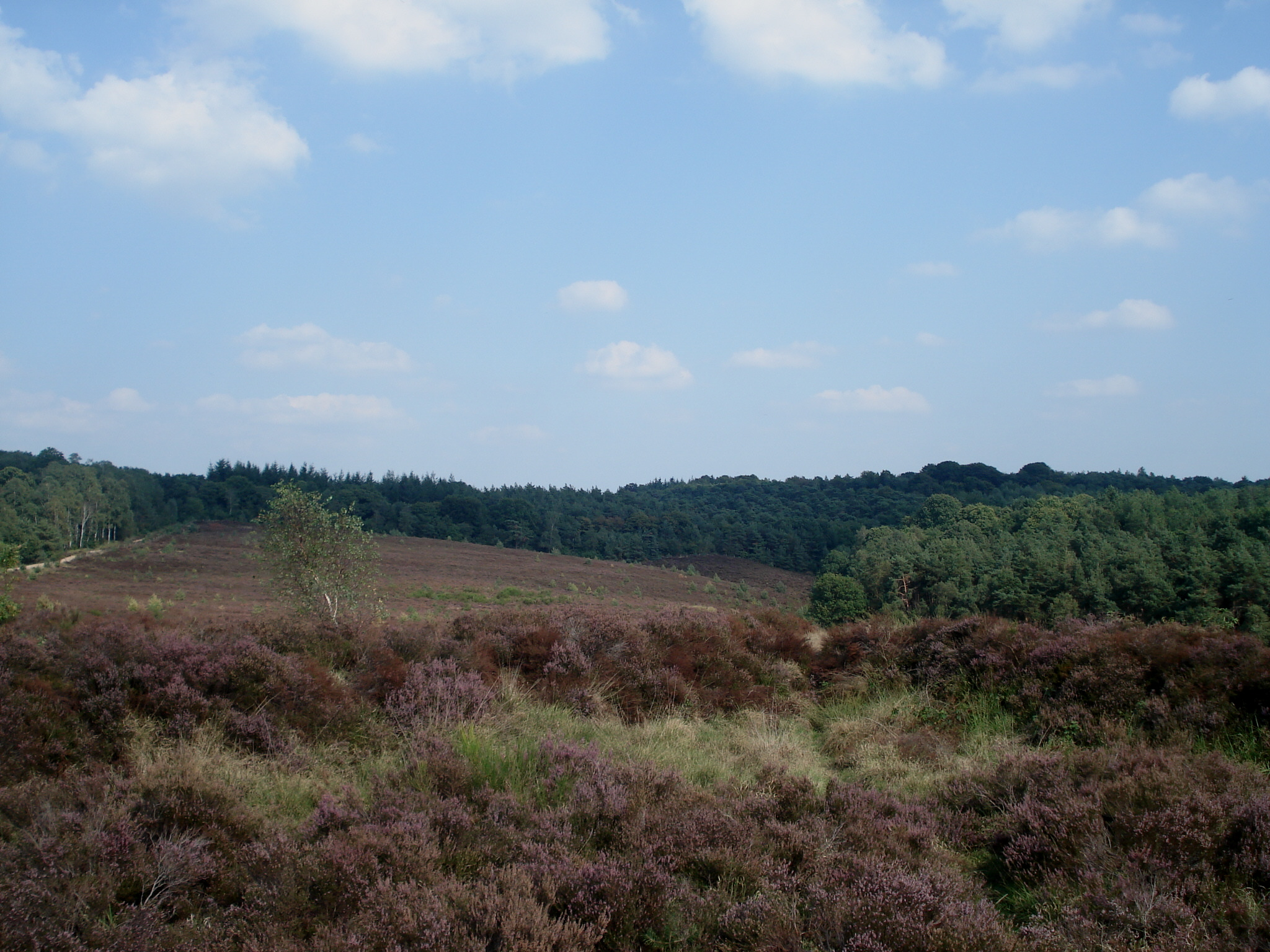
Site at the Mooker heath in Northern Limburg

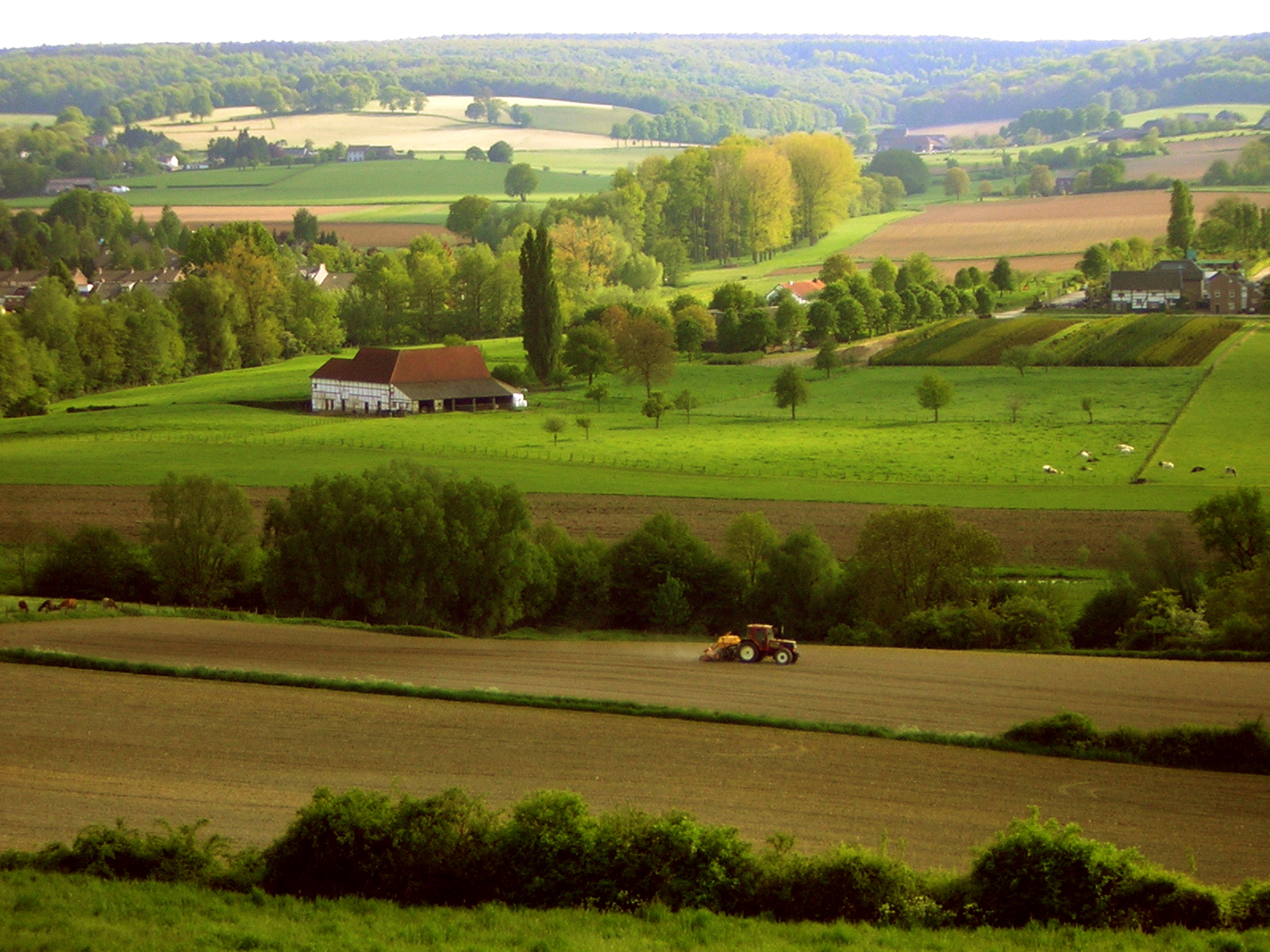
Oud-Lemiers near Vaals, as seen from the Schneeberg in Germany

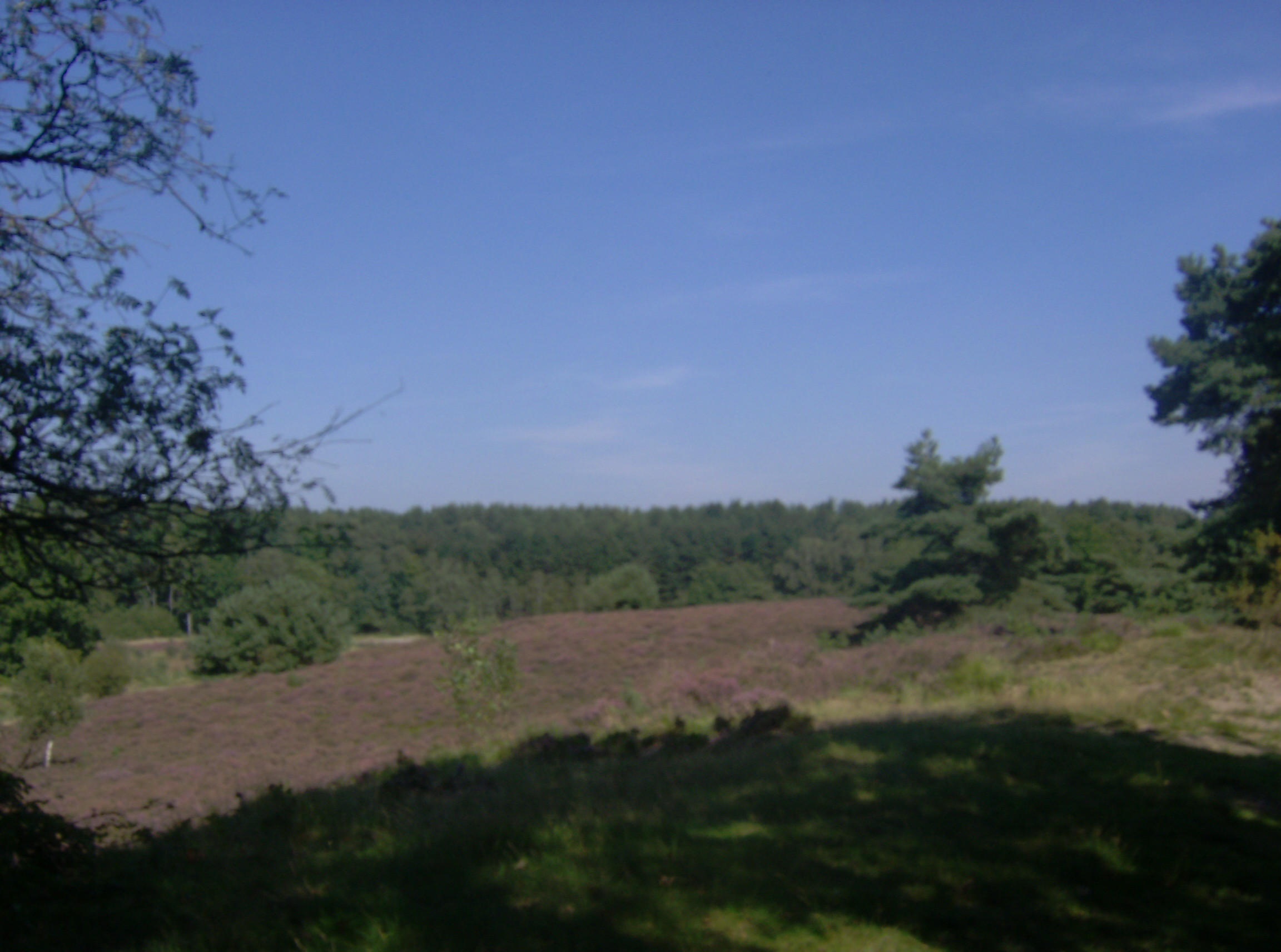
Brunssummer heath in South Eastern Limburg

== See also ==
- Buckriders
- Campine (De Kempen)
- Peel (De Peel)
- Salient
