= Panachaiki F.C. =

Men's association football team in Greece

Panachaiki
- Full name: Panachaiki Gymnastiki Enosi (Panachaean Gymnastic Union)
- Nicknames: Kokkinómavri (The Red and Blacks); I Megáli Kyría tis Peloponnísou (The Great Lady of the Peloponnese)
- Short name: PFC
- Founded: 14 June 1891; 135 years ago (as Panachaikos Gymnastikos Syllogos)
- Ground: Kostas Davourlis Stadium
- Capacity: 11,321
- Chairman: Işıtan Gün
- Manager: Periklis Amanatidis
- League: Gamma Ethniki
- 2025–26: Gamma Ethniki (Group 4), 7th (Won Play-outs)
Home colours	Away colours

Panachaiki F.C. is a Greek professional football club based in Patras, Greece, that competes in Gamma Ethniki, the third tier of Greek football. Founded on 14 June 1891, they have reached the Greek Cup semi-finals twice (1979, 1997). It was the first Greek club outside both the Athens and Thessaloniki metropolitan areas to represent Greece in a European competition, the 1973–74 UEFA Cup.

In 1979, the department became professional and independent. They have played their home games in various grounds since their first official game in 1899, mainly the Kostas Davourlis Stadium, their traditional home ground, and the Pampeloponnisiako Stadium.

== History ==
=== Establishment ===
The history of Panachaiki G.E. began on 14 June 1891, when Panachaikos Gymnastikos Syllogos (Greek: Παναχαϊκός Γυμναστικός Σύλλογος, lit. 'Panachaean Gymnastic Club') was founded. In 1894, a rival sports club, Gymnastiki Etaireia Patron (Greek: Γυμναστική Εταιρεία Πατρών, lit. 'Patras Gymnastic Company'), was founded in Patras by former Panachaikos' members. It was only in 1923 that the two clubs agreed to merge, forming Panachaiki Gymnastiki Enosi.

The football department was founded in 1899 and played its first friendly game against a team of British sailors the same year, winning 4–2. In 1902, Morphy established a football team and a Gymnastics Company, playing many friendly games with each other and other clubs from Patras.

=== Early years ===
==== 1923–1940 ====
Panachaiki's first sections were founded in 1923. The players on the football team were athletes from the club's other departments, Italian immigrants and members of the British community of Patras. Due to the lack of rivals, the first games were played against the crews of foreign warships arriving in the city.

In 1924, Panachaiki had two equivalent soccer teams, A and B, since both the Panachaikos and the Gymnastics Company had football sections. As a result, some players left Panachaiki and created other clubs in the following years. At the same time, in 1922, with the Asia Minor Catastrophe, thousands of refugees arrived in Patras, bringing with them their love of football and establishing several new clubs. This situation led to the secession of the associations from SEGAS and the establishment of the Hellenic Football Federation of Patras in 1927. In the same year, the new association founded a championship, in which Panachaiki was a leading contender, prevailing many times until 1959. The championship was organized by Panachaiki from 1923–24 to 1925–26. At that time, the Greek championship was a tournament between the champions of Athens, Piraeus and Thessaloniki, with the Hellenic Football Federation excluding provincial clubs for many years. Patras, due to disagreements between the clubs and disobedience to the Epirus Achaia, failed to organize a regular championship and this resulted in its exclusion from the Greek championship.

Nevertheless, the Athenian clubs held friendly games in the city, culminating on 11 August 1945, when Panachaiki played a Greek XI at home, losing 7–1. In 1928, Panachaiki faced Panathinaikos, who won 4–3. In 1929, they played against AEK, losing 0–1, 0–2 and 0–6, while against Olympiacos they were defeated 2–5 in the same year, followed by 1–7 and 0–7 defeats in 1930 and 1934 respectively. The significant difference in ability was due, among other factors, to the Athens and Piraeus teams' 25 years of experience in tournament events.

==== 1940–1953 ====
In 1940, all sporting activity in Greece was suspended due to World War II. Some friendly games were played during the occupation, while in 1943 a Patras cup was organized. Upon the end of the war, the local championship was restarted. Several Panachaiki players were killed during the Greco-Italian war. In this period, Panachaiki played in the Patras Championship, but failed to qualify for the Panhellenic Championship.

=== 1954–1961: National championships ===
Panachaiki participated in the Panhellenic Championship for the first time in the 1953–54 season. It was in this year that the Championship first admitted teams from outside Athens, Piraeus, and Thessaloniki. A Regional Championship was inaugurated, consisting of a Southern Group and a Northern Group. Panachaiki participated in the Southern Group and won, thus qualifying for the final round of the Panhellenic Championship, where they finished in 6th and last place. Two seasons later, the team took third place in the Southern Group behind Olympiacos and Ethnikos Piraeus, while the 1956–57 also brought a third-place finish. In 1957–58, Panachaiki finished second in the Southern Group, and in 1958-59 were beaten in the qualifiers by Panegialios in the Southern Group, as they were again the following year.

=== 1961–1975 ===
In 1962-63, Panachaiki participated in the first season of the newly established second tier, the Beta Ethniki (known since 2019 as the Football League). From then until 2007, Panachaiki would not compete in a lower league. Panachaiki immediately starred in the Beta Ethniki, targeting promotion every year, which they secured in 1969. But Panachaiki's first year in the Alpha Ethniki was disastrous, as they were accused of attempting to fix a match against Aris and docked 13 points. They finished bottom of the table and were relegated. The following year, however, Panachaiki performed well again in the Beta Ethniki and returned immediately to the top flight.

Panachaiki had their greatest success in the early- and mid-1970s. In 1971, they returned to the Alpha Ethniki and a golden era began with a team of Davourlis, Rigas, Stravopodis, Michalopoulos and others achieving success, culminating in qualification for the UEFA Cup. The club ended the season 6th with 11 wins, 14 draws, 9 defeats, and a total of 40 goals scored and 35 conceded. At this time, the club's average match attendance was 8,773, the second highest among the provincial teams.

In 1972-73, Panachaiki took 4th position in the league and qualified for the UEFA Cup. They denied PAOK the championship with a 5–3 in the last game at the Toumba Stadium.

The team subsequently took part in the 1973–74 UEFA Cup, eliminating Grazer AK before losing to Twente. Former Manchester United manager Wilf McGuinness took over as head coach for the 1974–75 season, before returning to England eighteen months later.

In 1974, Panachaiki finished sixth. Kostas Davourlis' record 10 million drachma transfer to Olympiacos was a powerful blow to the red-black fans' dreams of winning a championship. In 1975, Panachaiki finished in seventh place.

=== 1976–2004 ===
In 1975-76, Panachaiki finished tenth and began their downward spiral, as the club's star players began to leave and the team aged. Every year thereafter, the team finished in the bottom half of the table until their eventual relegation to the Beta Ethniki in 1980-81. Since then, Panachaiki have tended to oscillate between the first and second tiers of Greek football.

Panachaiki were again relegated from the Alpha Ethniki in 1987-88. Fans demonstrated on the main streets of the city, setting up barricades and clashing with the police, leaving 15 injured. In the summer of 1996, Panachaiki participated in the Intertoto Cup, taking part in a European event for the second time. In 2003, with the intervention of then-minister Evangelos Venizelos, Panachaiki were punished for debts and eliminated from the Football League.

=== 2004–2015 ===
In 2004, Panachaiki were absorbed by Patraikos, a debt-free Beta Ethniki team. This created the Panahaiki 2005, who took part in the Beta Ethniki in 2004. Nevertheless, the team was relegated the following season to the Gamma Ethniki.

Although they managed to rise to the Beta Etniki in 2011, Panachaiki were relegated and fined EUR 300,000 for bribery in a match against Olympiakos Chersonissos. Simultaneously, in relation to the same case, a fine and a five-year ban were imposed upon the club's chairman Alexis Kougias. However, the EPAA Appeals Committee later allowed the team to continue in the second tier and replaced the original penalty with a 5-point deduction. Kougias was also acquitted.

In 2015, Panachaiki's chairman left the club. The team were relegated the same year to the Gamma Ethniki with a squad of only 13 players.

== Stadiums ==
The team's privately owned arena is the Kostas Davourlis Stadium, with a capacity of 11,321 spectators. Panachaiki have also used the municipality-operated Pampeloponnisiako Stadium, which has a capacity of 23,588.

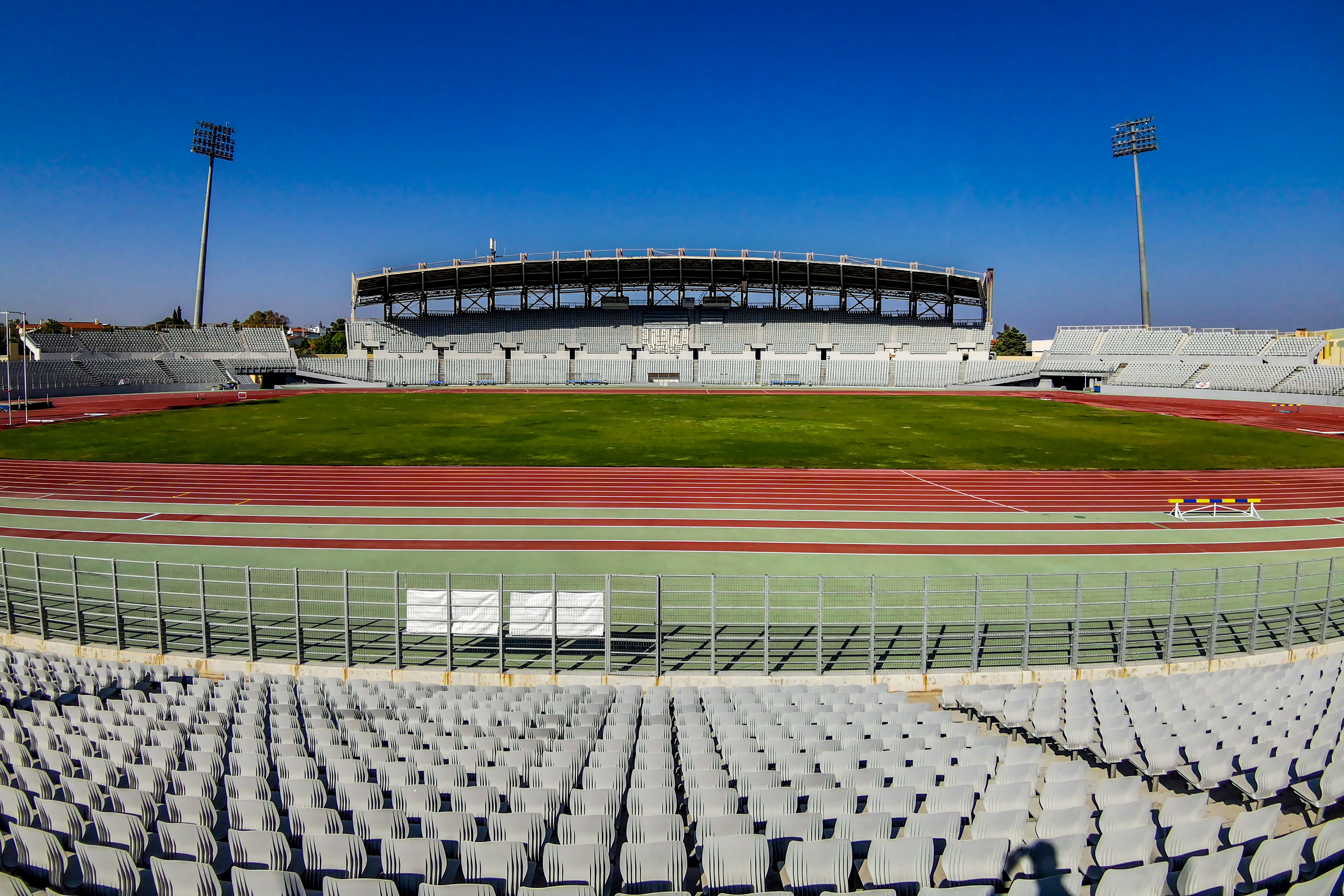
Pampeloponisiako Stadium is also used for track and field events.

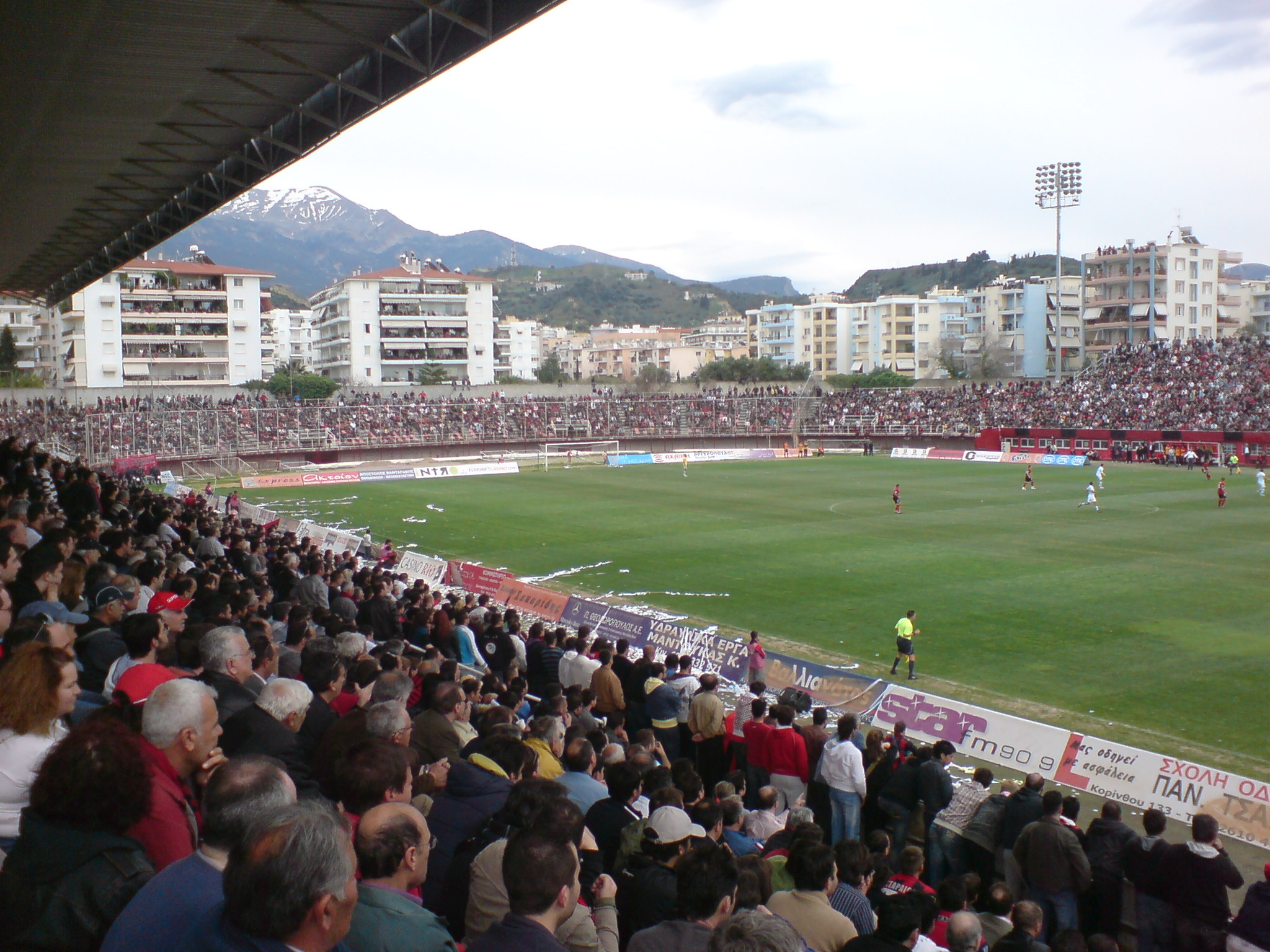
Kostas Davourlis Stadium in a sold-out match; Panachaiki vs Rodos for the 2008–09 Gamma Ethniki season.

== Honours ==
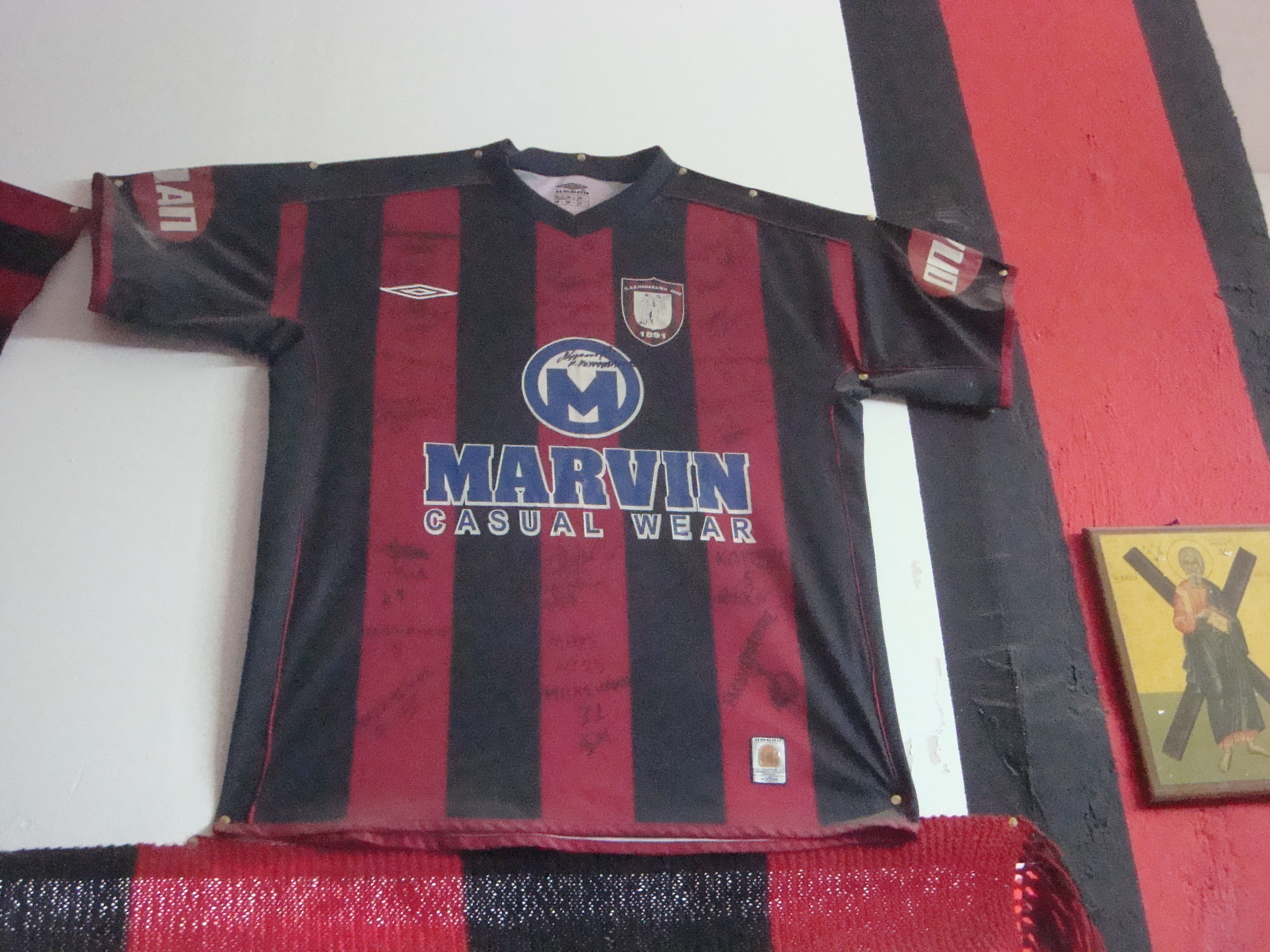
Shirt of the team

=== Domestic ===
==== Leagues ====
- Super League 2

Winners (6) (record): 1963–64, 1968–69, 1970–71, 1981–82, 1983–84, 1986–87

- Gamma Ethniki

Winners (3): 2010–11, 2016–17, 2021-22

- Achaia FCA First Division

Winners (12): 1928–29, 1929–30, 1930–31, 1933–34, 1935–36, 1942–43, 1953–54, 1955–56, 1956–57, 1957–58, 1960–61, 1961–62

- O.P.A.P. Summer Championship

Winners (1): 1972

==== Cups ====
- Greek Cup

Semi-finals (2): 1979, 1997

== Records and statistics ==
=== Club records ===
==== Matches ====
- First European match: Grazer AK 0–1 Panachaiki, 1973–74 UEFA Cup, 19 September 1973
- First European win: Grazer AK 0–1 Panachaiki, 1973–74 UEFA Cup, 19 September 1973

==== Wins ====
- Record win: 10–0 vs Pangytheatikos, Gamma Ethniki, 22 March 2026
- Record Alpha Ethniki / Super League win: 6–1 vs Olympiakos Nicosia, 12 December 1971
- Record Beta Ethniki / Super League 2 win: 7–0 vs Apollon Pontou, 10 March 2020
- Record Greek Cup win: 6–0 vs Acharnaikos, 23 August 2000
- Record European win: 1–0 vs Grazer AK, 1973–74 UEFA Cup, 19 September 1973

==== Defeats ====
- Record European defeat: 7–0 vs FC Twente, 1973–74 UEFA Cup, 7 November 1973
- Record Alpha Ethniki / Super League defeat: 6–0 on three occasions:
  - vs Panathinaikos, 29 April 1979
  - vs Olympiacos, 16 February 1986
  - vs PAOK, 29 March 1998
- Record Beta Ethniki / Super League 2 defeat: 5–0 on two occasions:
  - vs Ergotelis, 14 May 2006
  - vs Levadiakos, 15 April 2007
- Record Greek Cup defeat: 5–0 vs Apollon Athens, 28 May 1997

=== European record ===
Season	Competition	Round	Club	Home	Away	Aggregate
1973–74	UEFA Cup	First round	(Austria) Grazer AK	2–1	1–0	3–1
1973–74	UEFA Cup	Second round	(Netherlands) Twente	1–1	0–7	1–8
1997	UEFA Intertoto Cup	Group 5	(Norway) Stabæk	1–1	—	4th
1997	UEFA Intertoto Cup	Group 5	(Russia) Dynamo Moscow	—	1–2	4th
1997	UEFA Intertoto Cup	Group 5	(Faroe Islands) B36 Tórshavn	4–2	—	4th
1997	UEFA Intertoto Cup	Group 5	(Belgium) Racing Genk	—	2–4	4th

=== Season to season ===
Season	Division	Pos.
1960–61	Beta Ethniki	2nd
1961–62	Beta Ethniki	4th
1962–63	Beta Ethniki	5th
1963–64	Beta Ethniki	1st
1964–65	Beta Ethniki	4th
1965–66	Beta Ethniki	8th
1966–67	Beta Ethniki	2nd
1967–68	Beta Ethniki	6th
1968–69	Beta Ethniki	1st
1969–70	Alpha Ethniki	18th
1970–71	Beta Ethniki	1st
1971–72	Alpha Ethniki	6th
1972–73	Alpha Ethniki	4th
1973–74	Alpha Ethniki	6th
1974–75	Alpha Ethniki	7th
1975–76	Alpha Ethniki	10th
1976–77	Alpha Ethniki	15th
1977–78	Alpha Ethniki	10th
1978–79	Alpha Ethniki	15th
1979–80	Alpha Ethniki	13th
1980–81	Alpha Ethniki	17th
1981–82	Beta Ethniki	1st
1982–83	Alpha Ethniki	16th
1983–84	Beta Ethniki	1st
1984–85	Alpha Ethniki	14th
1985–86	Alpha Ethniki	16th
1986–87	Beta Ethniki	1st
1987–88	Alpha Ethniki	16th
1988–89	Beta Ethniki	16th
1989–90	Beta Ethniki	2nd
1990–91	Alpha Ethniki	13th
1991–92	Alpha Ethniki	15th
1992–93	Alpha Ethniki	11th
1993–94	Alpha Ethniki	16th
1994–95	Beta Ethniki	2nd
1995–96	Alpha Ethniki	15th
1996–97	Alpha Ethniki	15th
1997–98	Alpha Ethniki	16th
1998–99	Beta Ethniki	2nd
1999–00	Alpha Ethniki	14th
2000–01	Alpha Ethniki	11th
2001–02	Alpha Ethniki	13th
2002–03	Alpha Ethniki	15th
2003–04	Beta Ethniki	16th
2004–05	Beta Ethniki	12th
2005–06	Beta Ethniki	15th
2006–07	Gamma Ethniki	10th
2007–08	Gamma Ethniki	5th
2008–09	Gamma Ethniki	3rd
2009–10	Gamma Ethniki	3rd
2010–11	Football League 2	1st
2011–12	Football League	4th
2012–13	Football League	15th
2013–14	Football League	6th
2014–15	Football League	6th*
2015–16	Football League	16th
2016–17	Gamma Ethniki	1st
2017–18	Football League	3rd
2018–19	Football League	5th
2019–20	Gamma Ethniki	8th
2020–21	Super League 2	7th
2021–22	Gamma Ethniki	1st
2022–23	Super League 2	12th
2023–24	Super League 2	10th
2024–25	Super League 2	10th
2025–26	Gamma Ethniki	9th

* Finished 2nd in the South Group and 6th in the promotion playoffs

=== Participation history ===
- First Division / Alpha Ethniki: 26 seasons
- Second Division / Beta Ethniki / Football League: 34 seasons
- Third Division / Football League 2: 10 seasons

== Players ==
=== Current squad ===
As of 27 July 2026

Note: Flags indicate national team as defined under FIFA eligibility rules; some limited exceptions apply. Players may hold more than one non-FIFA nationality.

No.	Pos.	Nation	Player
—	GK	GRE	Vasilios Soulis
—	GK	GRE	Theodoros Georgopoulos
—	GK	GRE	Argyris Krykidis
—	GK	GRE	Dimitris Sellas
—	DF	GRE	Dimitrios Patapis
—	DF	GRE	Charalampos Stathopoulos
—	DF	GRE	Charalampos Firinidis
—	DF	GRE	Vangelis Mantzas
—	DF	GRE	Lazaros Mavroudis
—	DF	GRE	Georgios Moustakopoulos
—	DF	GRE	Kostas Chnaris
—	MF	GRE	Christoforos Papaefthymiou
—	MF	GRE	Nikos Daramouskas

No.	Pos.	Nation	Player
—	MF	GRE	Stathis Vasiloudis
—	MF	GRE	Antonis Bourdos
—	MF	GRE	Athanasios Papatolios
—	MF	GRE	Athanasios Kostanasios
—	MF	GRE	Andreas Vasilogiannis
—	MF	GRE	Grigoris Niforopoulos
—	MF	GRE	Konstantinos Volakis
—	MF	GRE	Pavlos Karvounis
—	FW	PAK	Adil Nabi
—	FW	GRE	Nikolaos Ioannidis
—	FW	ALB	Amarildo Kaberaj

== Notable players ==
=== Greece ===
- (Greece) Kostas Andriopoulos
- (Greece) Georgios Amanatidis
- (Greece) Christos Apostolidis
- (Greece) Kostas Davourlis
- (Greece) Christos Eleftheriadis
- (Greece) Paris Georgakopoulos
- (Greece) Giorgos Kapouranis
- (Greece) Grigoris Georgatos
- (Greece) Takis Ikonomopoulos
- (Greece) Kostas Katsouranis
- (Greece) Leonidas Kyvelidis
- (Greece) Petros Leventakos
- (Greece) Andreas Michalopoulos
- (Greece) Manolis Pappas
- (Greece) Themis Rigas
- (Greece) Dimitris Spentzopoulos
- (Greece) Vassilis Stravopodis
- (Greece) Ilias Solakis
- (Greece) Panagiotis Gitsis
- (Greece) Michalis Lygnos
- (Greece) Nikos Loumpardeas
- (Greece) Konstantinos Foufoulas
- (Greece) (Albania) Andreas Tatos
- (Greece) Dimitrios Mavrias
- (Greece) Savvas Gentsoglou
- (Greece) Andreas Samaris
- (Greece) Kostas Kiassos
- (Greece) Konstantinos Chalkias
- (Greece) Vasilios Pliatsikas
- (Greece) Christos Aravidis

=== North & South America ===
- (Argentina) Fabián Caballero
- (Argentina) Sebastián Cobelli
- (Argentina) Luis Darío Calvo
- (Argentina) Fernando Ariel Brandán
- (Argentina) Nicolás Villafañe
- (Argentina) Israel Coll
- (Brazil) (Greece) Luciano de Souza
- (Brazil) Paulinho Kobayashi
- (Brazil) Márcio Ferreira
- (Brazil) Wanderson Miranda Francisco
- (Brazil) Aílton de Oliveira Modesto
- (Brazil) Giuliano Marinho dos Santos
- (Peru) Paul Cominges
- (United States) Andreas Chronis
- (Venezuela) Francisco Pol Hurtado
- (Haiti) Frantz Bertin
- (Mexico) Luis Madrigal

=== Africa ===
- (Tunisia) Bilel Mohsni
- (Cameroon) Nicolas Dikoume
- (Cameroon) Jean Didier Manga
- (Cameroon) Joël Epalle
- (Cameroon) Raymond Kalla
- (Cape Verde) José Emílio Furtado
- (Republic of the Congo) Junior Mapuku
- (Liberia) Olivier Makor
- (Liberia) Kelvin Sebwe
- (Nigeria) Amaechi Ottiji
- (Nigeria) Mustapha Itua
- (Guinea) Ousmane Pato
- (Guinea) Mohamed Keita
- (Ghana) Mark Asigba
- (Mozambique) Jerry Sitoe

=== Europe ===
- (Albania) Mario Gurma
- (Bulgaria) Hristo Telkiyski
- (Bosnia and Herzegovina) Mario Božić
- (Cyprus) Demetris Kizas
- (Cyprus) Nicos Panayiotou
- (Cyprus) Fotis Papoulis
- (Croatia) Ivan Djurdjek
- (Estonia) Martin Vunk
- (Denmark) Mikkel Bo Jensen
- (Hungary) Tóth Mihály
- (Germany) Walter Wagner
- (Montenegro) Nenad Vukčević
- (France) Franck Histilloles
- (Georgia (country)) Levan Kiriakidi
- (Poland) Krzysztof Nowak
- (Portugal) Jordão Diogo
- (Portugal) Filipe da Costa
- (Portugal) Miguel Pedro
- (Portugal) Miguel Lamego Tavares
- (Romania) Mihail Majearu
- (Russia) Valentin Zekhov
- (Slovakia) Mário Breška
- (Spain) Pol García
- (Spain) Javi Castellano
- (Serbia) Boško Mihajlović
- (Serbia) Dušan Jovanović
- (Sweden) Björn Enqvist
- (Ukraine) Vladyslav Sukhomlynov

=== Oceania ===
- (Australia) Peter Zorbas
- (Australia) Aaron Westervelt
- (Australia) Adriano Pellegrino

== Individual records ==
=== Player records ===
Panachaiki F.C. Top 10 All-Time Appearance Makers
Rank	Player	Nationality	Position	Appearances
1	Georgios Kyriakopoulos	Greece	Midfielder	204
2	Dimitrios Argyropoulos	Greece	Defender	168
3	Giannis Zerdevas	Greece	Defender	157
4	Theodoros Andriopoulos	Greece	Defender	150
5	Georgios Vaitsis	Greece	Forward	148
6	Dimitrios Genas	Greece	Defender	142
7	Panagiotis Kordonouris	Greece	Defender	116
8	Nenad Vukčević	Montenegro	Forward	115
9	Nikolaos Loumpardeas	Greece	Defender	112
10	Apostolos Drakopoulos	Greece	Forward	111

Panachaiki F.C. Top 10 All-Time Goalscorers
Rank	Player	Nationality	Goals	Appearances	Ratio
1	Amaechi Ottiji	Nigeria	45	103	0.44
2	Georgios Vaitsis	Greece	33	148	0.22
3	Nenad Vukčević	Montenegro	32	115	0.28
4	Igor Klejch	Slovakia	27	103	0.26
5	Vasilios Chardalias	Greece	26	63	0.41
6	Panagiotis Moraitis	Greece	25	72	0.35
7	Furtado	Cape Verde	22	36	0.61
8	Christos Eleftheriadis	Greece	22	78	0.28
9	Ilias Solakis	Greece	21	70	0.30
10	Apostolos Drakopoulos	Greece	19	111	0.17

== Ownership ==
=== Current Ownership (2026–present) ===
==== Southwest Holding & Işıtan Gün ====
In June 2026, the majority shareholding package of Panachaiki F.C. was acquired by the investment firm Southwest Holding, led by Turkish businessman Işıtan Gün, opening a brand-new chapter in the club's ownership history.

== Administrative history ==
Panachaiki was transformed into a Football Public Limited Company (PAE) in 1979, following the establishment of professional football in Greece. Since then, the ownership and management of the club have gone through several historical phases:

=== Aris Loukopoulos Era (1979–2003) ===
Aris Loukopoulos was the longest-serving and most iconic administrative leader in the history of professional Panachaiki, taking the reins in 1979.

- On-field presence: Under his leadership, the club maintained a stable presence in the Alpha Ethniki (First Division) and reached the semi-finals of the Greek Cup in 1997.
- End of an era: His long tenure was marked by intense friction with organized fans, allegations regarding football background politics, and mounting financial issues that ultimately led to his departure in 2003.

=== Financial Crisis, Relegation, and Stathis Moutzouroulias (2003–2005) ===
In 2003, Panachaiki faced severe financial distress and was expelled from the Beta Ethniki (Second Division) due to debts. Businessman Stathis Moutzouroulias took over management and executed a merger with Patraikos F.C., temporarily forming "PAS Panachaiki" so the club could regain its spot in the professional Second Division.

=== Kostas Makris Era (2005–2009) ===
In 2005, the majority stake of the shares was acquired by the Greek-Australian businessman Kostas Makris.

- Makris invested significant funds into the club's roster and infrastructure.
- In 2008, he hired the later highly successful manager Ange Postecoglou as the head coach.
- Despite heavy spending, the team failed to secure promotion back to the top tier, leading to Makris's departure in May 2009.

=== Alexis Kougias Era (2009–2015) ===
The well-known criminal defense lawyer Alexis Kougias acquired the shares of the club in 2009. His six-year tenure was characterized by intense public disputes, frequent managerial changes, and ongoing efforts to clean up the club's finances before he stepped down in 2015.

=== Panachaiki Symmachia & Kostas Katsouranis (2016–2019) ===
Following a period of administrative uncertainty and voluntary relegation to the Gamma Ethniki (Third Division), a group of local businessmen formed the "Panachaiki Symmachia" (Panachaiki Alliance). They led the club's rebirth project, appointing Euro 2004 winner Kostas Katsouranis as technical director and the public face of the football department.

=== Giorgos Barlos (2020–2021) ===
Patras-based businessman Giorgos Barlos took over the shares during a critical financial juncture. Despite his efforts to stabilize the club, pre-existing financial burdens remained overwhelming, prompting a renewed search for external investors.

=== American Investment Fund & Petros Stathakis (2021–2026) ===
In 2021, the club passed into the hands of a group of American investors (including Jared Weiss, Ashton Bailey, Brandon Bailey, and Joseph Kobzan). Petros Stathakis served as the primary representative and administrative leader on the ground in Greece, guiding the club back to the professional divisions.
