= Wilbert Suvrijn =

Dutch former professional footballer (born 1962)

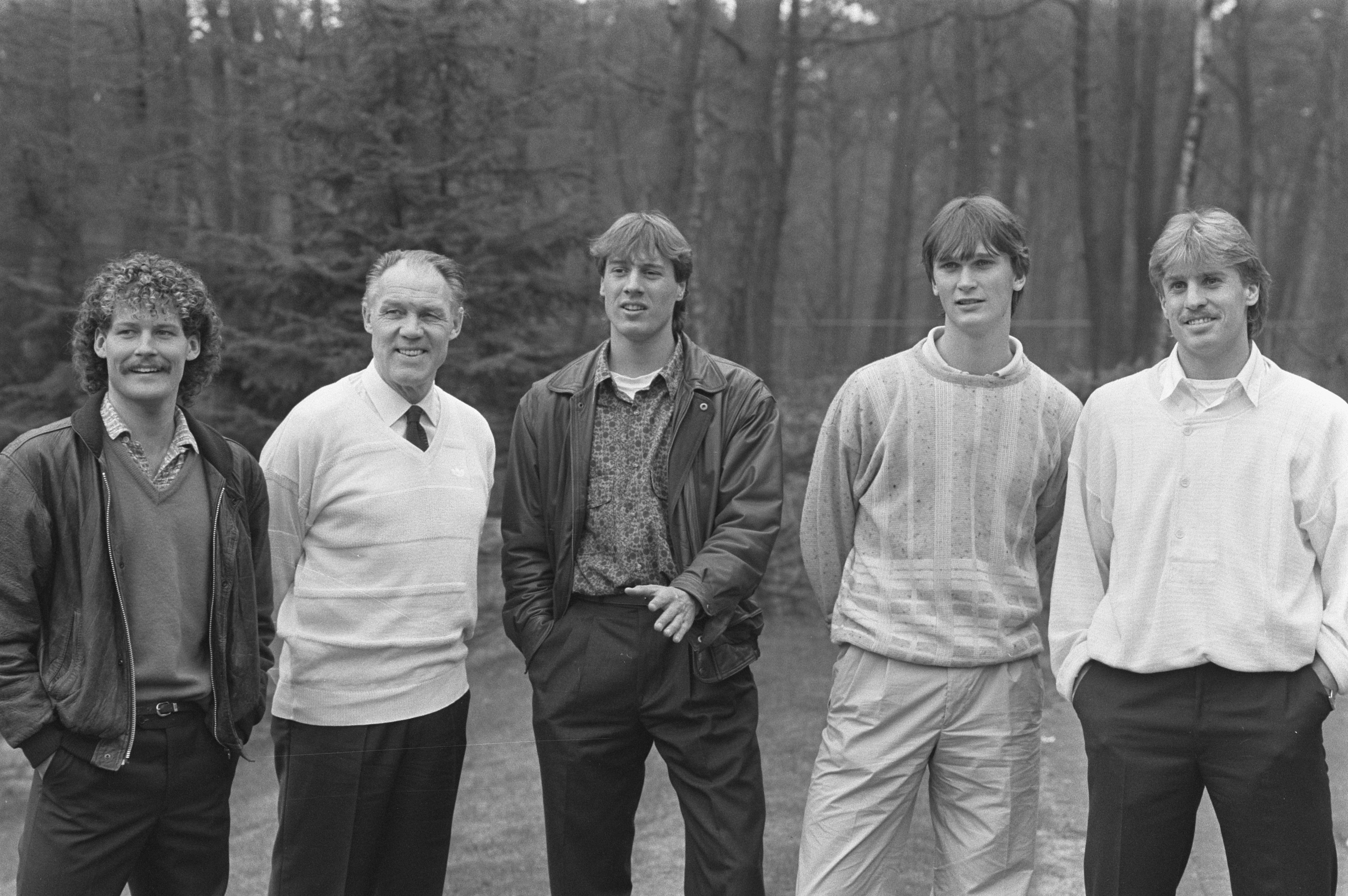
- Suvrijn (far right) in 1986, together with Danny Blind, coach Rinus Michels, John van 't Schip, and John Bosman

Personal information
- Date of birth: 26 October 1962 (age 64)
- Place of birth: Sittard, Netherlands
- Height: 1.86 m (6 ft 1 in)
- Position: Centre back

Youth career
- Almania

Senior career*
Years	Team	Apps	(Gls)
1981–1986	Fortuna Sittard	156	(10)
1986–1989	Roda	82	(3)
1989–1993	Montpellier	103	(1)
Total		341	(14)

International career
1986–1988	Netherlands	9	(0)
Medal record
Representing Netherlands
UEFA European Championship
Winner	1988 West Germany
- * Club domestic league appearances and goals

Wilbert Suvrijn (born 26 October 1962) is a Dutch former professional footballer. Mainly a central defender, he could also operate as a defensive midfielder.

== Club career ==
Suvrijn was born in Sittard, Limburg. In his country, he represented hometown's Fortuna Sittard (winning promotion to the Eredivisie in his debut season, as champions) and Roda JC, playing in a total of 209 games in the top division over the course of seven seasons. With the latter club, he scored twice in 31 matches in 1986–87, helping it finish fourth and qualify for the UEFA Cup.

In 1989, Suvrijn signed with French side Montpellier HSC, helping them win the domestic cup in his first year – he missed the final due to injury – and contributing decisively to the team's sixth place in Ligue 1 in 1991–92, playing almost exclusively in midfield. After only nine matches in the following campaign, mainly due to back problems, the 30-year-old decided to retire, staying closely related to France, and became a players agent.

== International career ==
Suvrijn made his debut for the Netherlands on 29 April 1986, coming on as a substitute for Michel Valke in a friendly with Scotland (0–0) as Rinus Michels was the manager. He went on to earn nine full caps in two years, being called to the squad for UEFA Euro 1988 in West Germany.

Suvrijn appeared in two games for the eventual champions in the UEFA Euro 1988 tournament, totalling four minutes. In the group stage 3–1 win over England, he replaced Marco van Basten, scorer of all of the team's goals in the match. In the semi-finals against the hosts (2–1), he played the last minute in the place of injured Erwin Koeman.

== Career statistics ==
=== International ===
Appearances and goals by national team and year
National team	Year	Apps	Goals
Netherlands	1986	4	0
Netherlands	1987	1	0
Netherlands	1988	4	0
Total		9	0

== Honours ==
=== Player ===
Montpellier

- Coupe de la Ligue: 1991–92
