= Jan Notermans =

Dutch footballer and manager

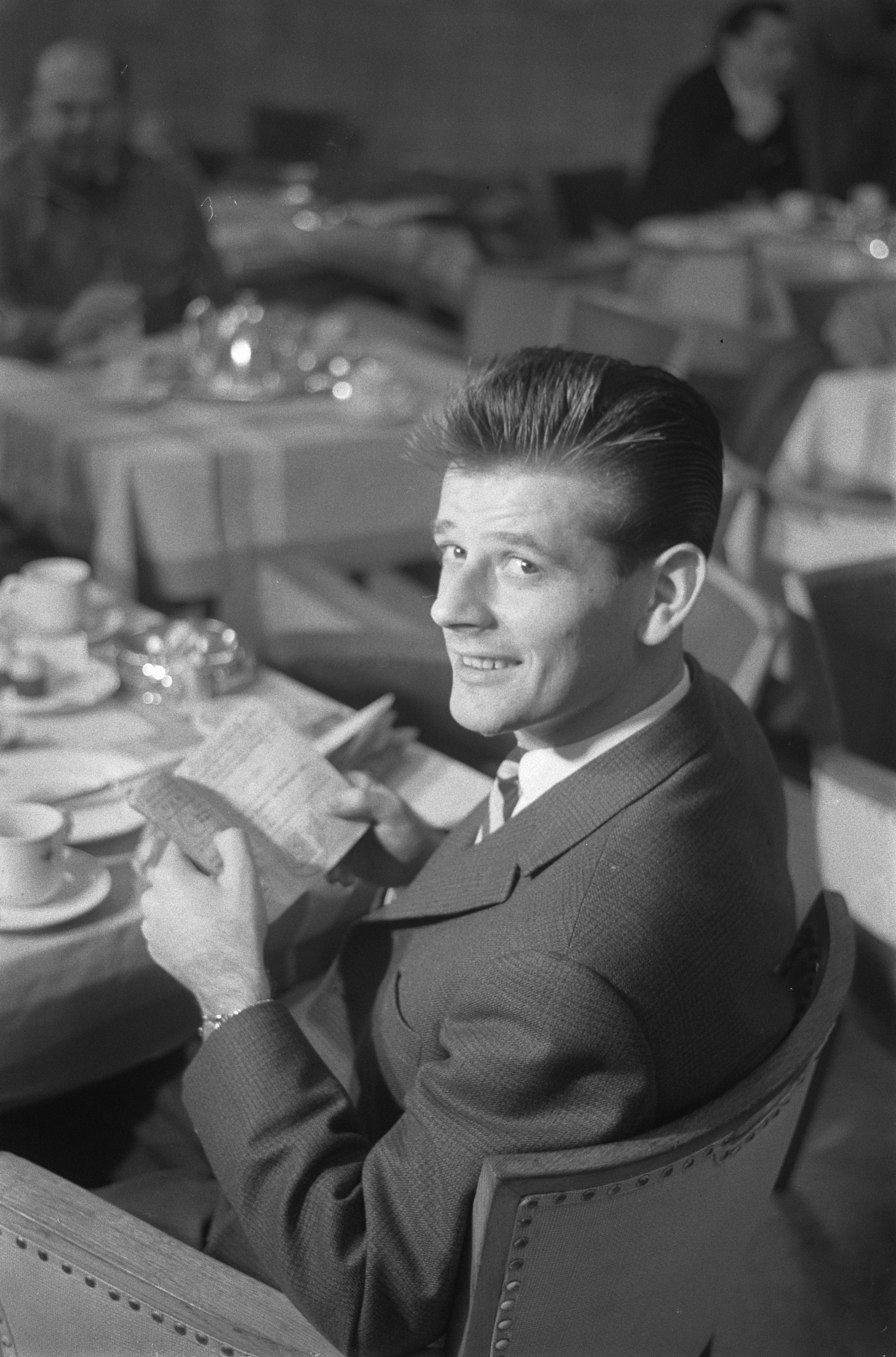
- Notermans in 1960

Personal information
- Full name: Jan Martin Gerardus Notermans
- Date of birth: 29 July 1932
- Place of birth: Sittard, Netherlands
- Date of death: 8 June 2017 (aged 84)
- Place of death: Sittard, Netherlands
- Position: Midfielder

Senior career*
Years	Team	Apps	(Gls)
1955–1964	Fortuna '54		
1964–1965	Sittardia		

International career
1956–1960	Netherlands	25	(2)

Managerial career
- 1968–1969: SVN Sittard
- 1969: Rios
- 1971–1972: Arminia Hannover
- 1972: Arminia Bielefeld
- 1973–1975: Go Ahead Eagles
- 1976–1977: FC Groningen
- 1977: AZ
- 1979–1983: Helmond Sport
- 1984–1985: Willem II
- * Club domestic league appearances and goals

Jan Martin Gerardus Notermans (29 July 1932 – 8 June 2017) was a Dutch football player and manager.

He played for Fortuna '54 and Sittardia. He capped 25 times for Netherlands.

He coached Arminia Bielefeld, Go Ahead Eagles, FC Groningen, AZ, Helmond Sport and Willem II.

== Honours ==
=== Player ===
Fortuna 54

- KNVB Cup: 1956–57, 1963–64
- Eredivisie runner-up: 1956–57

Sittardia

- Eerste Divisie: 1965–66

=== Manager ===
Helmond Sport

- Eerste Divisie: 1981–82
