= Sittard =

City in Limburg, Netherlands

Coordinates: 51°00′N 5°52′E

Sittard Zitterd
- City
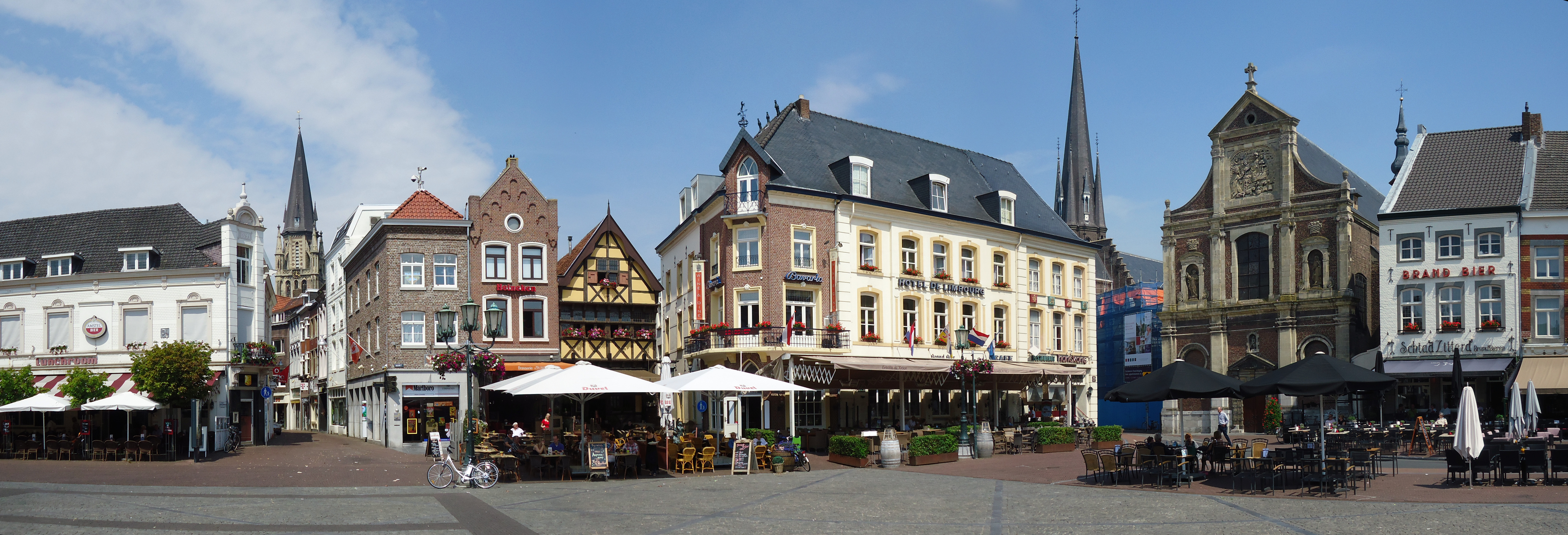
- The Markt (market square) of Sittard

- Flag Coat of arms

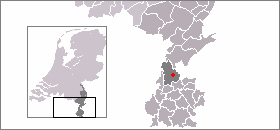
- Country: Netherlands
- Province: Limburg
- COROP: South Limburg
- Municipality: Sittard-Geleen

Population (2026)
  - Total: 37,645
- Postal code: 6130-6137
- Dialling code: 046
- Major roads: N276, N294, N297

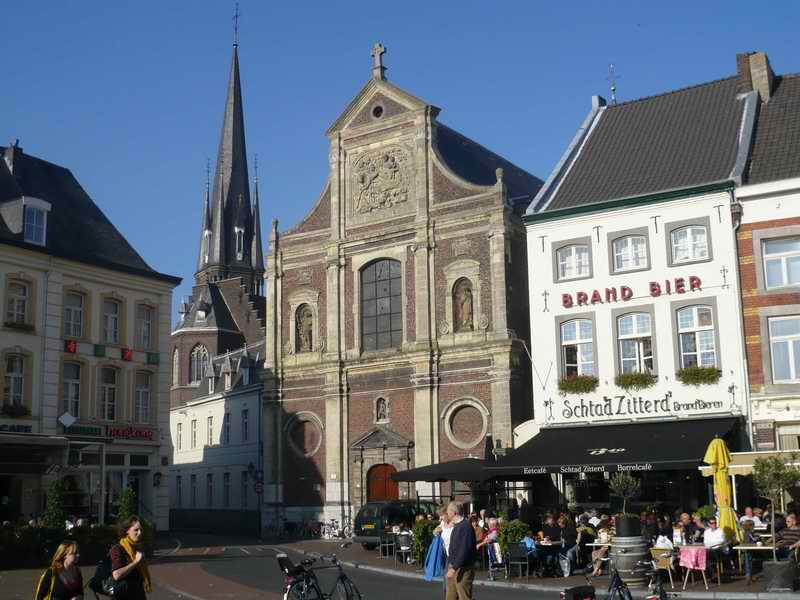
St Michael's Church on Sittard's market square.

Sittard (Dutch pronunciation: [ˈsɪtɑrt]; Limburgish: Zitterd [ˈzɪtəʀt]) is a city in the Netherlands, situated in the southernmost province of Limburg.

The town is part of the municipality of Sittard-Geleen and has almost 37,500 inhabitants in 2016.

In its east, Sittard borders the German municipality of Selfkant (in the state of North Rhine-Westphalia).

The city centre is located at 45 m above sea level.

== History ==
Archaeological discoveries have dated the first settlement in the Sittard area around 5000 B.C. Present day Sittard is assumed to have been founded around 850 A.D. and to have been built around a motte. Sittard was first mentioned in 1157. It was granted city rights by the Duke of Limburg in 1243. In 1400 it was sold to the Duchy of Jülich, and remained in its possession until 1794. The city was destroyed and rebuilt repeatedly, due to fires and various conflicts during the 15th-17th century. It was a stronghold until it was largely destroyed in 1677, during the Franco-Dutch War. Under French occupation (1794-1814), Sittard was part of the Roer department. Since 1814, it has been part of the Netherlands, except for the years 1830–1839, when it joined the Belgian Revolution. During the Second World War, it was occupied by the Germans, who incorporated several small municipalities, like Broeksittard, into Sittard. The city was liberated September 18–19, 1944 by the 2nd Armored Division. The historic town was mostly spared destruction, despite lying in the frontline for over four months, in which over 4000 shells and rockets struck the city.

After World War II, Sittard expanded rapidly and many new neighbourhoods were built. The coal mines in the region were the driving force of a booming economy, until closed in the 1960s and 70s. It now has large industrial zones and office premises.

== Main sights ==
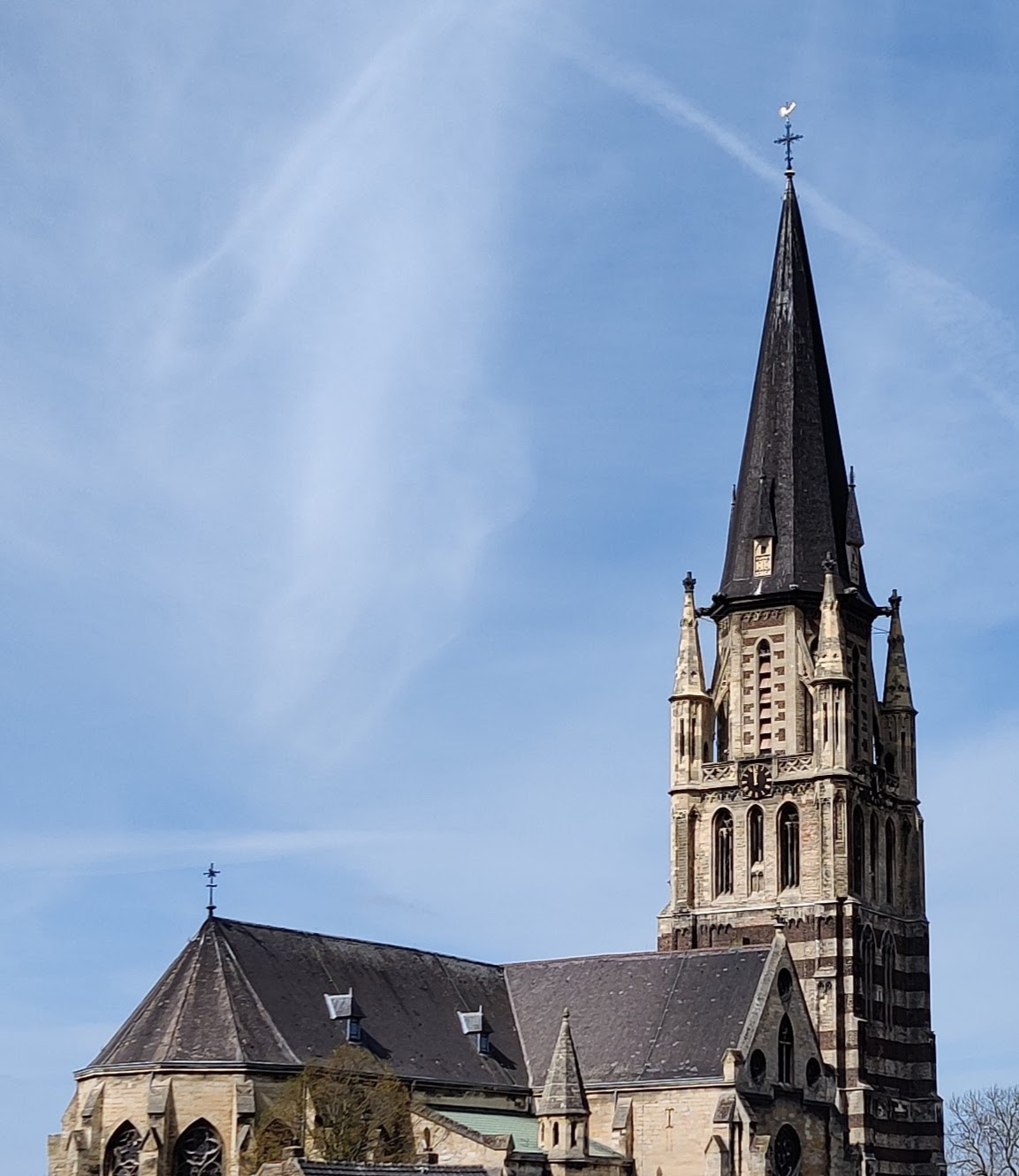
St Peter's church.

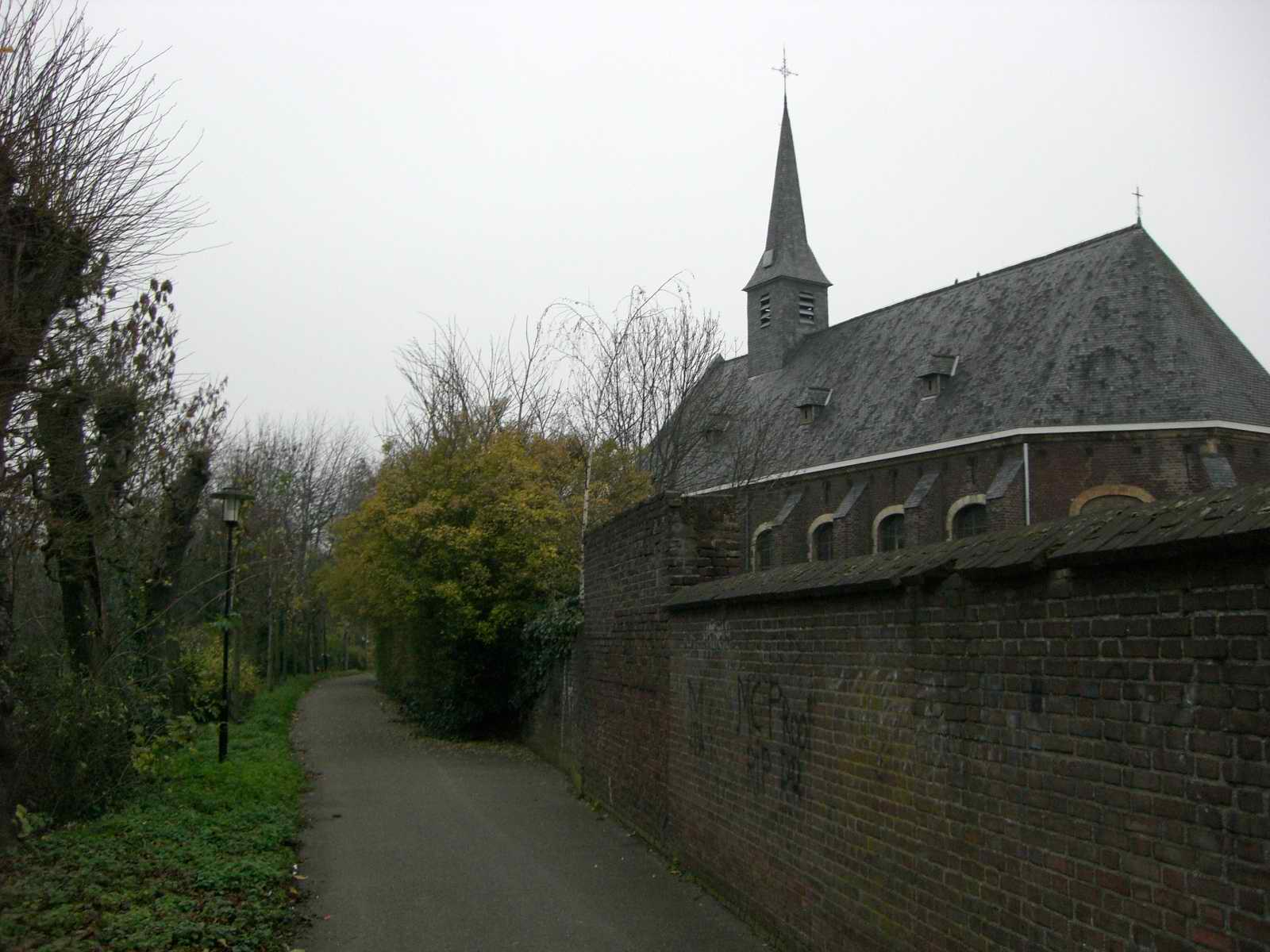
City wall and nunnery St.-Agnetenberg.

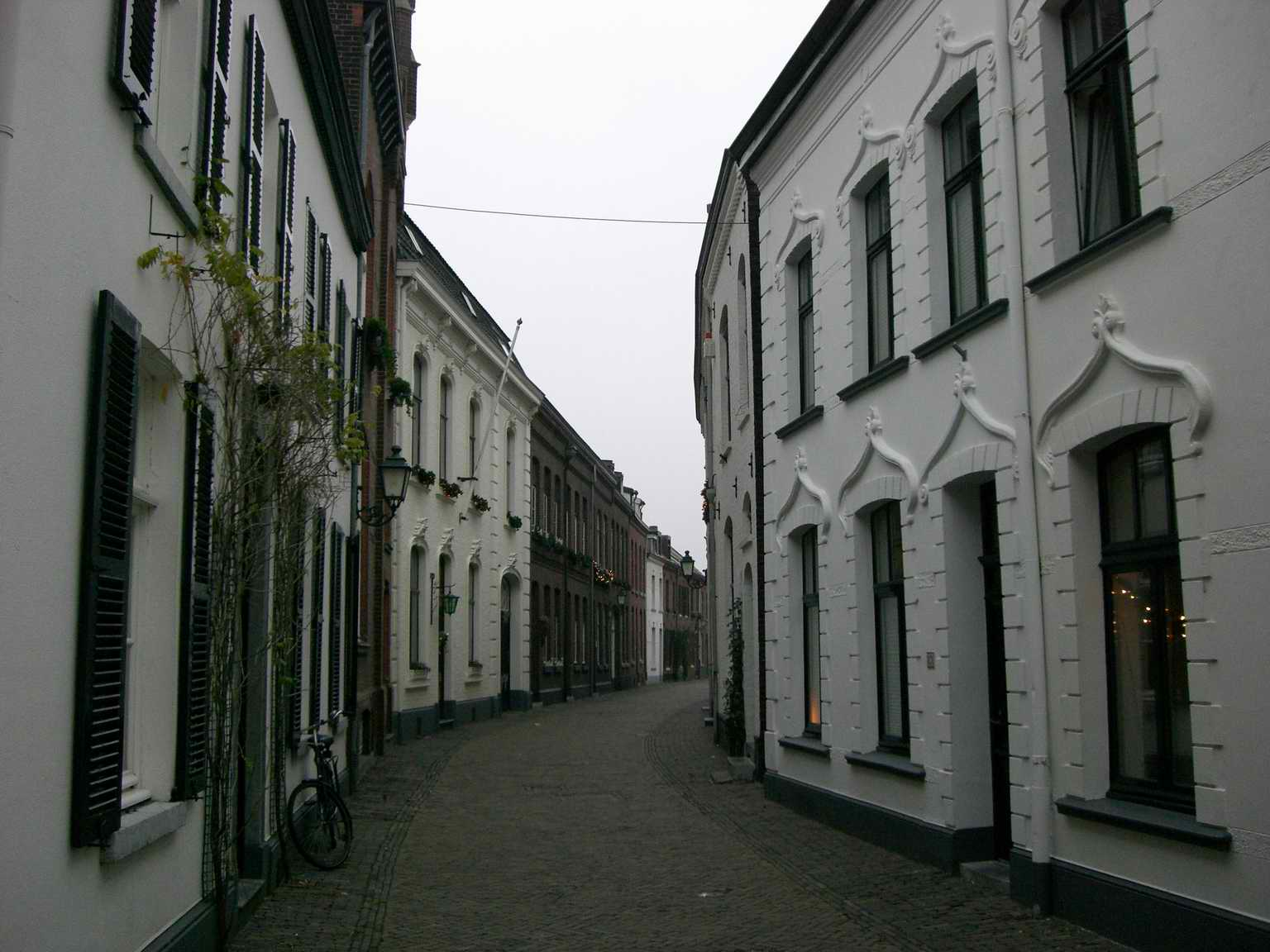
Stylish buildings of a street in the ancient city centre.

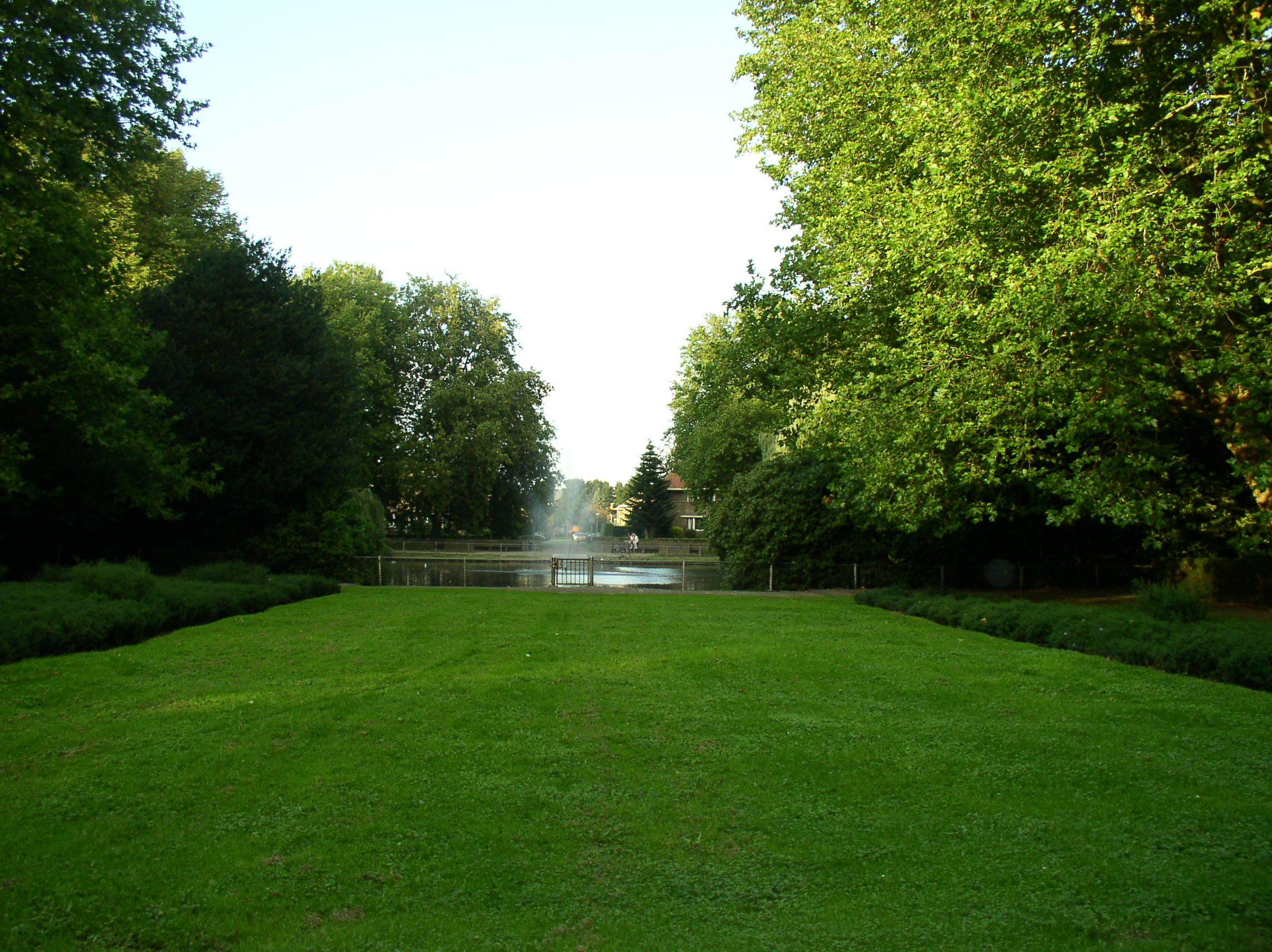
The city park.

Sittard has a small historic city centre with numerous architectural monuments, including several old churches, monasteries and a few half-timbered houses. The city centre is a protected area (beschermd stadsbezicht).

The most important monuments are:

- St Peter's Church, 14th-16th century, Gothic style. The 16th-century tower received its current steeple in 1875.
- Dominican monastery, 17th century, with the Baroque St Michael's Church
- Dominican nunnery St.-Agnetenberg, 17th century
- Reformed Church, 17th century
- Ursulines nunnery and boarding school, 16th-19th century
- Basilica of Our Lady of the Sacred Heart (1875–77) and Mariapark (1891), pilgrimage sites
- The medieval city wall
- Half-timbered houses, 16th-17th century
- The Jacob Kritzraedt house, 17th century, Mannerist style
- Watermills, 16th-17th century
- City park, 1921–27

The central market square has many restaurants and bars. The city has retained part of its city wall. On the south-eastern side of the city centre, the St Rosa chapel crowns the Kollenberg hill. Museum "Het Nieuwe Domein" is situated in a converted nineteenth century school building in the city centre. It focuses on contemporary art, urban history and archaeology. There is also a Commonwealth War Cemetery, where 239 soldiers of the Commonwealth Nations lie buried. Among them Dennis Donnini, the youngest to have received the Victoria Cross in World War II.

== Economy ==
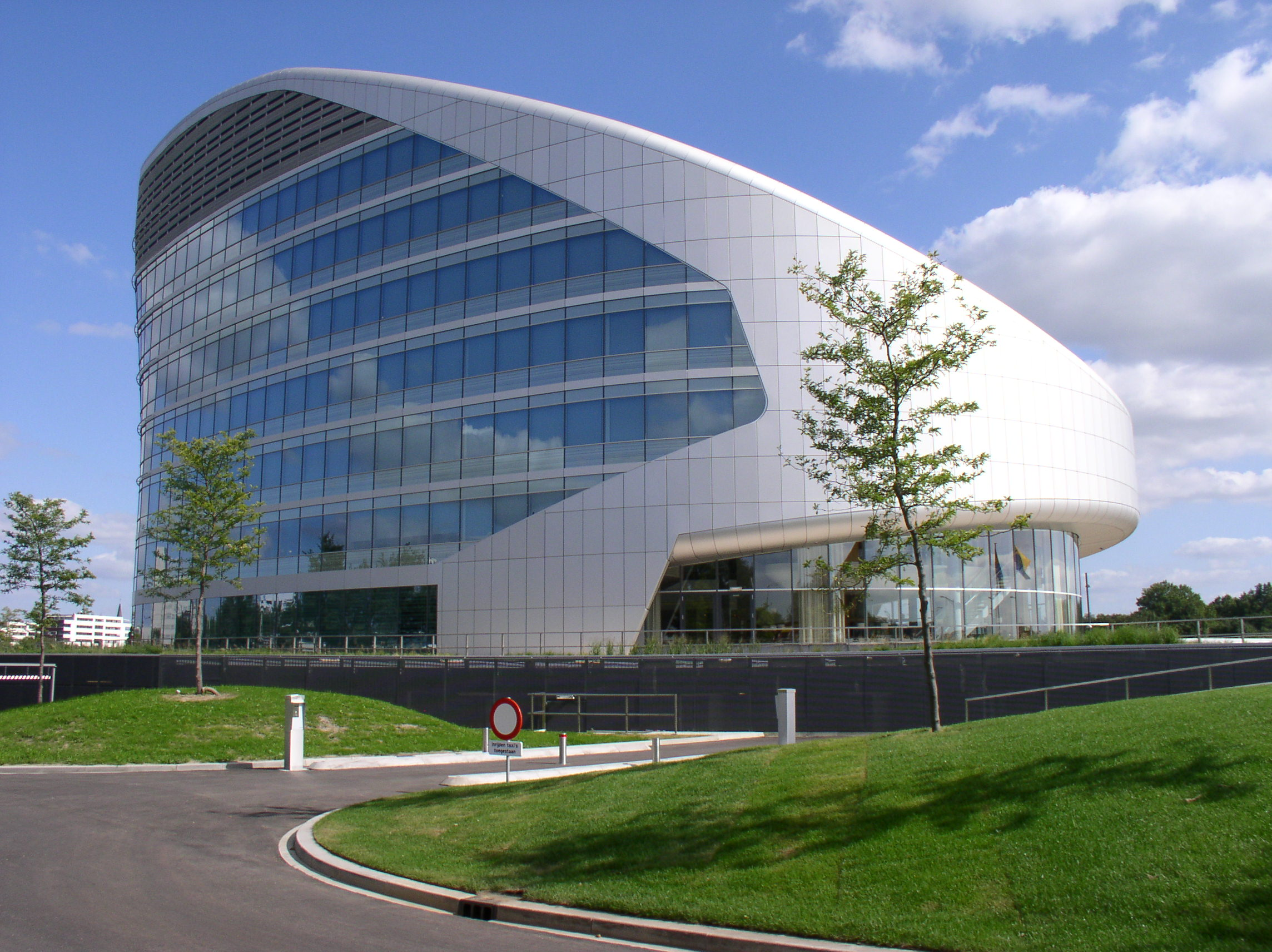
SABIC European head office.

Sittard houses the SABIC European head office and a large DSM office; both companies having large chemical production facilities in nearby Geleen. The head office of the plant hire company Boels Rental is also located in Sittard.

== Education ==
There are several schools for higher vocational education and training (hbo) in the city, including faculties of the Hogeschool Zuyd and Fontys Hogescholen. Large schools for secondary education in Sittard are 'Trevianum Scholengroep' (havo and vwo) and 'Da Capo College' (vmbo).

== Sports ==
Sittard is the home of the professional football club Fortuna Sittard and of the handball club Sittardia.

The biggest Kennedy march of the Netherlands starts and ends in Sittard.

== Notable people ==
- Charles Beltjens, poet
- Eddy Beugels, cyclist
- Rens Blom, athlete competing in pole vault
- Harry Brüll, professional football player
- Mike van Diem, film director
- Willy Dullens, professional football player
- Gerard Gruisen, professional football player
- Toon Hermans, comedian
- Frederic Adolph Hoefer, lieutenant-general
- Wim Hof, The Iceman, motivational speaker and extreme athlete
- Germ Hofma, professional football player
- Leo Horn, football referee
- Francine Houben, architect, director of Mecanoo
- Willy Janssen, professional football player
- Jan Krekels, cyclist, Olympic champion
- Danny Nelissen, cyclist
- Jan Nolten, cyclist
- Jan Notermans, professional football player
- Rineke Dijkstra, photographer
- Huub Stevens, professional football player and manager
- Wilbert Suvrijn, professional football player
- Arnold Vanderlyde, boxer
- Joost Zweegers, singer and pianist of Novastar
- Laurence Stassen, VNL politician

== Dialect ==
The Sittard dialect is a particular variant of Limburgish.

== Sister cities ==
- Valjevo, Serbia.
- Hasselt, Belgium

== See also ==
- Vansittart, surname derived from the city.
