= Willy Dullens =

Dutch footballer (1945–2024)

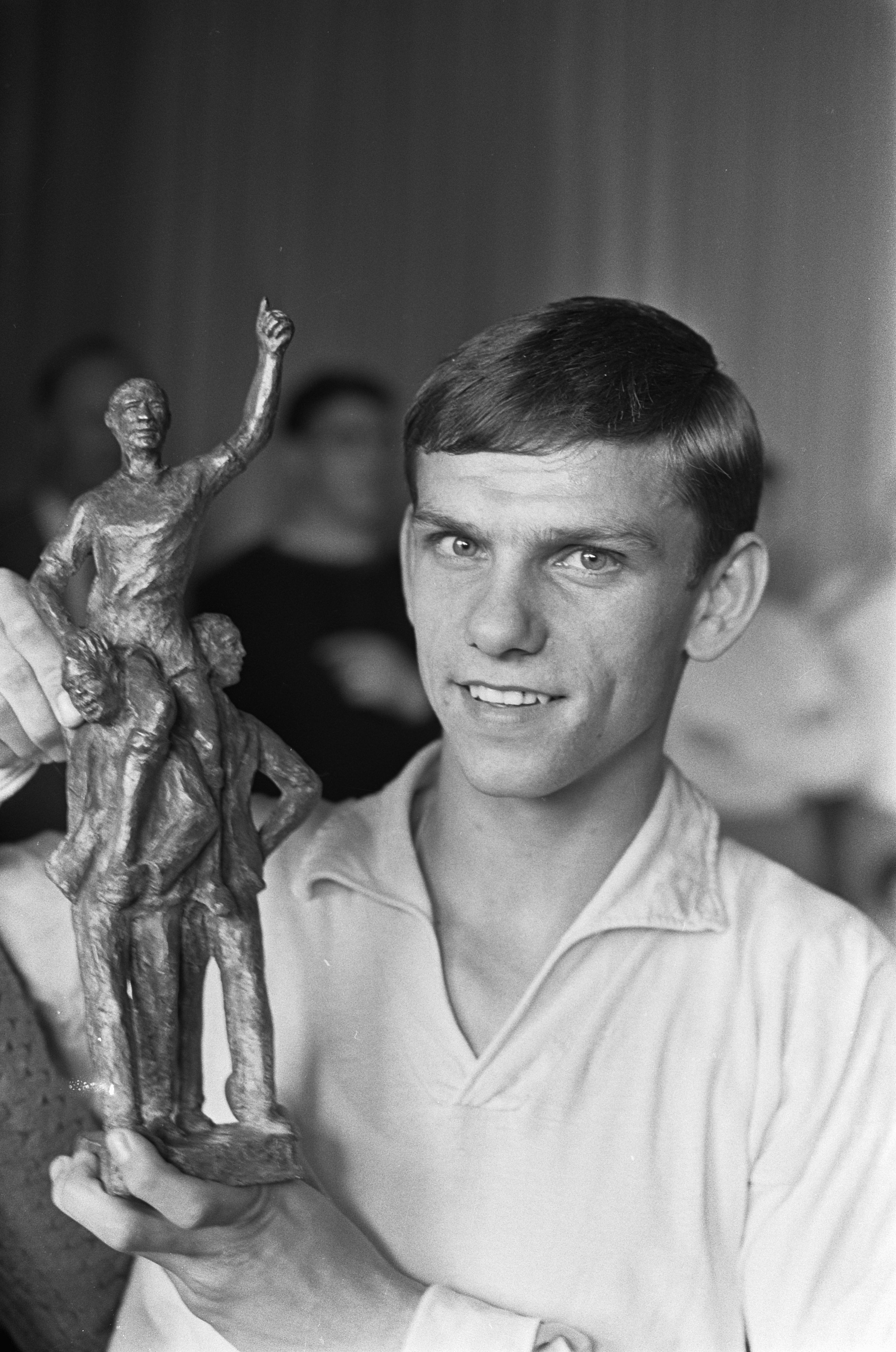
- Dullens in 1966

Personal information
- Full name: Wilhelmus Maria Dullens
- Date of birth: 29 January 1945
- Place of birth: Urmond, Netherlands
- Date of death: 16 June 2024 (aged 79)
- Place of death: Sittard, Netherlands
- Height: 1.69 m (5 ft 7 in)
- Position: Forward

Youth career
- Almania

Senior career*
Years	Team	Apps	(Gls)
1963–1968	Sittardia	104	(32)
1968–1969	Fortuna Sittard	14	(1)

International career
1966	Netherlands	4	(0)
- * Club domestic league appearances and goals

Willy Dullens (29 January 1945 – 16 June 2024) was a Dutch footballer who played for Sittardia and the Netherlands national team but his career was cut short due to a knee injury. In 1966, uniquely while playing in the Eerste Divisie, he was chosen as the Dutch Footballer of the Year.

Dullens and Johan Cruijff were seen as the biggest talents of Dutch football in the 1960's. Cruijff said that Dullens was more skilled than him. After Dullens was forced to retire, Cruijff and Sjaak Swart organised a charity match for him. The match, between AFC Ajax and Alemannia Aachen at the Olympic Stadium in Amsterdam, was attended by 60,000 spectators.

== International career ==
Dullens played four matches for the Dutch national team, all in 1966. He made his debut in a 3-1 victory over Belgium. He also played in a 3-0 victory over Scotland and in a 1-2 loss to Czechoslovakia, both friendly matches. Dullens earned his final cap in November 1966, a Euro 1968 qualifying match against Denmark (2-0 victory).

== Personal life ==
After retiring Dullens opened a salon.

=== Death ===
Dullens was diagnosed with Alzheimer's disease in 2021. He died on 16 June 2024, at the age of 79.
