= Dimitrios Patapis =

Greek footballer

Personal information
- Date of birth: 14 June 1996 (age 30)
- Place of birth: Patras, Greece
- Height: 1.80 m (5 ft 11 in)
- Position: Centre-back

Youth career
- 2010–2011: Doxa Paralias
- 2011–2013: AO Patrai 2008

Senior career*
Years	Team	Apps	(Gls)
2013–2015	AO Patrai 2008	50	(14)
2015–2016	Keravnos Agiou Vasiliou	23	(4)
2016–2021	Panachaiki	34	(0)
2016–2017	→ PAO Varda (loan)	14	(0)
2017–2018	→ Achaiki (loan)	21	(0)
2021–2022	Chania	30	(0)
2022–2023	Apollon Smyrnis	22	(0)
2023–2024	Gloria Buzău	9	(0)
2024–2025	Ilioupolis	21	(0)
2025–2026	Pyrgos	9	(1)
2026–	Panachaiki	0	(0)
- * Club domestic league appearances and goals as of 1 July 2025

Dimitrios Patapis (Greek: Δημήτριος Πατάπης; born 14 June 1996) is a Greek professional footballer who plays as a centre-back.
