= Fortuna Sittard =

Association football club in the Netherlands

- Full name: Fortuna Sittard
- Nicknames: Fortuna; Fortunezen; FSC; Fortuna Zitterd
- Founded: 1 July 1968; 58 years ago
- Ground: Fortuna Sittard Stadion
- Capacity: 12,500
- Owner(s): Principion Holding 20% Özgür Işıtan Gün 65% Fortuna Sittard 10% STAK 5%
- Chairman: Jos van de Mortel
- Head coach: Danny Buijs
- League: Eredivisie
- 2025–26: Eredivisie, 11th of 18
- Website: www.fortunasittard.nl

Fortuna Sittard is a Dutch professional football club based in Sittard, in the municipality of Sittard-Geleen, Limburg. The club emerged in 1968 from the merger of Fortuna ’54 and Sittardia, a necessary merger prompted by the financial difficulties and impending bankruptcy of both clubs, in order to preserve professional football in the region. Through Fortuna ’54, Fortuna Sittard traces its roots to the pioneers of professional football in the Netherlands, as Fortuna ’54 are the founders of Dutch professional football and was the first professional football club in Dutch football history. The club plays its home matches at the Fortuna Sittard Stadion in Sittard and competes in the Eredivisie, the highest level of Dutch football.

== History ==
=== The origins of professional football in the Netherlands ===
1954

On 1 June 1954, businessman Gied Joosten founded Fortuna ’54 in Geleen. At a time when the Royal Dutch Football Association (KNVB) officially opposed professional football, Joosten began paying players to play for Fortuna ’54. The club has founded professional football in the Netherlands and became the first professional football club in the Netherlands and played in the newly established Nederlandse Beroepsvoetbalbond (NBVB), a rival football association to the KNVB. The initiative of Fortuna ’54 and the NBVB played a major role in forcing the establishment of professional football in the Netherlands. In November 1954, the NBVB and KNVB reached an agreement and merged their competitions, formally establishing professional football within the Dutch football structure.

Fortuna ’54 quickly attracted some of the leading Dutch players of the era, including Frans de Munck, Cor van der Hart, Bram Appel, Faas Wilkes and Bart Carlier. The club developed a reputation as a pioneering and ambitious side and became one of the most prominent teams in the early years of Dutch professional football.

=== The golden era of Fortuna ’54 ===
The 1950s were the most celebrated period in the history of Fortuna ’54. The club played a large number of international exhibition matches against major European and South American clubs. Opponents included Real Madrid, Bayern Munich, Chelsea F.C., Tottenham Hotspur, Botafogo and Boca Juniors. Fortuna ’54 became known internationally for its ambitious style and its collection of prominent players.

One of the most famous matches was played against Brazilian side Botafogo in Geleen in 1959. Botafogo featured legendary Brazilian forward Garrincha, and Fortuna ‘54 lost the match 3–4. Fortuna also played against Real Madrid during this period, including a match at the Santiago Bernabéu Stadium. The club’s international programme was remarkable for a Dutch team of its era and contributed to its reputation as one of the pioneers of Dutch football.

In the 1956–57 season, Fortuna ’54 finished second in the national competition behind Ajax and won its first KNVB Beker, defeating Feyenoord 4–2 in the final. Fortuna ’54 won the KNVB Beker for a second time in 1964, defeating ADO after a penalty shoot-out.

Despite its strong squad and international reputation, Fortuna ’54 never won the Dutch national championship. Its extensive programme of international exhibition matches was also considered one of the reasons why the club did not achieve greater success in the league.

=== Decline and merger ===
During the 1960s, Fortuna ‘54’s sporting and financial position deteriorated. The financial problems became increasingly serious following the decline and eventual bankruptcy of its major sponsor Vascomij. Fortuna ’54 was relegated from the top flight in 1968. In the same year, it merged with neighbouring Sittardia, which had also been relegated, in an attempt to create a financially viable professional club in the Sittard-Geleen region.

1968

On 1 July 1968, the new club was established as Fortuna Sittardia Combinatie (FSC). The club initially played its matches in both Sittard and Geleen. Geleen no longer wanted to accommodate Fortuna and the club no longer received support from the then municipality of Geleen. As a result, Fortuna moved to Sittard, and the name was later incorporated into Fortuna Sittard in 1979. De Baandert in Sittard became its permanent home. FSC soon returned to the second tier, where it would spend much of the following decade.

=== Return to the Eredivisie ===
The club’s first major breakthrough after the merger came in 1982. Fortuna Sittard finished second in the Eerste Divisie and secured promotion to the Eredivisie after defeating Heracles Almelo 3–1 on 16 May 1982. The club subsequently spent eleven seasons in the top division.

Fortuna enjoyed one of its strongest periods during the 1980s. In 1984, the club reached the KNVB Beker final against Feyenoord but lost 1–0. The result nevertheless earned Fortuna a place in the UEFA Cup Winners’ Cup for the following season.

=== European football ===
Fortuna Sittard’s European campaign in the 1984–85 season remains one of the most significant international periods in the club’s history. Fortuna defeated FC Copenhagen in the first round of the European Cup Winners’ Cup and then eliminated Wisła Kraków in the second round. This earned the club a quarter-final against English side Everton F.C., one of the leading teams in European football at the time.

Fortuna lost the tie to Everton, but reaching the quarter-finals of a European competition represented one of the greatest achievements in the club’s history. The campaign also generated some of the largest attendances in the history of De Baandert.

=== The 1990s ===
After several successful seasons in the Eredivisie, Fortuna’s league performances declined and the club was relegated in 1993. The stay in the Eerste Divisie lasted only two seasons. In 1994–95, under manager Pim Verbeek, Fortuna won the Eerste Divisie and returned to the Eredivisie. The title was achieved with a relatively young squad, with several players from the club’s youth system becoming important to the team.

The 1990s also produced a new generation of prominent Fortuna players, including Mark van Bommel, Kevin Hofland and Fernando Ricksen, all of whom later played for the Netherlands national football team.

Under manager Bert van Marwijk, Fortuna reached the KNVB Beker final again in the 1998–99 season. After defeating PSV Eindhoven 3–1 in the semi-final in Eindhoven, Fortuna reached the final against AFC Ajax. Ajax won the final 2–0.

=== The move to the new stadium ===
In 1999, Fortuna Sittard left its historic home at Stadion De Baandert after 35 years. The club had decided that the stadium no longer met modern requirements and that a complete renovation would be too expensive. A new stadium was therefore built on the outskirts of Sittard, at the newly developing business park along the Bergerweg. The new stadium, which cost approximately 30–33 million Dutch guilders, was intended to provide Fortuna with modern facilities and a new future.

The final match at De Baandert was played on 23 October 1999 against Sparta Rotterdam. Fortuna won 3–2, bringing an end to an era that had begun with Sittardia’s move to the stadium in 1964. The new stadium was opened in November 1999 with a friendly match against FC Schalke 04, which ended in a 1–1 draw.

However, the move marked the beginning of a difficult period for Fortuna Sittard. The club’s sporting performances declined rapidly in the following seasons, while the financial burden associated with the new stadium became increasingly problematic. Fortuna were relegated from the Eredivisie in 2002, and by then the club was facing severe financial difficulties and mounting debts. The large investment in the new stadium, together with declining revenues and sporting setbacks, placed increasing pressure on the club’s future.

The contrast with the final years at De Baandert was striking. Fortuna had reached the KNVB Beker final in 1999 and possessed a talented generation of players, but the move to the new stadium was followed by a prolonged decline. What had initially been presented as the beginning of a new era instead became the starting point of one of the most difficult periods in the club’s history.

=== Decline and financial difficulties ===
The beginning of the 2000s marked another difficult period. Fortuna were relegated from the Eredivisie in 2002, after which the club experienced serious sporting and financial problems. In 2009, Fortuna temporarily lost its professional licence, although the decision was subsequently overturned by a civil court. Supporters played an important role in helping the club survive its financial difficulties and reduce its debts.

For more than a decade, Fortuna remained outside the Eredivisie. The club continued to struggle financially and experienced several changes in ownership and management. The situation became particularly serious during the 2015–16 period, when supporters helped raise funds to prevent the club from facing collapse.

=== Return to the Eredivisie in 2018 ===
In 2016, Turkish businessman Işıtan Gün became the club’s majority shareholder and began a restructuring of Fortuna Sittard. The club subsequently rebuilt its sporting and financial organisation.

The 2017–18 season produced one of the most unusual promotions in Dutch football history. Fortuna Sittard finished second in the Eerste Divisie, behind Jong Ajax. At the time, second place did not normally provide direct promotion. However, Jong Ajax were ineligible for promotion because they were a reserve team of AFC Ajax and could not play in the Eredivisie. As a result, Fortuna Sittard were promoted directly to the Eredivisie, ending a sixteen-year absence from the Dutch top flight.

The promotion was subsequently commemorated with a special promotion trophy in the form of a silver ball, making the 2018 promotion a particularly unique chapter in Fortuna’s history.

=== 2018–present ===
Since returning to the Eredivisie in 2018, Fortuna Sittard have remained a top-flight club. The return marked the end of the longest absence from the Eredivisie in the club’s history and established a new era following years of financial uncertainty.

In 2021, Principion Holding became involved with the club as part of a new phase of development. Fortuna also expanded its activities with the introduction of Fortuna Vrouwen, which competes in the Eredivisie Vrouwen.

By 2026, Fortuna Sittard’s history therefore spans more than seven decades, from the pioneering establishment of professional football in Geleen in 1954 to its position as an established Eredivisie club. The club’s history is characterised by the pioneering Fortuna ’54 era, two KNVB Beker victories, European competition, the merger with Sittardia, periods of promotion and relegation, financial struggles, and the eventual return to the Eredivisie in 2018.

Fortuna. Proud founders of Dutch professional football

== Honours ==
Although Fortuna Sittard does not have as many major honours as the traditional Dutch top clubs such as AFC Ajax, Feyenoord, PSV Eindhoven, AZ Alkmaar and FC Twente, the club has a notable honours history, particularly when compared with most other Dutch clubs. As founders of Dutch professional football, Fortuna and its predecessors have won several national honours. Fortuna won the KNVB Cup in 1957 and 1964 when it called Fortuna ‘54, predecesor of Fortuna Sittard. The club won the division title of the Eerste Divisie in 1995.

The club also has a unique place in the history of Dutch promotion. In 2018, Fortuna Sittard finished second in the Eerste Divisie. At the time, finishing second did not normally guarantee direct promotion, but this changed because champions Jong Ajax were ineligible for promotion. As a reserve team, Jong Ajax were not allowed to play in the Eredivisie, meaning that Fortuna Sittard, as the runners-up, were promoted directly. The KNVB presented Fortuna with a promotion trophy, represented by a silver ball, making the 2018 promotion particularly distinctive in the club’s history.

Competition	Number	Years
KNVB Beker	2×	1957, 1964
Eerste divisie	1×	1995
Promotion trophy	1×	2018

- Promotion to the Eredivisie: 1982 & 2018
- Runner-up KNVB Beker: 1984 & 1999

== International ==
=== Totals ===
Competition	Participations	Games	Won	Draw	Lost	Goals scored	Goals conceded
UEFA Cup Winners' Cup	1	6	2	1	3	6	7
UEFA Intertoto Cup	1	4	2	1	1	8	6
Total	2	10	4	2	4	14	13

== Results ==
Below is a table with Fortuna Sittard's domestic results since the introduction of professional football in 1956.

Domestic Results since 1956
Domestic league	League result	Qualification to	KNVB Cup season	Cup result
2023–24 Eredivisie	10th	–	2023–24	quarter-final
2022–23 Eredivisie	13th	–	2022–23	first round
2021–22 Eredivisie	15th	–	2021–22	second round
2020–21 Eredivisie	11th	–	2020–21	round of 16
2019–20 Eredivisie	16th	No relegation due to COVID-19	2019–20	round of 16
2018–19 Eredivisie	15th	–	2018–19	quarter-final
2017–18 Eerste Divisie	2nd	Eredivisie (promotion)	2017–18	round of 16
2016–17 Eerste Divisie	17th	–	2016–17	first round
2015–16 Eerste Divisie	16th	–	2015–16	second round
2014–15 Eerste Divisie	19th	–	2014–15	third round
2013–14 Eerste Divisie	8th	promotion/relegation play-offs: no promotion	2013–14	second round
2012–13 Eerste Divisie	7th	promotion/relegation play-offs: no promotion	2012–13	second round
2011–12 Eerste Divisie	11th	–	2011–12	second round
2010–11 Eerste Divisie	16th	–	2010–11	third round
2009–10 Eerste Divisie	17th	–	2009–10	second round
2008–09 Eerste Divisie	15th	–	2008–09	third round
2007–08 Eerste Divisie	16th	–	2007–08	third round
2006–07 Eerste Divisie	15th	–	2006–07	second round
2005–06 Eerste Divisie	20th	–	2005–06	second round
2004–05 Eerste Divisie	19th	–	2004–05	second round
2003–04 Eerste Divisie	19th	–	2003–04	second round
2002–03 Eerste Divisie	15th	–	2002–03	group stage
2001–02 Eredivisie	18th	Eerste Divisie (relegation)	2001–02	round of 16
2000–01 Eredivisie	16th	– (surviving prom./releg. play-offs)	2000–01	round of 16
1999–2000 Eredivisie	12th	–	1999–2000	third round
1998–99 Eredivisie	10th	–	1998–99	final
1997–98 Eredivisie	7th	Intertoto Cup (R3)	1997–98	quarter-final
1996–97 Eredivisie	11th	–	1996–97	second round
1995–96 Eredivisie	13th	–	1995–96	round of 16
1994–95 Eerste Divisie	1st	Eredivisie (promotion)	1994–95	group stage
1993–94 Eerste Divisie	10th	–	1993–94	third round
1992–93 Eredivisie	16th	Eerste Divisie (losing prom./releg. play-off)	1992–93	round of 16
1991–92 Eredivisie	14th	–	1991–92	second round
1990–91 Eredivisie	12th	–	1990–91	second round
1989–90 Eredivisie	7th	–	1989–90	quarter-final
1988–89 Eredivisie	8th	–	1988–89	round of 16
1987–88 Eredivisie	8th	–	1987–88	round of 16
1986–87 Eredivisie	9th	–	1986–87	quarter-final
1985–86 Eredivisie	8th	–	1985–86	quarter-final
1984–85 Eredivisie	7th	–	1984–85	round of 16
1983–84 Eredivisie	12th	Cup Winners' Cup	1983–84	final
1982–83 Eredivisie	8th	–	1982–83	second round
1981–82 Eerste Divisie	2nd	Eredivisie (promotion)	1981–82	first round
1980–81 Eerste Divisie	4th	–	1980–81	second round
1979–80 Eerste Divisie	7th	–	1979–80	second round
1978–79 Eerste Divisie	4th	promotion competition: no promotion	1978–79	quarter-final
1977–78 Eerste Divisie	5th	–	1977–78	second round
1976–77 Eerste Divisie	7th	–	1976–77	second round
1975–76 Eerste Divisie	7th	promotion competition: no promotion	1975–76	first round
1974–75 Eerste Divisie	9th	–	1974–75	second round
1973–74 Eerste Divisie	5th	promotion competition: no promotion	1973–74	second round
1972–73 Eerste Divisie	9th	–	1972–73	first round
1971–72 Eerste Divisie	13th	–	1971–72	quarter-final
1970–71 Eerste Divisie	10th	–	1970–71	semi-final
1969–70 Eerste Divisie	14th	–	1969–70	first round
1968–69 Eredivisie	18th	Eerste Divisie (relegation)	1968–69	first round
1967–68 Eredivisie (as Fortuna '54......and Sittardia)	17th 18th	Merger into Fortuna SC	1967–68	group stage round of 16
1966–67 Eredivisie (as Fortuna '54......and Sittardia)	14th 7th	–	1966–67	first round
1965–66 Eredivisie (as Fortuna '54); 1965–66 Eerste Divisie (as Sittardia)	9th 1st	– Eredivisie (promotion)	1965–66	group stage
1964–65 Eredivisie (as Fortuna '54......and Sittardia)	6th 15th	– Eerste Divisie (relegation)	1964–65	first round round of 16
1963–64 Eredivisie (as Fortuna '54); 1963–64 Eerste Divisie (as Sittardia)	7th 1st	Cup Winners' Cup; Eredivisie (promotion)	1963–64	winner first round
1962–63 Eredivisie (as Fortuna '54); 1962–63 Eerste Divisie (as Sittardia)	12th	–	1962–63	round of 16 third round
1961–62 Eredivisie (as Fortuna '54); 1961–62 Eerste Divisie (as Sittardia)	12th 3rd	–	1961–62	?
1960–61 Eredivisie (as Fortuna '54); 1960–61 Eerste Divisie (as Sittardia)	15th 5th (group B)	–	1960–61	?
1959–60 Eredivisie (as Fortuna '54......and Sittardia)	14th 18th	– Eerste Divisie (relegation)	not held	not held
1958–59 Eredivisie (as Fortuna '54); 1958–59 Eerste Divisie (as Sittardia)	3rd 1st (group B)	– Eredivisie (promotion)	1958–59	?
1957–58 Eredivisie (as Fortuna '54); 1957–58 Eerste Divisie (as Sittardia)	4th 4th (group B)	–	1957–58	?
1956–57 Eredivisie (as Fortuna '54); 1956–57 Eerste Divisie (as Sittardia)	2nd 6th (group B)	–	1956–57	winner ?

== Players ==
=== Current squad ===
As of 9 October 2026

Note: Flags indicate national team as defined under FIFA eligibility rules; some limited exceptions apply. Players may hold more than one non-FIFA nationality.

No.	Pos.	Nation	Player
1	GK	NED	Luuk Koopmans
2	DF	BEL	Siebe Wylin
3	DF	BRA	Rodrigo Guth (on loan from Talleres)
5	MF	MAR	Yassin Oukili
6	DF	NED	Syb van Ottele
7	FW	SWE	Kristoffer Peterson
8	MF	NED	Jasper Dahlhaus
9	FW	BEL	Anthony Descotte (on loan from Charleroi)
10	FW	IDN	Ole Romeny (on loan from Oxford United)
12	DF	POR	Ivo Pinto (captain)
14	MF	NED	Sven Simons
15	DF	NED	Nick de Groot
20	MF	FRA	Édouard Michut

No.	Pos.	Nation	Player
22	FW	SUR	Shiloh 't Zand (on loan from Feyenoord)
23	MF	NED	Philip Brittijn
24	DF	NED	Daley Sinkgraven
25	FW	NED	Lequincio Zeefuik (on loan from AZ Alkmaar)
28	DF	IDN	Justin Hubner
31	GK	NED	Mattijs Branderhorst
33	GK	GER	Kaylen Reitmaier
35	DF	NED	Kevin van Burgsteden
38	MF	BEL	Moussa Gbemou
39	MF	BEL	Gani Büyükhan
44	DF	ESP	Iván Márquez
52	MF	MAR	Mohamed Ihattaren

== Former players ==
=== National team players ===
The following players were called up to represent their national teams in international football and received caps during their tenure with Fortuna Sittard: (Note: The following is a consolidated list of clubs' RKSV Sittardia, Fortuna '54 and Fortuna Sittard, as a result of the merger of the two prior aforementioned clubs in 1968.)

- Cape Verde
  - (Cape Verde) Deroy Duarte (2021–2024)
  - (Cape Verde) Lisandro Semedo (2017–2022)
  DR Congo
  - (Democratic Republic of the Congo) Samuel Moutoussamy (2020–2021)
  Finland
  - (Finland) Rasmus Karjalainen (2019–2021)
  Greece
  - (Greece) Lazaros Rota (2020–2021)
  Indonesia
  - (Indonesia) Ragnar Oratmangoen (2023–2024)
  - (Indonesia) **Justin Hubner (2025–present)**
  Kosovo
  - (Kosovo) Arianit Ferati (2021–2024)
  Luxembourg
  - (Luxembourg) Antoine Kohn (1959–1963; 1964–1965)
- Moldova
  - (Moldova) Vitalie Damașcan (2019–2020)
  - (Moldova) Alexei Koșelev (2018–2021)
  Netherlands
  - (Netherlands) Henk Angenent (1954–1962)
  - (Netherlands) Bram Appel (1948–1949; 1955–1960)
  - (Netherlands) Bart Carlier (1955–1958; 1964–1965)
  - (Netherlands) Willy Dullens (1963–1969)
  - (Netherlands) Gerard Gruisen (1951–1969)
  - (Netherlands) Cor van der Hart (1954–1966)
  - (Netherlands) Wim Koevermans (1980–1988)
  - (Netherlands) Frans de Munck (1954–1957)
  - (Netherlands) Jan Notermans (1955–1965)
  - (Netherlands) Willy Quaedackers (1961–1966)
  - (Netherlands) Wilbert Suvrijn (1981–1986)
  - (Netherlands) Faas Wilkes (1959–1962)
  New Zealand
  - (New Zealand) Fred de Jong (1990–1993)
- North Macedonia
  - (North Macedonia) Stefan Ashkovski (2016–2018)
  Northern Ireland
  - (Northern Ireland) Phil Gray (1996–1997)
  Slovakia
  - (Slovakia) Branislav Niňaj (2018–2021)
  Suriname
  - (Suriname) Justin Lonwijk (2024)
  - (Suriname) Gavin Vlijter (2015–2019)
  Sweden
  - (Sweden) Tesfaldet Tekie (2019–2022)
  Togo
  - (Togo) Sadik Fofana (2023–2024)

- Players in bold actively play for Fortuna Sittard and for their respective national teams. Years in brackets indicate careerspan with Fortuna Sittard.

=== National team players by Confederation ===
Member associations are listed in order of most to least amount of current and former Fortuna Sittard players represented Internationally

Total national team players by confederation
Confederation	Total	(Nation) Association
AFC	2	Indonesia (2)
CAF	4	Cape Verde (2), (Democratic Republic of the Congo) DR Congo (1), Togo (1)
CONCACAF	2	Suriname (2)
CONMEBOL	0	
OFC	1	New Zealand (1)
UEFA	21	Netherlands (12), Moldova (2), Finland (1), Greece (1), Luxembourg (1), North Macedonia (1), Northern Ireland (1), Slovakia (1), Sweden (1)

== Players in international tournaments ==
The following is a list of Fortuna Sittard players who have competed in international tournaments, including the Africa Cup of Nations. To this date no Fortuna Sittard players have participated in the FIFA World Cup, UEFA European Championship, CONCACAF Gold Cup, AFC Asian Cup, Copa América or the OFC Nations Cup while playing for Fortuna Sittard.

Cup	Players
(Cameroon) 2021 Africa Cup of Nations	(Cape Verde) Lisandro Semedo
(Ivory Coast) 2023 Africa Cup of Nations	(Cape Verde) Deroy Duarte

== Club staff ==
Position	Staff
Head coach	(Netherlands) Danny Buijs
Assistant Head Coach	(Netherlands) Adrie Poldervaart (Netherlands) Wil Boessen (Belgium) Patrick Creemers
Striker's Coach	(Netherlands) Toon Oijstra
Physiotherapist	(Netherlands) Jeroen Dieteren (Netherlands) Martijn Smeets
Team Manager	(Netherlands) Danny van der Weerden
Club doctor	(Netherlands) Robert van Gool
Materialman	(Netherlands) Ronald Ronken
Video Analyst	(Netherlands) Tjerk van Eggelen

== Coaches ==
As Fortuna '54

- 1956–57: (Austria) Friedrich Donenfeld (vice champion, cup winner)
- 1957–58: (Netherlands) Bram Appel
- 1958–59: (Netherlands) Harry Verhardt
- 1959–61: (Austria) Friedrich Donenfeld
- 1961–63: (Netherlands) Jung Schlangen
- 1963–65: (Netherlands) Wim Latten (cup winner 1964)
- 1965–66: (Germany) Max Schirschin
- 1966–67: (Germany) Karl-Heinz Marotzke
- 1967–68: (Netherlands) Bram Appel

As Sittardia

- (Netherlands) Frans Debruyn
- (Socialist Federal Republic of Yugoslavia) Vladimir Beara (1966–1968)
- (Netherlands) Frans Debruyn (1968)

As Fortuna Sittard

- (Netherlands) Frans Debruyn (1968–69)
- (Netherlands) Henk Reuvers (1969–70)
- (Netherlands) Evert Teunissen (1970–72)
- (Netherlands) Cor Brom (1972–76)
- (Netherlands) Cor van der Hart (1976–77)
- (Netherlands) Joop Castenmiller (1977–80)
- (Netherlands) Frans Körver (1980–84)
- (Netherlands) Bert Jacobs (1984–87)
- (Netherlands) Hans van Doorneveld (1987–89)
- (Netherlands) Han Berger (1989–91)
- (Germany) Georg Keßler (1991–92)
- (Netherlands) Chris Dekker (1992–94)
- (Netherlands) Pim Verbeek (1994–97)
- (Netherlands) Bert van Marwijk (1997–00)
- (Netherlands) Henk Duut (2000–01)
- (Netherlands) Frans Thijssen (2000–01)
- (Netherlands) Hans Verèl (2001)
- (Netherlands) Hans de Koning (2001–04)
- (Netherlands) Chris Dekker (2004–06)
- (Netherlands) Frans Körver (2006–07)
- (Netherlands) Henk Wisman (2007)
- (Netherlands) Roger Reijners (2007–10)
- (Netherlands) Wim Dusseldorp (2010–11)
- (Netherlands) Tini Ruys (2011–12)
- (Netherlands) Willy Boessen (2012–14)
- (Netherlands) Peter van Vossen (2014–15)
- (Netherlands) Ben van Dael (2015–16)
- (Nigeria) Sunday Oliseh (2017–18)
- (Portugal) Claudio Braga (a.i.) (2018)
- (Netherlands) René Eijer (2018–19)
- (Netherlands) Sjors Ultee (2019–20)
- (Netherlands) Kevin Hofland (2020)
- (Netherlands) Sjors Ultee (2020–2022)
- (Spain) Julio Velazquez (2022–2023)
- (Netherlands) Danny Buijs (2023–present)

== Women's football ==
In January 2022, Fortuna announced it was beginning a women's football department. The club started playing in the women's Eredivisie in the 2022–23 season. In its first season, the club finished third out of 11 teams. In the 2023–24 season, Fortuna finished in fourth place out of 12 teams, and forward Tessa Wullaert was the top goal scorer and Player of the Year. However, prior to the 2024–25 season, the club announced it had not generated sufficient revenue from the women's team and cut its player spending, with Wullaert, Alieke Tuin, and other players departing for new clubs.

== See also ==
- Dutch football league teams
