= Gerard Gruisen =

Dutch footballer

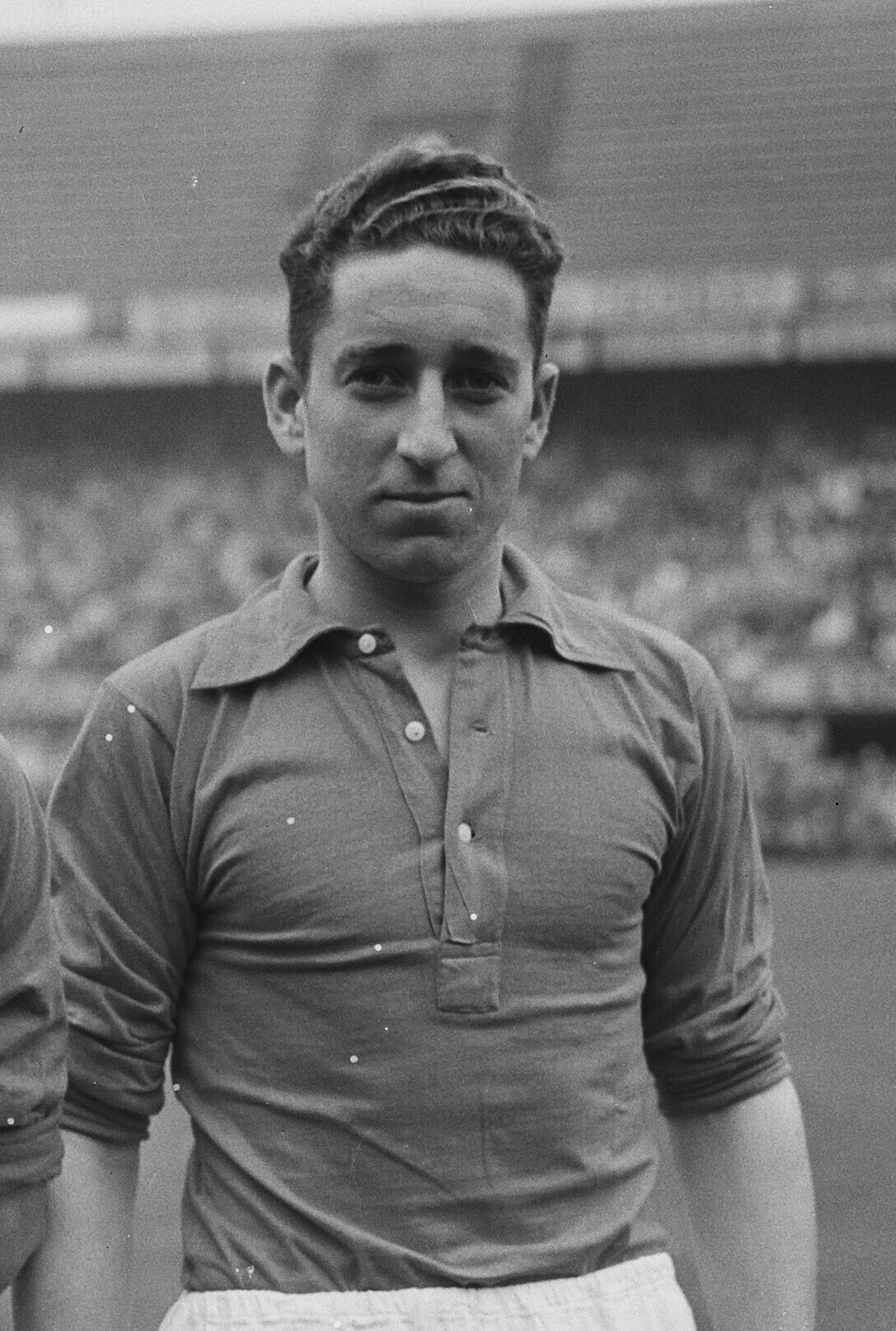
- Gruisen in 1953

Personal information
- Full name: Leonardus Gerardus Gruisen
- Date of birth: 4 February 1935 (age 91)
- Place of birth: Sittard, Netherlands
- Position: Striker

Youth career
- 1951–1956: Sittardia

Senior career*
Years	Team	Apps	(Gls)
1956–1968	Sittardia	308	(83)
1990–1997	Fortuna Sittard	2	(0)

International career
1953–1954	Netherlands	3	(0)
- * Club domestic league appearances and goals

Gerard Gruisen (born 4 February 1935) is a Dutch retired footballer. He played in three matches for the Netherlands national football team from 1953 to 1954.

Nicknamed Gruuske, Gruisen played his entire career for Sittardia and stood uit when playing alongside inside left Willy Erkens. He is one of the few players who suffered relegation from the Eredivisie a record four times.
