= Işıtan Gün =

Turkish businessman (born 1975)

Özgür Işıtan Gün
- Born: 7 December 1975 (age 50); Ankara, Turkey
- Education: Boğaziçi University
- Occupation: Businessman
- Years active: 2000–present

Özgür Işıtan Gün (born 7 December 1975) is a Turkish businessman who is owner of 20% shares of Fortuna Sittard. He is also the current chairman of the club.

== Career ==
In 2016, Gün became owner of Dutch side Fortuna Sittard.
